= List of stamp clubs and philatelic societies in the United States =

Stamp collecting began to emerge from obscurity in America after the Civil War, and by the 1880s philatelic societies were being formed to connect collectors, and to legitimize and publicize the hobby. The American Philatelic Association was formed in 1886. Other national, regional, and local clubs followed during the late nineteenth and into the twentieth centuries. Most of these societies were dominated by white men of financial means, and some actively excluded women and persons of color, though newer and more local clubs formed in the early twentieth century were often more welcoming.

By the middle of the twentieth century, hundreds of stamp clubs had formed throughout the United States, often affiliated with large organizations, such as the American Philatelic Society or the American Topical Association. Many published their own scholarly articles or journals, while others advertised in the journals of larger philatelic associations. Although participation in the hobby had declined by the early twenty-first century, many state and local stamp clubs continue to exist and meet on a regular basis.

== General ==
- American Air Mail Society
- American Helvetia Philatelic Society
- American Philatelic Society
- American Revenue Association
- American Topical Association
- Arabian Philatelic Association
- China Stamp Society
- Christmas Seal & Charity Stamp Society
- Cinderella Stamp Club
- Germany Philatelic Society
- International Society of Worldwide Stamp Collectors
- Polonus Philatelic Society
- Scandinavian Collectors Club
- Society for Czechoslovak Philately
- Society of Philatelic Americans
- Southern New England Federation of Stamp Clubs
- United Postal Stationery Society
- U.S. Philatelic Classics Society

== States ==
=== Alabama ===
- Birmingham Philatelic Society
- Eastern Shore Stamp Collectors (Fairhope)
- Huntsville Philatelic Club
- Calhoun County Stamp Club (Jacksonville)
- Stamp Club of Mobile
- Montgomery Area Stamp Club
- Tuscaloosa Stamp Club

=== Alaska ===
- Anchorage Philatelic Society
- Gastineau Philatelic Society (Juneau)

=== Arizona ===
- Arizona Federation of Stamp Clubs (Casa Grande)
- Arizona Philatelic Rangers (Tucson)
- Arizona Precancel Club (Scottsdale)
- Flagstaff Stamp Club
- Fountain Hills Stamp Club
- Mesa Stamp Club
- Phoenix Philatelic Association/Phoenix Stamp Club
- Prescott Stamp Club
- Roadrunner Stamp Club (Sierra Vista)
- Sun City Stamp Club
- Sun City West Coin & Stamp Club
- Sun Lakes Stamp Club
- Tucson Stamp Club
- Verde Valley Stamp Club (Sedona)
- Yuma Stamp Club (Yuma)

=== Arkansas ===
- Mountain Home Area Stamp Club
- Pinnacle Stamp Club of Arkansas (Little Rock)

=== California ===
- Alameda Stamp Club
- Arcadia Stamp Club
- Arrowhead Stamp Club (San Bernardino)
- Bakersfield Stamp Club
- Beckman Philatelic Society (Fullerton)
- Brentwood Library Children's Stamp Club (Los Angeles)
- Bunker Hill Stamp Club (Los Angeles)
- Burbank Stamp Club
- Collectors Club of Hollywood (Los Angeles)
- Collectors Club of San Francisco
- Conejo Valley Philatelic Society (Newbury Park)
- Council of Northern California Philatelic Societies (Napa)
- Diablo Valley Stamp Club (Walnut Creek)
- Downey California Stamp Club
- East Bay Collectors Club (Kensington)
- East Bay Collectors Club (San Pablo)
- East County Stamp Club (El Cajon)
- Federated Philatelic Societies of Southern California (Long Beach)
- Foothill Stamp Club (Los Altos)
- Fremont Stamp Club
- Fresno Philatelic Society
- Glendale Stamp Club (Montrose)
- Gold Country Stamp Club (Grass Valley)
- Golden Gate Precancel Society (Clearlake)
- Golden Gate Stamp Club (San Francisco)
- Hughes El Segundo Empire Association Stamp Club (El Segundo)
- Hughes Stamp Club (Los Angeles)
- Humboldt Stamp Collectors Club (Eureka)
- J.P.L. Stamp Club (Pasadena)
- Long Beach Stamp Club
- McDonnell Douglas Philatelic Club (Huntington Beach)
- McDonnell Douglas Philatelic Club (Newport Beach)
- Mendocino Coast Stamp Club (Fort Bragg)
- Monterey County Stamp Club (Salinas)
- Monterey Peninsula Stamp Club (Carmel)
- Mountain Area Stamp Club (Oakhurst)
- Netherlands Philatelists of California (El Cerrito)
- Orange County Philatelic Society
- Orange Senior Citizens Stamp Club
- Pajaro Valley Stamp Club (Watsonville)
- Peninsula Stamp Club (Burlingame)
- Philatelic Society of Los Angeles
- Philatelic Society of San Leandro
- Philatelic "25" (San Diego)
- Powy Stamp Club
- Redlands Stamp Club
- Redwood Empire Collectors Club (Petaluma)
- Riverside Stamp Club
- Sacramento Philatelic Society
- Saddleback Stamp Club (Lake Forest)
- San Diego County Philatelic Council
- San Diego Stamp Club
- San Francisco Pacific Philatelic Society
- San Jacinto Stamp Club (Hemet)
- San Jose Stamp Club
- San Luis Obispo Philatelic Society
- San Pablo Pines Stamp Club
- Santa Barbara Stamp Club
- Santa Cruz County Stamp Club (Capitola)
- Santa Rosa Stamp Club
- Scandinavian Collectors Club (Alameda)
- Scandinavian Philatelic Library of Southern California (Los Angeles)
- Sequoia Stamp Club (Redwood City)
- Simi Valley Stamp & Coin Club
- Society of Israel Philatelists, Los Angeles Chapter
- Solano Stamp Club (Vacaville)
- Southern California Precancel Club (Hemet)
- Stamp Club of Calaveras County (Avery)
- Stockton Stamp Club
- Tamalpais Stamp Club (San Rafael)
- Torrance Stamp Club
- TRW Stamp Club (Redondo Beach)
- Tuolumne County Stamp Club (Sonora)
- Vallejo Stamp Club
- Ventura County Philatelic Society
- Virtual Stamp Club on Delphi (Poway)
- Visalia Philatelic Society
- West Valley Stamp Club (Van Nuys)
- Yucca Valley Stamp Club

=== Colorado ===
- Arapahoe Stamp Club (Littleton)
- Aurora Stamp Club
- Banana Belt Stamp Club (Buena Vista)
- Bear Valley Stamp Club (Denver)
- Boulder Stamp Club
- Centennial Stamp Club (La Junta)
- Cherrelyn Stamp Club (Englewood)
- Collectors Club of Denver
- Colorado Springs Stamp Club
- Delta-Montrose Stamp Club (Grand Junction)
- Denver Germany Stamp Club
- Denver Stamp Club
- Longmont Stampers
- North Suburban Stamp Club (Broomfield)
- Northern Colorado Philatelic Society (Fort Collins)
- Pueblo Stamp Club
- Rocky Mountain Philatelic Exhibition (Denver)
- Stamp Club of Grand Junction
- West Side Stamp Club (Lakewood)

=== Connecticut ===
- Branford Philatelic Society
- Brookfield Philatelic Society
- Cheshire Philatelic Society
- Clinton Stamp Club
- Connecticut Cover Club (New Haven)
- Connecticut Cover Club (Willimantic)
- Connecticut Philatelic Society
- Hardware City Stamp Club (New Britain)
- Manchester Philatelic Society
- Middletown-Portland Stamp Club
- New Haven Philatelic Society
- Norwalk Stamp Club
- Nutmeg Stamp Club (Stratford)
- Simsbury Stamp Club
- Stamp Collectors' Club of Hartford
- Thames Stamp Club (Waterford)
- United Stamp Societies (Waterbury)
- Waterbury Stamp Club
- Ye Olde King's Highway Stamp Club (Darien)

=== Delaware ===
- Brandywine Valley Stamp Club (Wilmington)
- Corbit-Calloway Philatelists (Odessa)
- Dover Stamp Club
- DuPont Stamp Club
- Milton, Sussex County Stamp Club
- Newark Senior Center Stamp Group
- Scandinavian Collectors Club (Wilmington)
- Sussex County Stamp Club
- Wilmington Stamp Club

=== District of Columbia ===
- Collectors Club of Washington, DC, now part of the Washington Stamp Collectors Club
- Palisades Stamp Club
- Philatelic Club, Library of Congress
- Washington Philatelic Society, now part of the Washington Stamp Collectors Club
- Washington Stamp Collectors Club

=== Florida ===
- Bay County Stamp Club (Panama City)
- Cape Coral Stamp Club
- Cap't Townsend Stamp Club
- Cascade Lakes Stamp Club
- Central Florida Stamp Club (Orlando)
- Century Village East Stamp & Coin Club (Deerfield Beach)
- Clearwater Stamp Club
- Cub Cubano De Coleccion (West Miami)
- Collier County Stamp Club (Naples)
- Cresthaven Stamp Club (Greenacres)
- Cuban Philatelic Society of America (Miami)
- Cuban Philatelic Society of America (West Miami)
- Florida Precancel Club (Goldenrod)
- Ft. Lauderdale/Oakland Park Stamp Club (Oakland Park)
- Gainesville Stamp Club
- Gasparilla Stamp Club (Englewood)
- General Francis Marion Stamp Club (Ocala)
- George W. Linn Stamp Club (Howey-in-the-Hills)
- Germany Philatelic Society (Lakeland)
- Golden Triangle Stamp Club (Mount Dora)
- Halifax Area Philatelic Society (Holly Hill)
- Hollywood Stamp Club
- Indian River Stamp Club (Vero Beach)
- Jacksonville Stamp Collectors Club
- Keystone Heights Stamp Club
- Miami Beach Philatelic Society
- Mid-Florida Philatelic Society (Orlando)
- Missile Stamp Club (Palm Bay)
- New Port Richey Area Stamp Club
- Palm Beach/Delray Stamp Club (Delray Beach)
- Pensacola Philatelic Society
- Plant City Stamp Club
- Port Charlotte Stamp Club
- Port St. Lucie Stamp Club
- Ridge Stamp Club of Lakeland
- Sarasota Philatelic Club
- Sarasota Philatelic Society
- South Miami Stamp Club
- St. Augustine Stamp Club
- St. Petersburg Stamp Club
- Sunrise Stamp Club
- Tallahassee Stamp & Cover Club
- Tampa Collectors Club
- Tampa Stamp Club
- Titusville-Moonport Stamp Club
- Venice Stamp Club
- The Villages Philatelic Club (Lady Lake)
- West Florida Stamp Club
- West Volusia Stamp Club (DeLand)
- Winter Haven Stamp Club

=== Georgia ===
- Athens Philatelic Society
- Atlanta Stamp Collectors Club
- Button Gwinnett Stamp Club (Lilburn)
- Cobb County Stamp Club (Marietta)
- Columbus Area Stamp Club
- DeKalb Stamp Club (Decatur)
- Georgia Federation of Stamp Clubs
- Greater Augusta Stamp Club
- Heart of Georgia Philatelic Society (Warner Robins)
- North Atlanta Stamp Club (Roswell)
- Stone Mountain Philatelic Society (Atlanta)
- Sweetwater Stamp Society (Lithia Springs)
- Valdosta Stamp Club

=== Guam ===
- Guam Stamp Club (Agana Heights)

=== Hawaii ===
- Hawaii Postcard Club
- Hawaiian Philatelic Society

=== Idaho ===
- Eagle Stamp and Postcard Club
- Pocatello Stamp Club
- Snake River Stamp Club (Idaho Falls)
- South Central Idaho Stamp Club (Twin Falls, Idaho)

=== Illinois ===
- American Topical Association, Chicagoland Chapter
- Austin Philatelic Club (Chicago)
- Belleville Stamp Club, now the Belleville/Scott AFB Stamp Club
- Beverly Hills Philadelic Society (Chicago)
- Beverly-Roosevelt Stamp Club (Chicago)
- Blackhawk Philatelic Society (Rockford)
- Bloomington Stamp Club
- Caterpillar Stamp Club (East Peoria)
- Champaign-Urbana Stamp Club (Champaign)
- Chicago Air Mail Society
- Chicago Philatelic Society
- Collectors Club of Chicago
- Corn Belt Philatelic Society (Normal)
- Chicago Philatelic Society
- Decatur Stamp and Coin Club
- Evanston-New Trier Philatelic Society
- Galesburg Philatelic Society
- Germany Philatelic Society (Chicago)
- Glen Ellyn Philatelic Club (Wheaton)
- Greater Mound City Stamp Club (Greater St. Louis, MO)
- Illinois Federation of Stamp Clubs (Bloomington)
- Janesville Stamp Club
- Kankakee Coin, Stamp, & Sports Card Club (Bradley)
- Lake County Philatelic Society (Gurnee)
- Naperville Area Stamp Club (Lisle)
- North Shore Philatelic Society (Chicago)
- North Suburban Stamp Club (Grayslake)
- Northwest Stamp Club (Mount Prospect)
- Park Forest Stamp Club
- Philatelic Club of Will County (Joliet)
- The Philaterians (Arlington Heights)
- Polonus Philatelic Society (Chicago)
- Quad-City Stamp Club (Moline)
- Rockford Stamp Club
- Scandinavian Collectors Club (Chicago)
- Scouts on Stamps Society (Chicago)
- Smith Center Stamp Club (Skokie)
- Southern Illinois Stamp Club (Carbondale)
- Spring Hill Stamp Club (West Dundee)
- Springfield Philatelic Society
- Suburban Collectors Club (Brookfield)
- Tri-County Stamp Club (Peoria)

=== Indiana ===
- Anthony Wayne Stamp Society (Fort Wayne)
- Bloomington Stamp Club
- Calumet Stamp Club (Hammond)
- Centerville Stamp Club (Richmond)
- Evansville Stamp Club
- Indiana Stamp Club (Indianapolis)
- Johnson County Stamp Club (Franklin)
- Kokomo Stamp Club (Carmel)
- Lafayette Stamp Club, Lafayette Indiana, meets at the West Lafayette Public Library, 208 W. Columbia St., West Lafayette, FIRST THURSDAY 6 PM each month.
- Madison County Bicentennial Stamp Club (Anderson)
- Northern Indiana Philatelic Society (South Bend)
- Pioneer Philatelic Phalanx of Kentucky and Indiana
- Wabash Valley Stamp Club (Terre Haute)

=== Iowa ===
- Allison Stamp Club
- Cedar Rapids Stamp Club
- Cedar Valley Stamp Club (Waterloo)
- Council Bluffs Stamp Club
- Des Moines Philatelic Society
- Dubuque Stamp Club
- Hawkeye Stamp Club (Burlington)
- Iowa City Stamp Club
- Iowa Women's Philatelic Society (Des Moines)
- Oneota Stamp Club (Decorah)
- Tri-State Stamp Club (Dubuque)

=== Kansas ===
- Cessna Stamp Club (Wichita)
- Collectors Club of Kansas City (Shawnee Mission)
- Flint Hills Stamp Club (Manhattan)
- Fort Hays Stamp Club (Hays)
- Midwest Philatelic Society aka Kansas City Stamp Club (Greater Kansas City)
- Kansas Precancel Society (Wichita)
- Lawrence Stamp Club
- Lindsborg Stamp Club
- Topeka Stamp Club
- Wichita Stamp Club

=== Kentucky ===
- Henry Clay Philatelic Society (Lexington)
- Kentucky Precancel Society (Lexington)
- Kentucky Stamp Club (Frankfort)
- Louisville Stamp Society
- Owensboro Area Stamp Club
- Pioneer Philatelic Phalanx of Kentucky and Indiana

=== Louisiana ===
- Acadiana Stamp Club (Lafayette)
- Baton Rouge Stamp Club
- Cenla Stamp Club (Alexandria)
- Crescent City Stamp Club (New Orleans)
- Red River Stamp Society (Shreveport)
- Twin City Stamp Club (Monroe)

=== Maine ===
- Belfast Stamp Club (Orono
- Maine Bangor Stamp Club (Bangor)
- Maine Philatelic Society (Cumberland Center)
- Portland Stamp Club (Scarborough)
- Union River Stamp Club (Ellsworth)
- Unitarian-Universalist Stamp Club (Kennebunkport)
- Waterville Stamp Club (Fairfield)
- York County Stamp Club (Sanford)

=== Maryland ===
- Annapolis Stamp Club
- Baltimore Philatelic Society
- Beltway Stamp Club (Adelphi)
- Bowie Stamp Club
- Carroll County Philatelic Association (New Windsor)
- Cecil County Stamp Club (North East)
- Chesapeake Philatelic Society (Baltimore)
- Eastern Shore Stamp Club (Salisbury)
- Frederick Stamp Club (Walkersville)
- Goddard Space Flight Center Stamp Club (Greenbelt)
- Hagerstown Stamp Club
- Harford County Stamp Club (Aberdeen)
- Howard County Stamp Club (Ellicott City)
- Germany Philatelic Society, Herman L. Halle Chapter (Baltimore)
- Leisure World Stamp Club (Silver Spring)
- Potomac Philatelic Society
- Rockville-Gaithersburg Stamp Club (Gaithersburg)
- Silver Hill Lions Club (Clinton)
- Silver Spring Philatelic Society
- Tidewater Stamp Club (Easton)
- Tri-State Stamp Club (Cumberland)

=== Massachusetts ===
- Austin Philatelic Club (Massachusetts)
- Berkshire Museum Stamp Club (Pittsfield)
- Berkshire Stamp Club
- Boston Philatelic Society
- Bristol County Philatelic Society
- Cape Cod Area Philatelic Group
- Chelmsford Stamp Club
- Clara Barton Stamp Club (Oxford)
- Fall River Philatelic Society
- Franklin Stamp Club (Greenfield)
- Golden Bee Stamp Club (Plympton)
- Granite City Stamp Club (Weymouth)
- Greater Boston Philatelic Society (Medford)
- Harwich Stamp Club (East Orlenna)
- Malden Stamp Club (Everett)
- Mohawk Stamp Club (Williamstown)
- Needham Stamp Club
- Newburyport Stamp Club
- Northeastern Federation of Stamp Clubs (Weston)
- Philatelic Club of Boston (North Reading)
- Pioneer Valley Stamp Club (Longmeadow)
- Samuel Osgood Stamp Club (North Andover)
- Scandinavian Collectors Club (West Newton)
- Stoughton Stamp Club
- Wachusett Philatelic Society (Leominster)
- Waltham Stamp Club (Weston)
- Webster-Dudley Stamp Club (Dudley)
- Westfield Stamp Club
- Whaling City Stamp Club (New Bedford)
- Worcester County Stamp Club (Worcester)

=== Michigan ===
- Ann Arbor Stamp Club
- Bay De Noc Stamp & Coin Club (Escanaba
- Birmingham Stamp Club
- Collectors Club of Michigan (Detroit)
- Dearborn Stamp Club
- Detroit Philatelic Society
- Essex County Stamp Club (Detroit)
- Ferndale Stamp Club
- Floral City Stamp Club (Monroe)
- Ford Stamp Club (Dearborn)
- Greater Grand Rapids Stamp Club (Wyoming)
- Greenville Stamp Club
- Kalamazoo Stamp Club
- Kent Philatelic Society (Grand Rapids)
- Lansing Area Stamp Club (East Lansing)
- Michigan Precancel Club (Wyandotte)
- Michigan Stamp Club (Detroit)
- Mid Michigan Stamp Club (Mount Pleasant)
- Motor City Stamp & Cover Club (Dearborn)
- Mount Clemens Stamp Club
- Muskegon Stamp Club
- Northwest Michigan Coin and Stamp Club (Petoskey)
- Northwoods Philatelic Society (Iron Mountain)
- Oakland County Stamp Club (Birmingham)
- Peninsular State Philatelic Society (Saginaw)
- Plate Number Coil Collectors Club (Troy)
- Pontiac Stamp Club
- Southwestern Michigan Stamp Club (St. Joseph
- Vehicle City Stamp Club (Flint)
- West Suburban Stamp Club (Plymouth)

=== Minnesota ===
- Maplewood Stamp Club
- Saint Cloud Area Stamp Club
- Trans-Mississippi Philatelic Society
- Twin City Philatelic Society

=== Mississippi ===
- Gulf Coast Stamp Club

=== Missouri ===
- Columbia Philatelic Society
- Greater Mound City Stamp Club (Greater St. Louis, MO)
- Hannibal Philatelic Society
- Kansas City Philatelic Society
- Kingdom Philatelic Association (Fulton, MO)
- Joplin Stamp Club
- Midwest Philatelic Society aka Kansas City Stamp Club (Greater Kansas City)
- St. Louis Bears Philatelic Exhibitors (Greater St Louis, MO)
- Webster Groves Stamp Club (Greater St. Louis, MO)

=== Montana ===
- Helena Stamp Club

=== Nebraska ===
- Buffalo Bill Stamp Club (North Platte)
- Omaha Philatelic Society

=== Nevada ===
- Las Vegas Stamp Club
- Reno Stamp Club

=== New Jersey ===
- Belleville Stamp Club
- Clifton Stamp Society
- Coryell's Ferry Stamp Club (Lambertville)
- Essex Stamp Club (Newark
- Gloucester City Stamp Club
- Pascack Stamp Club (Westwood)

=== New Hampshire ===
- Manchester Stamp Club

=== New Mexico ===
- Albuquerque Philatelic Society
- New Mexico Philatelic Association

=== New York ===
- American Topical Association (New York, New York)
- Buffalo Stamp Club
- Collectors Club of New York
- Danville Area Coin & Stamp Club
- Dutchess Philatelic Society
- Fort Orange Stamp Club (Albany)
- Inter-National Stamp Society (Islip)
- International Stamp Club (Brooklyn)
- Newburgh Stamp Club
- Plewacki Stamp Society (Depew)
- Rochester Philatelic Association

=== North Carolina ===
- Charlotte Philatelic Society
- Confederate Stamp Alliance

=== North Dakota ===
- Fargo Philatelic Society
- Grand Forks AFB Stamp Club
- North Dakota Philatelic Society

=== Ohio ===
- Black River Stamp Club (Elyria)
- Cleveland Stamp Club
- Collectors Club of Akron
- Columbus Philatelic Club
- Cuy-Lor Stamp Club (Westlake)
- Cuyahoga Falls Stamp Club
- Dayton Stamp Club
- Garfield-Perry Stamp Club (Cleveland)
- Greater Cincinnati Philatelic Society
- Mahoning Valley Stamp Club
- McKinley Stamp Club (North Canton)
- Springfield Stamp Society
- Stamp Collectors Club of Toledo
- Stark County Stamp Club
- Tuscora Stamp Club (New Philadelphia, Ohio)

=== Oklahoma ===
- Oklahoma City Stamp Club
- Oklahoma Philatelic Society (Tulsa)

=== Oregon ===
- Central Oregon Stamp Club
- Corvallis Stamp Club
- Portland Stamp Club
- Southern Oregon Philatelic Society

=== Pennsylvania ===
- Alle-Kiski Valley Numismatic/Philatelic Society (Lower Burrell)
- Allentown Philatelic Society
- Blue And Gray Stamp Club (Gettysburg)
- Butler County Philatelic Society
- Buxmont Stamp Club (Warminster)
- Capital City Philatelic Society (Harrisburg)
- Coryell's Ferry Stamp Club
- Cumberland Valley Philatelic Society (Fayetteville)
- Erie Stamp Club
- Greater Philadelphia Stamp and Collectors Club
- Johnstown Stamp Club
- Lancaster County Philatelic Society
- Mount Joy Stamp Club
- Pittsburgh Philatelic Society

=== Puerto Rico ===
- Puerto Rico Philatelic Society (San Juan)

=== Rhode Island ===
- Providence Philatelic Society

=== South Carolina ===
- Charleston Stamp Club
- Columbia Philatelic Society

=== South Dakota ===
- Germany Philatelic Society
- Ringneck Coin and Stamp Club
- Sioux Falls Stamp Club

=== Tennessee ===
- Brentwood Philatelic Society
- Chattanooga Stamp Club
- Holston Stamp Club (Johnson City)
- Knoxville Philatelic Society
- Knoxville Stamp Club
- Memphis Stamp Collectors Society
- Nashville Philatelic Society

=== Texas ===
- Austin Stamp Collectors Club
- Austin Texas Stamp Club
- Border Philatelic Society (El Paso)
- Bryan-College Station Stamp Club
- Dallas/Park Cities Philatelic Society
- Houston Philatelic Society
- Nacogdoches Stamp Club
- Panther City Philatelic Society (Fort Worth)
- Port Lavaca Philatelic Society
- San Antonio Philatelic Society
- Southwest Philatelic Foundation
- Texas A&M University Stamp Club (now the Bryan-College Station Stamp Club)

=== Vermont ===
- Brattleboro Stamp Club
- Chittenden County Stamp Club
- Green Mountain Stamp Society (Bennington)
- Rutland County Stamp Club
- Washington County Stamp Club

=== Virginia ===
- Allied Military Government Collectors' Club
- Ayr Hill Stamp Club
- Big Lick Stamp Club (Roanoke)
- Charlottesville Stamp Club
- Eastern Prince William Stamp Club
- Norfolk Philatelic Society
- Richmond Stamp Club
- Rockingham Stamp Club
- Virginia Philatelic Federation

=== Washington ===
- Bellingham Stamp Club
- Greater Eastside Stamp Society (Bellevue)
- Inland Empire Philatelic Society
- Olympia Philatelic Society
- Olympic Philatelic Society (Bremerton)
- Sno-King Stamp Club (Everett) and (Washington)
- Tri-City Stamp Club (Richland)
- Washington State Philatelic Society

=== West Virginia ===
- Blennerhassett Stamp Society (Parkersburg)
- Harrison County Stamp Club
- Kanawha Stamp Club (Charleston)
- Morgantown Area Stamp Club
- Mountain State Stamp Club

=== Wisconsin ===
- Badger Stamp Club (Madison)
- Baraboo Area Stamp Club
- Central Wisconsin Stamp Club
- Coulee Region Stamp Club
- Fond Du Lac Stamp Club
- Green Bay Philatelic Society
- Kenosha Stamp & Cover Club
- Milwaukee Philatelic Society
- Northwoods Stamp & Coin Club (Rhinelander)
- Outagamie Philatelic Society (Appleton)
- Walworth County Stamp Club
- Wauwatosa Philatelic Society
- Wisconsin Federation of Stamp Clubs
- Wisconsin Valley Philatelic Society

=== Wyoming ===
- Central Wyoming Philatelic Association (Casper)
- Cheyenne Philatelic Society
