= Coffee stamp =

Postage stamps on the theme of coffee

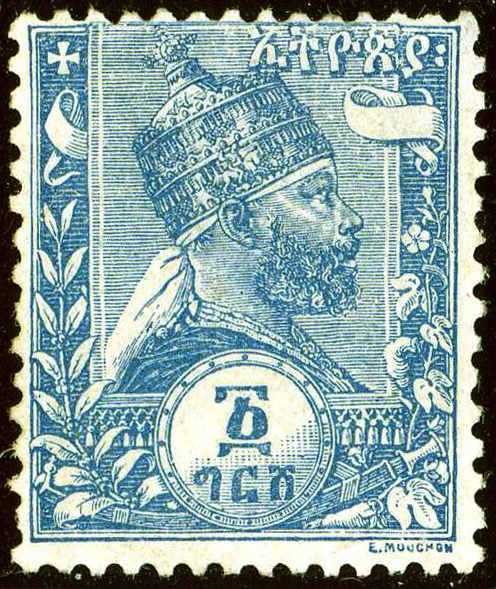
Probably the oldest coffee stamp in the world issued in Ethiopia (1894)

A coffee stamp is a postage stamp with designs related to coffee. The oldest is believed to have been issued in Ethiopia in 1894. It is estimated that more than 300 types have been issued so far. Many deal with the coffee tree as a plant. From harvesting, processing, and transportation operations to coffee cups and cafes, the objects and designs are diverse. Coffee stamps have become a subject of topical stamp collecting, where stamps are collected on a specific theme.

== History ==
The first appearance of coffee as a stamp design was on a stamp issued in Ethiopia around 1894. This is often regarded as the beginning of coffee stamps. Monochrome print with a portrait of Emperor Menelik II surrounded by branches of coffee trees. All early coffee stamps, including this one, were only depicted with coffee tree branches around the portrait or coat of arms.

Later, as stamps became an object of collecting, they became a medium for disseminating one's culture to the rest of the world. A series of coffee stamps were issued by coffee-producing countries to promote their coffee. In countries where coffee is a typical product, there are also examples of designs that symbolize the country's industry. Coffee is also featured as a familiar material on ordinary postage stamps, as it is an everyday commonplace in the producing countries. Finding a coffee-producing country, especially in Latin America, that does not issue coffee stamps is even more challenging.

Around 1980, a series of stamps on the country's food culture theme were issued in many countries worldwide. More coffee stamps are being issued in coffee-consuming countries. Also, as the issue of scented stamps increased in the 21st century, coffee stamps with a coffee flavor were also issued. Scented coffee stamps were issued in Brazil in 2001, New Caledonia in 2002 and Portugal in 2009.

Coffee stamps have been issued by dozens of countries as of 2011, and it is estimated that there are more than 300 types of stamps, including those with the same design but different denominations.

== Design ==
Many of the countries issuing coffee stamps are coffee-producing countries. Early coffee stamps, such as the Ethiopian stamp of 1894, believed to be the first coffee stamp, were often designed with a coffee tree branch around a portrait or coat of arms. Eventually, coffee stamps were issued to promote the country's coffee and advertise it worldwide as an export product. Coffee stamps of diverse designs were issued.

Many deal with the coffee tree as a plant. For example, buds and saplings, green leaves, white flowers and red fruits. Some deal with operations such as harvesting, sorting, and drying.

Some coffee stamps deal with the logistics of coffee beans by oxen, cars, and boats. Harvesting by beautiful women is one of the standard designs for coffee stamps. Many coffee stamps deal with people and commemorative events related to coffee.

Increasingly, coffee-consuming countries are also issuing stamps containing coffee-related designs. Many designs related to coffee poured into coffee cups and drinking.

== Countries of issue ==
=== Africa ===
Africa is a coffee-producing region and is second only to Latin America to issue coffee stamps.

==== Ethiopia ====
Ethiopia is considered the origin of the coffee tree. Although small in quantity, it is a source of good-quality coffee beans. Wild coffee trees also exist, and the coffee beans harvested from them are prized as Ethiopian or Abyssinian. Ethiopia was the first country to have coffee as a design on a postage stamp. Stamps depicting coffee trees with red-red berries have been issued. In 1982, a set of five stamps was issued depicting a coffee tree sapling, a coffee shipment, and even a traditional coffee-drinking ceremony.

==== Kenya ====
From 1935 to 1954, Kenya, Uganda, and Tanganyika issued stamps in common depicting coffee gardens with Mount Kilimanjaro in the distance.

In Kenya, a stamp was issued in 1963 depicting the harvest in a coffee garden, and coffee was also featured on a commemorative stamp for the 25th anniversary of independence in 1988.

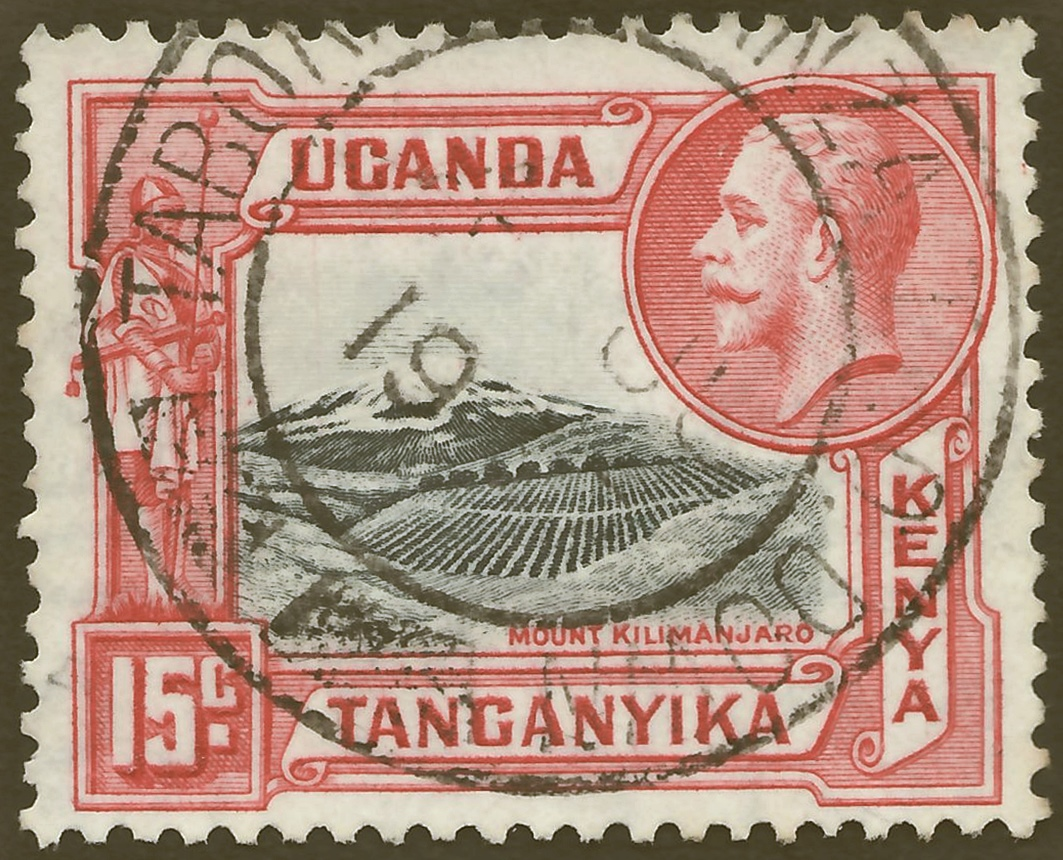
Stamps issued jointly by Kenya, Uganda and Tanganyika (1935 – )

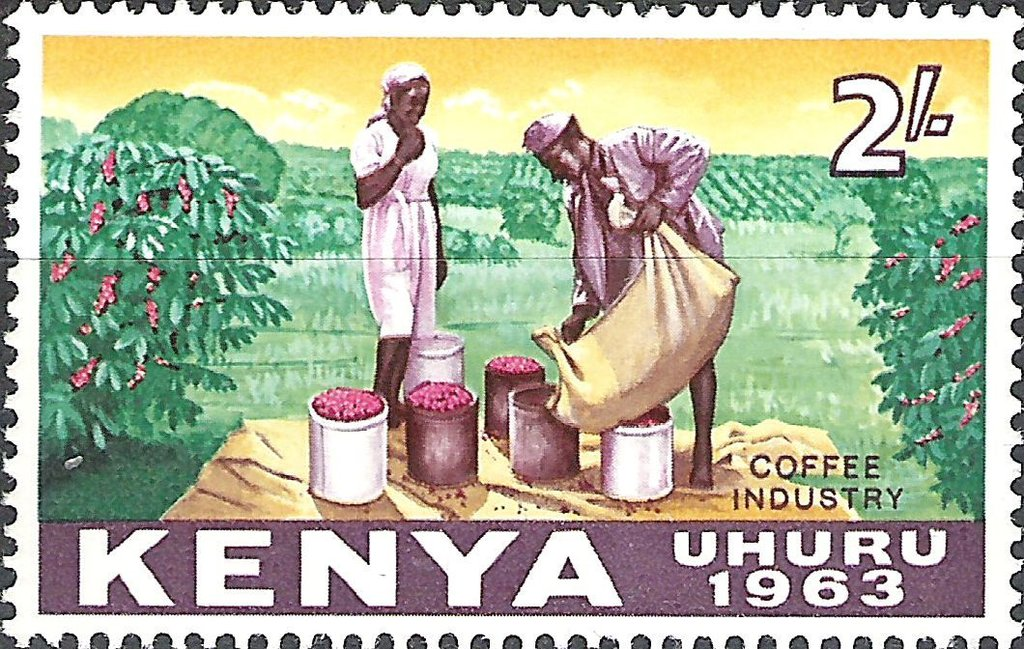
Stamps issued in Kenya depicting the coffee harvest (1963)

==== Rwanda ====
Coffee and banana are Rwanda's main exports, along with tea. Commemorative stamp issued in 1963 to commemorate independence in 1962, featuring a coffee tree flower, a branch with fruit and a coffee bean. One of the two mini-sheets published in 1975 to commemorate the 10th anniversary of agricultural modernization also depicts red ripe coffee berries and harvesting.

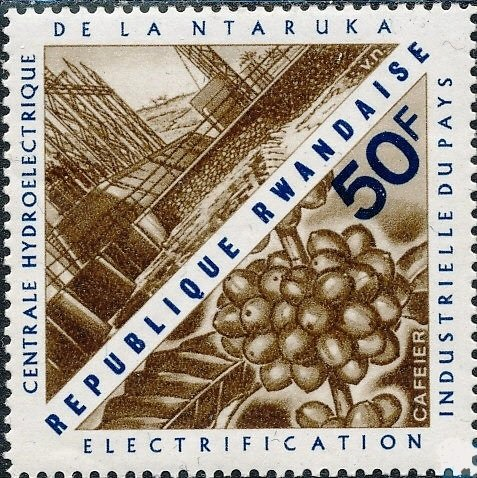
1967

==== Former French colonies in Africa ====
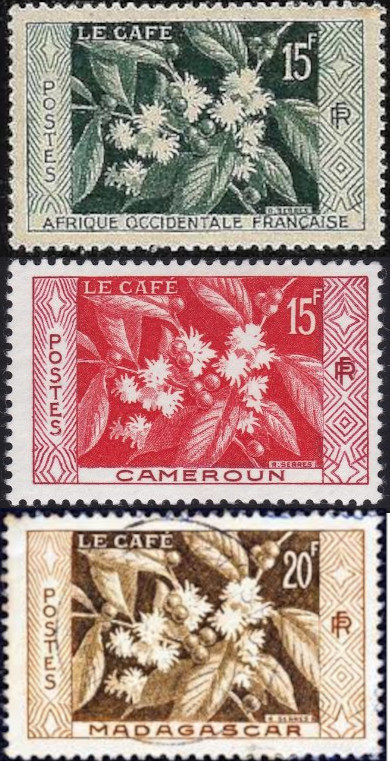
Stamps issued in 1956 in French territory Africa with the same design

Stamps issued with the same design in Equatorial Africa, West Africa and Madagascar, which were French territories, also feature a flowering coffee tree branch.

==== Cameroon ====
Coffee is also a major export in Cameroon, along with cocoa and bananas. Two sets of stamps were issued in 1954, one showing a man carrying a basket of harvested bananas on his head and the other showing a half-naked woman harvesting coffee.

Five stamps were issued in 1973 to promote agriculture and forestry, each featuring cotton, cocoa, wood, coffee and tea. The coffee stamps are beautifully colored with dark green leaves, pure white flowers and red-red fruits.

==== Ivory Coast ====
Ivory Coast is a major coffee producer, and coffee is depicted on seven stamps with the same design and different denominations issued between 1936 and 1944, and on a commemorative stamp issued in 1970 for the 10th anniversary of independence.

==== Other Africa ====
The French overseas department Réunion Island in the Indian Ocean produces very little coffee, but coffee tree branches, leaves and berries are designed on a stamp issued in 1947.

An unusual design is a stamp issued by the Republic of Congo in 1991, depicting coffee pests as an awareness campaign for pest control.

Mozambique, Uganda, Tanzania and Gabon are also known to issue coffee stamps.

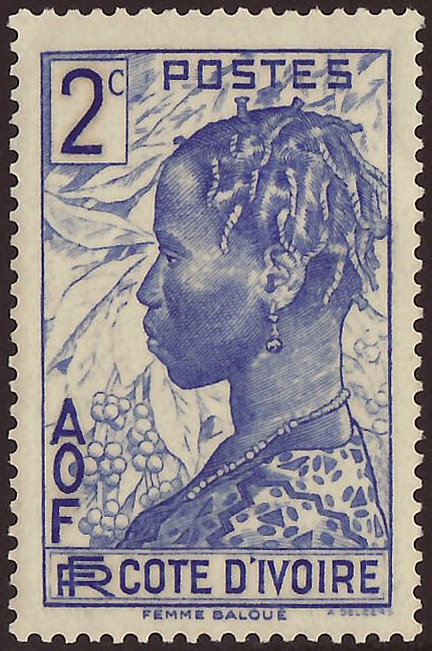
One of seven stamps issued in Ivory Coast with the same design (1936 – )

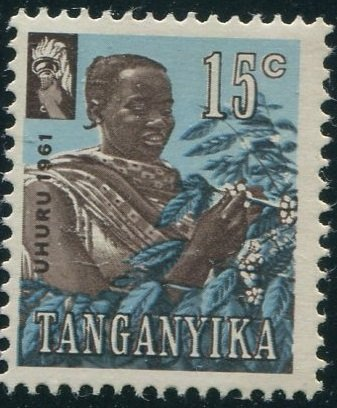
Tanganyika, 1961

=== Middle East ===
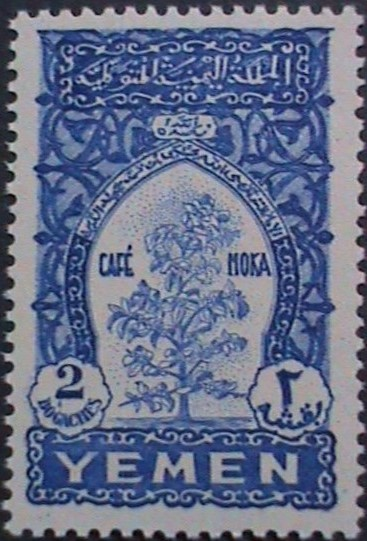
Definitive stamp issued in Yemen between 1947 and 1958

==== Yemen ====
Yemen, on the other side of the Red Sea from Ethiopia, produces a coffee bean called Arabian mocha, but the amount produced is negligible. However, the country has a strong relationship with coffee, with the port city of Mokha, which prospered as a collection point for African coffee beans from Ethiopia and other countries, and the national emblem has a coffee tree design. A regular stamp issued between 1947 and 1958 shows a flowering coffee tree within the gates of a mosque in a beautiful Arabesque pattern.

In December 1989, Yemen issued a 300 fils coffee plant stamp. The stamp commemorated the centenary of the establishment of the Inter-Parliamentary Union.

==== Other Middle East ====
Other coffee stamps have been issued in the Middle East in Jordan, Bahrain, the United Arab Emirates and Tunisia. A set of five stamps issued in Jordan in 2008 was designed with a set of Arabic-style tools from roasting to extraction.

=== Europe ===
==== Italy ====
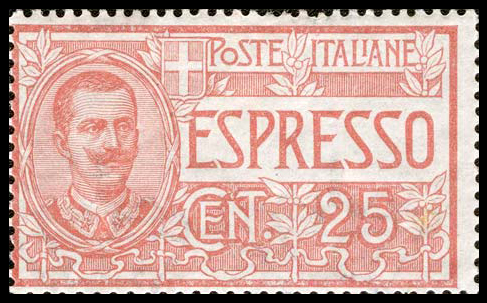
This is not a coffee stamp; ESPRESSO means express mail.

A stamp issued in Italy in 1903 has the word 'ESPRESSO' printed on it. However, this has nothing to do with coffee espresso and means express mail in Italian.

==== Poland ====
In 2009, Poland issued a stamp sheet with the theme 'Polish footprints in Europe', depicting Kulczycki and coffee beans.

==== Austria ====
In Austria, a postage stamp of a café by Wolfgang Herzig was issued in 1999, and in 2011, a stamp featuring the exterior of the long-established Café Hawelka, and its specialty coffee 'mélange' with frothy cream on top, respectively.

==== France ====
In France, a stamp depicting a café with a garçon was issued in 2006 as one of a series of ten stamp sheets on regional food culture.

==== Netherlands ====
Netherlands issued a commemorative stamp for the 250th anniversary of the coffee company in 2003 and a stamp depicting a coffee-drinking fairy in 2008.

==== Other Europe ====
Sweden issued a stamp in 2006 on the theme of 'coffee culture', Portugal issued a scented stamp in 2009 and Bosnia and Herzegovina is known for a stamp issued in 2009 depicting Bosnian-style coffee, and Bosnia and Herzegovina is known for a stamp issued in 2009 depicting Bosnian-style coffee.

=== North America ===
In 1979, a stamp with coffeepots as a folk Art design was sold in the US.

Also, one of a set of ten greeting stamps issued in the US in 1987 depicted coffee in a coffee cup. This, along with the glasses and the crossword puzzle, was designed to symbolize fatherhood.

=== Central America ===
Including the southern half of Mexico, where the Tropic of Cancer crosses the center of the country, Central America is in the coffee belt and is a suitable area for coffee cultivation. However, the emphasis on stamps varies from country to country, partly due to their national conditions.

==== Costa Rica ====
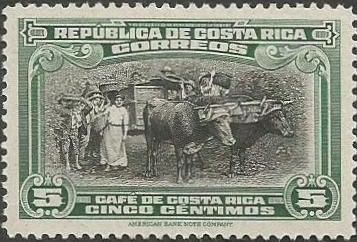
Transporting coffee in a two-horse ox cart. Costa Rica, 1945.

In Costa Rica, where coffee cultivation is said to have started by the end of the 18th century, the earliest of all Central American countries, a number of coffee stamps have been issued.

In 1921, a stamp printed with a coffee bag overlaid with the words 'CAFÉ DE COSTA RICA' on a regular 1 céntimos stamp was issued in 5 céntimo to commemorate the centenary of the introduction of coffee to Costa Rica, which was only valid for eight days before and after 29 June 1921.

A stamp issued in 1945 with precise intaglio printing depicting a two-bullock cart transporting coffee. In 1949, as part of the 75th anniversary of the founding of the Universal Postal Union, a commemorative stamp was issued depicting a branch of a coffee tree with fruit and a pigeon. One of the 14 commemorative stamps issued for the National Agricultural, Forestry and Fisheries Exposition in 1950 in five categories – cattle, tuna, pineapple, banana and coffee – shows a woman holding harvested coffee beans in a basket.

The country also issued a commemorative stamp during the 1970 World Exposition in Japan, one of a set of six stamps depicting a young woman smiling while harvesting red-red coffee berries against a background of dark green coffee trees.

==== El Salvador ====
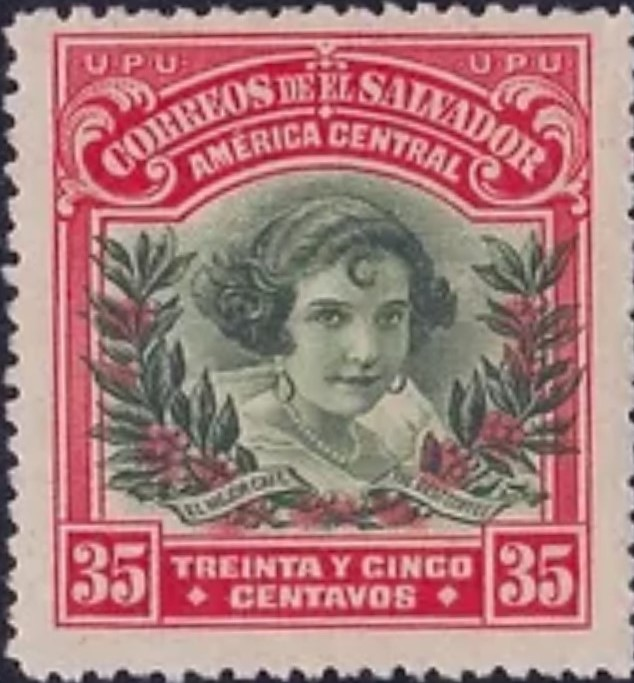
Beauty pageant winners and coffee tree leaves, 1924

El Salvador is also focusing on coffee production and export. El Salvador's coffee stamps include a 1924 beauty contest winner with coffee tree leaves around her, a 1935 issue with coffee in a gunny sack and a watercraft depicting the port, a 1940 issue with coffee tree flowers in full bloom and fruit in full bloom. two stamps of coffee trees, a set of nine commemorative stamps depicting nine women harvesting coffee[4] as part of the centenary of the Santa Ana Department in 1956 and a set of six stamps depicting the cultivation process as part of the 50th anniversary of the Coffee Association of El Salvador in 1979.

In addition to these, there is a triangular stamp with a design of a lady sitting on a chair with a coffee cup in her hand against a background of coffee trees. In Spanish and English it reads 'USE SALVADOR COFFEE IT IS THE BEST GROWN', but it is reportedly not found in the Scott catalogue, and the year and purpose of issue are unknown.

==== Mexico ====
Coffee beans from Mexico are known as Mexican coffee, but few coffee stamps have been issued in Mexico. A commemorative stamp of the Second Inter-American Council of Agriculture held in Mexico in 1942, with a design of a hand holding a fruiting coffee tree, was issued as a set of three stamps together with corn and bananas, and one of a series of stamps issued in 1988 for export products was known as the Mexican coffee stamps.

==== Guatemala ====
Guatemala and Nicaragua are the other two countries in Central America known to issue coffee stamps.

Guatemala issued a stamp in 1929 with the words 'GUATEMARLA PRODUCES THE BEST COFFEE IN THE WORLD'.

In Guatemala, one of five stamps issued in 1950 to promote export agricultural products, including bananas and sugarcane, depicted a woman harvesting coffee berries. In addition, a mini-sheet illustrating the coffee process from harvest to shipping was published in 2006. Furthermore, in Guatemala, a postmark from 1933 has been identified, although not a postage stamp, stating in four languages that 'Guatemala produces the best coffee in the world'.

=== West Indies ===
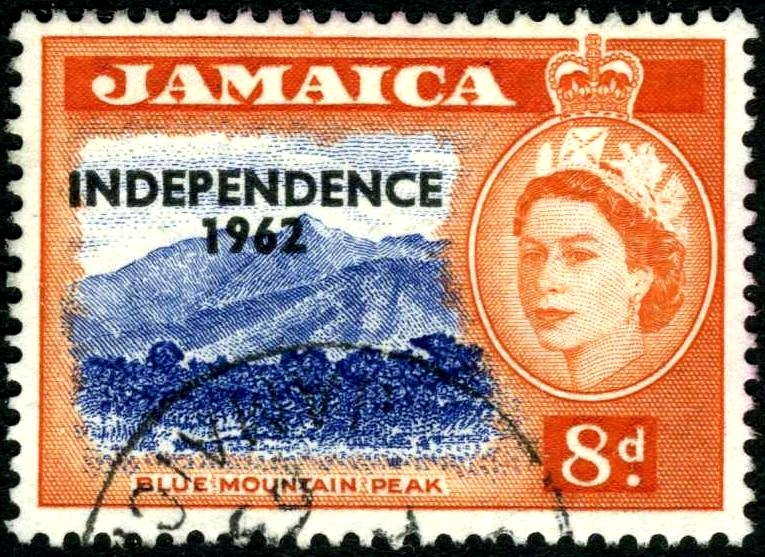
Stamps issued in Jamaica, then a British territory, depicting the Blue Mountains range (1956)

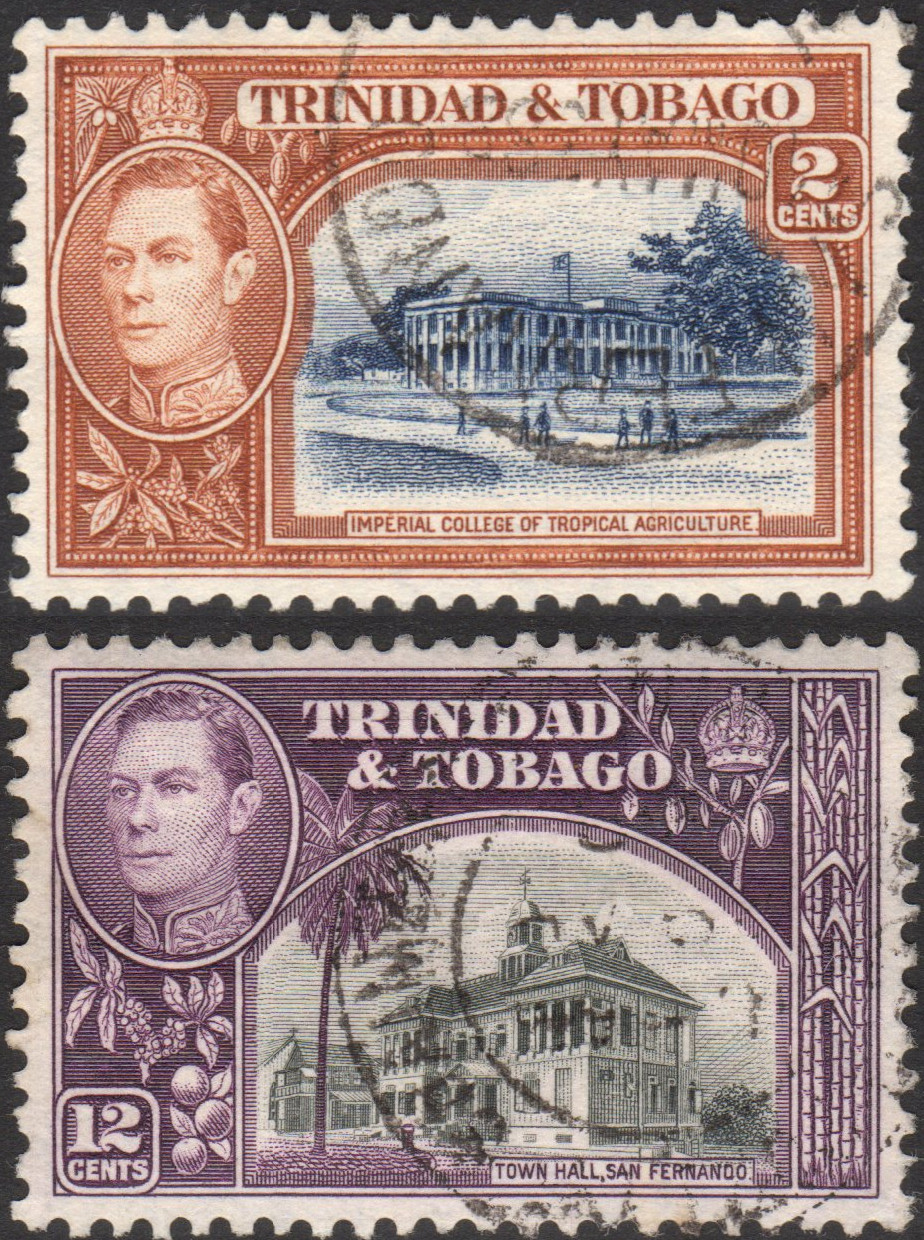
Stamps issued in Trinidad and Tobago, then a British territory (1938 – )

All of the West Indies are within the Bean Belt, and coffee is produced in all of them, albeit in varying quantities. One of the most famous is Jamaica, which produces Blue Mountain. During the British period, when tea was the national beverage in the UK, Blue Mountains happened to be served with dessert at a royal dinner. and became a royal treasure, earning it the reputation of being the world's finest variety. To commemorate the 300th anniversary of Jamaica becoming a British territory in 1955, a stamp was issued the following year, 1956, with the Blue Mountains as the design. Four variants with different coloured frames were issued in different denominations.

In Cuba, where coffee was grown earlier than in the West Indies, three commemorative stamps were issued in 1952, 200 years after the first coffee tree was transplanted. In 1960, three different Christmas stamps were issued with different background colors and denominations. These depicted white coffee flowers and hymn sheet music.

In Haiti, which occupies the western third of the island of Hispaniola, and the Dominican Republic, which occupies the eastern two-thirds, coffee is also a major product, along with sugar cane and cocoa. In Haiti, an elaborate intaglio print issued in 1928 has a central design of a branch with coffee flowers and fruit. The Dominican Republic has issued six ordinary stamps of different colors and denominations with the same design of cocoa and coffee on a branch, issued in 1961.

In Trinidad and Tobago, then a British territory, a two-cent stamp issued between 1938 and 1941 depicts the building of the Agricultural College, while a 12-cent stamp depicts the public hall of the city of San Fernando, both with a branch of a coffee tree bearing fruit on the outer border.

In Guadeloupe, a French overseas department, a stamp issued in 1947 depicted two women harvesting coffee.

=== South America ===
==== Brazil ====
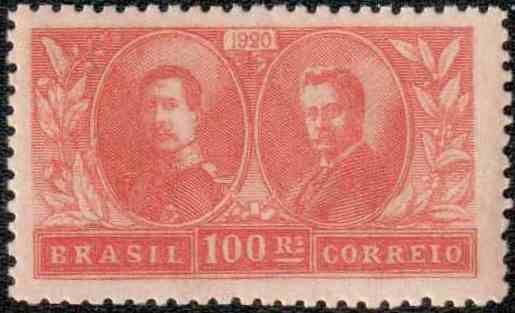
Commemorative stamp issued in Brazil to commemorate the visit of King Albert of Belgium (1920)

South America is the world's largest coffee-producing region, with Brazil being the world's largest producer. Brazil has issued numerous coffee stamps. Commemorative stamp issued in 1920 for the visit of King and Queen Albert of Belgium to Brazil, showing King Albert and President Pessoa's portraits side by side, with a branch of a coffee tree bearing fruit to the right of President Pessoa.

In 1928, a coffee stamp was issued to commemorate the 200th anniversary of the introduction of coffee to Brazil.

In Brazil, coffee scented stamps were launched in 2001.

Coffee stamps in Brazil

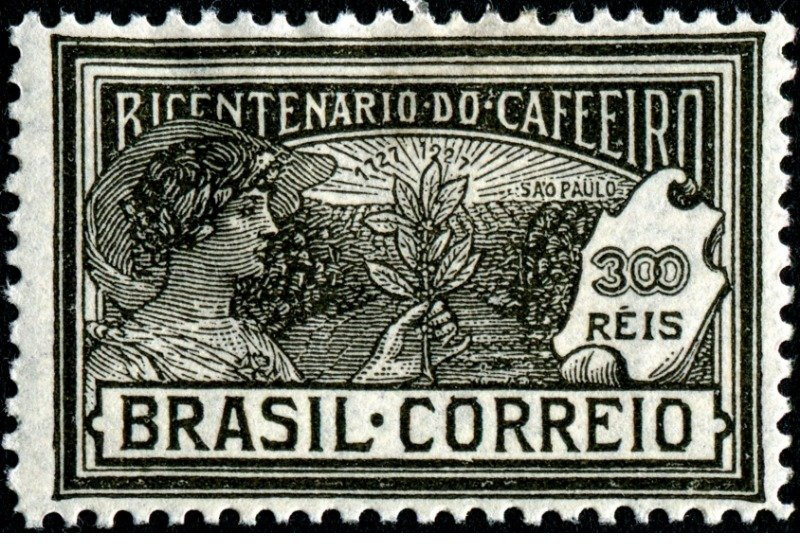
1928

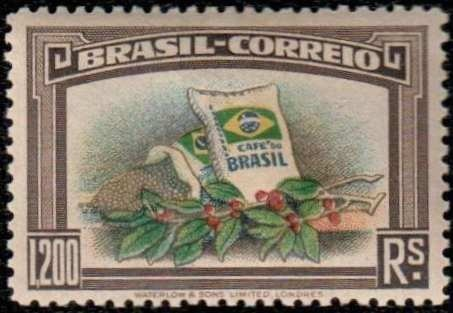
1938

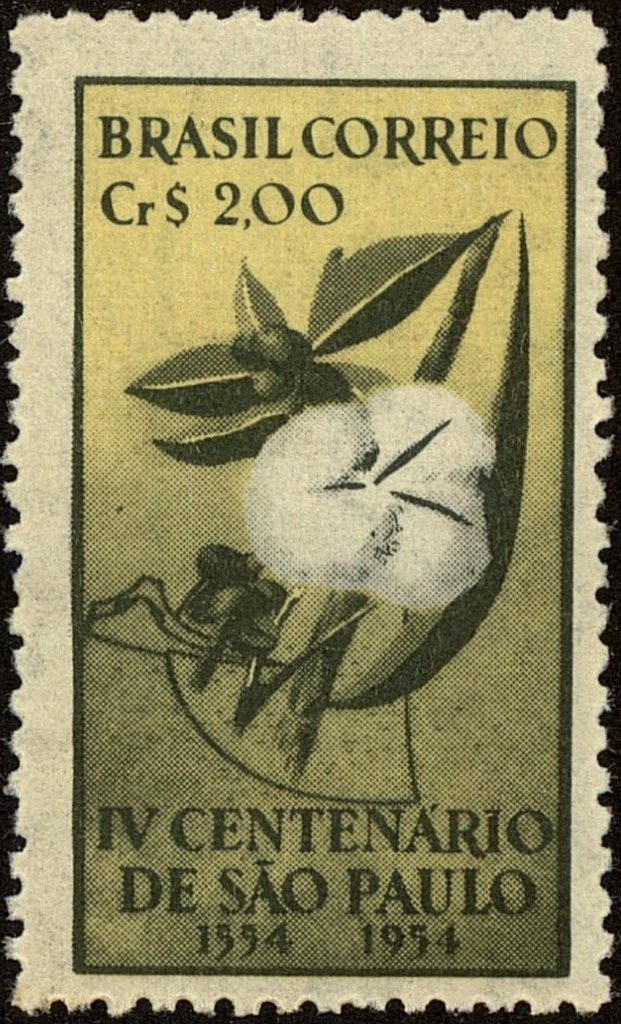
1953

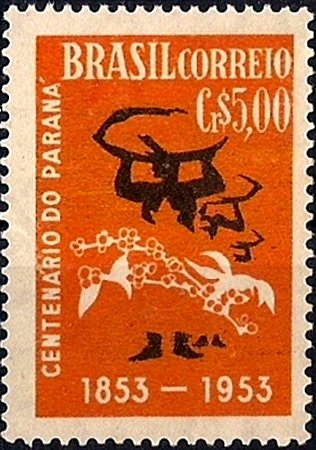
1953

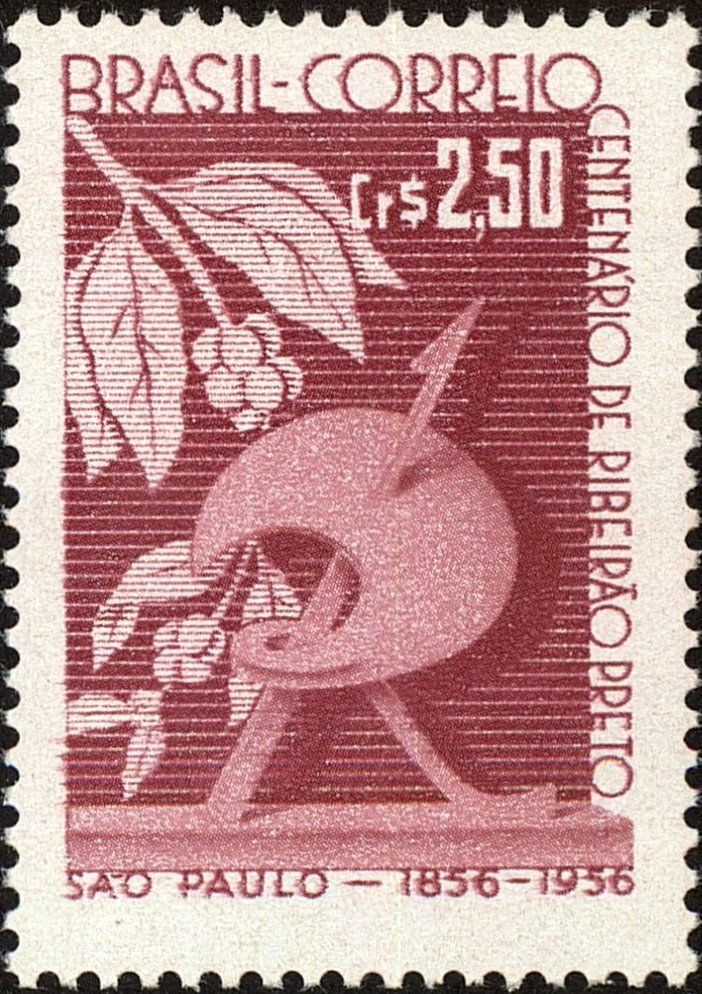
1957

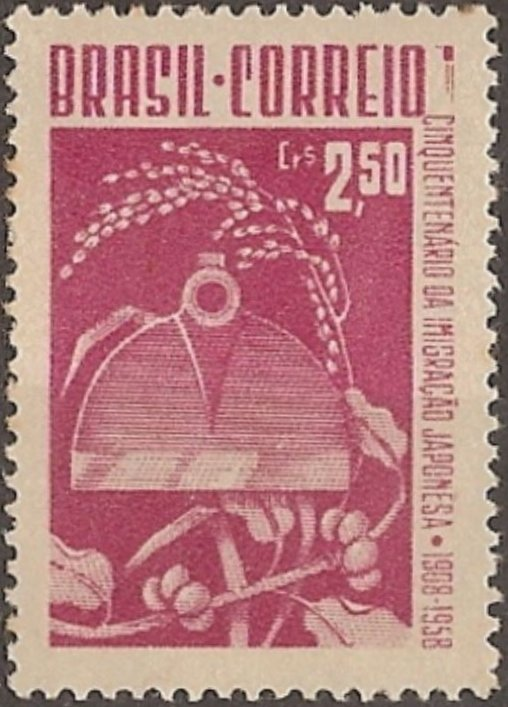
A commemorative stamp was issued in Brazil to mark the 50th anniversary of Japanese immigration. It depicts rice and coffee trees above and below agricultural implements. (1958)

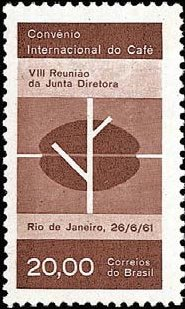
1961

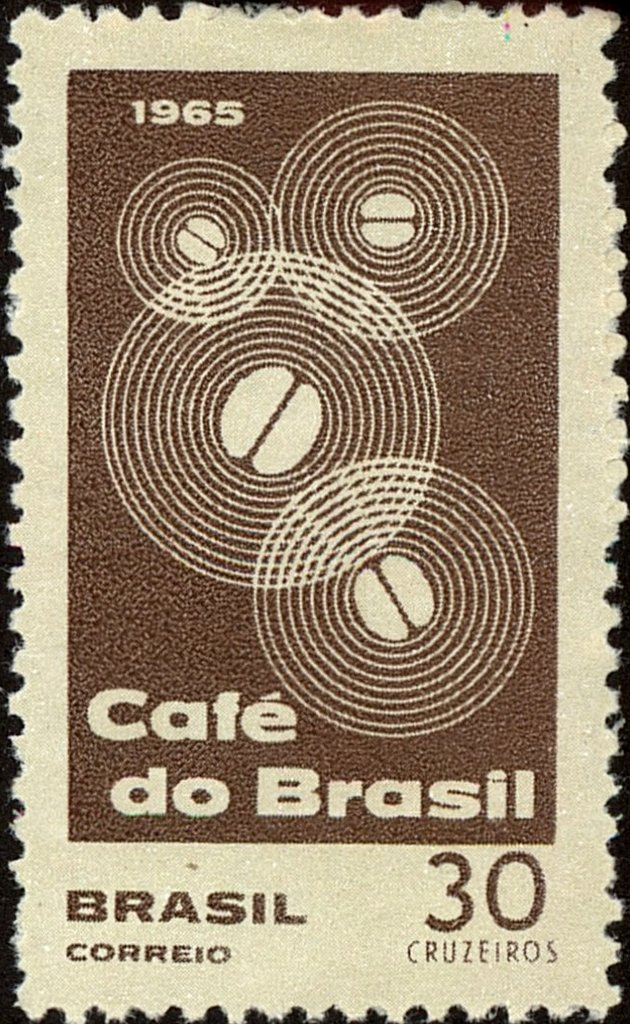
1965

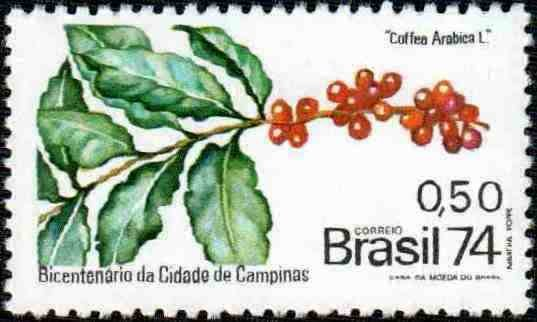
1974

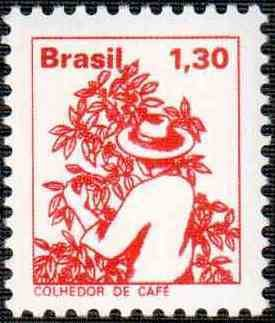
1977

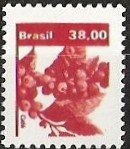
1983

==== Colombia ====
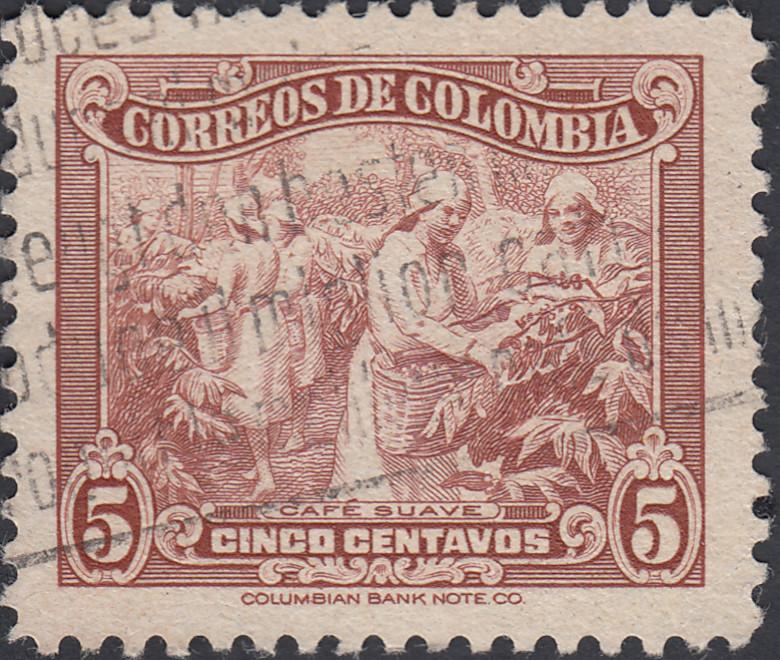
Stamps issued in 1939

Colombia is also a leading coffee producer and, along with Brazil, has issued many coffee stamps.

A stamp issued in 1932 shows a man harvesting coffee, and it can be seen that the coffee tree is a cultivated coffee tree, which unlike the wild, is controlled to a height of two to three meters.

A postage stamp issued in 1956 shows a portrait of the world's longest-lived man, Javier Pereira, who is believed to have lived to be 167 years old, with the words "No se preocupe, tome mucho café, fume un buen cigarro." (Don't worry, drink a lot of coffee, smoke a good cigarette.) which he said was the secret of his long life.

In 1959, after the country's representative, Luz Marina Zuluaga, won the Miss Universe pageant in 1958, a commemorative stamp was issued with the national flower, the orchid, on the winner's left and a branch of a coffee tree with fruit on the right.

In 1989, Colombia issued a stamp featuring a map of the world with the producing countries that are members of the International Coffee Organization painted in red and the consuming countries in green.

==== Other South America ====
Venezuela, Peru and Suriname are also known to issue coffee stamps.

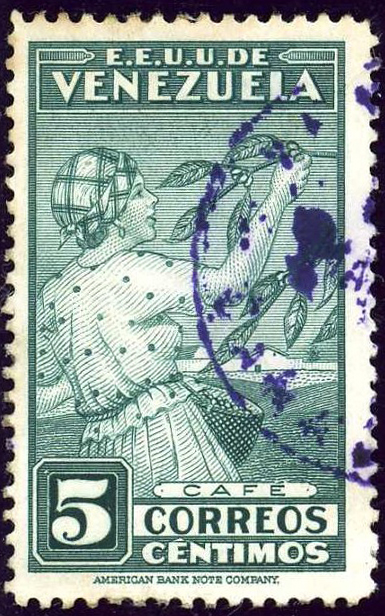
Venezuela, 1938

=== Asia ===
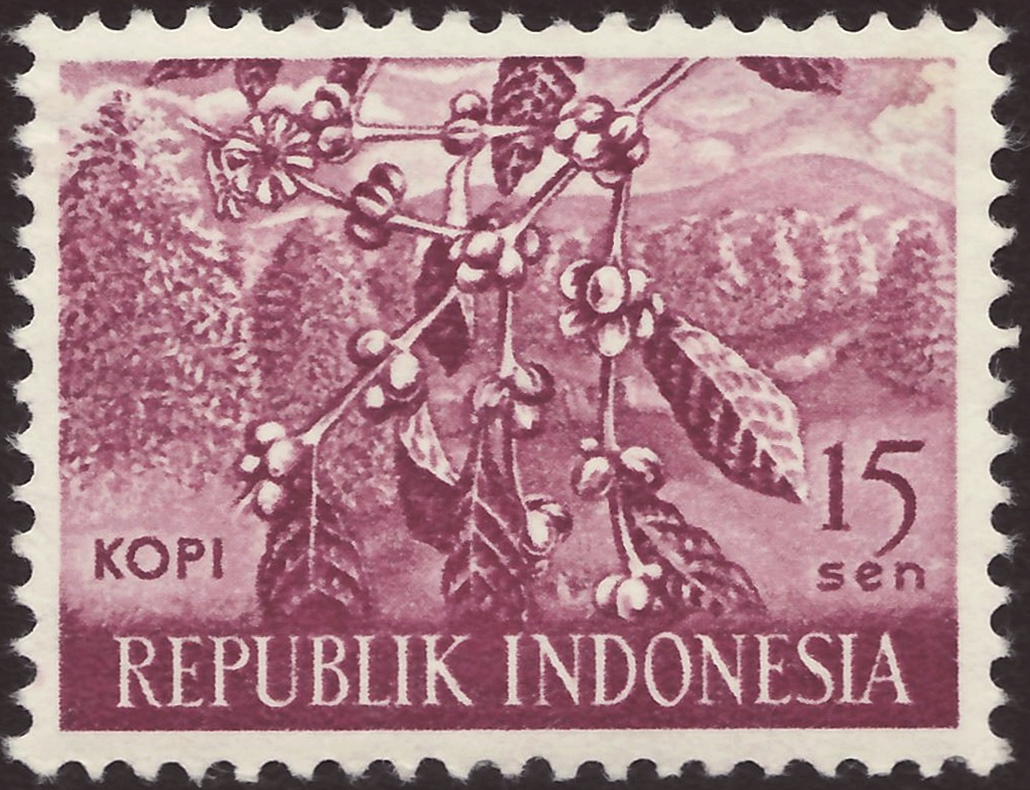
One of the stamps issued in Indonesia to promote agro-forestry industry, 1960

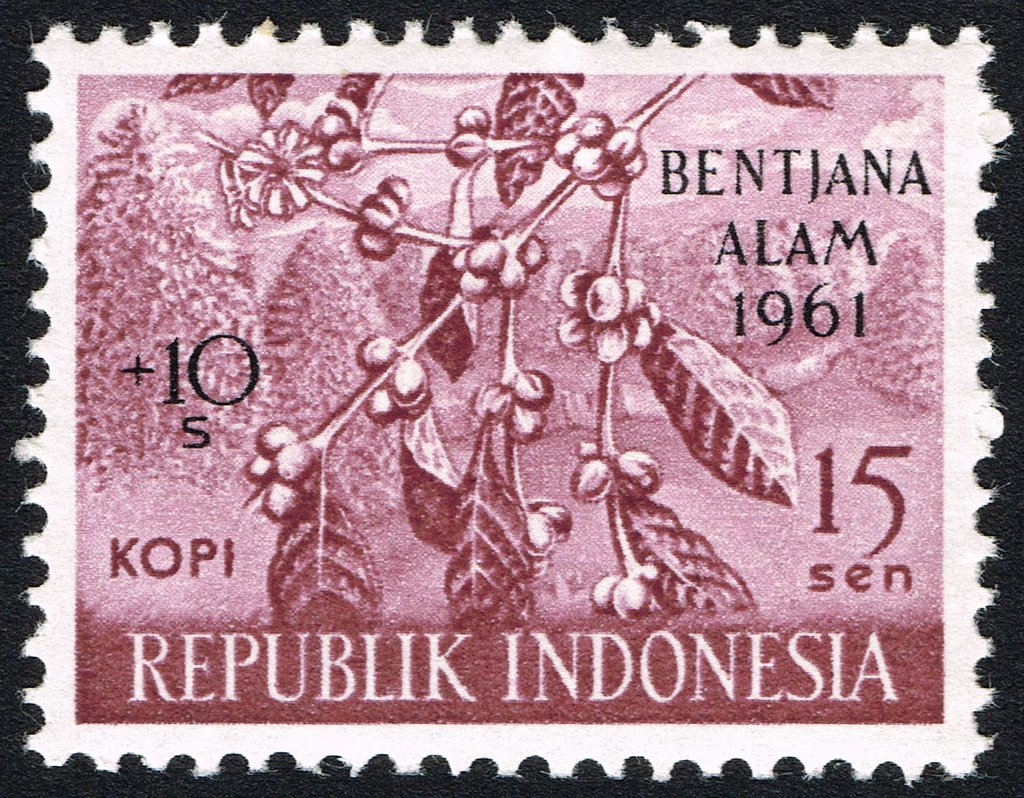
Donation amount imprinted above (1961)

India is believed to have brought back coffee plants by Muslim pilgrims from the Middle East. The Dutch people brought it to Indonesia. Coffee is therefore produced from India to South-East Asia, but few coffee stamps have been issued.

In 1960, a set of eight stamps issued by Indonesia on the theme of promoting agro-forestry industry featured coffee, along with oil palm, sugarcane, tobacco, tea, coconut palm, rubber and rice. It depicts a branch of a coffee tree bearing fruit, and was issued at a face value of 15 cents, but a 10-cent donation for flood relief in the following year, 1961, is known to have been added to the printing.

In 2008, Laos issued a stamp promoting its coffee.

In Japan, a commemorative stamp for the "Japan-Brazil Year of Exchange" was issued in 2008. It is a set of two stamps, one on the left side with a visa stamp from the beginning of emigration to Brazil, and the other on the right side with the Kasato Maru, which brought the first immigrants to Brazil, each with a coffee bean on it.

In 2021, stamps with "Iced Coffee" and "An toast Pudding, and Coffee" are being sold under the theme of "Food of Nagoya."

Vietnam also issues coffee stamps. In Vietnam, coffee scented stamps were sold in 2022.

==== India ====
The first coffee stamp in India was issued in 1968.

In 2017, coffee scented stamps were sold in Bangalore, India.

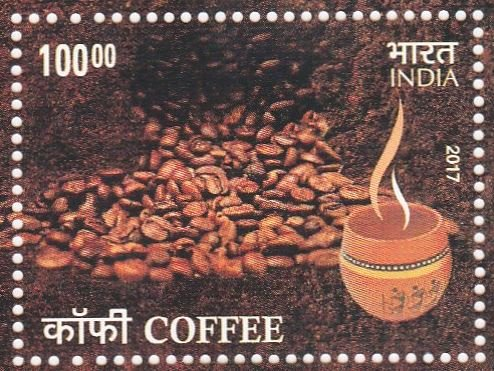
India, 2017, coffee scented stamp

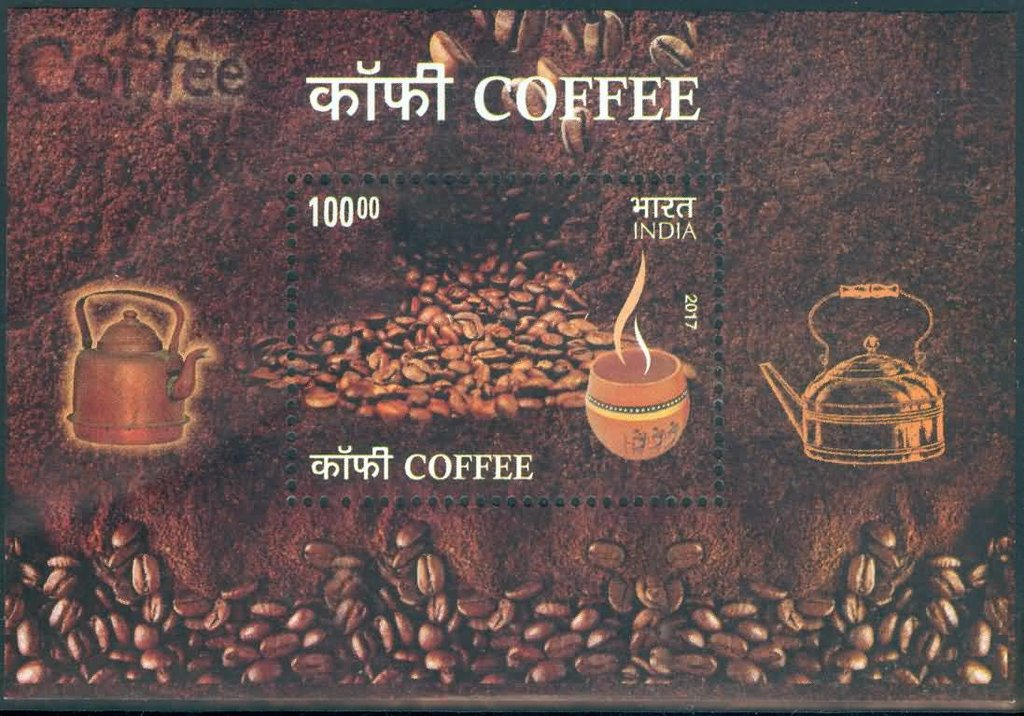
India, 2017

=== Oceania ===
In Oceania, coffee is also grown in the Coffee Belt region. Of these regions, Papua New Guinea depicted coffee on one of the eight stamps issued in 1958 to promote agriculture, forestry, and livestock production. The red fruit on the dark green leafed branches of the coffee tree is a beautiful postage stamp. Papua New Guinea also issued a coffee stamp in 2010, this time depicting coffee from germination to fruition on a set of four stamps.

In 2002, New Caledonia issued stamps known as coffee stamps. They are coffee-scented stamps, consisting of three sheets featuring a coffee bean, a roasting scene, and a café.

A stamp issued in Vanuatu in 2011 depicts a woman wearing hibiscus and a cappuccino.

Coffee is also grown in Hawaii, and Kona coffee is prominent as the only coffee growing region in the United States, but no stamps are known about it.

Coffee can also be seen on a stamp issued by Australia in 1988 jointly with New Zealand to commemorate the bicentennial of the friendship of the country. The cartoon depicts a koala and a kiwi, and the koala can be seen holding a cup of coffee. Also, one of the six-packs issued by New Zealand in 1999 to commemorate the millennium, has a plain white coffee cup as the design. This was once a specialty on New Zealand's trams. In addition, New Zealand also issued a variant stamp in the shape of a coffee cup in 2005.

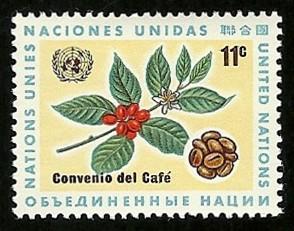
International Coffee Agreement, published by the United Nations Postal Service, 1966

=== United Nations ===
The United Nations Postal Service also has a coffee stamp issued by the United Nations Postal Administration; it was issued in 1966 to commemorate the International Coffee Agreement signed in 1962, and was printed by the Printing National Printing Bureau in Japan.

== See also ==
- Postage stamp
- Stamp collecting

== Sources ==
- Ito, Hiroshi. コーヒー事典 [Coffee Encyclopedia] (in Japanese). HOIKUSHA Publishers <Colorbooks 869>. ISBN 4-586-50869-8.
- Baba, Chie. "Free Talk 歴史、文化、味と香り。魅力あふれる、コーヒー切手の旅へ。" [Free Talk History, culture, taste and aroma. A fascinating journey through coffee stamps.]. Coffee Break (in Japanese) (70). All Japan Coffee Association: 20.
- UCC Coffee Museum (2016-10-30). 図説 コーヒー [Illustrated guide to coffee] (in Japanese). Kawade Shobō Shinsha. p. 101. ISBN 978-4-309-76243-2.
- 「切手の博物館ニューズ」『郵趣 (雑誌)』第69巻4号（通巻794号）、公益財団法人日本郵趣協会、2015年4月。
- 「切手の博物館ニューズ」『郵趣』第69巻5号（通巻795号）、公益財団法人日本郵趣協会、2015年5月。
- 「切手の博物館ニューズ」『郵趣』第69巻6号（通巻796号）、公益財団法人日本郵趣協会、2015年6月。
- Tsuruhara, Ryuji. "切手に学ぶ珈琲あれこれ (1)" [Various aspects of coffee learned from postage stamps (1)]. コーヒー文化研究 (in Japanese). 17.
- Tsuruhara, Ryuji. "切手に学ぶ珈琲あれこれ (2)" [Various aspects of coffee learned from postage stamps (2)]. コーヒー文化研究 (in Japanese). 18.
- Tsuruhara, Ryuji. "切手に学ぶ珈琲あれこれ (3)" [Various aspects of coffee learned from postage stamps (3)]. コーヒー文化研究 (in Japanese). 19.
- 日本コーヒー文化学会編『コーヒーの事典』株式会社柴田書店、2001年12月。ISBN 978-4-388-35307-1
- Hirabayashi, Toshihiko. "音楽を聴きながら切手の窓からくすりを眺める10 バッハとコーヒー" [Watching Drugs through a postage stamp window while listening to music (10) Bach and coffee]. 薬学図書館 (in Japanese). 62 (2).
