= Stamp collecting =

Collecting of postage stamps and related objects

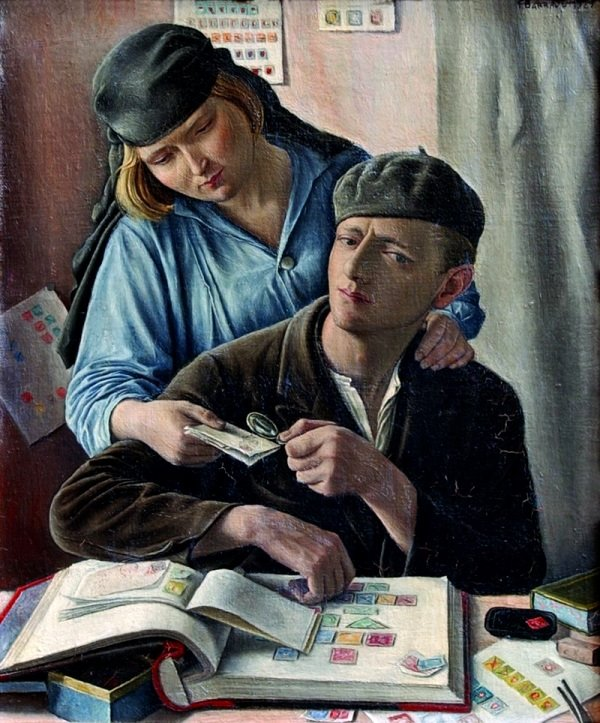
Le Philatéliste by François Barraud (1929)

Stamp collecting is the collecting of postage stamps and related objects. It is an area of philately, which is the study (or combined study and collection) of stamps. It has been one of the world's most popular hobbies since the late nineteenth century with the rapid growth of the postal service, as a stream of new stamps was produced by countries that sought to advertise their distinctiveness through their stamps.

== Collecting ==
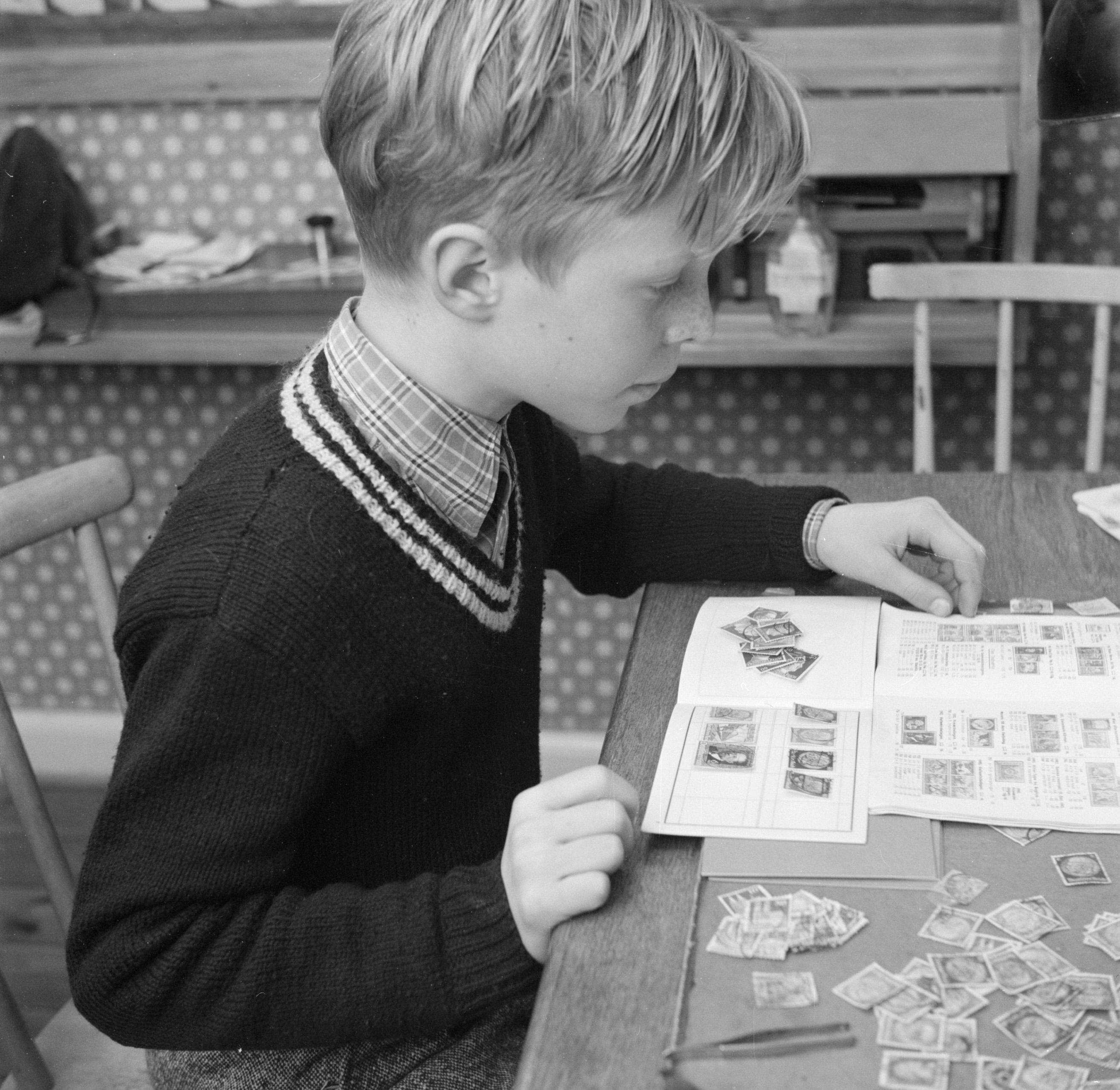
A young stamp collector, 1954

Stamp collecting is generally accepted as one of the areas that make up the wider subject of philately, which is the study of stamps. A philatelist may, but does not have to, collect stamps. It is not uncommon for the term philatelist to be used to mean a stamp collector. Many casual stamp collectors accumulate stamps for sheer enjoyment and relaxation without worrying about details. The creation of a large or comprehensive collection, however, generally requires some philatelic knowledge and will usually contain areas of philatelic studies.

Postage stamps are often collected for their historical value and geographical aspects and also for the many subjects depicted on them, ranging from ships, horses and birds to kings, queens and presidents. Before the era of jet travel, obtaining stamps from far away countries represented a way of learning something about that country and of having a souvenir made in that country.

Sales of postage stamps are an important source of income for some countries whose stamp issues may exceed their postal needs, but have designs that appeal to many stamp collectors.

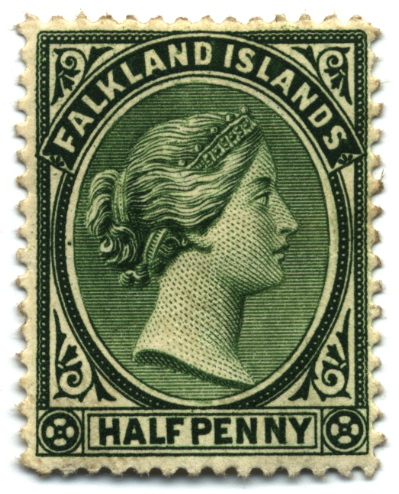
Queen Victoria's profile was a staple on 19th century stamps of the British Empire, shown here on a half-penny stamp of the Falkland Islands, 1891.

== History ==
It has been suggested that John Bourke, Receiver General of Stamp Dues in Ireland, was the first collector. In 1774, he assembled a book of the existing embossed revenue stamps, ranging in value from 6 pounds to half a penny, as well as the hand stamped charge marks that were used with them. His collection is preserved in the Royal Irish Academy, Dublin.

Postage stamp collecting began at the same time that stamps were first issued, and by 1860 thousands of collectors and stamp dealers were appearing around the world as this new study and hobby spread across Europe, European colonies, the United States and other parts of the world.

The first postage stamp, the Penny Black, was issued by Britain in May 1840 and pictured a young Queen Victoria. It was produced without perforations (imperforate) and consequently had to be cut from the sheet with scissors in order to be used. While unused examples of the Penny Black are quite scarce, used examples are quite common, and may be purchased for $20 to $200, depending upon condition.

People started to collect stamps almost immediately. One of the earliest and most notable was John Edward Gray. In 1862, Gray stated that he "began to collect postage stamps shortly after the system was established and before it had become a rage".

Female stamp collectors date from the earliest days of postage stamp collecting. One of the earliest was Adelaide Lucy Fenton who wrote articles in the 1860s for the journal The Philatelist under the name Herbert Camoens.

As the hobby and study of stamps began to grow, stamp albums and stamp related literature began to surface, and by the early 1880s publishers like Stanley Gibbons made a business out of this advent.

Children and teenagers were early collectors of stamps in the 1860s and 1870s. Many adults dismissed it as a childish pursuit but later many of those same collectors, as adults, began to systematically study the available postage stamps and publish books about them. Some stamps, such as the triangular issues of the Cape of Good Hope, have become legendary.

By the early 2000s, stamp collecting was seen to be in decline as the digital world surpassed traditional hobbies even though by 2013, The Wall Street Journal estimated the global number of stamp collectors was around 60 million. However, the hobby's unexpected appeal for a millennial audience was observed in a 2020 article for The Guardian.

== Equipment ==
A few basic items of equipment are recommended for proper stamp collection. Stamp tongs help to handle stamps safely, a magnifying glass helps in viewing fine details and an album is a convenient way to store stamps. The stamps need to be attached to the pages of the album in some way, and stamp hinges are a cheap and simple way to do this. However, hinging stamps can damage them, thus reducing their value; today many collectors prefer more expensive hingeless mounts. Issued in various sizes, these are clear, chemically neutral thin plastic holders that open to receive stamps and are gummed on the back so that they stick to album pages. Another alternative is a stockbook, where the stamps drop into clear pockets without the need for a mount. Stamps should be stored away from light, heat and moisture or they will be damaged.

Stamps can be displayed according to the collector's wishes, by country, topic, or even by size, which can create a display pleasing to the eye. There are no rules and it is entirely a matter for the individual collector to decide. Albums can be commercially purchased, downloaded or created by the collector. In the latter cases, using acid free paper provides better long-term stamp protection.

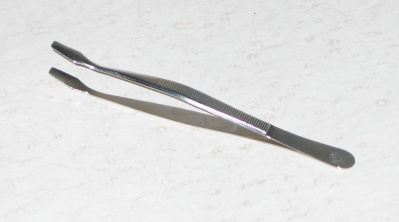
Stamp tongs with rounded tips help to prevent damage to stamps from skin oils and rough handling.

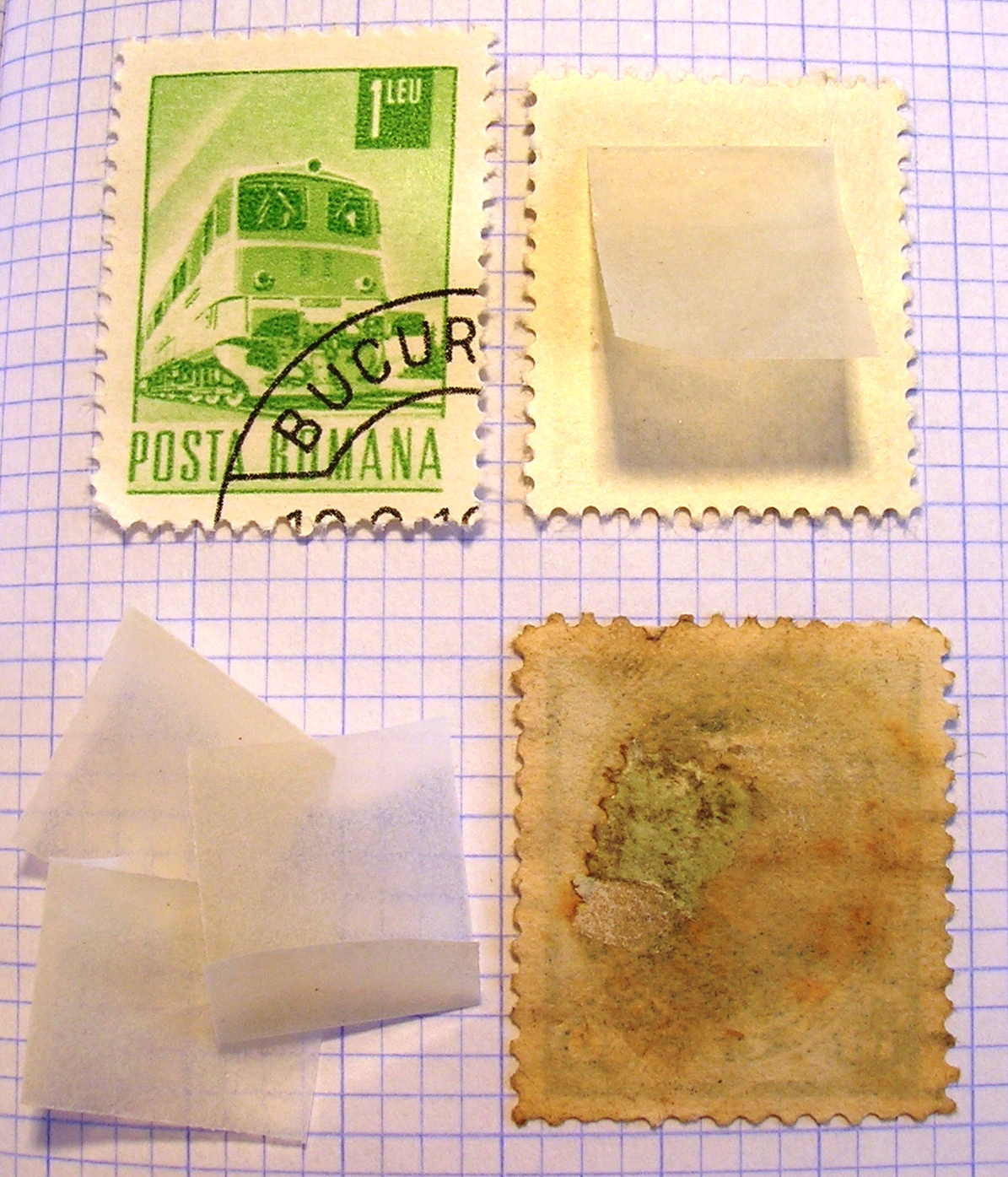
Clockwise from top left: hinge-mounted stamp, stamp about to be hinge-mounted, stamp damaged by a hinge, stamp hinges

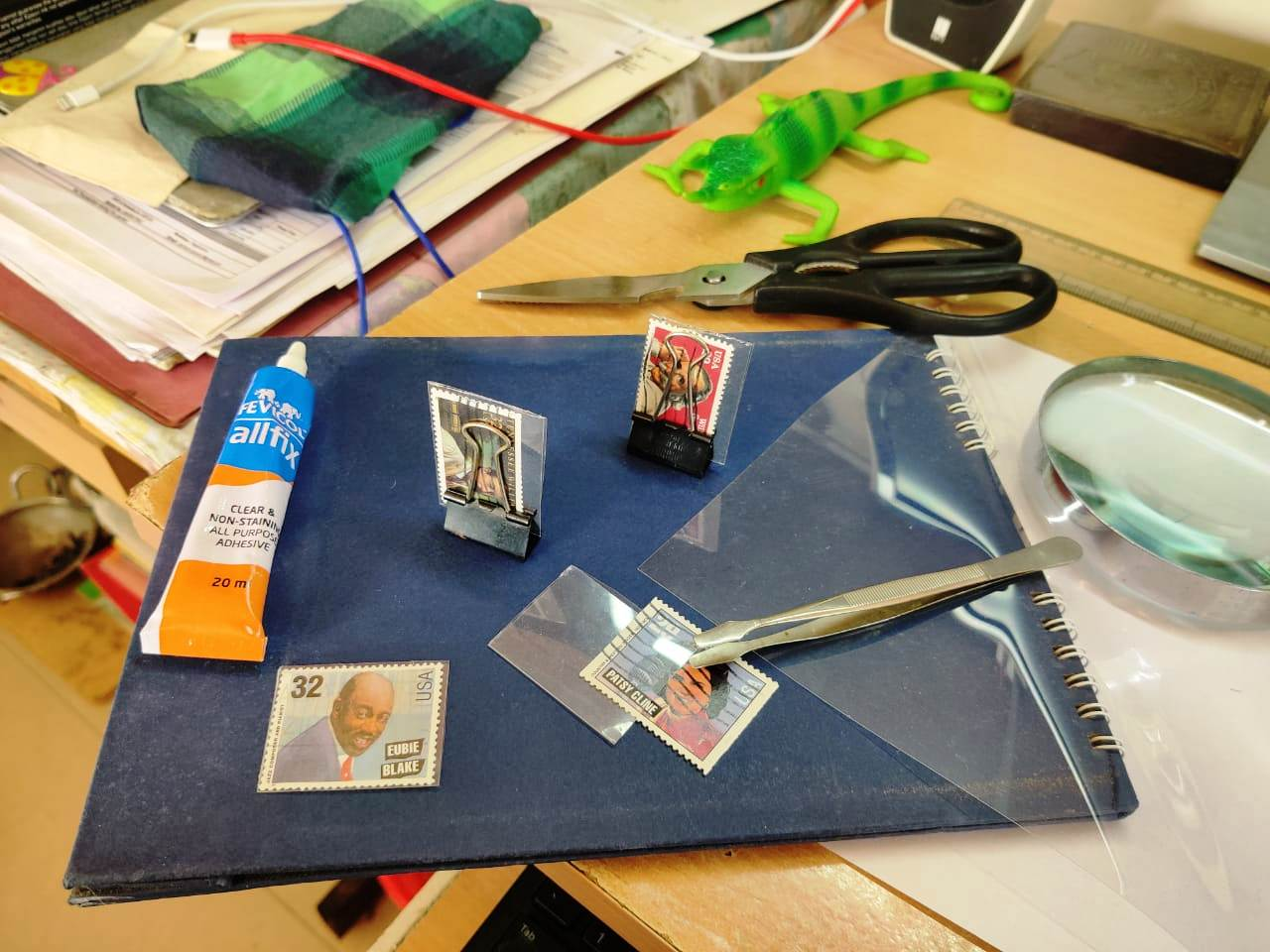
Making stamp mounts at home by hand

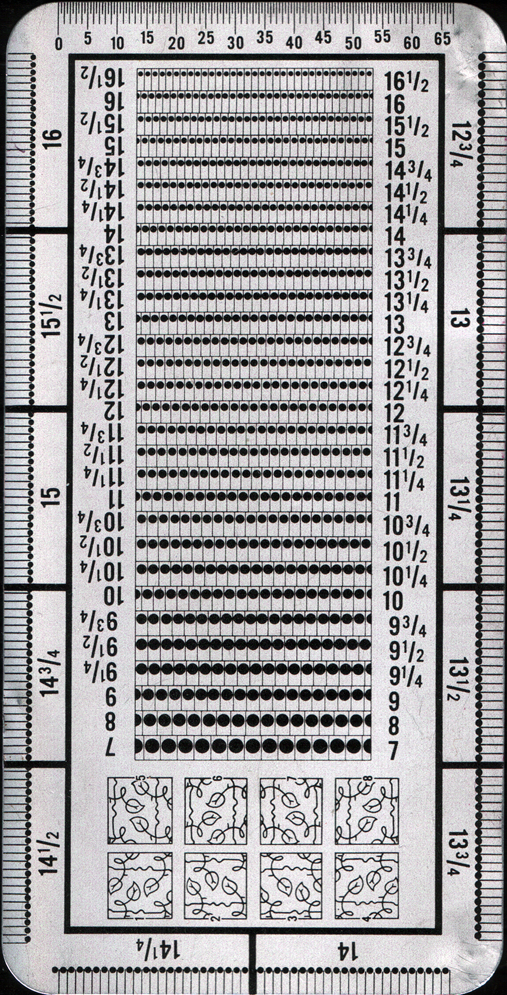
Perforation gauge. Also known as an odontometer.

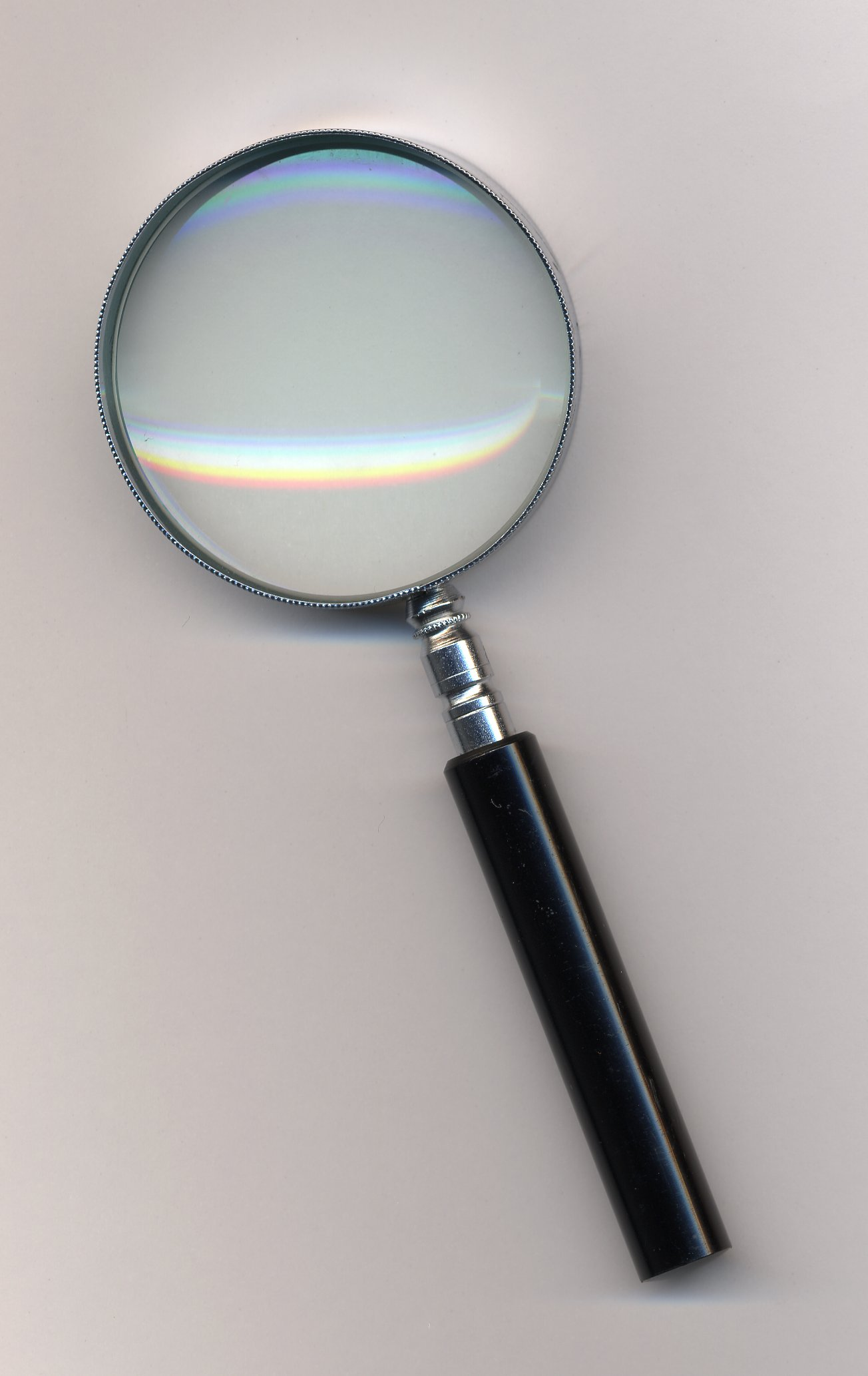
A magnifying glass

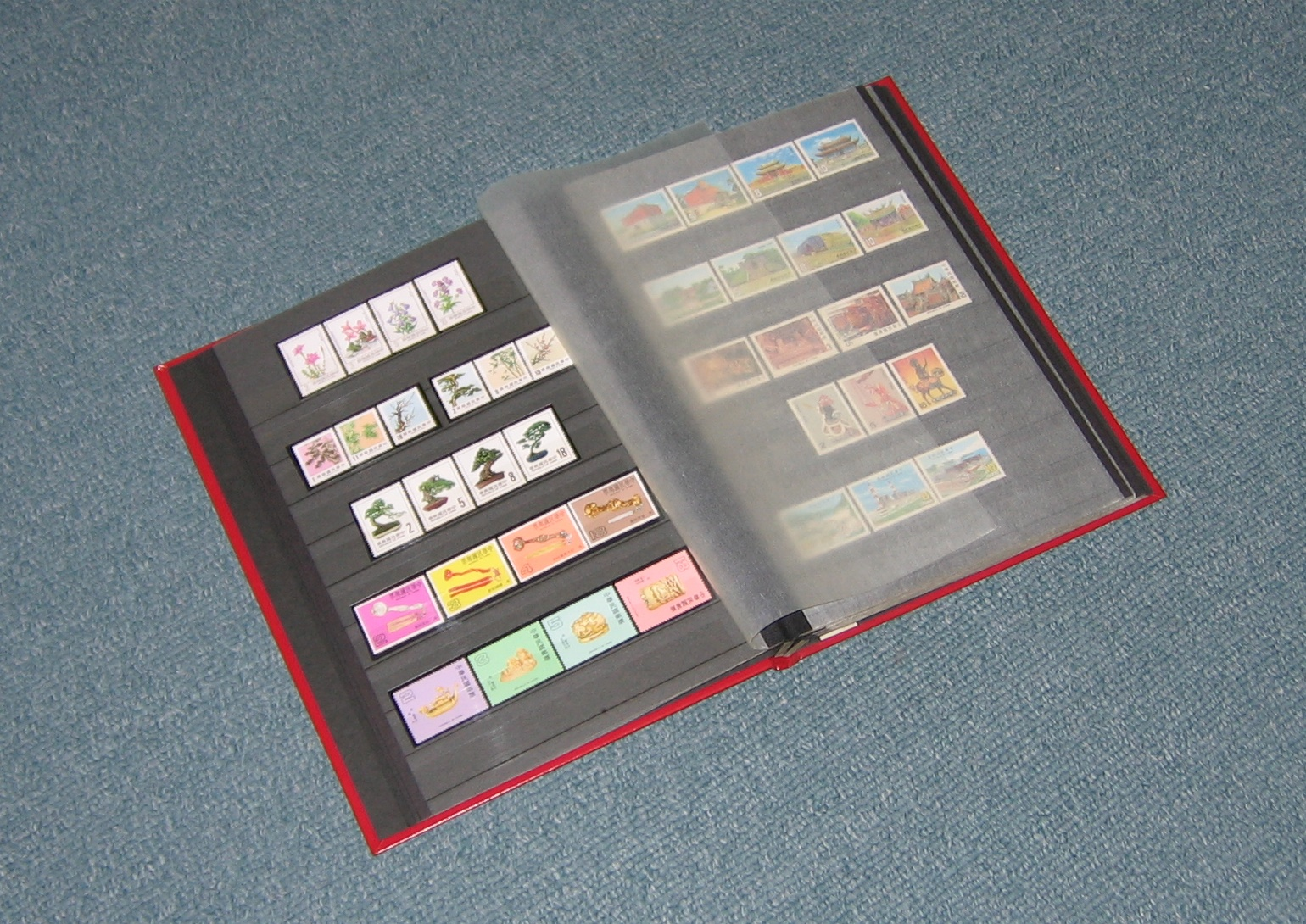
A stockbook with clear plastic pockets is one of the safest ways to store stamps. Some collectors prefer a traditional stamp album.

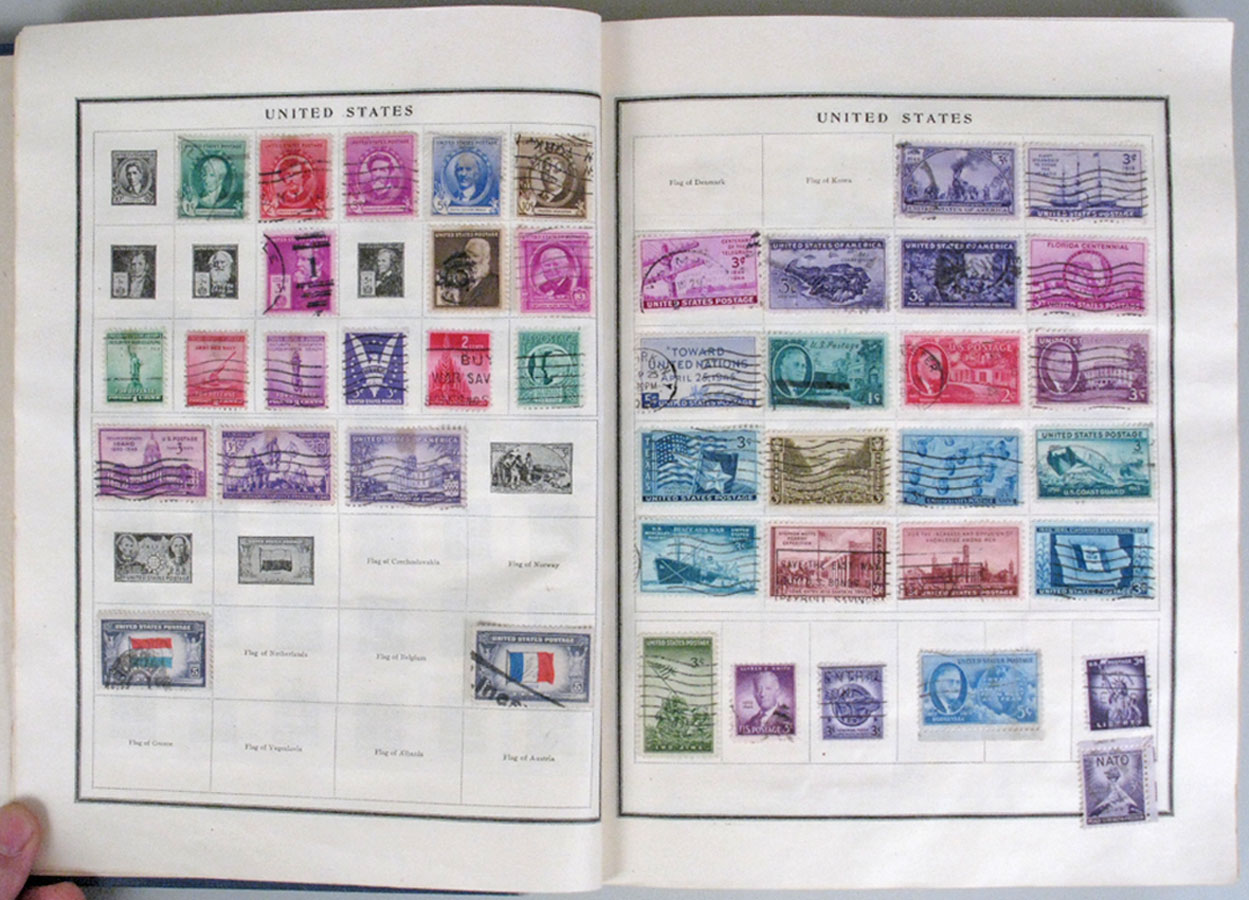
Pre-printed stamp album with United States country pages affixed

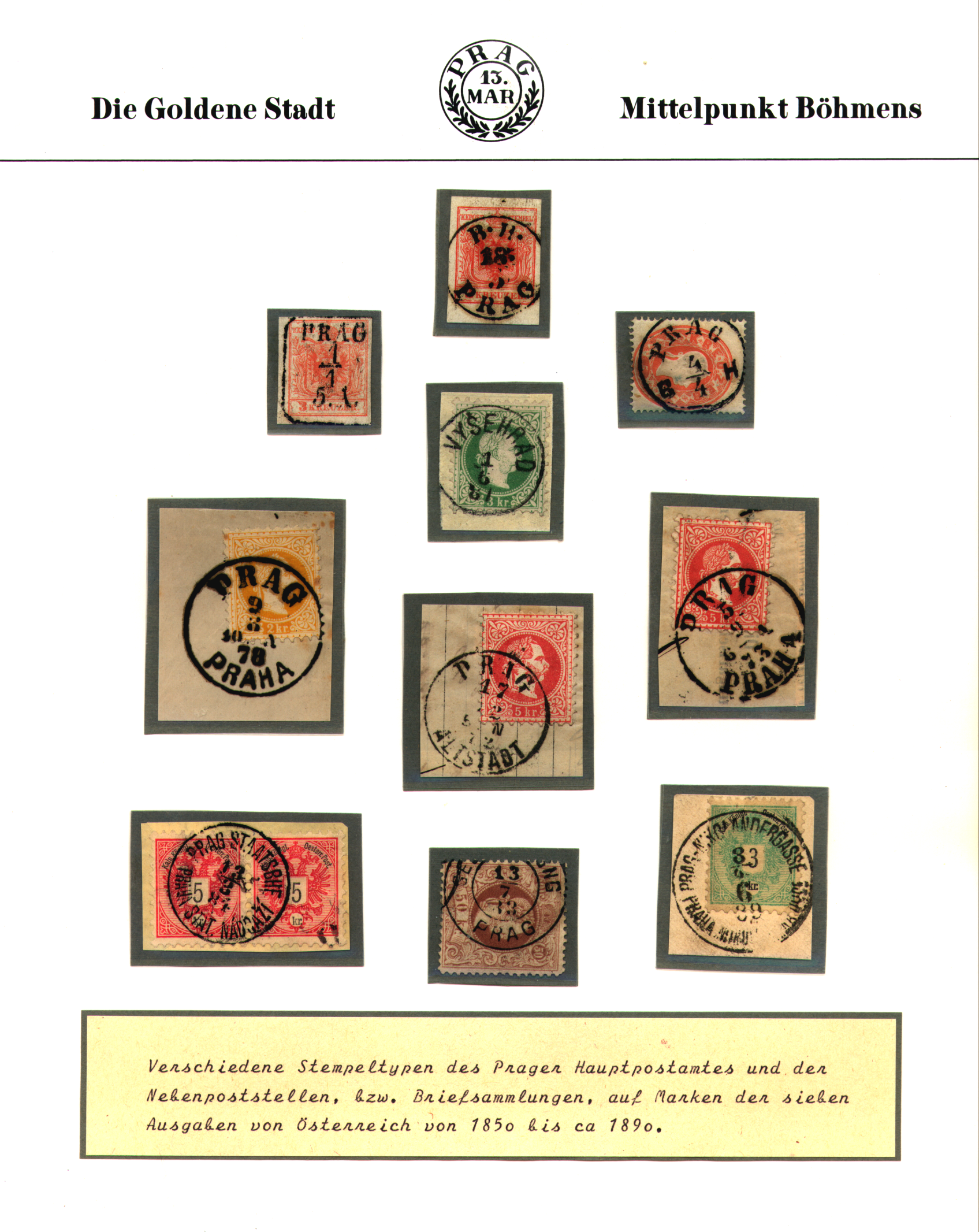
Custom printed loose-left album page displaying stamps postmarked in Prague

== Acquiring stamps ==
The main ways of acquiring stamps are through retail market stamp dealers who have online websites, or post on eBay or other forums, and conduct local stamp show dealer "bourse" events. The way to buy wholesale is to attend auctions and there are many auction companies around the world that offer regular auctions, most lots sold at one advance over the underbidder no matter what the price. These are called unreserved auctions. Reserved auctions are the same except a minimum price or "reserve" is set to ensure the stamp does not sell below this level. If during the auction there are no bidders for the lot at the reserve price then the lot will be left unsold in the auction.

Buying at auction takes knowing the market and what stamps are worth at both a wholesale market level and what they can be then sold for in a retail market. Stamp values are heavily skewed to quality. The same stamp can sell for drastically different prices due to quality. The most sought after stamps are those that are fresh, have white non-toned paper, have no hidden faults like hidden creases or thins, do not have any repairs and have not been regummed with fraudulent gum. Stamp pricing is also based on the look of the stamp, and the stamp that has an image that is very well centered will sell well. Mint (not used) full original gum stamps that have never been hinged will always sell for premiums. It is important to have certificates for rare and high quality stamps to certify they are fault free and genuine in all respects. Foundations like the Vincent Graves Greene are well respected for certifying Canadian stamps. They check for hidden faults like creases, tears and thins as well as lightened cancellations, repairs, reperforated perforations and re-applied (regummed) fake gum.

Stamp list pricing is set in various stamp catalogues. For US and Canada stamps the standard catalogue is the Scott catalogue using Scott numbers. For Canadian stamps there is a specialized catalogue called the Unitrade (which reflects more accurately the actual values of the stamps vs the Scott catalogue values), and for Great Britain and Commonwealth stamps most collectors use Stanley Gibbons catalogues. Typically stamps will sell at auction for a range of 10–30% of catalogue list price, but if the stamp is of the very top quality then the sell price may exceed the catalogue list price. As with many collectables with no inherent value, sell pricing is set by the market bidding on the item at the time.

Many collectors also ask their family and friends to save stamps for them from their mail. Although the stamps received by major businesses and those kept by elderly relatives may be of international and historical interest, the stamps received from family members are often of the definitive sort. Definitives seem mundane but, considering their variety of colours, watermarks, paper differences, perforations and printing errors, they can fill many pages in a collection. Introducing either variety or specific focus to a collection can require the purchasing of stamps, either from a dealer or online. Online stamp collector clubs often contain a platform for buying/selling and trading. Large numbers of relatively recent stamps, often still attached to fragments or envelopes, may be obtained cheaply and easily. Rare and old stamps can also be obtained, but these can be very expensive.

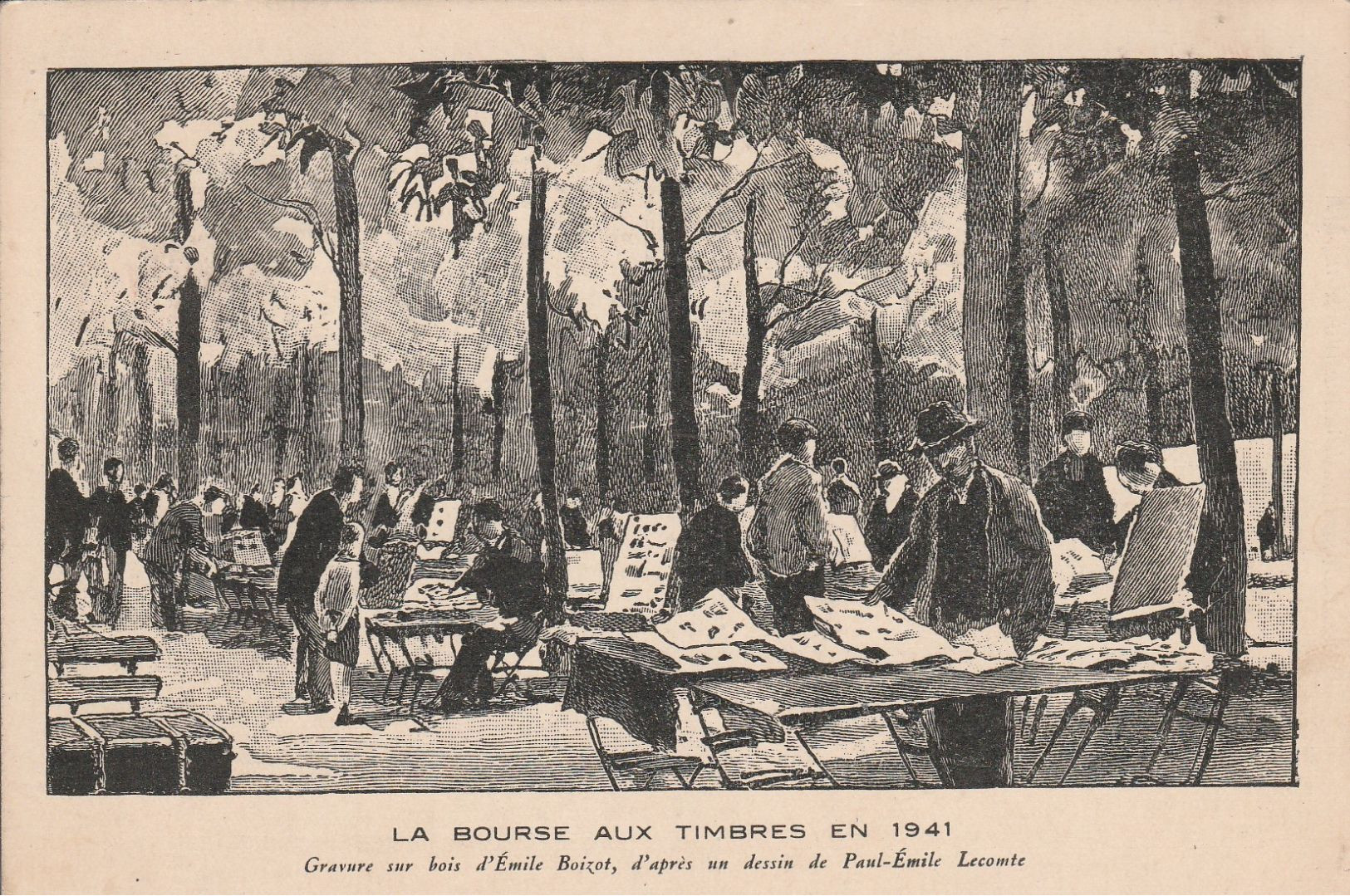
Collectors and dealers at an outdoor French stamp bourse

Duplicate stamps are those a collector already has and are not required, therefore, to fill a gap in a collection. Duplicate stamps can be sold or traded, so they are an important medium of exchange among collectors.

Many dealers sell stamps through the Internet while others have neighborhood shops which are among the best resources for beginning and intermediate collectors. Some dealers also jointly set up week-end stamp markets called "bourses" that move around a region from week to week. One of the most well known bourses is the Carré Marigny in Paris. They also meet collectors at regional exhibitions and stamp shows.

== Collecting specialties ==
A worldwide collection would be enormous, running to thousands of volumes, and would be incredibly expensive to acquire. Many consider that Count Philipp von Ferrary's collection at the beginning of the 20th century was the most complete ever formed. Many collectors limit their collecting to particular countries, certain time periods or particular subjects (called "topicals") like birds or aircraft.

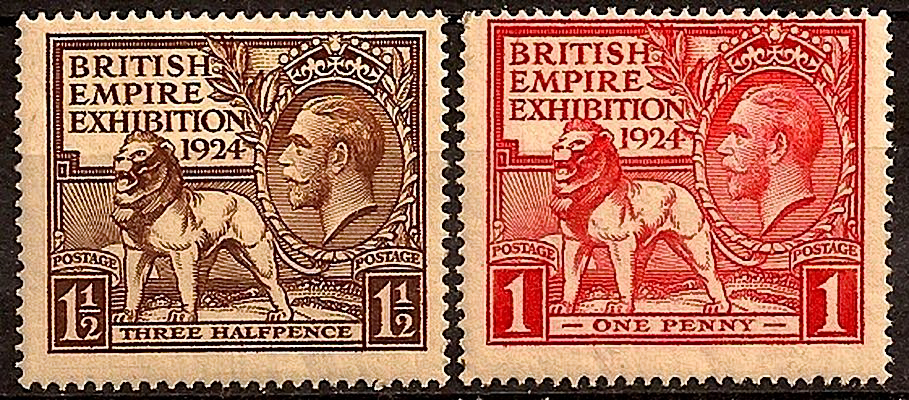
The first UK commemorative stamps, 1924

Some of the more popular collecting areas include:

- Postage stamps – particular countries and/or time periods
  - Airmail stamps – stamps may be required for airmail, which is typically more expensive and has special postage rates.
  - Commemorative stamps – stamps to commemorate events, anniversaries, etc., on sale for a limited time.
  - Definitive stamps – the most common type of stamps
  - Postage due stamps are special stamps applied by a post office to mail bearing insufficient postage. The stamps were issued in several denominations to make up different amounts due.

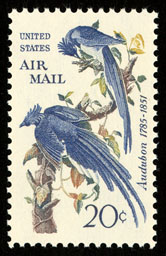
Stamp depicting birds

- Topical stamp collecting – many collectors choose to organize their philatelic collection on the theme of the stamps, covers, or postmarks. Popular topical themes are animals, dogs, cats, butterflies, birds, flowers, art, sports, Olympics, maps, Disney, scouting, space, ships, Americana (topics relating to the US), stamps on stamps, famous people, chess, Chinese new year, and many others.
  - Birds on stamps
  - Cats on stamps
  - Coffee on stamps
  - Ships on stamps
  - Insects on stamps
  - People on stamps
  - Stamps on stamps
- Postal stationery – includes government-issued postal cards, aerograms, letter card, wrappers, envelopes, etc., that usually have an imprinted stamp.
- Sheets
  - Sheetlets – this is a format that is now issued regularly by postal administrations. Instead of issuing stamps in large sheets of 40, 100 or even 200 stamps, smaller sheetlets with 20 to 24 stamps are issued with a large selvedge area which may incorporate part of the stamp design or theme.
  - Souvenir sheets – many postal services sometimes release stamps in a format that look like a sheet with a big picture. Various parts of the picture can be torn out and used as postage stamps. Souvenir sheets should be distinguished from souvenir cards, which are souvenirs of a philatelic meeting or exhibition but are not valid for postage.
  - Miniature sheet – is very similar to a souvenir sheet, being in a sheetlet with a single or a number of stamps embedded in it.
  - Corner blocks or plate blocks – compose a block of stamps from one of the four corners of the stamp sheet. Collectors usually opt for a block of four stamps, complete with the selvage area which will sometimes have the printing details on it.
  - Coil strips – Pairs or more of stamps from rolls, premium ones showing the plate number or a coil line pair which shows the seam between the edges of the plate.
- Revenue stamps – stamps issued to pay taxes.
  - Federal Duck Stamps (stamps for duck hunting licenses, mainly U.S. with some other countries such as Canada and New Zealand)
- First day cover (FDCs) – envelopes with stamps attached and canceled on the first day that the stamp was issued. Most modern FDCs bear designs, called "cachets", related to the theme of the stamp issued.
- Maximum cards – these are postcards where the stamp is on the same side as the picture and they have a close connection.
- Souvenir pages – with first day canceled stamps on a page describing all design, printing and issuing details. These are similar to first day covers except that they are issued as printed sheets of paper instead of envelopes, and the specification of the stamp is printed by the official source.
- Cinderella stamps – stamp-like labels that are not valid for postage.
- Postmarks or postal markings in general.

== Organizations ==
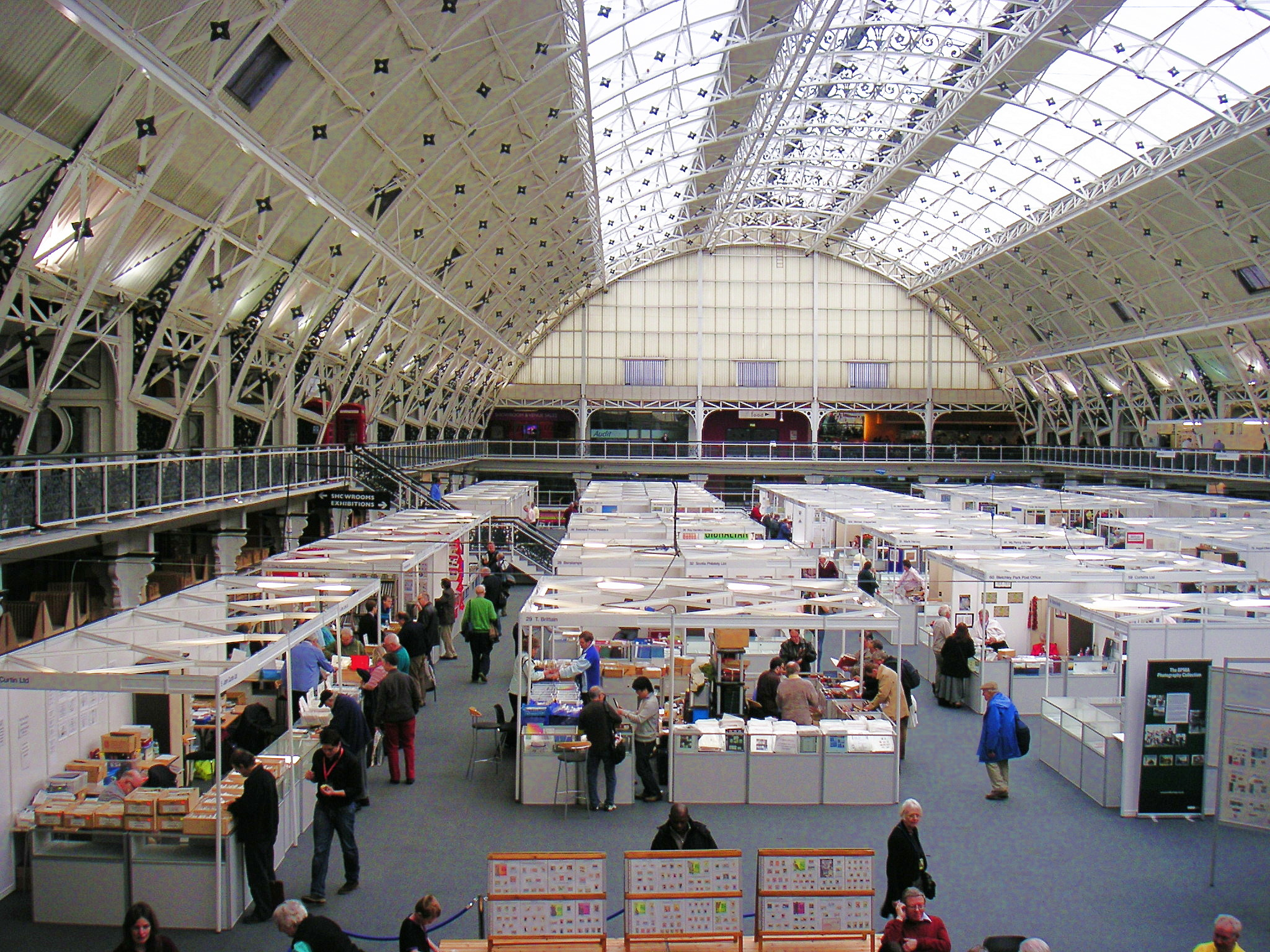
A large stamp show of Stampex 2011 containing a bourse at which collectors and dealers meet

There are thousands of organizations for collectors: local stamp clubs, special-interest groups, and national organizations. Most nations have a national collectors' organization, including the American Philatelic Society (APS) in the United States; the Royal Philatelic Society London and Philatelic Traders Society in United Kingdom; and the Royal Philatelic Society of Canada. The Internet has greatly expanded the availability of information and made it easier to obtain stamps and other philatelic material. The American Topical Association is now a part of the APS and promotes thematic collecting as well as encouraging sub-groups of numerous topics. The Collectors Club, often referred to as the Collectors Club of New York, is a private club and philatelic society in New York City. Founded in 1896, it is one of the oldest existing philatelic societies in the United States. This club like many others has made the transition to Zoom virtual meetings due to Covid and has decided to keep the forum for the future as membership and attendance at club events has grown substantially since they have made their meetings accessible via the internet.

Stamp clubs and philatelic societies can add a social aspect to stamp collecting and provide a forum where novices can meet experienced collectors. Although such organizations are often advertised in stamp magazines and online, the relatively small number of collectors – especially outside urban areas – means that a club may be difficult to set up and sustain. The Internet partially solves this problem, as the association of collectors online is not limited by geographical distance. For this reason, many highly specific stamp clubs have been established on the Web, with international membership.

Organizations such as the Cinderella Stamp Club (UK) retain hundreds of members interested in a specific aspect of collecting. Social organizations, such as the Lions Club and Rotary International, have also formed stamp collecting groups specific to those stamps that are issued from many countries worldwide that display the organization's logo.

== Rare stamps ==
Publication on the US Classics

Rare stamps are often old and many have interesting stories attached to them. Some include:

- British Guiana 1c magenta is the world's most famous and valuable rare stamp.
- Canada 12d Penny Black
- Canada 2c Large Queen on laid paper
- Hawaiian Missionary Issue
- United States "Inverted Jenny" (which is actually a printing error)
- United States "1-cent Z grill"
- United States One Dollar Trans-Mississippi Issue "Cattle in the Storm" – widely considered to be America's Most Beautiful Stamp
- The Three-Skilling Yellow of Sweden was sold for CHF 2.88 million (then about $2,300,000) in 1996 and again for an undisclosed amount in 2010.
- Mauritius "Post Office" issue. David Feldman sold a Blue Mauritius stamp for CHF 1,610,000 (approx. $1.1 million) in 1993. An orange stamp was sold for CHF 1,725,000 (approx $1.2 million) in 1993.
- British Penny Red plate 77

Early stamps of the United States are known as classics. Collectors are able to establish the exact position of a stamp on the original sheet of 200 stamps. Rare stamps are often expertized.

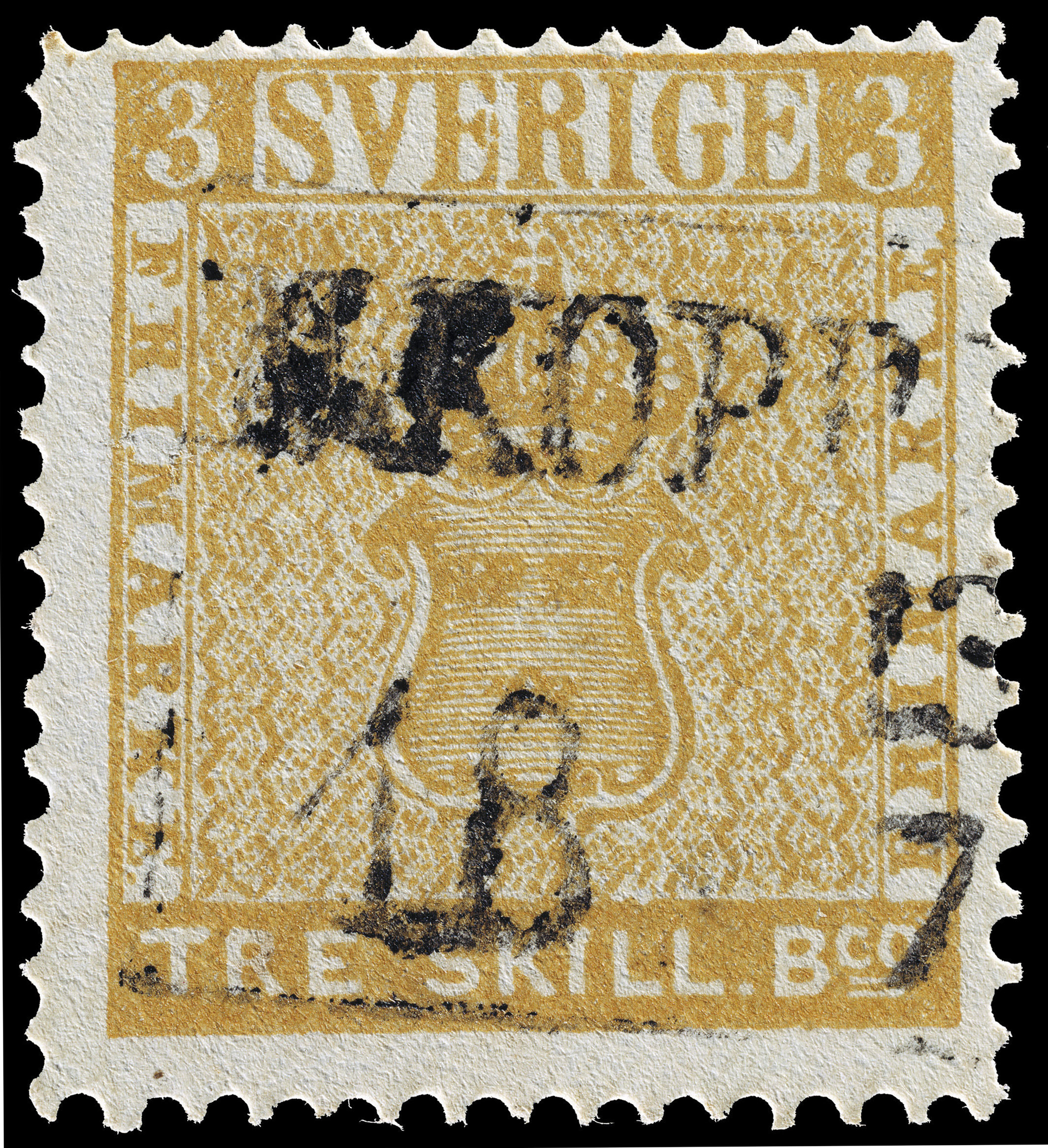
Three-Skilling Yellow

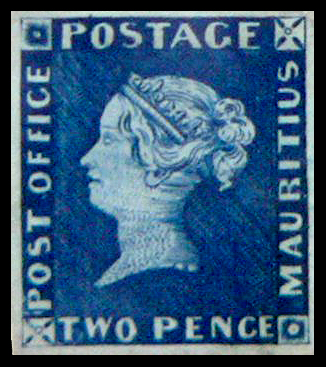
Blue Mauritius "Post Office" stamp

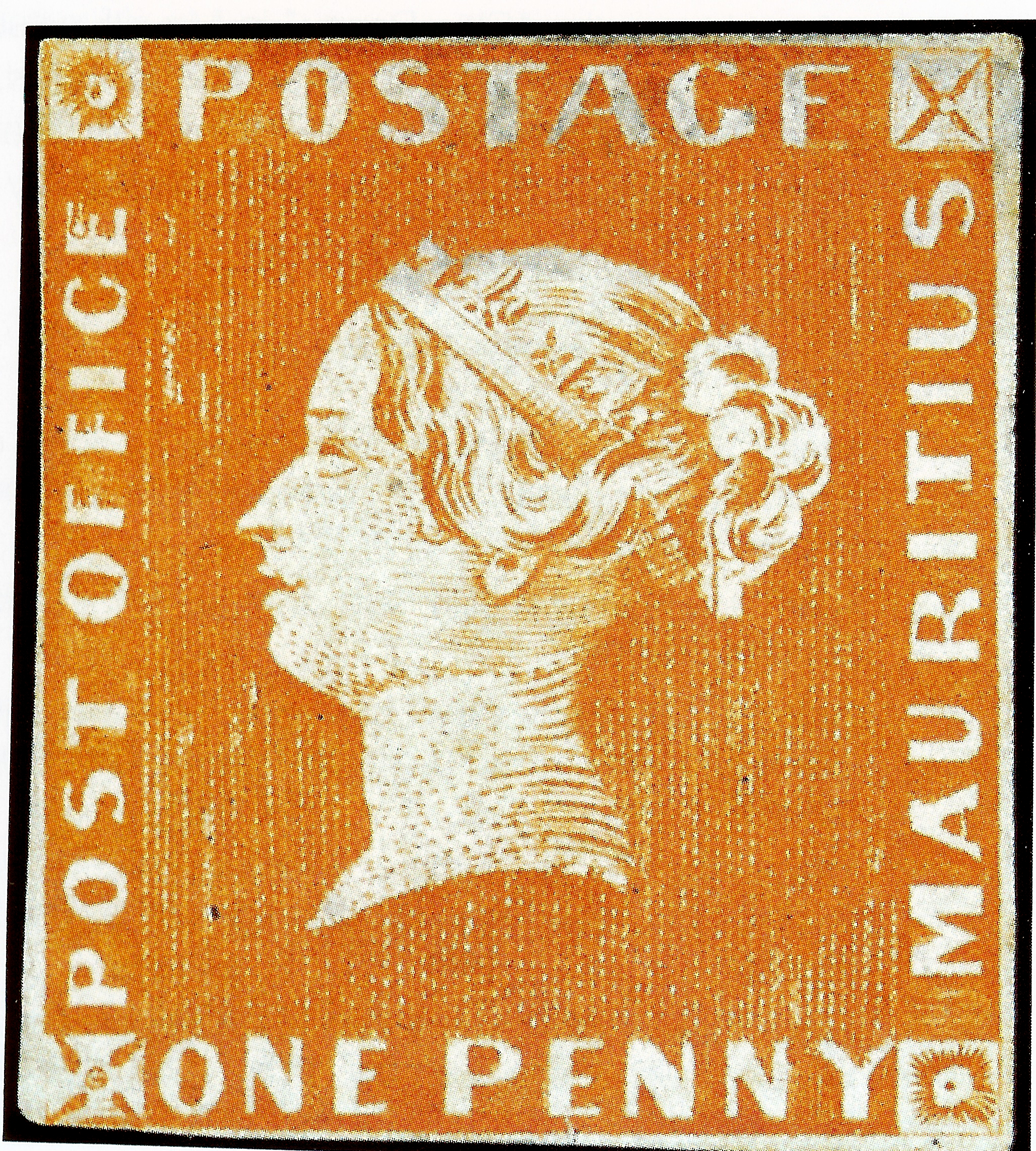
Orange Mauritius "Post Office" stamp

== Catalogues ==
Stamp catalogues are the primary tool used by serious collectors to organize their collections, and for the identification and valuation of stamps. Most stamp shops have stamp catalogues available for purchase. A few catalogues are offered online, either free or for a fee. There are hundreds of different catalogues, most specializing in particular countries or periods. Collector clubs tend to provide free catalogues to their members.

== Notable collectors ==
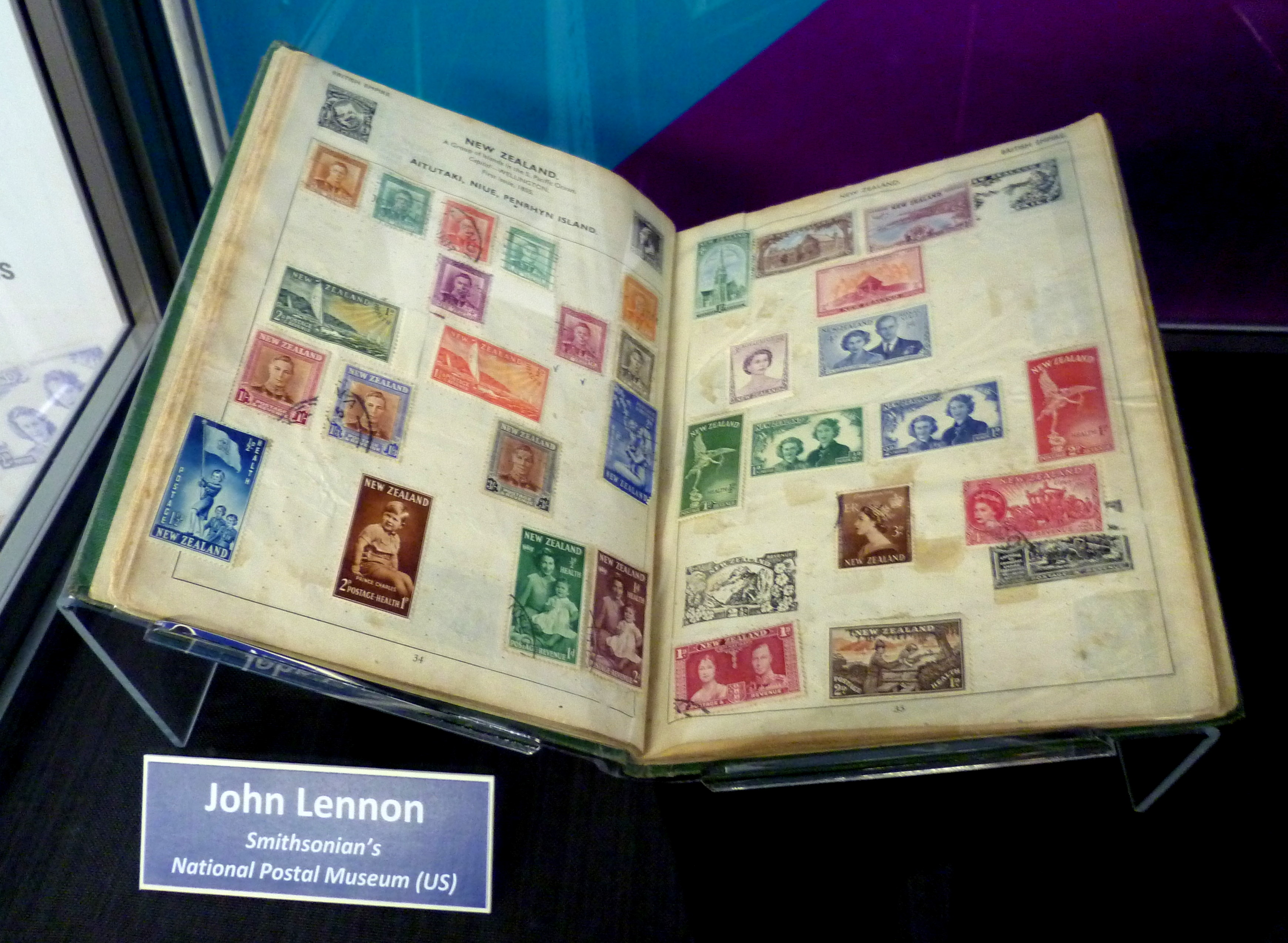
John Lennon's stamp album

The stamp collection assembled by French-Austrian aristocrat Philipp von Ferrary (1850–1917) at the beginning of the 20th century is widely considered the most complete stamp collection ever formed (or likely to be formed). It included, for example, all of the rare stamps described above that had been issued by 1917. However, as Ferrary was an Austrian citizen, the collection was broken up and sold by the French government after the First World War, as war reparations.

The Tapling Collection of postage stamps was donated to the British Museum from the estate of Thomas Tapling in 1891. It currently forms the Tapling Collection in the Philatelic Collections of the British Library.

Several European monarchs were keen stamp collectors, including King George V of the United Kingdom and King Carol II of Romania. King George V possessed one of the most valuable stamp collections in the world and became President of the Royal Philatelic Society. His collection was passed on to Queen Elizabeth II who, while not a serious philatelist, had a collection of British and Commonwealth first day covers which she started in 1952.

U.S. President Franklin Delano Roosevelt was a stamp collector; he designed several American commemorative stamps during his term. Late in life Ayn Rand renewed her childhood interest in stamps and became an enthusiastic collector. Several entertainment and sport personalities have been known to be collectors. Freddie Mercury, lead singer of the band Queen, collected stamps as a child. His childhood stamp album is in the collection of the British Postal Museum & Archive. John Lennon of The Beatles was a childhood stamp collector. His stamp album is held by the National Postal Museum.

Former world chess champion Anatoly Karpov has amassed a huge stamp collection over the decades, led by stamps from Belgium and Belgian Congo, that has been estimated to be worth $15 million.

Herbert Pitman, best known for being third officer and survivor of RMS Titanic, was an avid, life-long stamp collector. He brought his collection aboard Titanic with him; it was subsequently lost in the sinking.

== Stamp societies ==
- American Philatelic Society
- Baltimore Philatelic Society
- Chicago Philatelic Society
- Hawaiian Philatelic Society
- New Haven Philatelic Society
- Polonus Philatelic Society
- Sacramento Philatelic Society
- U.S. Philatelic Classics Society

== See also ==
- The WikiBooks Worldwide Stamp Catalogue
- US stamp locator

== Sources ==
- Cabeen, Richard McP. (1979). Standard Handbook of Stamp Collecting. Chicago: Collectors Club of Chicago. ISBN 0-690-01773-1.
- Nankivell, Edward J. (2007). Stamp Collecting as a Pastime: Stanley Gibbons Philatelic Handbooks (1902). UK: Dodo Press. ISBN 978-1-4065-3058-2. Free download here.
