= Sacramento Philatelic Society =

- Founded: 1914
- Founder: Arthur W. Spanton
- Type: not-for-profit organization
- Purpose: stamp collecting / philately
- Location: Sacramento, California
- Origins: Sacramento Stamp Society
- Region served: the Sacramento Valley
- Method: meetings, stamp shows, newsletter, sales circuit, silent bid sales, & philatelic library
- Members: 250
- Key people: president: Ernie Teays
- Subsidiaries: chapter of the American Philatelic Society
- Revenue: membership dues
- Website: Sacramento Philatelic Society

The Sacramento Philatelic Society is an organization serving stamp collectors in the Sacramento area of California.

== History ==
The club was founded in 1914 by Mr. A. W. Spanton, who posted an advertisement in the newspaper and received responses from twelve philatelists who then formed the club, which they called the Sacramento Stamp Society. The early club meetings were held at the YMCA. Later on, meetings were held at churches, schools, and any location they could find. The club grew quickly, and in 1961 the Sacramento Stamp Society became incorporated as the Sacramento Philatelic Society, Inc.

The society publishes a bi-monthly newsletter, entitled The Philatelic Prospector.

== Location ==
As of May 8, 2024, meetings are held at the Northminster Presbyterian Church, in Sacramento 95821, every Wednesday evening.

Meetings consist of club business, presentations, socialization, a sales circuit which is made available for attendees to shop at, and boxes of loose stamps which are made available for attendees to search through.

== Collection ==
The Philatelic Society has approximately 1 million stamps, organized into 36 bins that they store as a group.

== SACAPEX ==
The philatelic exhibition SACAPEX (Sacramento California Philatelic Exhibition) is sponsored by the society and is held annually.

== Organization ==
The society operates by its set of by-laws. Elected officers are the president, vice president, treasurer, secretary, and members of the board of directors.

== See also ==
- Stamp collecting
