= Postage stamps and postal history of Cuba =

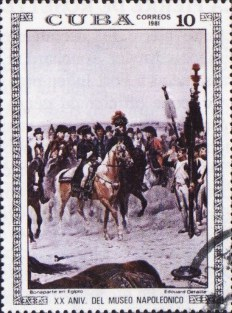
A 1981 stamp marking the 20th anniversary of the Napoleon Museum in Havana

This is a survey of the postage stamps and postal history of Cuba.

Cuba is an island country in the Caribbean Sea. The nation of Cuba consists of the main island of Cuba, the Isla de la Juventud, and several archipelagos. Havana is the largest city in Cuba and the country's capital.

== First stamps and postal stationery ==
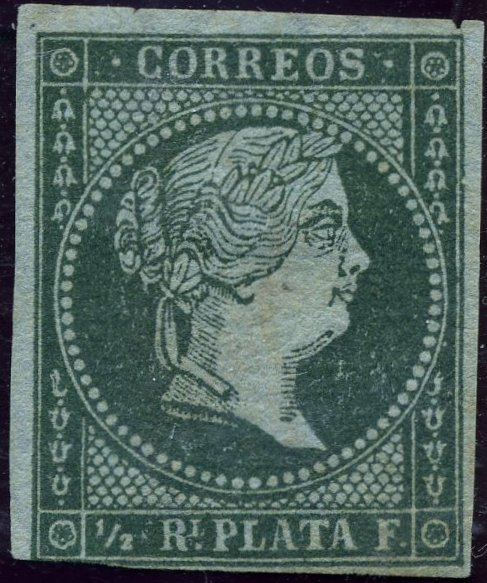
An 1855 stamp depicting the portrait of Isabel II

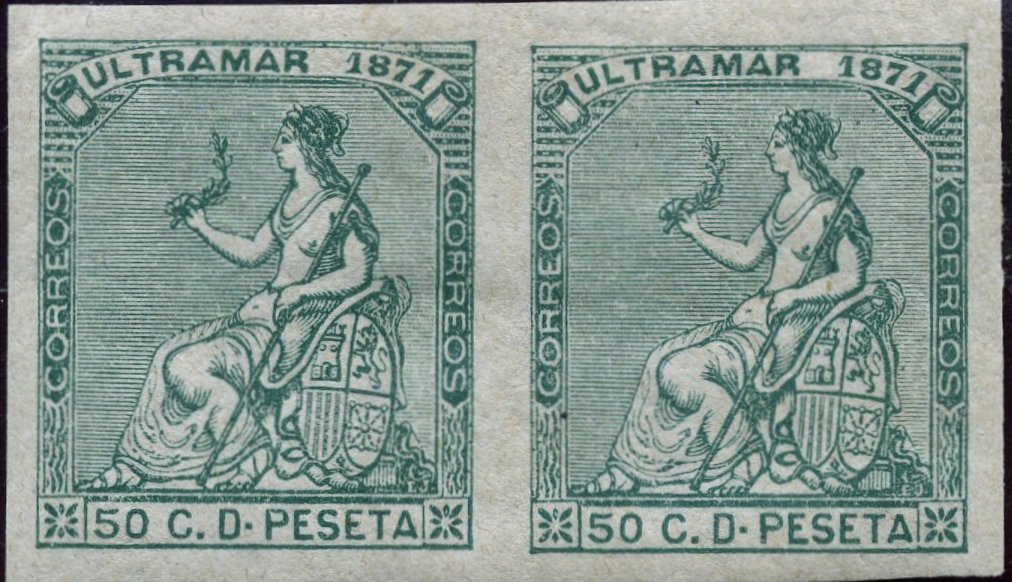
Cuban allegory stamps of 1871 produced after the abdication of Isabel II. The denomination is 25 céntimos de peseta, a new valuation that lasted until 1881 when centavos de peso was finally established.

The first stamps of Cuba were issues for the Spanish West Indies, for use in both Cuba and Puerto Rico, issued in April 1855. These stamps are referred to as the "Antilles". At first, Isabella II had her portrait on all regular issues until her abdication in 1868.

Cuba had separate stamps from 1873. Postage stamps continued to be labeled only "ULTRAMAR" (overseas) until the word CUBA appeared for the first time in 1877. The portrait of Alfonso XII adorned the stamps from 1876 until 1890, some three years after his posthumously born successor, Alfonso XIII, assumed the throne under Regency status, and had his portrait instead. This depicted a baby whose hairline was considerably receded and thus earned the irreverent nickname of el pelón (baldie). Finally, in 1898, a youth with tousled hair appears.

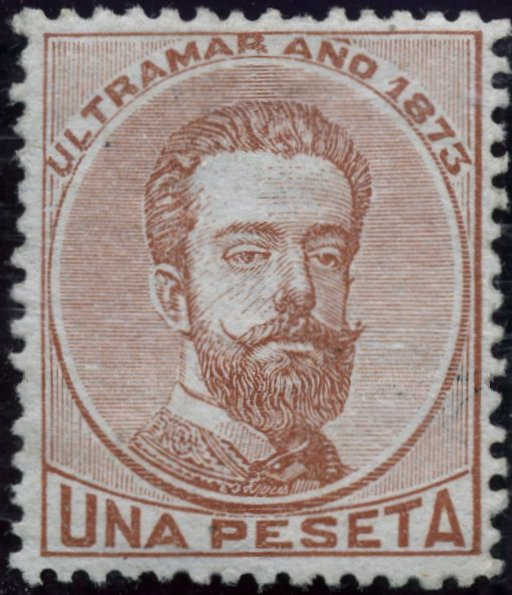
An 1873 stamp depicting King Amadeo I

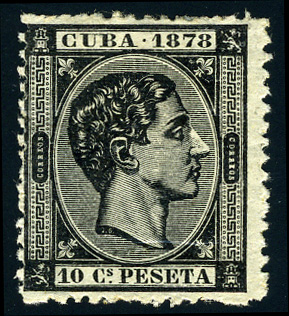
An 1878 stamp depicting King Alfonso XII

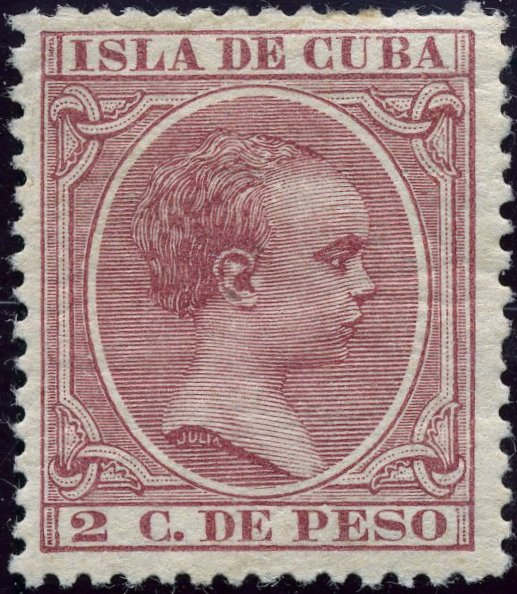
An 1891 stamp depicting King Alfonso XIII as a baby

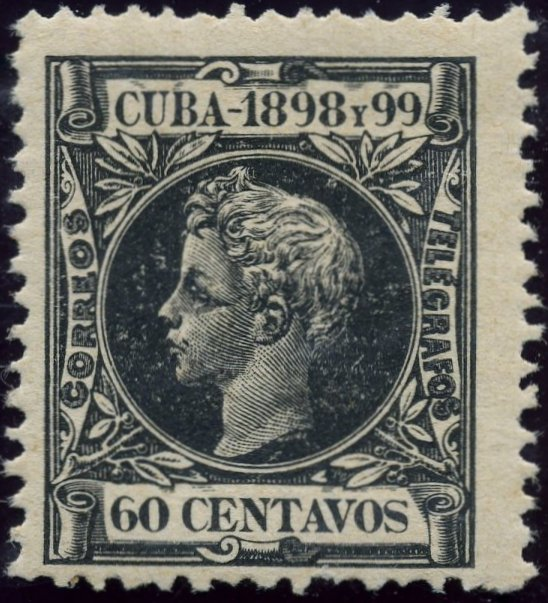
An 1898 stamp depicting King Alfonso XIII

Postal cards for Cuba were printed in Spain and sent to their colonies in 1878. With the war of independence for Cuba, the United States intervened from 1898 to 1902. At that time, stamped envelopes and newspaper wrappers became available to the residents of Cuba.

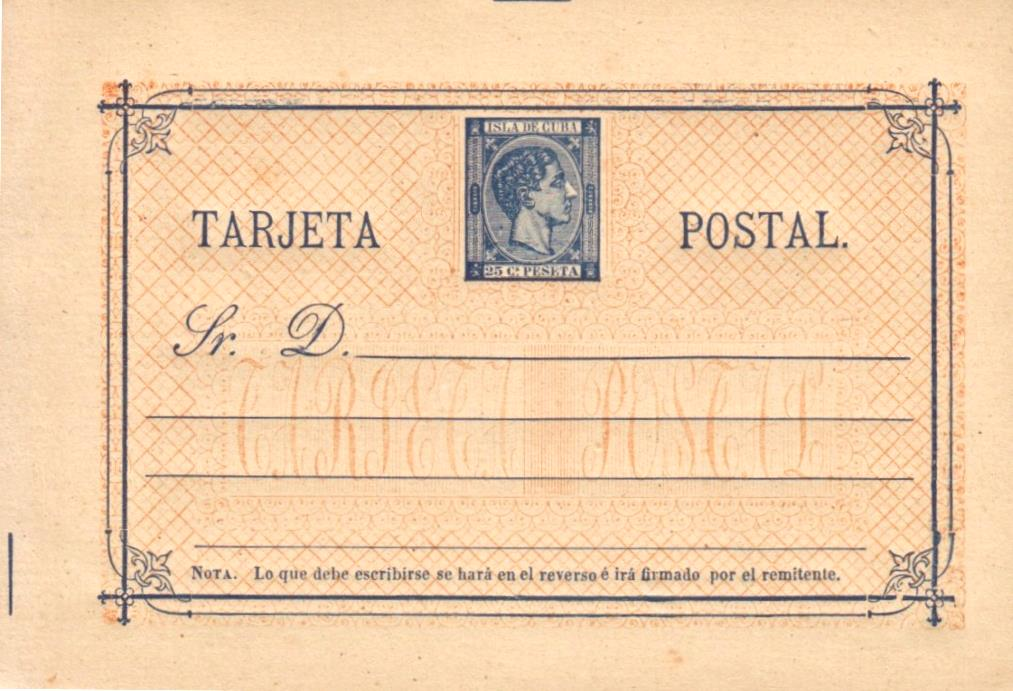
The first Cuban postal card of 1878 bearing the portrait of King Alfonso XII.

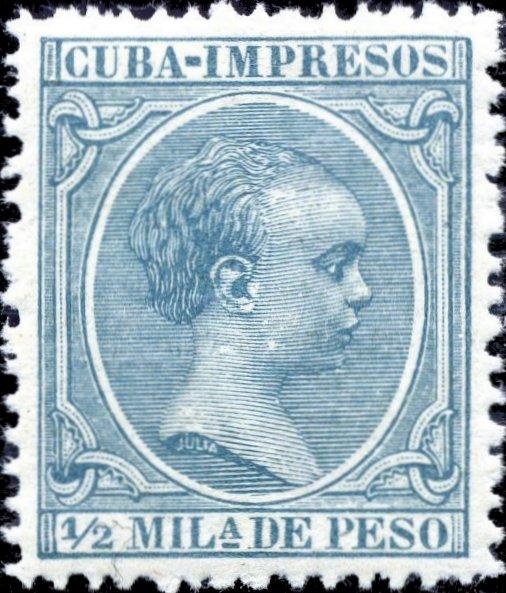
Cuban newspaper stamps of 1896 with el pelón portrait of Alfonso XIII

== U.S. intervention ==
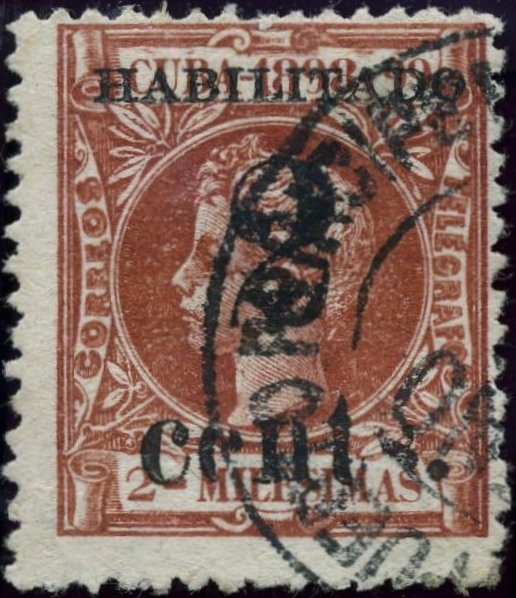
The 1898 provisional "Puerto Príncipe" overprint

The United States intervened in Cuba in 1898. One of the interesting and rare series of stamps occurred as a result. This was the provisional issues known as "Puerto Príncipe" (now Camagüey) named after the town where they were printed. The supplies of stamps in the town included stamps imprinted with the likeness of Alfonso XIII of Spain, but the United States in December, 1898, was now in control. A peace protocol had been entered into between U.S. and Spain on August 12, 1898, and the Treaty of Paris of December 10, 1898, ceded control to the United States. On December 19, 1898, the U.S. supplied stamps were still a month away from delivery. The local authorities solved that problem by obtaining permission from the provisional U.S. military government to contract a local printer to surcharge existing supplies of Spanish Cuban stamps with a surcharge of initially four different denominations. Eventually a total of five different printings were made that resulted in a total of five different denominations. These surcharged issues are scarce. As a result, forgeries are numerous. A Puerto Príncipe stamp should be authenticated to have maximum value to a collector. By using vertical verification lines, one can get a good idea of whether on not a surcharge is original or forged.

In December 1898, Major Estes Rathbone was appointed Director General of Posts for Cuba and on January 1, 1899, the U.S. established a Cuban Civilian Postal Administration. The new Postal Administration was to operate using the same post offices that existed during the Spanish Administration, but using its new postage stamps and canceling devices. Since January 1 was a Sunday, the recently received U.S. Stamps overprinted for use in Cuba did not go on sale in Havana until Monday, January 2. Outlying areas received the overprinted stamps later.

The provisional stamp overprints on U.S. stamps initially consisted of a 1 centavo on a 1¢ Franklin, 2½c on a 2¢ Washington, 3c on a 3¢ Jackson, 5c on a 5¢ Grant, 10c on a 10¢ Webster and a 10c overprint on a U.S. special delivery stamp. It turned out that the 2½¢ stamp was in error as the postage rates had recently changed. They continued to use the 2½¢ stamps anyway and sold them for and valued them at 2¢ so as not to waste the large printing. Later a 2¢ overprint appeared.

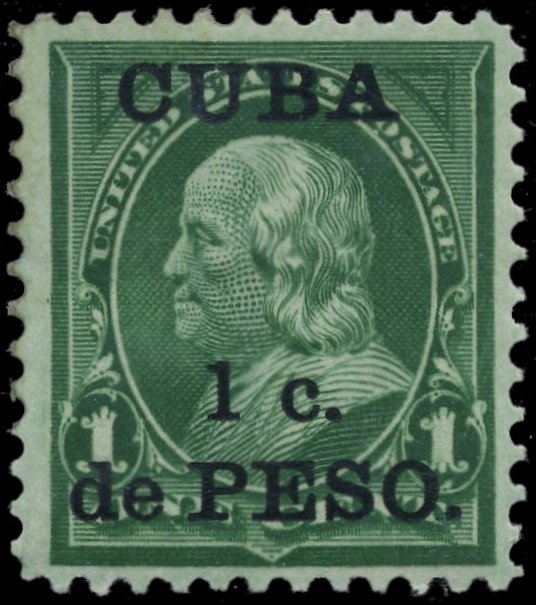
Provisional overprint for Cuba, 1899

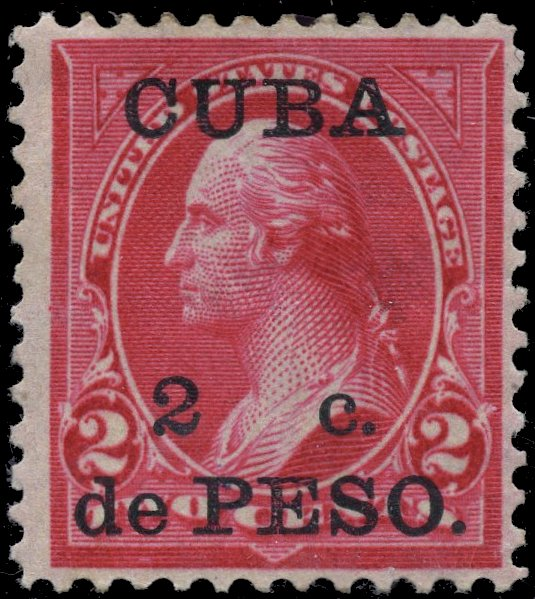
Provisional overprint for Cuba, 1899

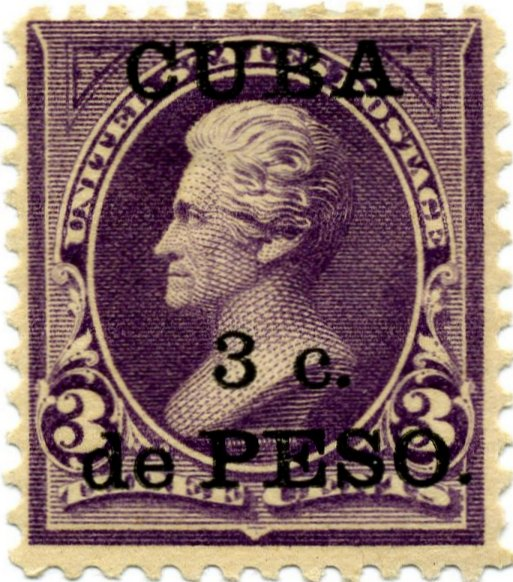
Provisional overprint for Cuba, 1899

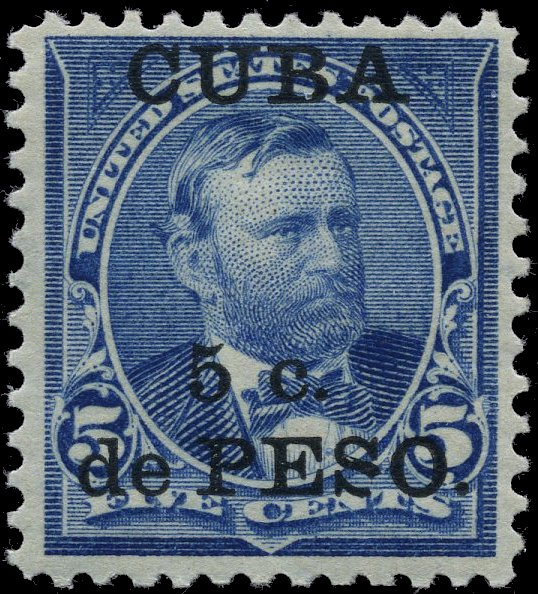
Provisional overprint for Cuba, 1899

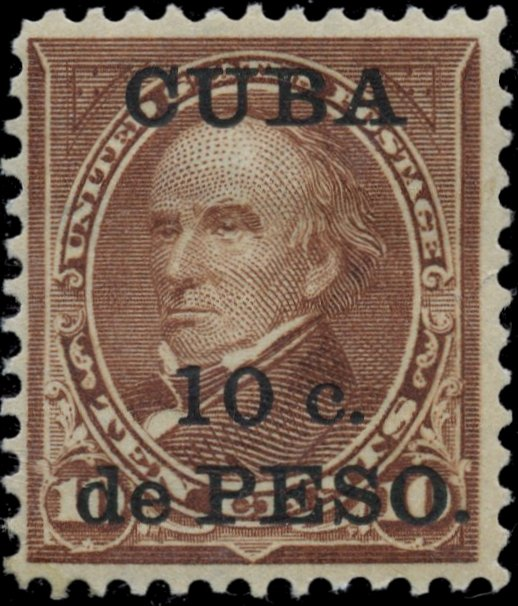
Provisional overprint for Cuba, 1899

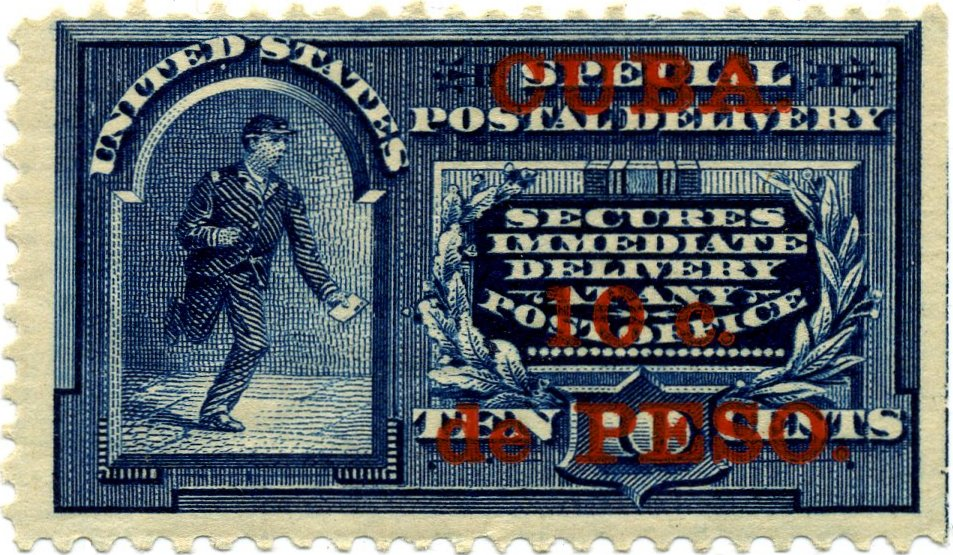
Provisional special delivery overprint for Cuba, 1899

Later in 1899, the United States printed a series of six stamps for Cuba. They are known as the "Alegorías Cubana" or Cuban allegory stamps. Regular postage rates of 1¢, 2¢, 3¢, 5¢ and 10¢ and a special delivery 10¢ bicycle stamp comprised this series.

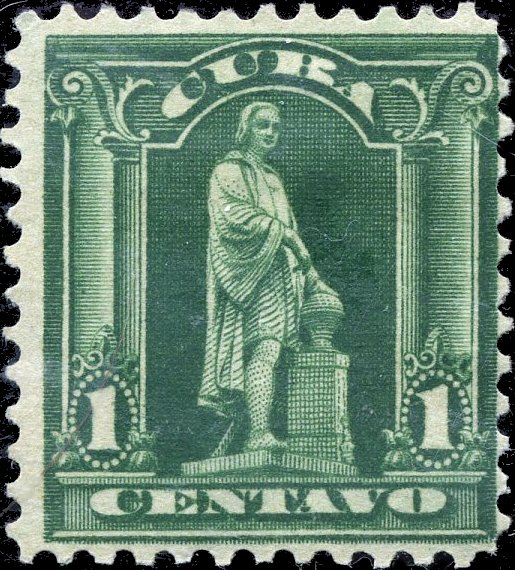
An 1899 stamp depicting Columbus

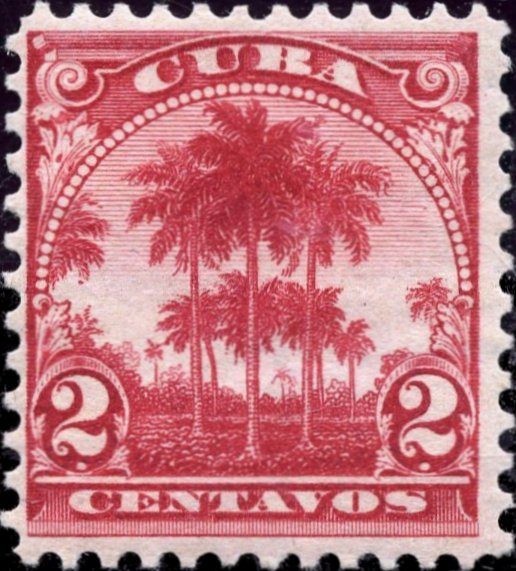
An 1899 stamp depicting the Cuban royal palms

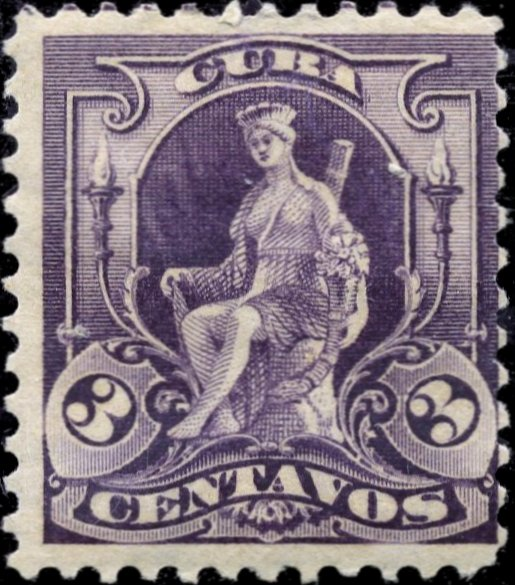
An 1899 stamp depicting the personification of Cuba

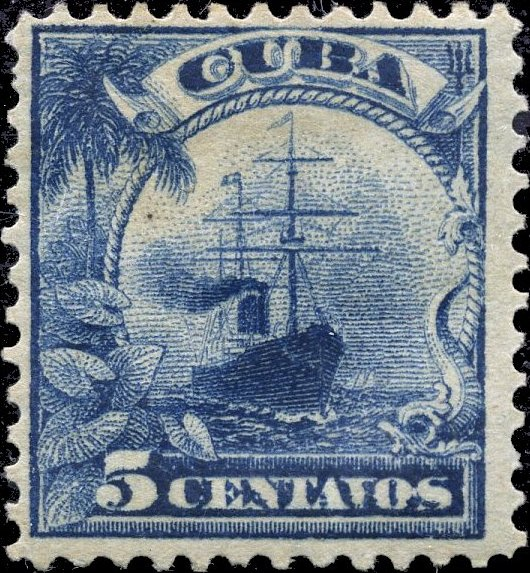
An 1899 stamp featuring a steamship

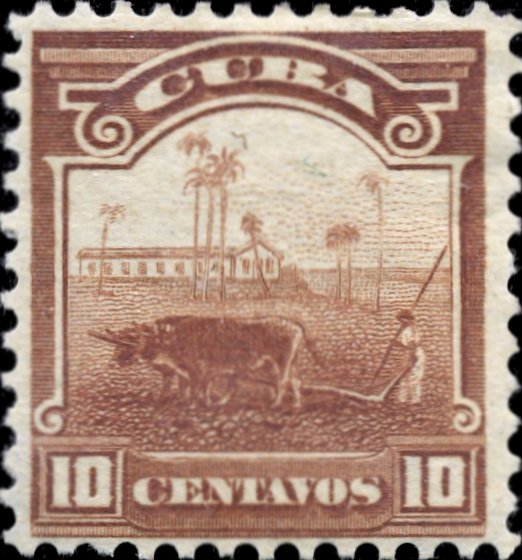
An 1899 stamp featuring a field plowed by oxen

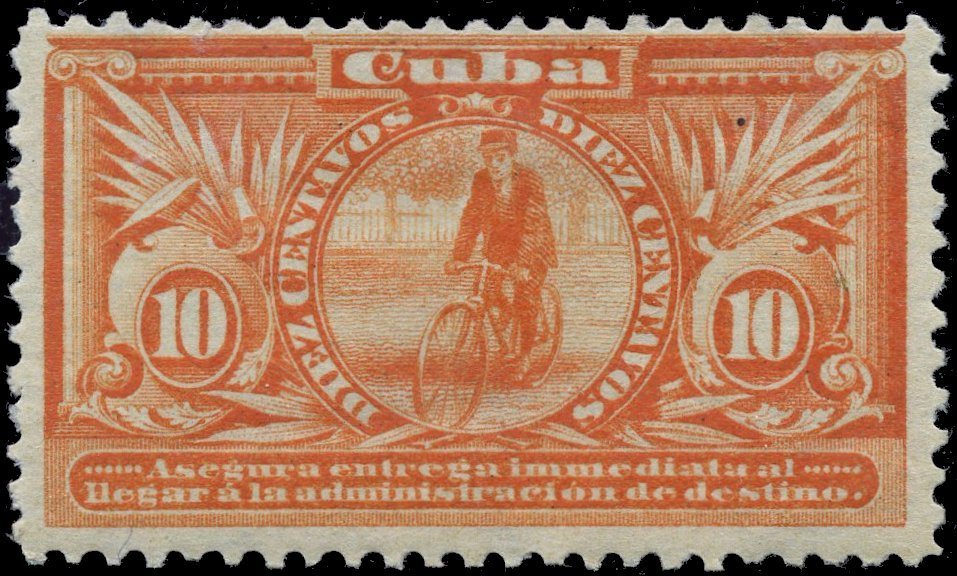
An 1899 special delivery stamp featuring a messenger on bicycle

As with the adhesive stamps, the first provisional stamped envelopes were also overprints on U.S. stock. There were eight different U.S. envelopes that were overprinted "CUBA." and "1c. (or 2c.) DE PESO.". By the late summer of 1899, the U.S. had furnished Cuba with its own Columbus design to replace the overprints. Likewise the first (and only) postal cards of the U.S. administration were a 1¢ U.S. Jefferson card overprinted with "CUBA.-1c. de Peso." and a 2¢ U.S. Liberty card overprinted with "CUBA.-2c. de Peso.".

U.S. rule of Cuba ended on May 20, 1902, when Cuba became an independent Republic.

== Cuban Republic stamps ==
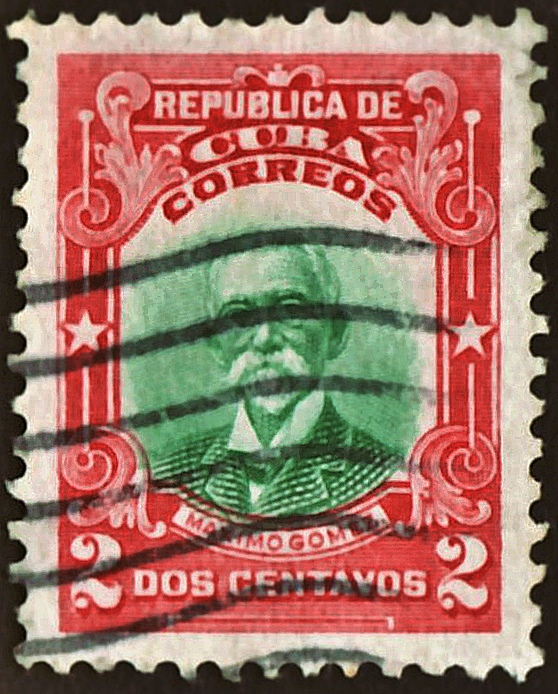
A 1910 stamp of Cuba

The Cuban government of the República de Cuba issued stamps from its inception in 1902 until Fidel Castro assumed control on January 1, 1959. The first issue was on September 30, 1902. There were no stamps yet printed by Cuba, but they had many of the little used 3¢ allegory stamps of 1899. They choose to overprint these stamps to meet the 1¢ postal rate demand by overprinting a large numeral "1" on each stamp with the legend "UN CENTAVO" "HABILITADO" and "OCTUBRE 1902". Cubans continued to use the allegory stamps of 1899. In 1905, four of the five regular rate allegory stamps were reprinted for Cuba in the United States, but this time the printer made minute changes in each of the stamps before the reprint so as to make them distinguishable.

The last stamps of the Republic before the revolution were the Christmas 2¢ and 4¢ issues of December 16, 1958. Judging by the Scott catalog numbers, the Republic had issued 380 different regular postage stamps, 194 airmail, 27 special delivery, 34 postal tax, and 10 postage due stamps.

== Socialist era ==
With the coming of the Cuban Revolution, the stamps of Cuba proliferated in number. Topical stamps abound, as do postal cards. About thirty aerograms have been produced. The postal stationery Mother's Day cards number have been produced in numbers of 20 or more per year and now number in the hundreds.
