= Bicycles on postal items =

Bicycle stamps on postal stationery and other postal items

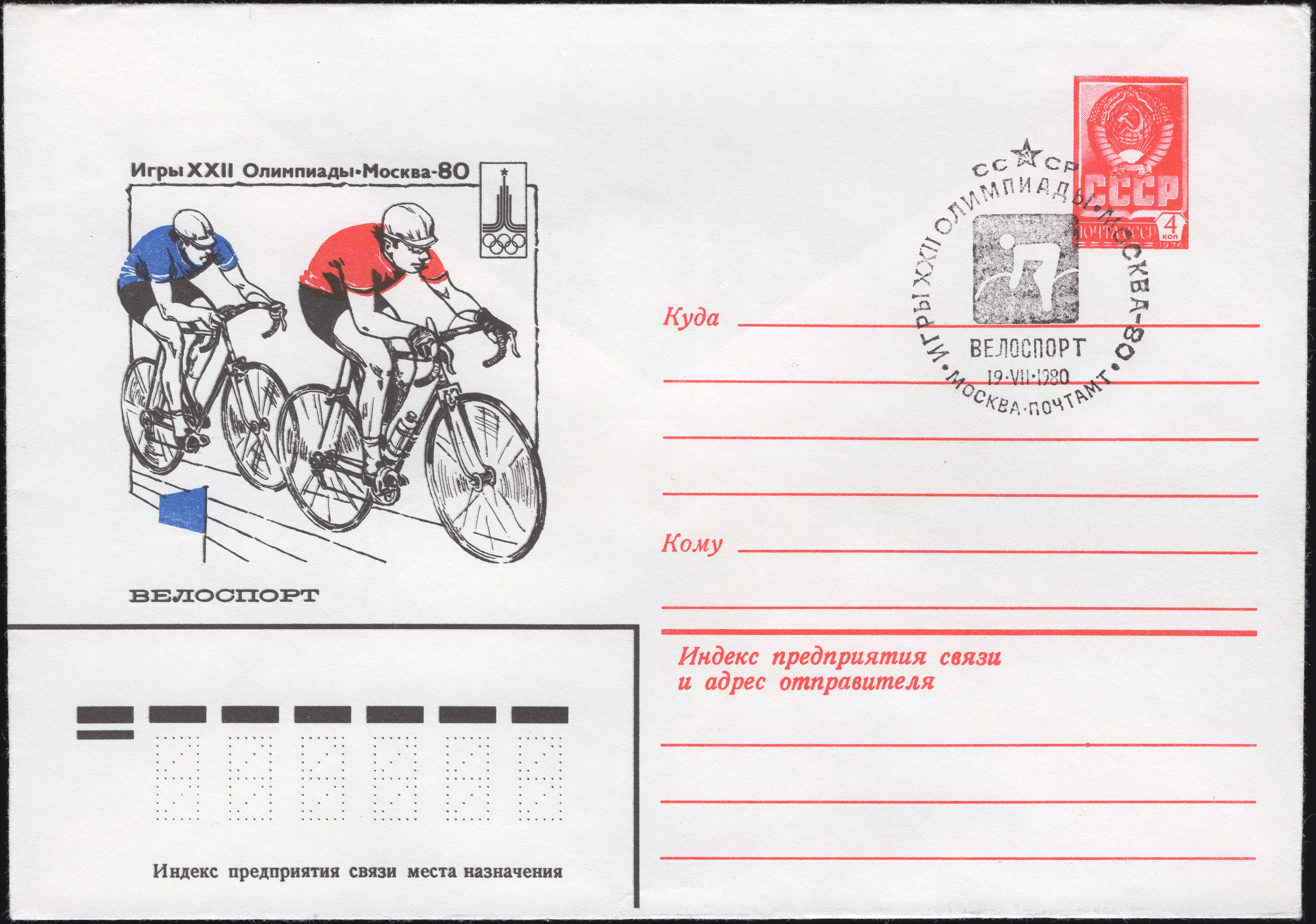
Soviet Union 1979 illustrated stamped envelope promoting the 1980 Moscow Olympics with cyclist cancellation

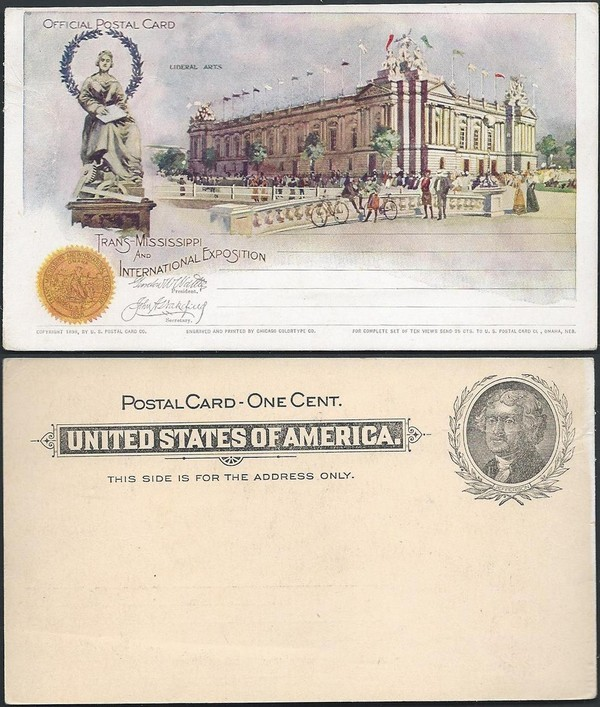
USA 1898 1¢ postal card for the Trans-Mississippi and International Exposition depicting two bicycles on a bridge

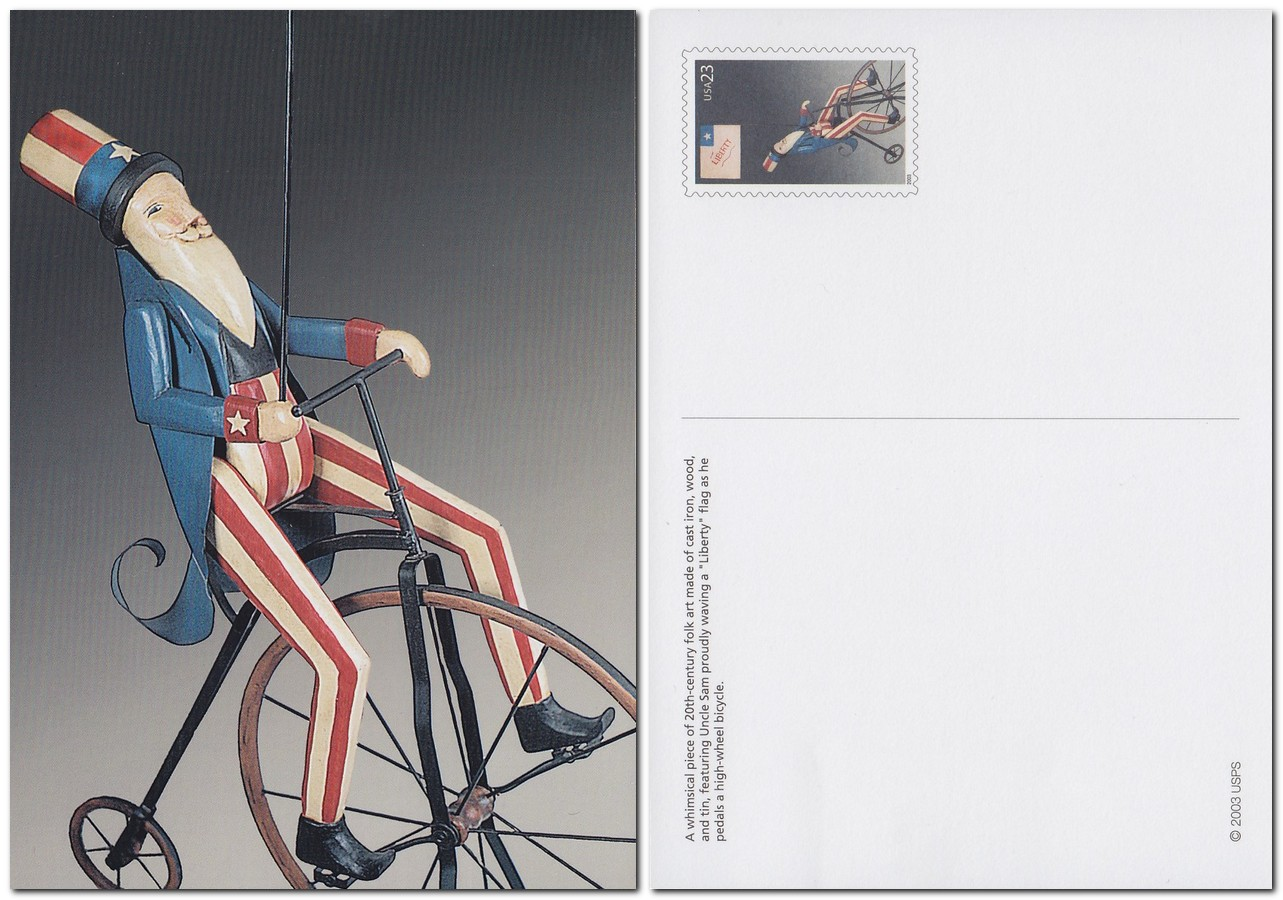
USA 2003 bicycle stamp maximum card

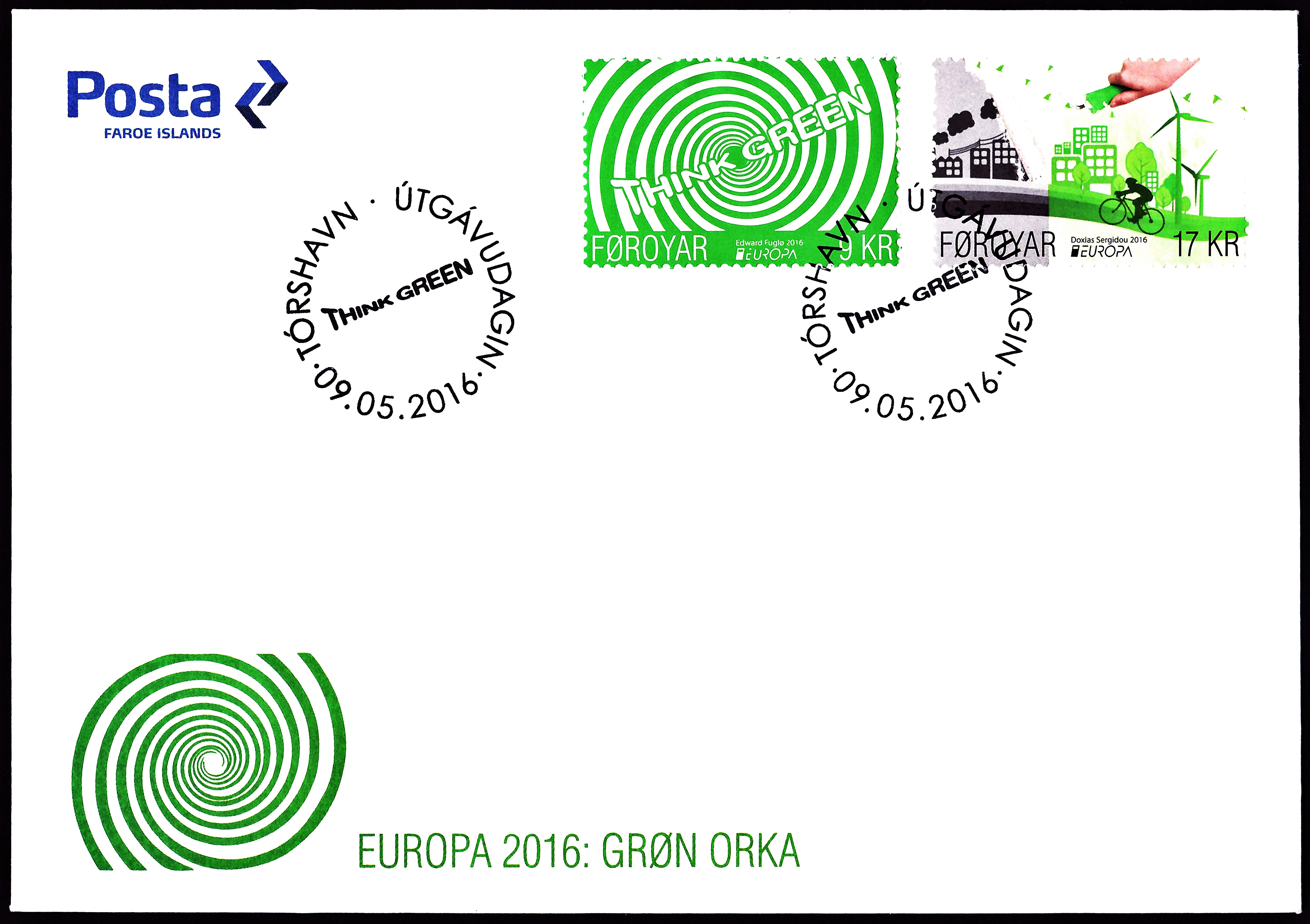
Faroes 2016 first day cover with Think Green bicycle stamp

Bicycles on postal items includes bicycles on postal stationery and other postal items depicting bicycles such as postcards, first day covers and items delivered by bicycle mail. The collection of bicycles on postal items is commonly associated with collecting bicycles on stamps, or collecting the stamps and postal stationery of a specific country.

== Definition ==
The definition of exactly what constitutes bicycles on postal items is open to debate. As the subject is extensive, each collector individually determines their own rules for what should be included in their collection.

Bicycles on postal items fall into one of the following categories:

- A piece of postal stationery depicting a bicycle. The official definition is: "Postal stationery comprises postal matter which either bears an officially authorized pre-printed stamp or device or inscription indicating that a specific rate of postage or related service has been prepaid".
  - A stamped envelope
  - A registered envelope
  - A letter sheet
  - A postal card (a card with an imprinted stamp or indicium signifying the prepayment of postage)
  - A lettercard
  - An aerogram
  - A wrapper
- A postal item which is not defined as postal stationery:
  - A maximum card, that is a postcard depicting a bicycle with an affixed bicycle stamp
  - A postcard depicting a bicycle with a non-bicycle stamp
  - A first day cover depicting a bicycle in the design and/or on the stamp

The following types of material are excluded (although they may also be collected by enthusiasts):

- A bicycle stamp in isolation, that is without an accompanying postal item.
- A postal item with Cinderella, local, private or personal issues, i.e. unofficial stamps.
- Items with non-postal stamps, e.g. revenue stamps
- Postal items issued by non-existing/unrecognized countries and/or in excess of actual postal requirements.

== Design ==
In all these cases the design includes one or more of the following elements:

- It depicts a human-powered cycling machine. This includes a whole (or part of) bicycles, tricycles, unicycles, toy cycles, tandems, rickshaws, exercise/standing bicycles, etc. It excludes powered or unpowered wheelchairs and motor-driven or motor-assisted cycling machines, e.g. motorcycles, mopeds. (Note: Some collectors believe that the existence of human-powered parts, such as pedals and a bicycle chain, in the pictured bicycle should make the image acceptable, even if the machine is power-assisted.)
- It depicts a bicycle or cyclist in a social context. For example, a cyclist in a street scene, cycling as an energy-efficient, green, mode of transport, or cycling promoting road safety.
- It depicts a building used specifically for cycling sport, i.e. a velodrome.
- It depicts a person notable for being a cyclist, e.g. a winner of the Tour de France, or cycling events at the Olympic Games.
- It depicts the process of manufacturing a bicycle, or a notable bicycle manufacturer (individual or firm).
- It depicts the word "bicycle" in the local language, even if the image of a bicycle is not included. The word triathlon without an image of a bicycle is excluded.

== Depiction of bicycles on postal items ==
Subjects depicted on bicycle postal items include:

- Cycle sports
  - Indoor
    - Cycle racing
    - Velodromes
  - Outdoor
    - Event racing, e.g. cycling to raise money for charities
    - Tour racing, e.g. the Giro d'Italia
- Non-sports uses
  - The history of the bicycle
  - Bicycle industrial manufacturing
  - Bicycle mail transportation and postal delivery
  - Bicycles for commercial delivery
  - People transportation e.g. by rickshaw
  - Bicycle military use
  - Bicycles as toys
  - Bicycle tourism
  - Bicycles in street scenes
  - Bicycles to symbolize alternative, energy-efficient transport
  - Bicycles depicting or encouraging road traffic safety
