= Bird stamp =

Ornithological philately

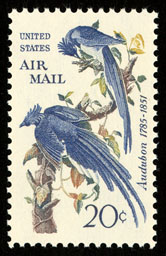
Since the advent of crewed flight, postal services have used birds as a common illustration for air mail stamps.

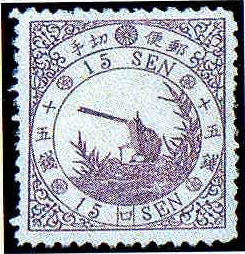
1875 stamp of Japan featuring illustration of a wagtail.

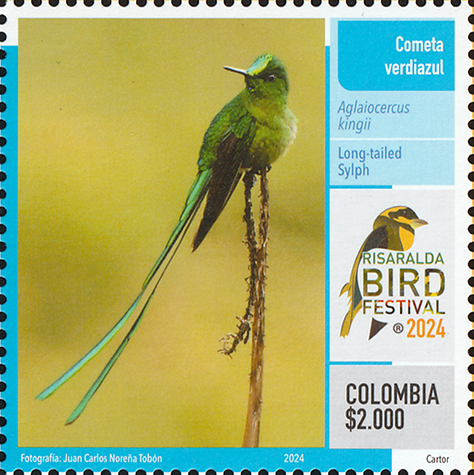
2024 Colombia stamp depicting the Long-tailed Sylph.

A bird stamp is a postage stamp that illustrates one or more birds. It is a popular theme in topical stamp collecting.

Birds started appearing on stamps by 1875, when Japan issued a series of three stamps bearing stylized illustrations of the three species Motacilla alba, Accipiter gentilis and bean goose. The first United States bird stamp, depicting an eagle with wings outspread, was issued in 1869 on Scott #116 and #121, on stamps that were issued for general mail usage. The UK issued its first in honor of "Nature Week" in 1963. As of 2024, over 40,000 bird stamps have been issued around the world, depicting more than 4,000 species of birds.

A prominent collector is Chris Gibbins whose collection of over twelve thousand stamps portrays about three thousand species. Organisations that cover this field include the American Topical Association and The Bird Stamp Society.

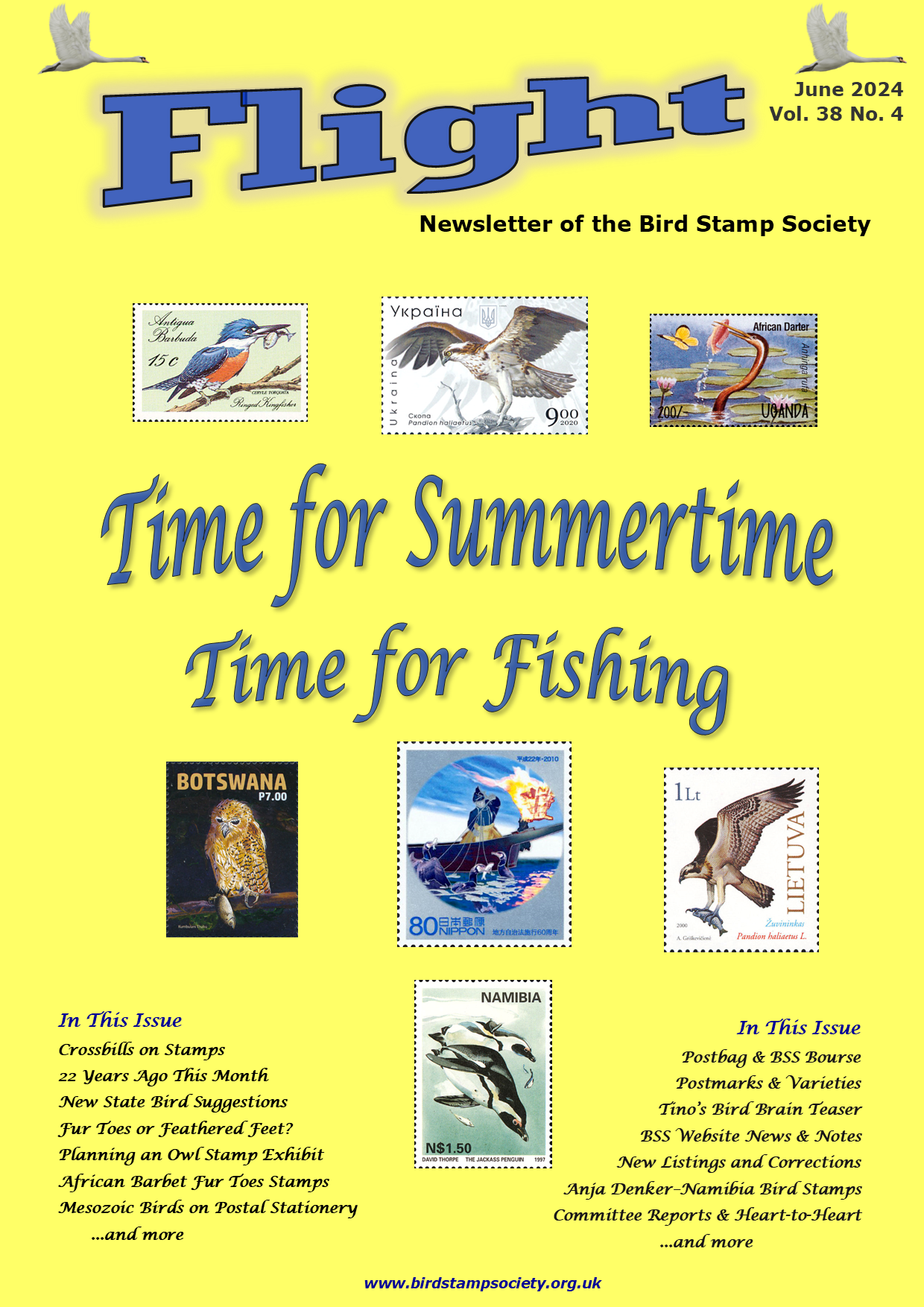
The Bird Stamp Society publishes Flight four times a year.

== References and sources ==
Notes

Sources

- Bleeker, Sonia (1966), The Golden Book of Bird Stamps
- Daly, Kathleen (1955), Bird Stamps
- Eriksen, Hanne; Eriksen, Jens (1996), Collect Birds on Stamps, Stanley Gibbons, ISBN 9780852594087
- Esten, Sidney (1954), Birds of the World on Stamps, American Topical Association
- Bird Stamps of All Countries with a Natural History of Each Bird, Grosset & Dunlap, 1935
- The World of Birds on Stamps, Hayes, 1975
- Jackson, Christine (1978), Collecting Bird Stamps, ISBN 0854931260
- Koeppel, Dan (2006), To See Every Bird on Earth: A Father, a Son, and a Lifelong Obsession, Penguin, ISBN 9781440627033
- Lant, Hugh (1975), Bird Stamps of the World Check-List, ISBN 0950476803
- Collect Birds on Stamps, Stanley Gibbons, 2002, ISBN 9780852595329
- BIRDS ON STAMPS
