= George Kauffman =

American chemist (1930–2020)

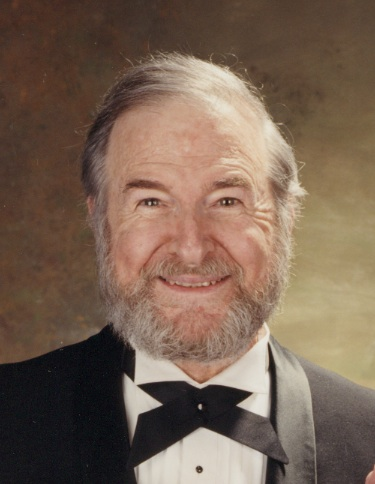
- Born: George Bernard Kauffman; September 4, 1930; Philadelphia, Pennsylvania, U.S.
- Died: May 2, 2020 (aged 89); Fresno, California, U.S.
- Education: University of Florida; University of Pennsylvania
- Awards: Guggenheim Fellow; Dexter Award
- Scientific career
- Fields: Chemistry
- Workplaces: California State University, Fresno

George Bernard Kauffman (September 4, 1930 – May 2, 2020) was an American chemist.

== Life ==
Kauffman was born in Philadelphia, the son of Laura (Fisher) and Joseph Philip Kauffman. He received his bachelor's degree from the University of Pennsylvania, and Ph.D. from the University of Florida. Kauffman was a professor of chemistry at California State University, Fresno. He wrote 17 books and over 2,000 articles.

In 1978, George B. Kauffman received the Dexter Award for Outstanding Achievement in the History of Chemistry from the American Chemical Society. He was a Guggenheim Fellow.

Kauffman wrote a series of articles with Foil A. Miller about chemistry on stamps.

Kauffman died on May 2, 2020, at his home in Fresno, California at the age of 89.
