= Provisional stamp =

Stamp issued until permanent supplies are available

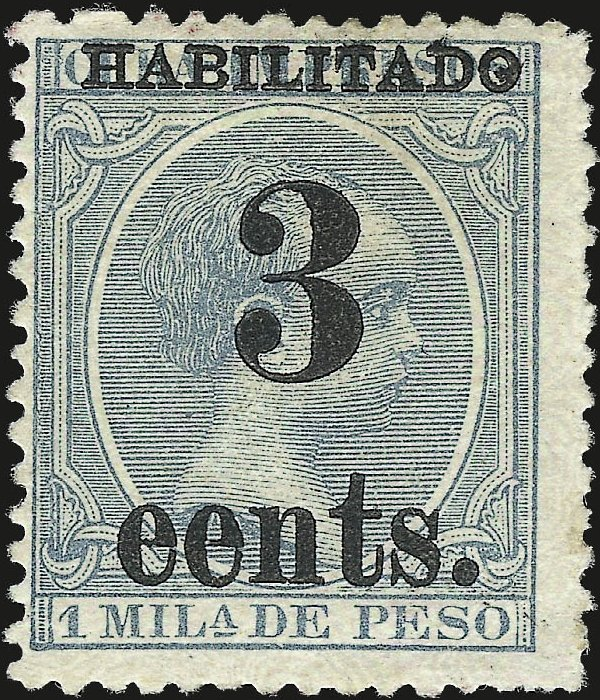
1899 Cuban provisional stamp printed in the town of Puerto Príncipe. Note that cents is misspelled eents

Linn's World Stamp Almanac defines a provisional stamp as "a postage stamp issued for temporary use to meet postal demands until new or regular stocks of stamps can be obtained."

The issuance of provisional stamps might be occasioned by a change in name or government, by occupation of foreign territory, by a change in postal rates, by a change of currency, or by the need to provide stamps that are in short supply. An interesting example of issuing provisional stamps occurred during the Spanish–American War when supplies of stamps were low and the U.S. had occupation forces in Cuba. They are known as the "Puerto Principe" provisional stamps of 1898–1899. Over 40 different combinations of overprinted valuations and underlying Spanish Cuban stamps were produced under the auspices of the military forces over a three-week period from December 19, 1898, to January 11, 1899. These were replaced by another provisional set produced by overprinting U.S. stamps in the United States for Cuba. This second set of provisional stamps was sold for about eight months before the U.S. could print Cuban stamps. The U.S. civilian provisionals also included overprinted postal cards and stamped envelopes.

Provisional stamps are usually made by overprinting, surcharging and occasionally by bisecting pre-existing stamps.

== Postmasters' provisionals ==
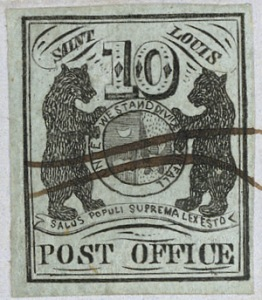
Provisional stamp issued in St. Louis, 1845

A subcategory, postmasters' provisionals, of particular importance in United States philately, comprises stamps that were issued by local postmasters in nations that had not yet begun to issue stamps for countrywide use. Between 1845, when the United States standardardized national postage rates, and 1847, when the post office issued its first stamps, postmasters' provisionals were introduced in eleven American cities, including New York, Providence, Rhode Island and St. Louis, Missouri. Many of these stamps (particularly from smaller cities such as Millbury, Massachusetts) are notable for their great rarity, or for their relative crudity of design.

Postmasters' provisionals also played a significant role in early history of the Confederate States of America. Many localities began furnishing them after U.S. mail service ceased delivering Confederate mail in June 1861; for it was only in October that Confederate stamps for nationwide use first appeared.

== See also ==
- St. Louis Bears
- United States postmasters provisional stamps
- U.S. provisional issue stamps
- Postage stamps and postal history of the Confederate States
