= Topical stamp collecting =

Collecting postage stamps relating to a particular subject

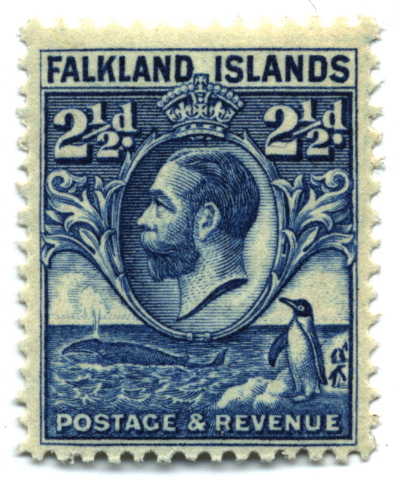
Both collectors of whales and penguins on stamps would want this 1929 issue from the Falkland Islands.

Topical or thematic stamp collecting is the collecting of postage stamps relating to a particular subject or concept. Topics can be almost anything, from stamps on stamps, birds, trains and poets on stamps, to famous physicians and scientists, along with historical people and events on stamps, which is often a standard theme for many stamp issuing countries.

== Background ==
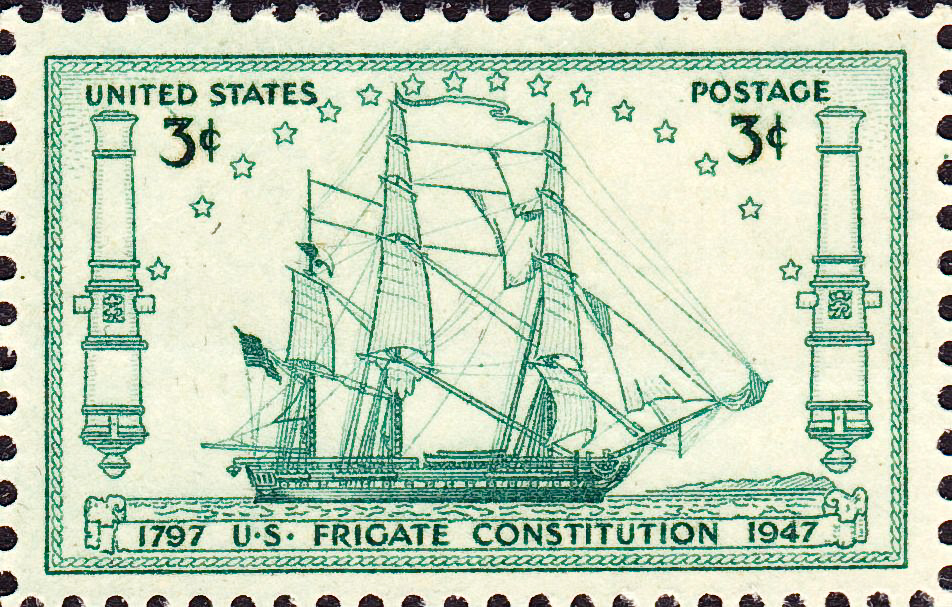
Ships on stamps: the USS Constitution.

The earliest stamps simply depicted busts of reigning monarchs, important figures, or coats of arms, but as time went on stamps started to have a wider range of designs. Bears appeared on provisional stamps of St. Louis in 1845, while the beaver was featured on the earliest stamps of Canada. More than 150 years later, the variety of designs on stamps is enormous, giving topical collectors plenty of scope to find stamps for their chosen theme. In fact, so many stamps have been issued that some popular themes, such as ships or birds, have become nearly impossible to complete, and topical collectors may specialize further, such as by looking for only square-rigged sailing ships, or only flightless birds.

== Collecting ==
Since most types of stamp designs are commonly available and inexpensive, acquiring them is mostly a matter of poring over the stamp catalog looking for relevant types, and learning enough about the topic to recognize subtle connections. The American Topical Association and others have published handbooks and lists of larger topics.

Online marketplaces and trade platforms are the most common way of collecting new stamps.

== Competitions ==
Topical collecting is a recognized category for competitive exhibitions and has its own Commission with the FIP (Fédération Internationale de Philatélie).

== Topics ==
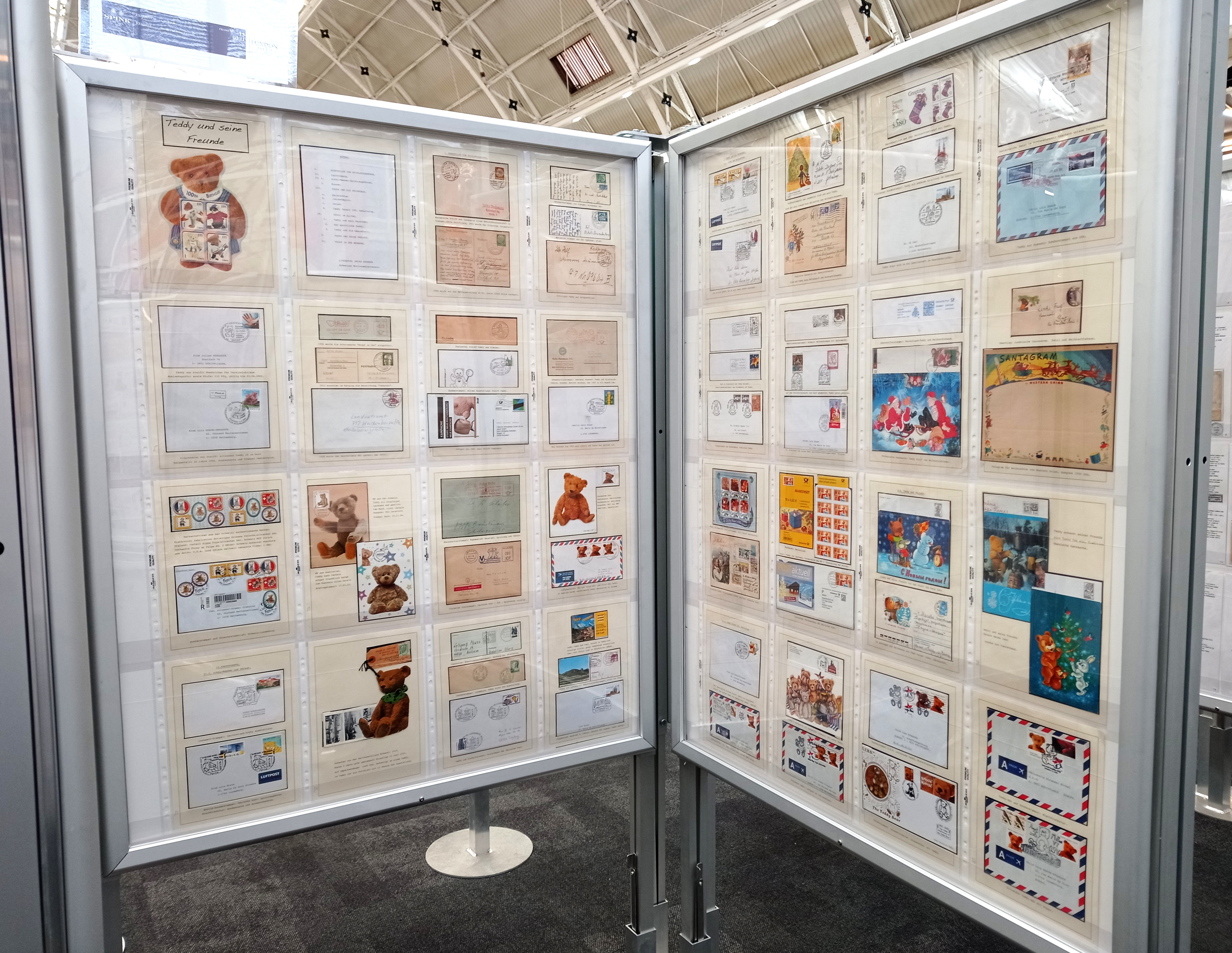
Teddy and his Friends topical stamp display at London 2022 International Stamp Exhibition

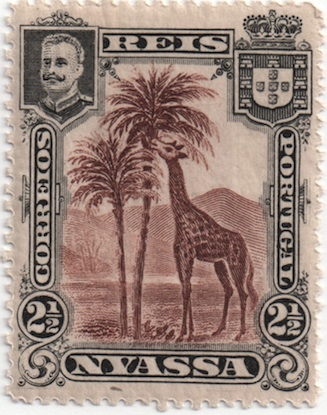
This 2 1/2 real value from the 1901 Nyassa Company stamp issue was the first stamp ever printed to feature a giraffe.

Some topics include:

- Art Deco stamps
- Bicycles on stamps
- Birds on stamps
- Chemistry on stamps
- Dinosaurs on stamps
- Fish on stamps
- Insects on stamps
- Leniniana
- Mathematics on stamps
- People on stamps
- Presidents on stamps
- Ships on stamps
- U.S. space exploration history on U.S. stamps
- Soviet space exploration history on Soviet stamps
- Stamps on stamps

Stamps with an anarchist theme were issued during the Spanish Civil War by the Confederación Nacional del Trabajo.
