= Foil A. Miller =

American chemist and philatelist

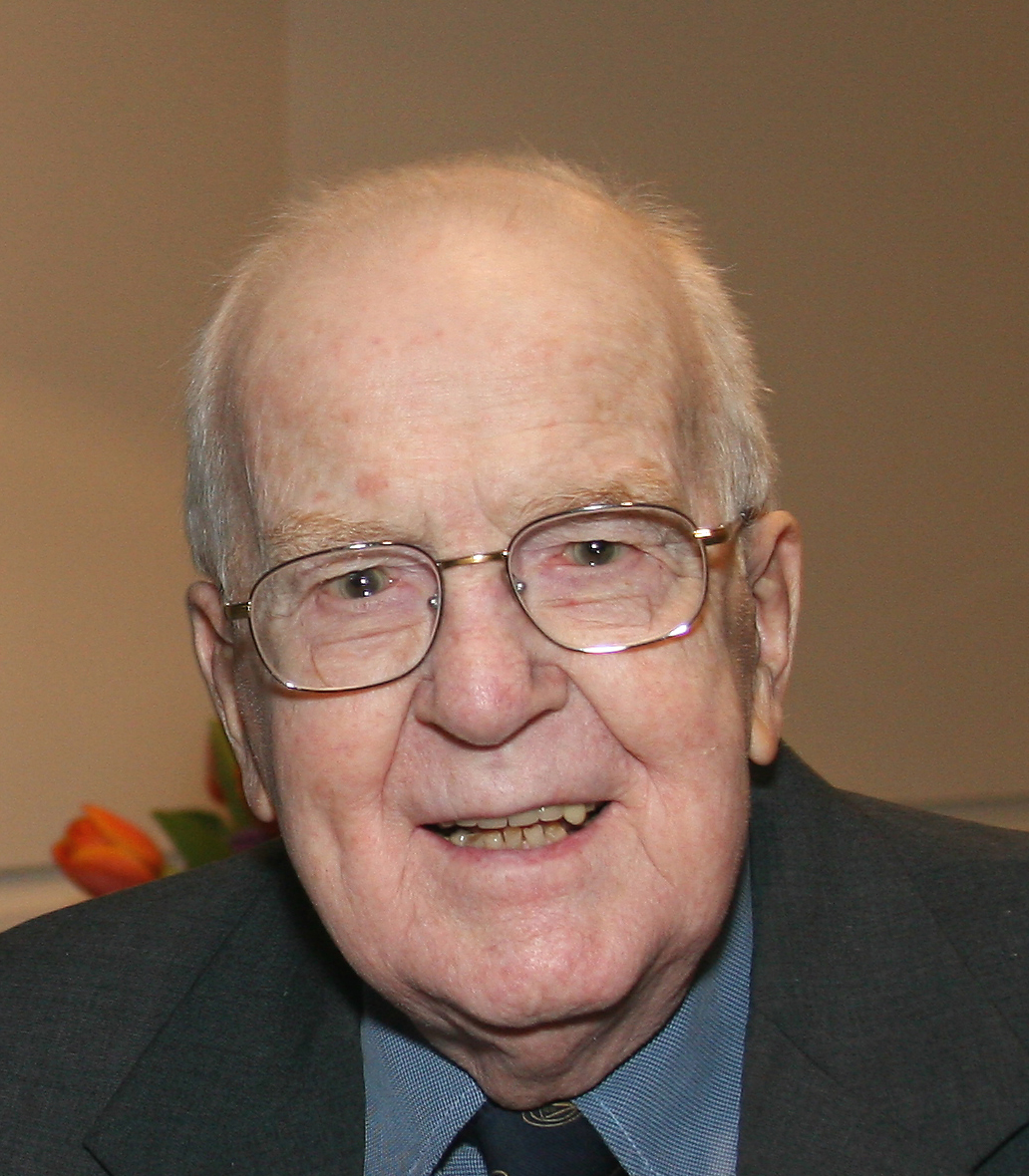
- Born: Foil Allan Miller; January 18, 1916; Aurora, Illinois
- Died: September 20, 2016 (aged 100); Glenview, Illinois
- Citizenship: American
- Education: Hamline University; Johns Hopkins University
- Scientific career
- Fields: Chemistry, Infrared and Raman spectroscopy, Philately
- Workplaces: University of Minnesota; University of Illinois; Mellon Institute; University of Pittsburgh

Foil Allan Miller (January 18, 1916 – September 20, 2016) was an American chemist and philatelist best known for his work in infrared and Raman spectroscopy. He was head of the spectroscopy division of the Mellon Institute and later professor and head of the spectroscopy laboratory at the University of Pittsburgh. Among other publications, he co-authored the books Course Notes on the Interpretation of Infrared and Raman Spectra (2004) and A Philatelic Ramble Through Chemistry (1998).

== Early life and education ==
Foil Allan Miller was born on January 18, 1916, in Aurora, Illinois. He grew up in Pepin, Wisconsin.

Miller received a B.S. in chemistry from Hamline University in St. Paul, Minnesota, in 1937. After initial graduate work at the University of Nebraska, Miller entered Johns Hopkins University in Baltimore, Maryland. He worked with Richard C. Lord, obtaining his Ph.D. in 1942. His dissertation was The raman spectra of pyrrole and some of its deuterium derivatives.

== Career ==
Miller held a post-doctoral fellowship with Bryce Crawford at the University of Minnesota for two years, before teaching at the University of Nebraska for four years. He then joined the Mellon Institute in Pittsburgh, Pennsylvania, where he became head of the spectroscopy Division in 1948. He received a Guggenheim Fellowship to work in Zürich from 1957 to 1958. In 1967, he became a professor and head of the spectroscopy laboratory at the University of Pittsburgh. He spent sabbaticals as a visiting professor in Japan (1977) and Brazil (1980). He retired as a chemistry professor emeritus at the University of Pittsburgh in 1981.

== Research ==
Miller was a pioneer in the areas of infrared and Raman spectroscopy, and their application to the understanding of molecular structure and bonding. Beginning with his dissertation work on Raman spectroscopy, he worked on the analysis of vibrational spectra of cyclic molecules such as benzene, cyclobutane, cyclopentane, cyclohexane, and pyrrole, using deuterium. He also studied the spectra of inorganic covalent compounds, long linear molecules, and molecules with unusual geometry such as cubane and cyclopropenone. An early paper with Charles H. Wilkins detailing the infrared spectra of common inorganic compounds was widely distributed by instrument manufacturers. With William G. Fateley, he wrote a number of papers on the determination of barriers to internal rotation, examining the far infrared. Miller published around 100 peer-reviewed publications and presented hundreds of invited talks. He was a co-author of Course Notes on the Interpretation of Infrared and Raman Spectra (2004).

He co-edited Spectrochimica Acta Part A: Molecular Spectroscopy from 1957 to 1963. He also edited the quarterly journal Philatelia Chimica et Physica from 1997 to 2004. He was active in the Spectroscopy Society and the Society of Analytical Chemists, and was one of the organizers of the first Pittsburgh Conference on Analytical Chemistry and Applied Spectroscopy (PITTCON), held in 1950. He was Secretary of the International Union of Pure and Applied Chemistry (IUPAC)'s Commission on Molecular Structure and Spectroscopy from 1969 to 1975.

In addition, he published around 180 articles on philately, primarily collecting and writing about physics or chemistry on stamps. In 1998 he co-authored the standard work in this area, A Philatelic Ramble Through Chemistry with Edgar Heilbronner.

== Personal life ==
While a graduate student at Johns Hopkins University, Miller met and married Naomi Zeller. They had two children, Bruce A. Miller (later of Wilmette, Illinois) and Craig F. Miller (later of Seattle, Washington).

Foil A. Miller died on September 20, 2016, in Glenview, Illinois. He was predeceased by his wife, Ruth Naomi Miller, on July 27, 2006.

== Awards and honors ==
- Member, American Chemical Society
- Member & Fellow, Optical Society of America
- Member, Spectroscopy Society of Pittsburgh
- Member, Society for Applied Spectroscopy
- Honorary Member, Coblentz Society
- 1957, Guggenheim Fellowship
- 1964, Pittsburgh Spectroscopy Award, Spectroscopy Society of Pittsburgh
- 1965, Pittsburgh Award, American Chemical Society
- 1973, Maurice F. Hasler Award, Society of Applied Spectroscopy
- 2009, Distinguished Topical Philatelist Award, American Topical Association
