= Edgar Heilbronner =

Swiss-German chemist and professor (1921–2006)

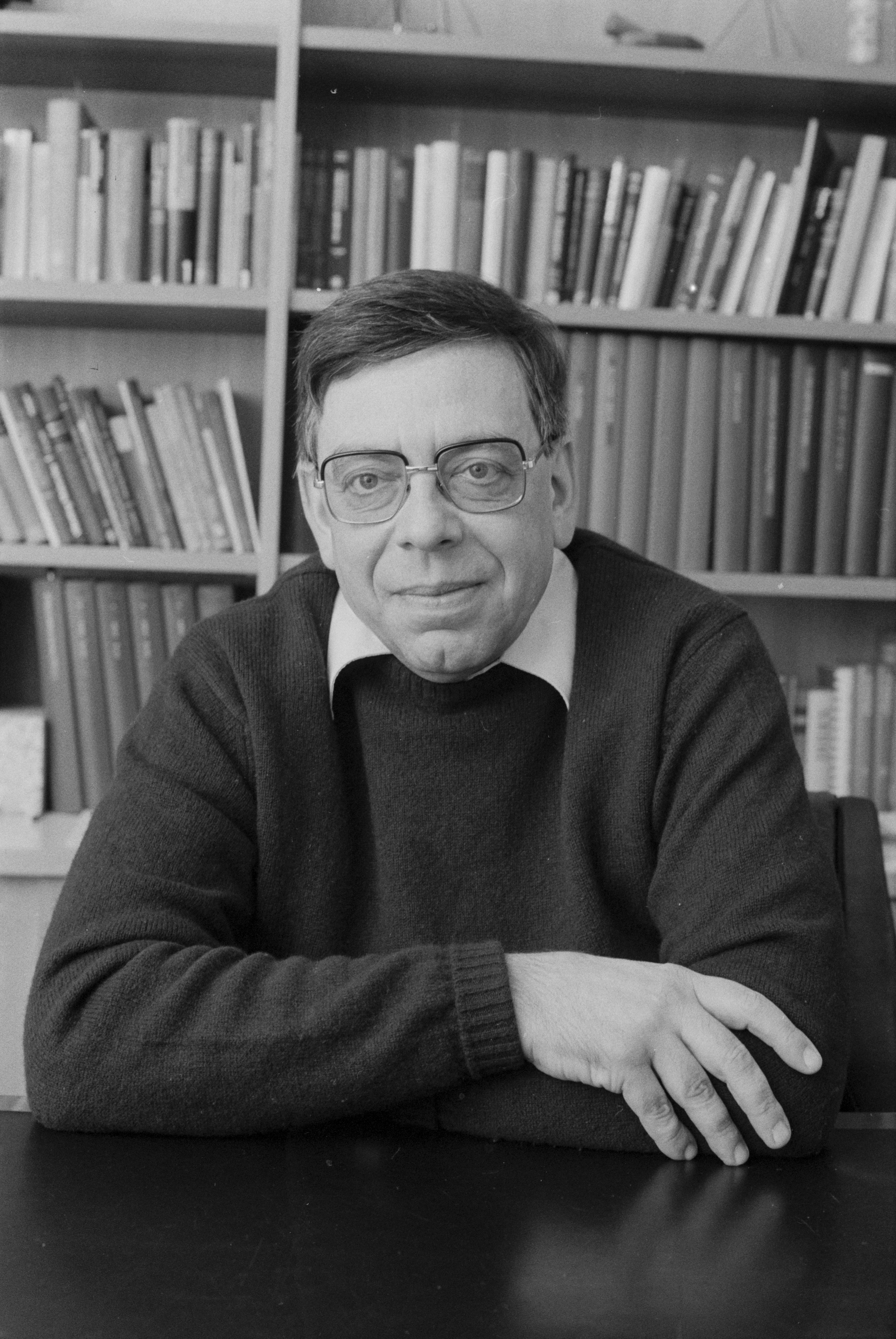
- Edgar Heilbronner (1978)
- Born: 13 May 1921; München Germany
- Died: 28 August 2006 (aged 85); Herrliberg Switzerland
- Awards: Marcel Benoist Prize (1977)
- Scientific career
- Workplaces: ETH Zurich, University of Basel

Edgar Heilbronner (13 May 1921 – 28 August 2006) was a Swiss German chemist. In 1964 he published the concept of Möbius cyclic annulenes, but the first Möbius aromatic was not synthesized until 2003.

Edgar Heilbronner was a professor at the ETH Zürich, Switzerland for many years but then was offered a professorship in Basel, Switzerland where he spent the remainder of his career.

In 1998 he co-authored the standard work in the area of chemistry on stamps, A Philatelic Ramble Through Chemistry with Foil A. Miller.
