= International Year of Chemistry =

Year-long commemorative event

International Year of Chemistry Logo

The International Year of Chemistry 2011 (IYC 2011) was a year-long commemorative event for the achievements of chemistry and its contributions to humankind. The recognition for chemistry was made official by the United Nations in December 2008. Events for the year were coordinated by the International Union of Pure and Applied Chemistry (IUPAC), and by UNESCO, the United Nations Educational, Scientific, and Cultural Organization.

== Background ==
The UN resolution calling for the International Year of Chemistry in 2011 was submitted by Ethiopia and co-sponsored by 23 nations. A case was made that chemistry makes a vital contribution towards achieving the goals of the United Nations Decade of Education for Sustainable Development, 2005–2014.

== Theme ==
The theme of IYC2011 was "Chemistry–our life, our future". It focused on the "achievements of chemistry and its contributions to the well-being of humankind." It aimed to raise awareness of chemistry among the general public and to attract young people into the field, as well as to highlight the role of chemistry in solving global problems.

== Events ==
IYC 2011 events were organized by national chemical societies, such as the American Chemical Society, the Royal Society of Chemistry, the Brazilian Chemical Society, the Society of Chemical Industry and the Royal Australian Chemical Institute, and by regional chemical federations, such as the European Association for Chemical and Molecular Sciences and the Federation of African Societies of Chemistry.

IUPAC selected 25 women for the Distinguished Women Chemistry/Chemical Engineering Award. These included Ada Yonath of Israel, Chulabhorn Walailak of Thailand, Lesley Yellowlees of the UK and Joanna S. Fowler of the US.

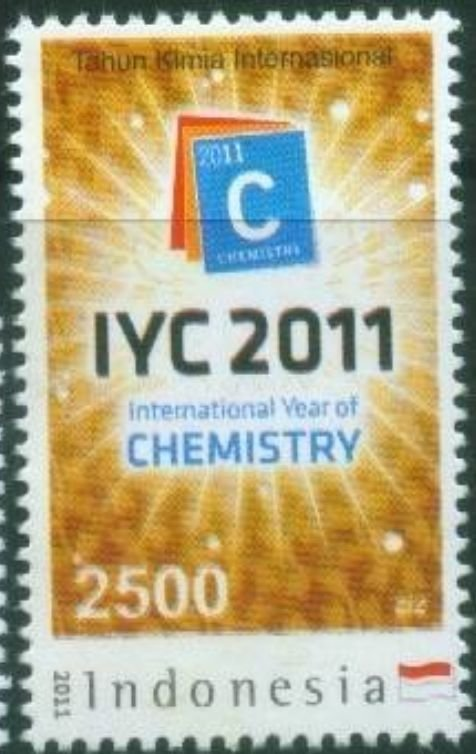
IYC, Indonesia, 2011

The IYC holds a full list of events on its website. Events scheduled were billed as: conferences, congresses, symposia, fairs, exhibitions, expositions, grand openings, lectures, meetings, open discussions, workshops, celebrations, shows, art exhibitions, and quizzes. A number of countries issued stamps with a chemical theme to commemorate the IYC.

The IYC Closing Event was held in Brussels, Belgium on 1 December 2011.

=== Some notable events ===
- See the IYC website for a full list.

==== France ====
The official launch ceremony of the IYC 2011 took place on 27–28 January in Paris at the headquarters of the United Nations Educational Scientific & Cultural Organization (UNESCO). It was attended by 1,000+ delegates from 60 countries. Four Nobel Prize Winners attended. UNESCO Director General Irina Bokova delivered the opening address.

==== Switzerland ====
In February 2011 Swiss Post issued a postage stamp bearing a depiction of a model of a molecule of vitamin C to mark the International Year of Chemistry. Swiss chemist Tadeus Reichstein synthesised the vitamin for the first time in 1933.

==== United Kingdom ====
The Royal Society of Chemistry celebrated IYC 2011 by reviewing the most significant chemical advances since the millennium.

==== Australia ====
An international conference was held as an official IYC event at the UNESCO World Heritage Listed Lord Howe Island between 14 and 18 August entitled 'Towards Global Artificial Photosynthesis: Energy, Nanochemistry and Governance.'

==== Canada ====
Canada had many demonstrations for the year of chemistry. 32 universities all around Canada participated. Dalhousie University made a "chemistry rendezvous" for 7 May. It included a tour of the chemistry lab, food and demonstrations.

== See also ==
- International observance
- 2011 in science
