= Chemistry on stamps =

Postage stamps with a chemical theme

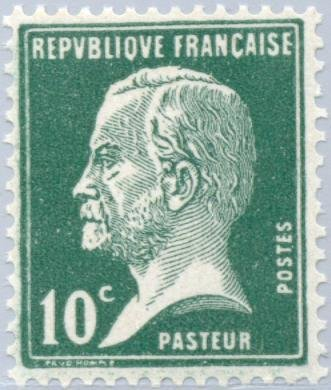
Louis Pasteur, France, 1923

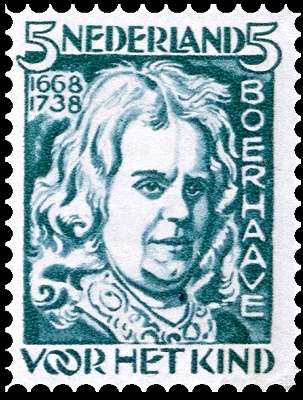
Herman Boerhaave, Netherlands, 1928

The depiction of chemistry on stamps began in 1923 with the issue of a set of definitive French stamps commemorating the chemist and microbiologist Louis Pasteur. Another early chemical stamp depicted the botanist and chemist Herman Boerhaave. The depiction of chemistry on stamps contributes to chemical education and to the public understanding of science.

== Scope ==
A chemical stamp has one or more of the following characteristics:

- It depicts a chemist, or a polymath who did significant work in the chemical field
- It depicts a chemical concept, such as the periodic table, or a chemical object, such as laboratory glassware
- It depicts a chemical element, atom, molecule, symbol or formula
- It commemorates a chemistry event, such as an international congress, or an international year in the chemical field
- It celebrates the jubilee of a chemistry institution, such as IUPAC or the American Chemical Society
- It depicts the process of chemistry education, or a building used primarily for chemistry research or education

Stamps may depict a specific area of chemistry such as physical, analytical, spectroscopic, organic, or inorganic.

The following types of material are excluded (although they may also be collected by chemical stamp enthusiasts):

- Postal stationery, e.g. a postcard depicting a chemist with a non-chemical stamp affixed
- Cinderella, local, private or personal issues, i.e. unofficial stamps
- Non-postal stamps, e.g. revenue stamps
- Stamps issued by non-existing/unrecognized countries and/or in excess of actual postal requirements

== Examples ==
=== Chemists ===
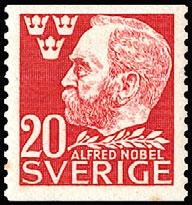
Alfred Nobel, Sweden, 1946

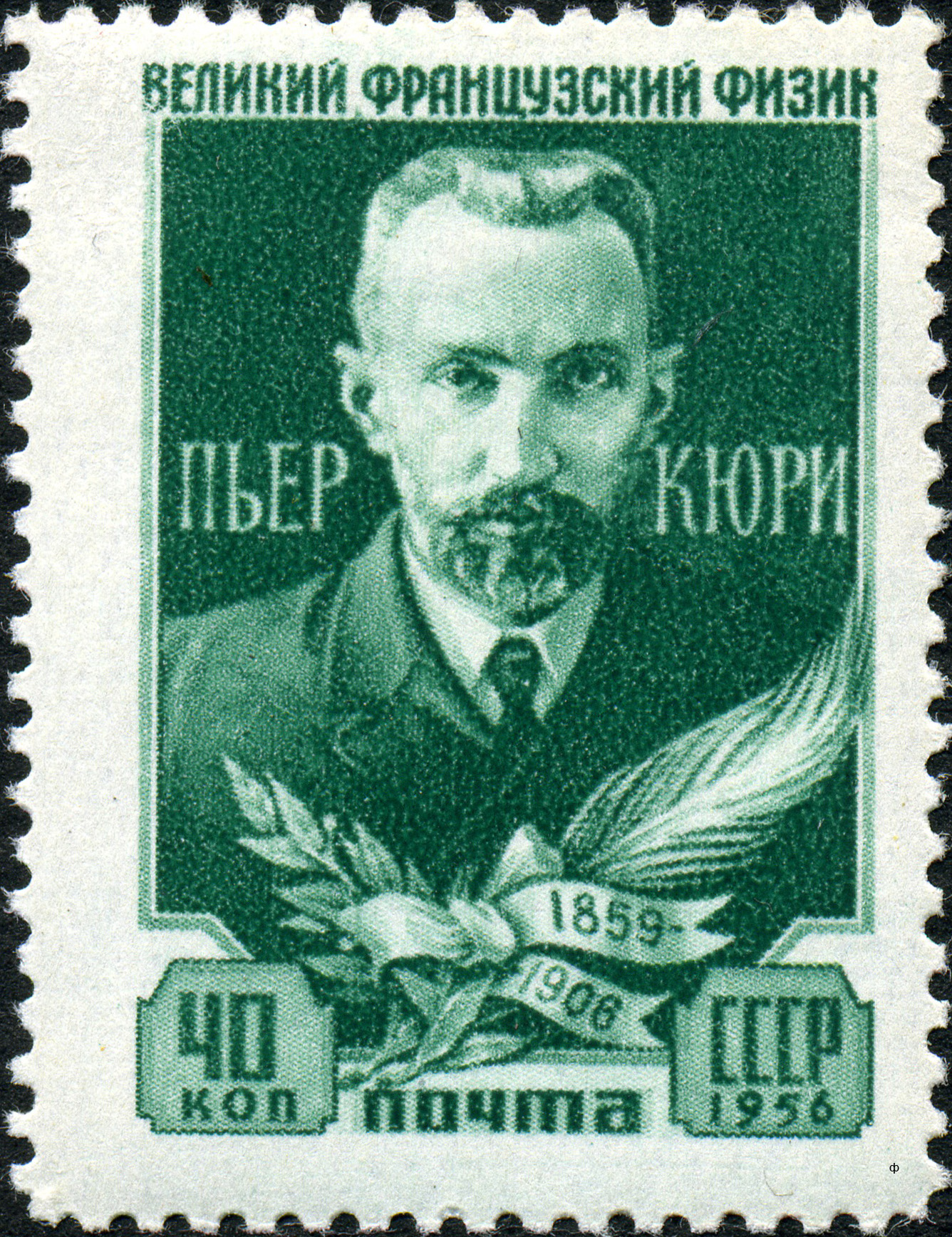
Pierre Curie, USSR, 1956

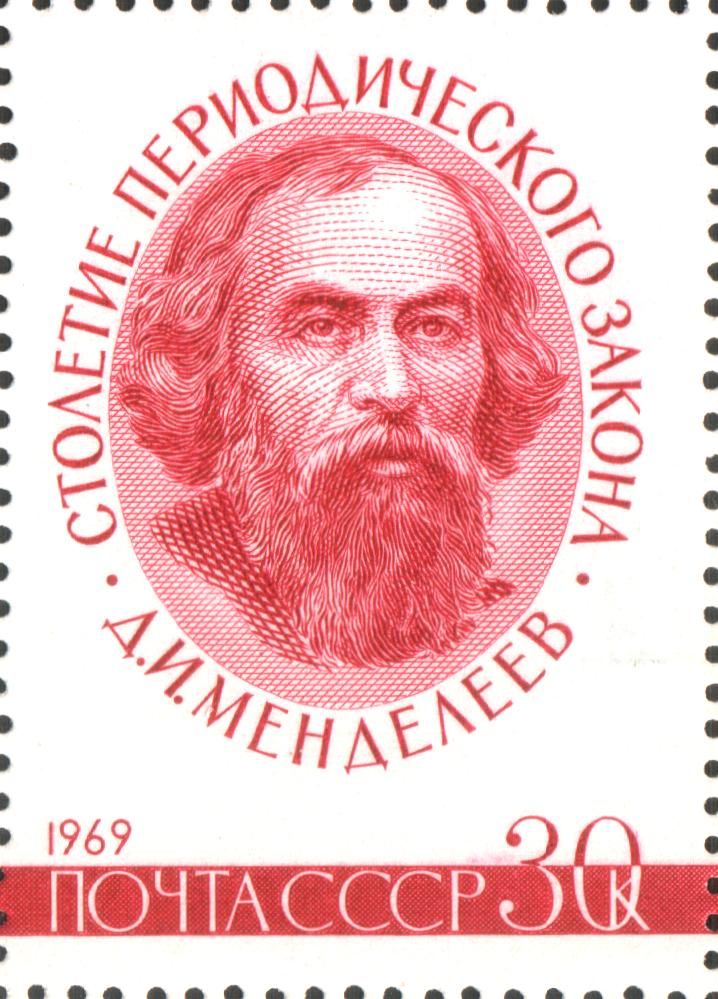
Dmitri Mendeleev, USSR, 1969

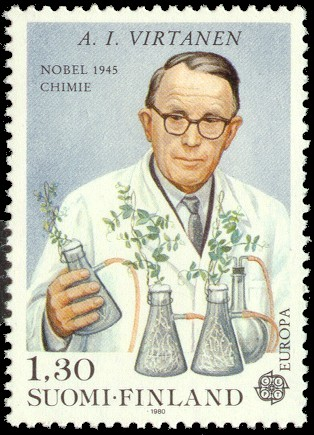
A.I. Virtanen, Finland, 1980

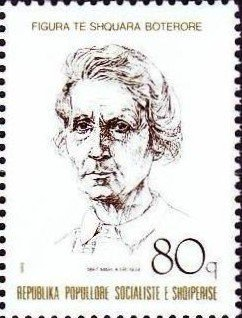
Marie Curie, Albania, 1989

Stamps depicting individual chemists are often issued by countries to commemorate the birth or death anniversaries of their significant national chemists, for example stamps issued by Russia celebrating Dmitri Mendeleev. Examples are illustrated in the gallery above. Some countries have also issued stamps depicting internationally famous chemists such as Marie Curie or Alfred Nobel.

=== Chemical concepts and objects ===
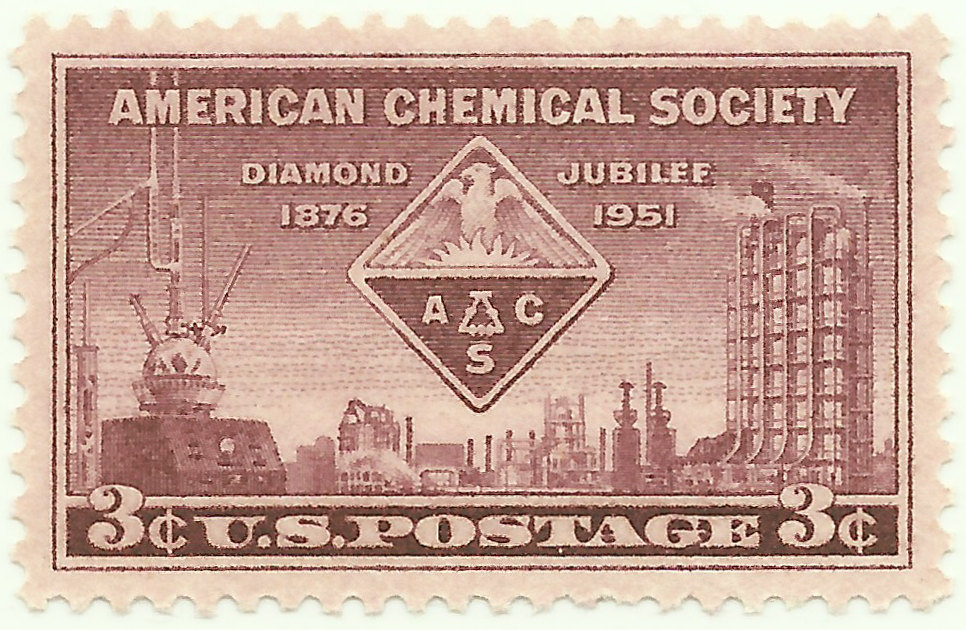
Chemical industry, USA, 1951

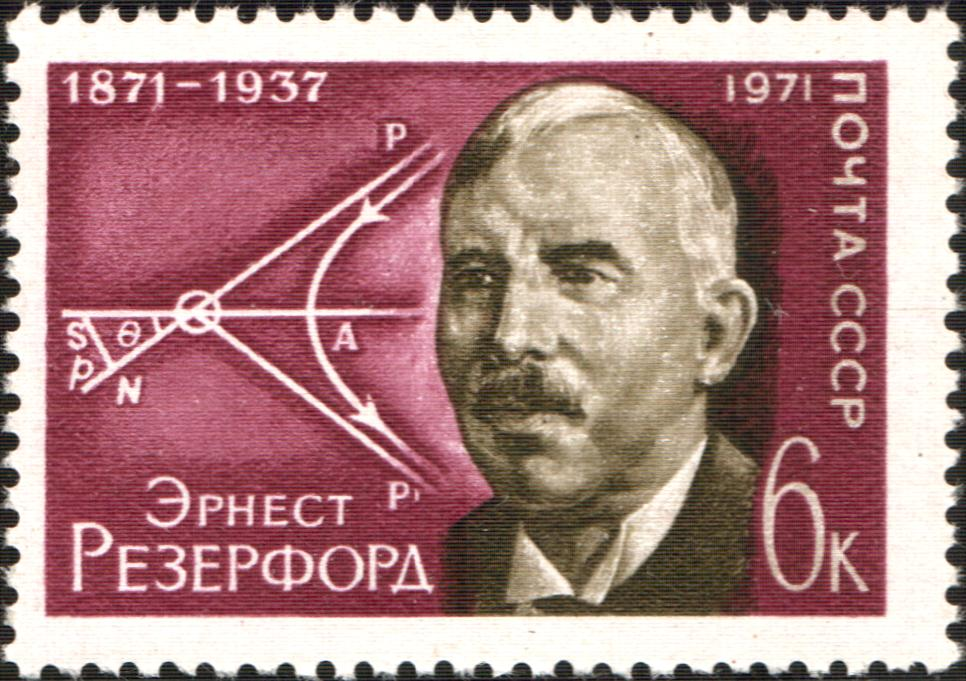
Rutherford Scattering, USSR, 1971

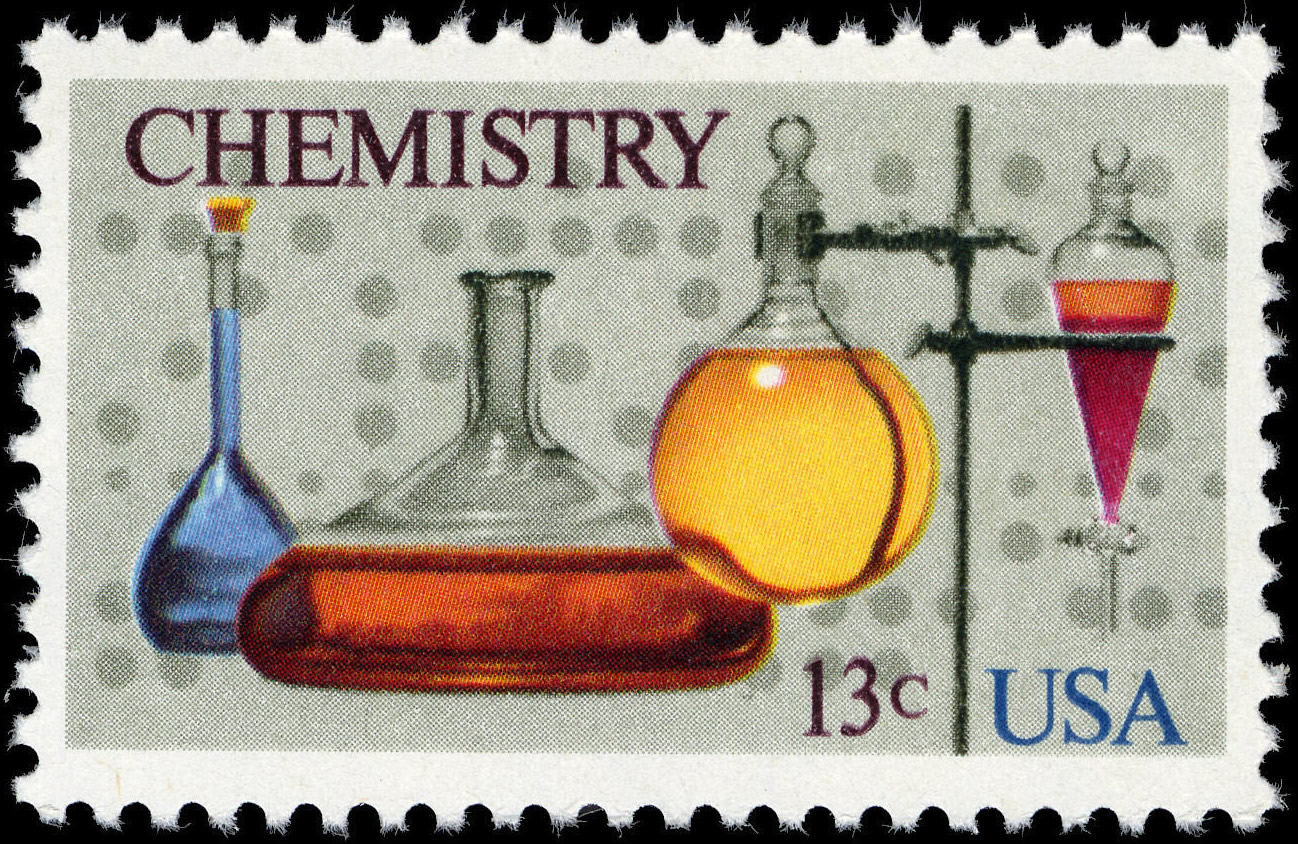
Laboratory glassware, USA, 1976

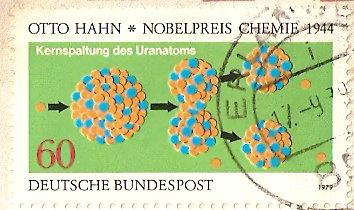
Nuclear fission, West Germany, 1979

Stamps depicting a chemical concept or object, sometimes combined with a portrait of the chemist responsible for inventing the concept or object, are generally issued as commemorative stamps rather than definitive stamps. Examples are shown in the gallery above: a 1951 American stamp illustrating chemical industry and also celebrating the diamond jubilee of the American Chemical Society, a 1971 Soviet stamp illustrating Rutherford Scattering, a 1976 American stamp depicting Laboratory glassware, and a 1979 West German stamp illustrating nuclear fission and also commemorating Otto Hahn's 1944 Nobel prize in chemistry.

=== Chemical elements, symbols, formulae, organisations and events ===
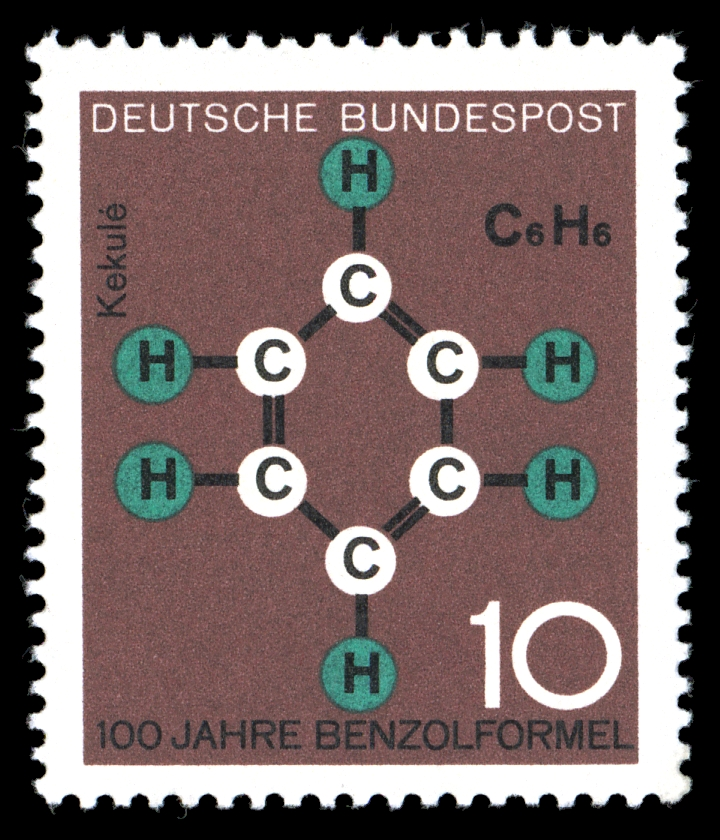
Benzene, West Germany, 1964

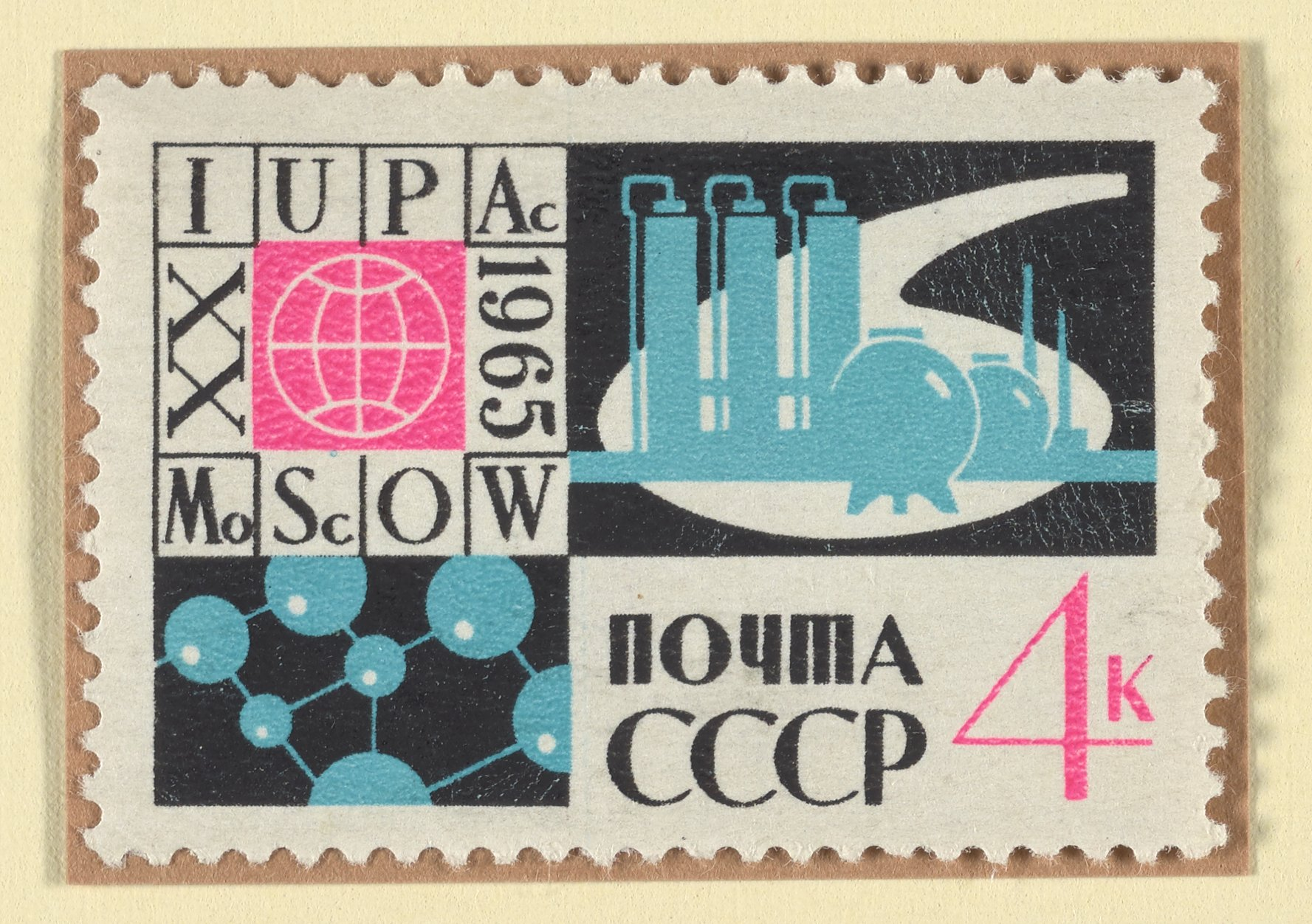
IUPAC, USSR, 1965

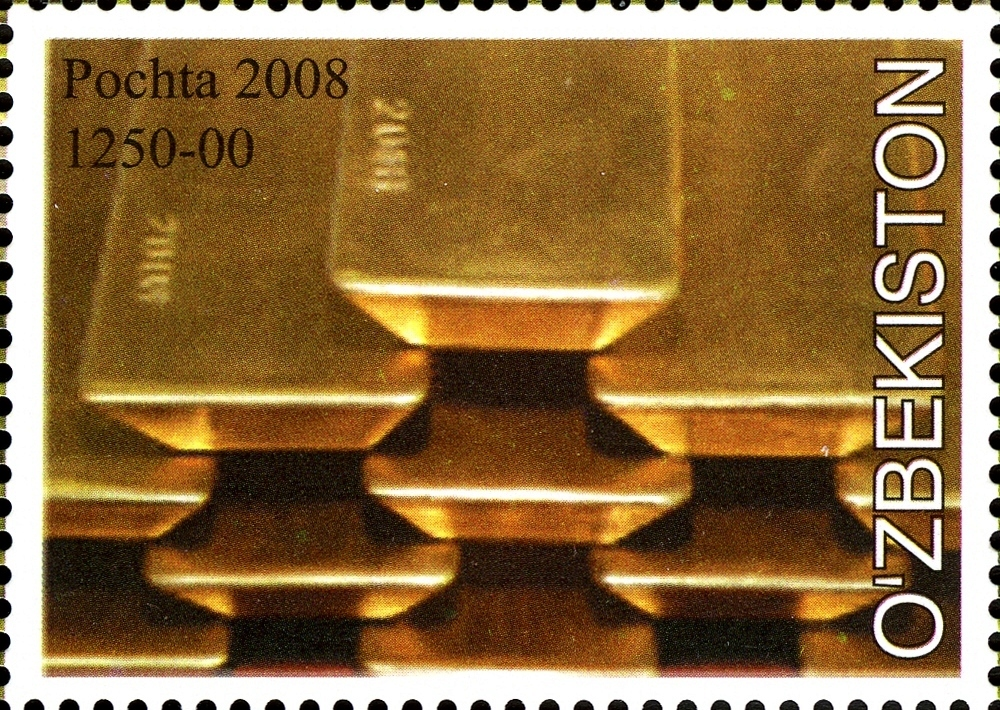
Gold, Uzbekistan, 2008

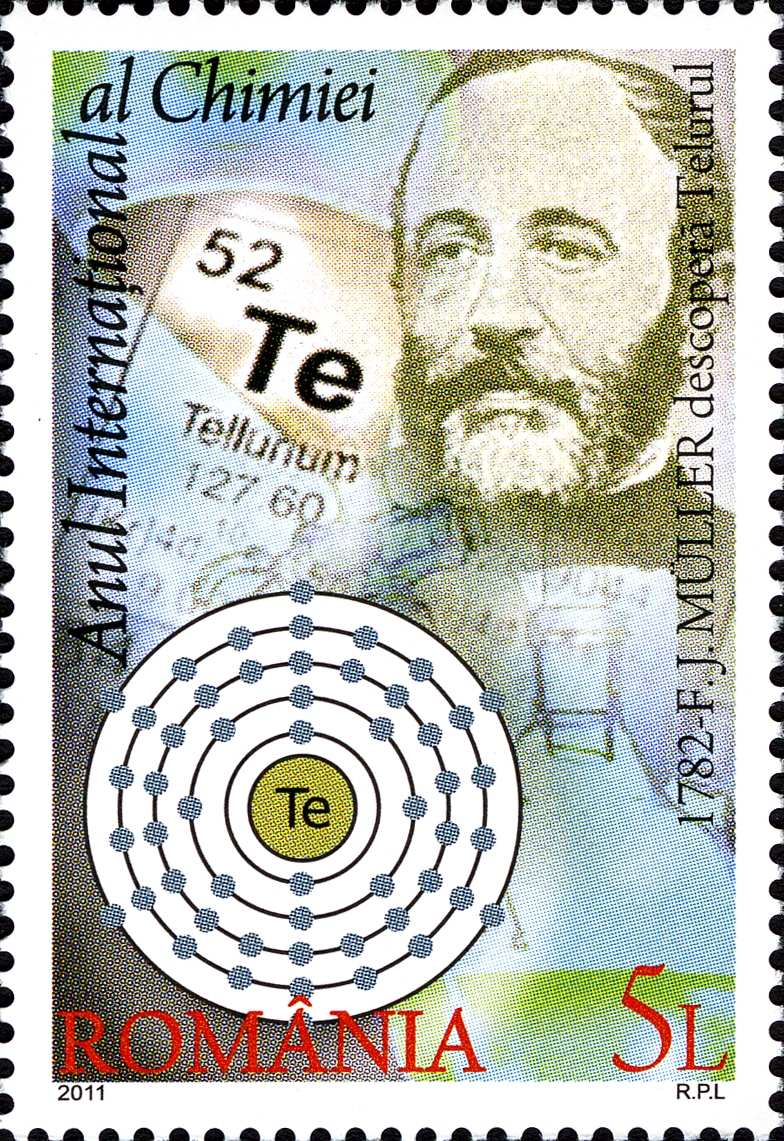
Tellurium electron shell, Romania, 2011

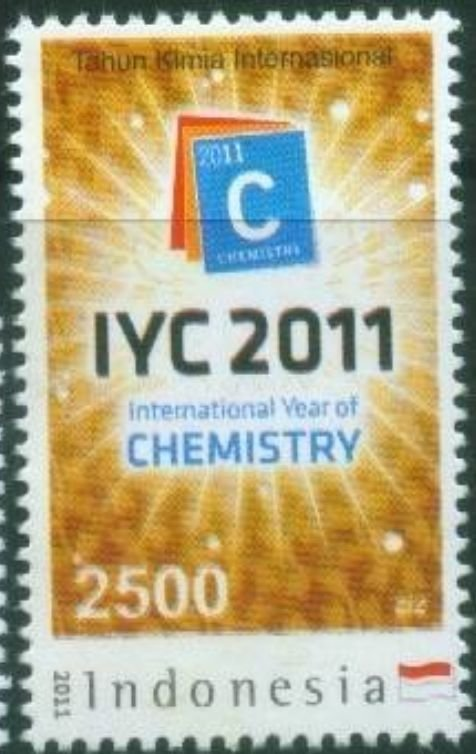
International Year of Chemistry, Indonesia, 2011

Stamps depicting a chemical symbol or formula are frequently depicted together with the chemist they are primarily associated with. Examples are shown in the gallery above: a 1964 West German stamp illustrating the benzene structure associated with August Kekulé, a 1965 Soviet stamp commemorating the 1965 IUPAC meeting in Moscow, a 2008 Uzbeki stamp illustrating the element gold, a 2011 Romanian stamp depicting the electron structure of Tellurium and the chemist F.J. Müller, and a 2011 Indonesian stamp issued for the International Year of Chemistry.

== Publications ==
The chemists Edgar Heilbronner and Foil Miller published the book A philatelic ramble through chemistry in 1998 (reissued in 2004) which was well reviewed. Prior to this, Foil Miller and George Kauffman had published a series of articles on Alfred Nobel, and on Nobel Laureates in Chemistry in The Journal of Chemical Education.

Daniel Rabinovich is the current leading writer in the field having published articles on the International Year of Chemistry, the International System of Units, the International Year of the Periodic Table, Roald Hoffmann, and also making presentations on the subject to chemistry departments and at chemistry conferences.

The Chemistry and Physics on Stamps Study Unit (CPOSSU) of the American Topical Association has published a members' journal Philatelia Chimica et Physica since 1979.

Listings of new issues of chemical stamps are included in the monthly Scott Stamp magazine and in Linn's Stamp News; they are also available online from October 2010 to date in the Science & Technology section.
