= Insects on stamps =

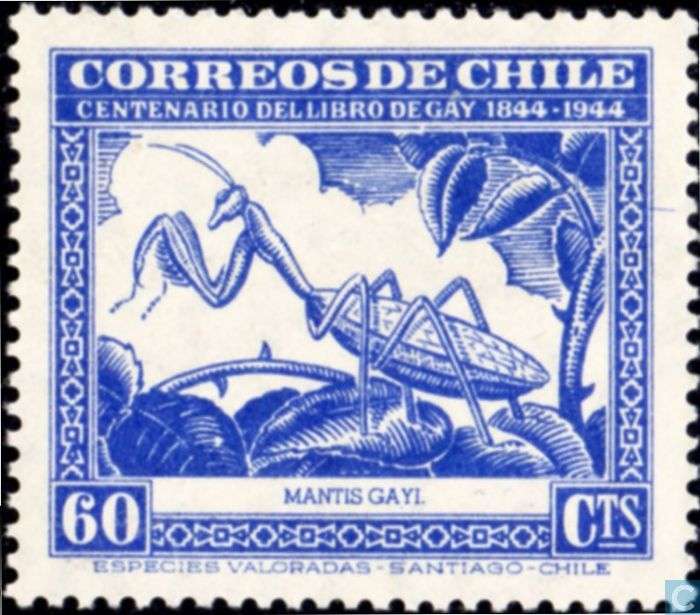
1948 stamp of Chile showing a mantis.

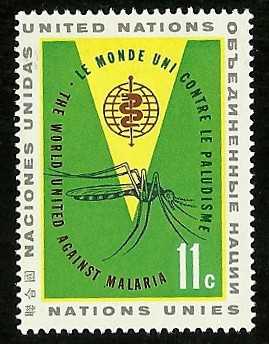
An UN anti-malaria stamp

Many countries have featured insects on stamps. Insect related topics such as the mosquito eradication (anti malaria) programme of the 1960s as well as graphic designs based on insects have also appeared. Many stamps also feature butterflies.

Insects only started to appear on stamps much later than other larger and more attractive animals. The first postal stamp featuring a beetle was released in 1948 in Chile as a tribute to natural historian Claudio Gay. Since then, insects have become popular subjects in philately. Between 1953 and 1969, about 100 stamps featuring beetles were published worldwide. Most of the time, aesthetically attractive species are pictured, but some stamps also feature pests. In other instances, due to simplified drawing, it is hard to identify what species is depicted on the stamp.

== See also ==
- Topical stamp collecting
- Stamp catalog
