= Bicycle mail =

Postal service and/or a special type of postage stamp

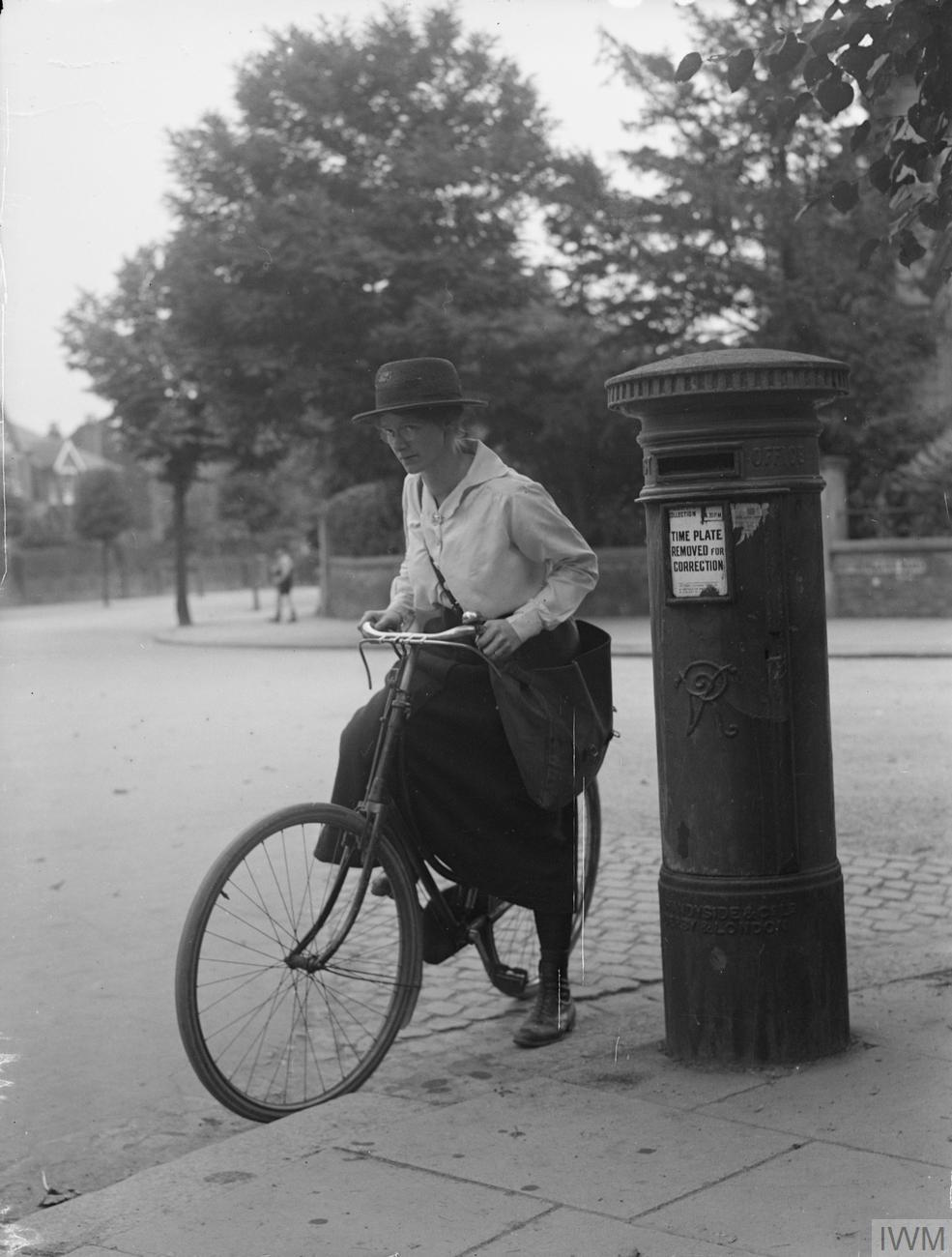
A letter carrier departing via bicycle after retrieving the mail from a pillar box

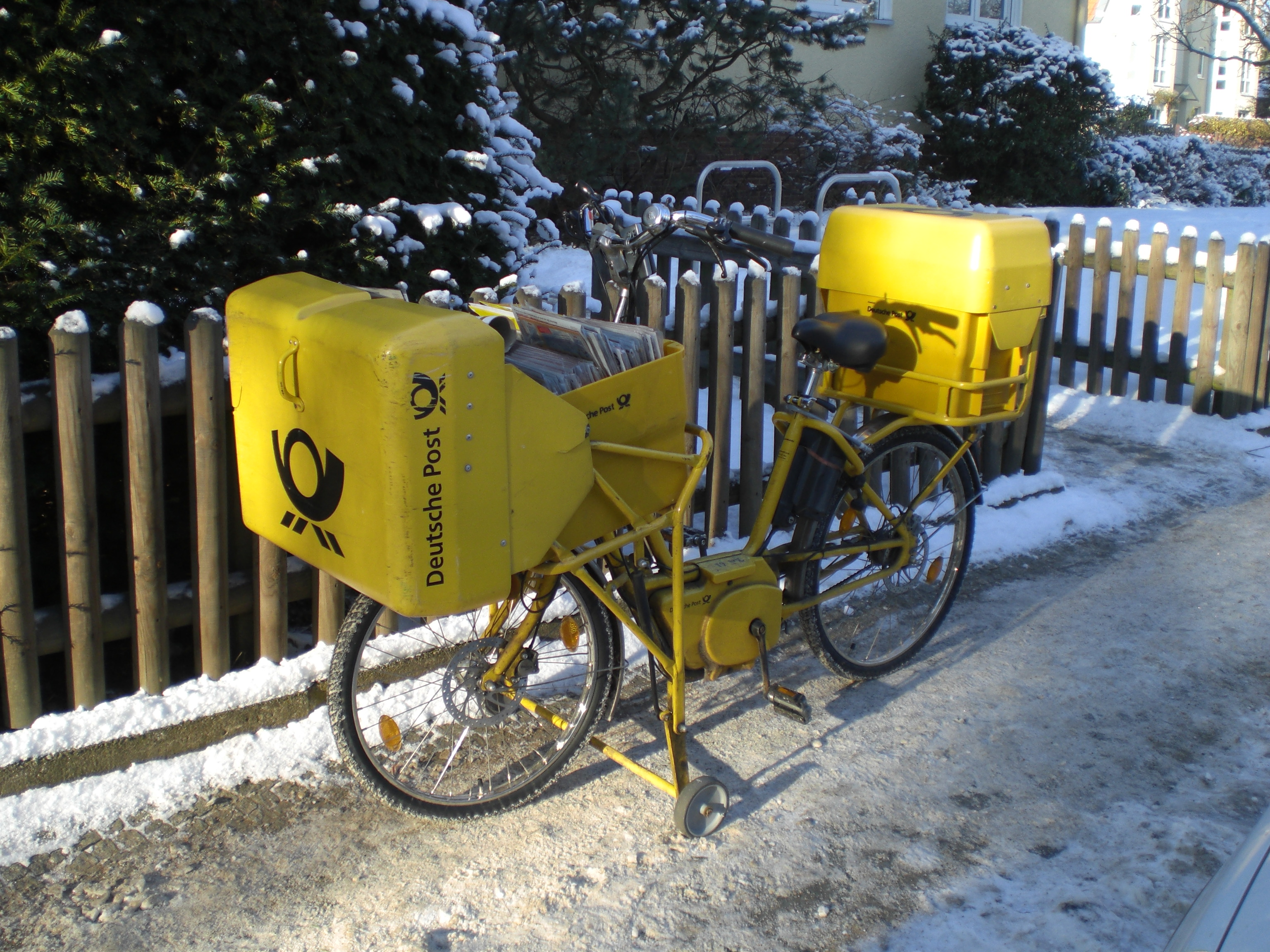
A German mail bicycle

Bicycle mail can cover two separate and distinctive areas. It can be used to describe the Thematic (Topical) collecting and/or study of stamps bearing the image of bicycles, or more commonly used to describe a specific category of Special Delivery, where mail was delivered by bicycle and is identified by stamp and or postal mark used.

== History ==
Prior to the advent of bicycle mail, the most common forms of mail delivery was on foot, horse (local routes), and train for longer distances. In some countries bicycle mail became more prevalent during periods of railroad strikes to keep local mail routes active. It was also used as an alternative to horse and foot delivered mail in rural areas. By the 1930s most countries had greatly diminished the use of bicycles for the delivery of mail in favor of the automobile for local delivery.

Some bicycle mail was used for local routes in an unofficial capacity. One example of this took place in 1896 in Western Australia. In the United States during the 1890s, a specific example of bicycle mail being used in place of rail delivery occurred during a strike on the established mail route between Fresno and San Francisco, California.

Bicycle mail is still used widely in Japan for delivery to government agencies which only accept the delivery of physical documents.
