= Bicycles on stamps =

Sport and non-sport bicycle stamps

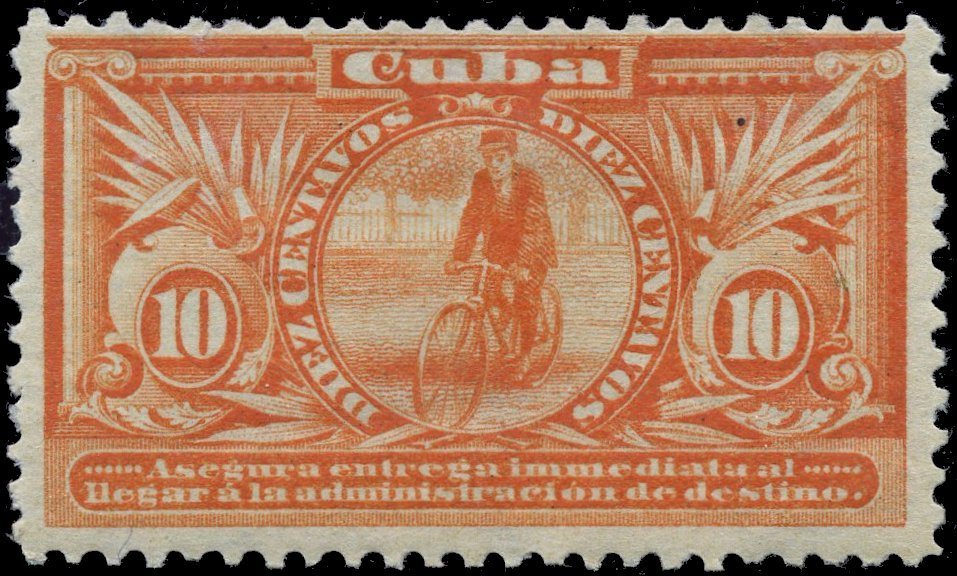
Cuba special delivery 1899

The depiction of bicycles on stamps began in 1899 with a Cuban special delivery stamp, although unofficial (local or cinderella) issues had been previously released in Germany (1887/8), in the United States (1894), and in Australia (1896). The number of bicycle-related postal items (stamps, postal stationery, etc.) exceeds 30,000 as of 2024. As a thematic topic, bicycles are notable for the wide variety of subjects that they are used to illustrate.

== Definition ==
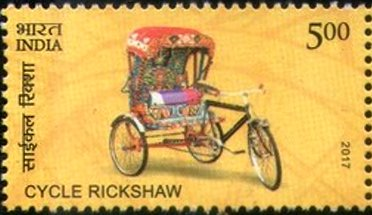
India cycle rickshaw 2017

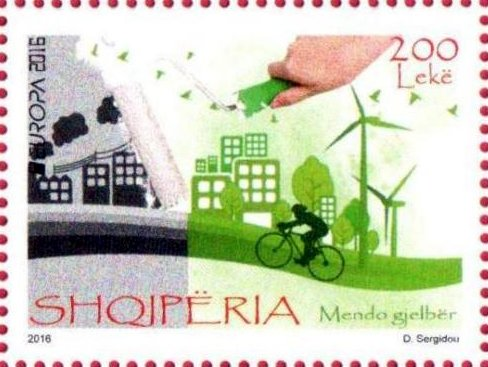
Albania Think Green 2016

The definition of what constitutes a bicycle stamp is open to interpretation. A bicycle stamp (Note: A perfin meeting one or more of the characteristics is a valid bicycle stamp.) has one or more of the following characteristics:

- It depicts a human-powered cycling machine. This includes a whole (or part of) bicycles, tricycles, unicycles, toy cycles, tandems, rickshaws, exercise/standing bicycles, etc. It excludes powered or unpowered wheelchairs and motor-driven or motor-assisted cycling machines, e.g. motorcycles, mopeds. (Note: Some collectors believe that the existence of human-powered parts, such as pedals and a bicycle chain, in the pictured bicycle should make the image acceptable as a bicycle stamp, even if the machine is power-assisted.)
- It depicts a bicycle or cyclist in a social context. For example, a cyclist in a street scene, cycling as an energy-efficient, green, mode of transport, or cycling promoting road safety.
- It depicts a building used specifically for cycling sport, i.e. a velodrome.
- It depicts a person notable for being a cyclist, e.g. a winner of the Tour de France, or cycling events at the Olympic Games.
- It depicts the process of manufacturing a bicycle, or a notable bicycle manufacturer (individual or firm).
- It depicts the word "bicycle" in the local language, even if the image of a bicycle is not included. The word triathlon without an image of a bicycle is excluded.

The following types of material are excluded (although they may also be collected by bicycle stamp enthusiasts):

- Postal stationery, e.g. a postcard depicting a bicycle with a non-bicycle stamp affixed.
- Cinderella, local, private or personal issues, i.e. unofficial stamps.
- Non-postal stamps, e.g. revenue stamps such as the French 1940s "Impôt sur les vélocipèdes".
- Stamps issued by non-existing/unrecognized countries and/or in excess of actual postal requirements.

== Early issues ==
The first bicycle stamp of the 20th century was a 1900 stamp issued for local postal delivery during the siege of Mafeking, depicting Cadet Sgt. Major Goodyear on a bicycle. The United States issued a special delivery bicycle messenger stamp in 1902. Bulgaria issued a cycling stamp as part of a set commemorating the Balkan games of 1931. In 1935 the USSR issued a bicycle stamp to commemorate the World Spartacist Games. Denmark issued a stamp showing King Christian X on horseback as part of his silver jubilee celebrations in 1937; in the background of the street scene are three cyclists.

These early issues illustrate the wide variety of subjects depicted on bicycle stamps.

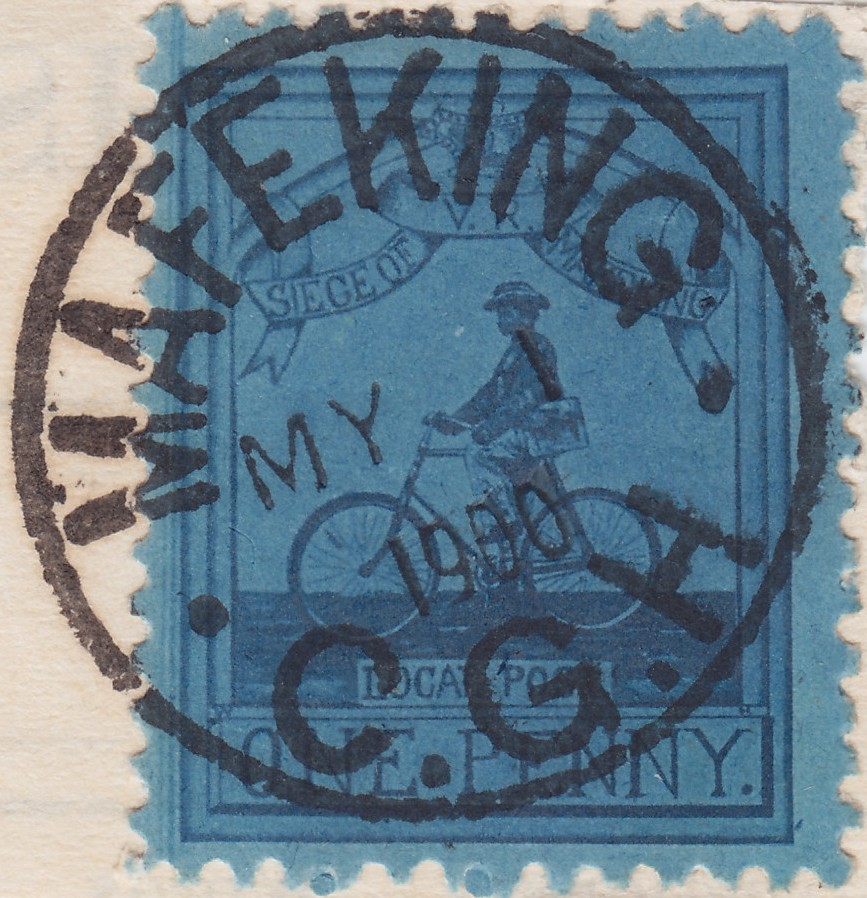
Siege of Mafeking local stamp 1900

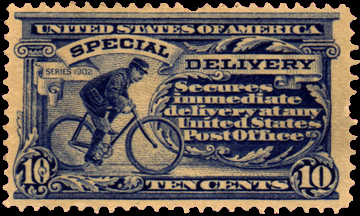
United States special delivery bicycle messenger stamp 1902

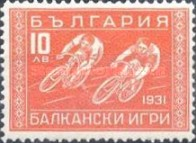
Bulgaria Balkan games racing cyclists stamp 1931

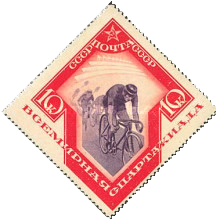
USSR World Spartacist Games 1935

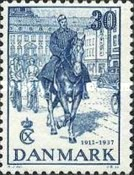
Denmark street scene 1937

== Depiction of cycle sports ==
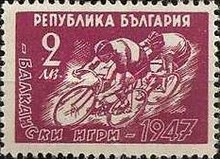
Bulgaria Balkan Games 1947

Cycle sports include:

- Indoor
  - Cycle racing
  - Velodromes
- Outdoor
  - Event racing, e.g. cycling to raise money for charities
  - Tour racing, e.g. the Giro d'Italia

== Depiction of non-sport uses ==
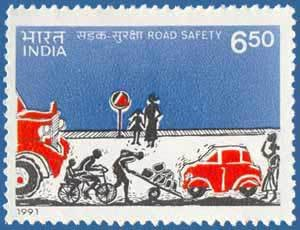
India road safety 1991

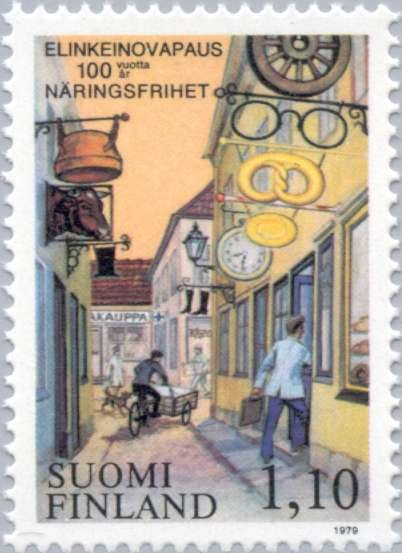
Finland commercial delivery 1979

Subjects depicted on non-sport bicycle stamps include:

- The history of the bicycle
- Bicycle industrial manufacturing
- Bicycle mail transportation and postal delivery
- Bicycles for commercial delivery
- People transportation e.g. by rickshaw
- Bicycle military use
- Bicycles as toys
- Bicycle tourism
- Bicycles in street scenes
- Bicycles to symbolize alternative, energy-efficient transport
- Bicycles depicting or encouraging road traffic safety

== Bibliography ==
- Sudbury, Ronald F. (1976). The bicycle and the postage stamp. Batley: Harry Hayes. p. 62. ISBN 9780905222141.
- Sudbury, Ronald F. (1981). Stamp collecting for the cyclist. Batley: Harry Hayes. p. 60. ISBN 9780905222424.
- Mangin, Jean-Pierre; Geslin, René (1988). Le cycle et la poste (in French). Bar le Duc: J.-P. Mangin. p. 319. OCLC 465817564.
- Gindling, Dan (1997). Bicycle stamps: bikes and cycling on the world's postage stamps. Osceola, WI: Motorbooks International. p. 144. ISBN 9780933201781.
