= American First Day Cover Society =

- Formation: 1955
- Website: afdcs.org

The American First Day Cover Society (AFDCS) is a US-based non-profit organization serving the needs of First Day Cover collectors, cachetmakers, and dealers.

== Philatelic Services ==
First Days is an official publication of the American First Day Cover Society. Published six times per year, the magazine is filled with articles and features covering all areas of First Day Cover (FDC) collecting for both beginners and advanced collectors. Current Editor is Anthony Bard. AFDCS also publishes educational materials on FDC collecting and cachetmaking, and an updated directory of cachetmakers.

== Members ==
AFDCS has over 30 chapters and 1,100 first day cover collectors, including many who design and manufacture their own cacheted FDCs.

== Events ==
The Americover show is the annual convention of the American First Day Cover Society and is currently a part of the Great American Stamp Show (GASS). Americover 2025 was held in Schaumburg, Illinois, August 14–17, with over 130 frames of exhibits.
