= American Topical Association =

U.S. philatelic society focused on topical collecting

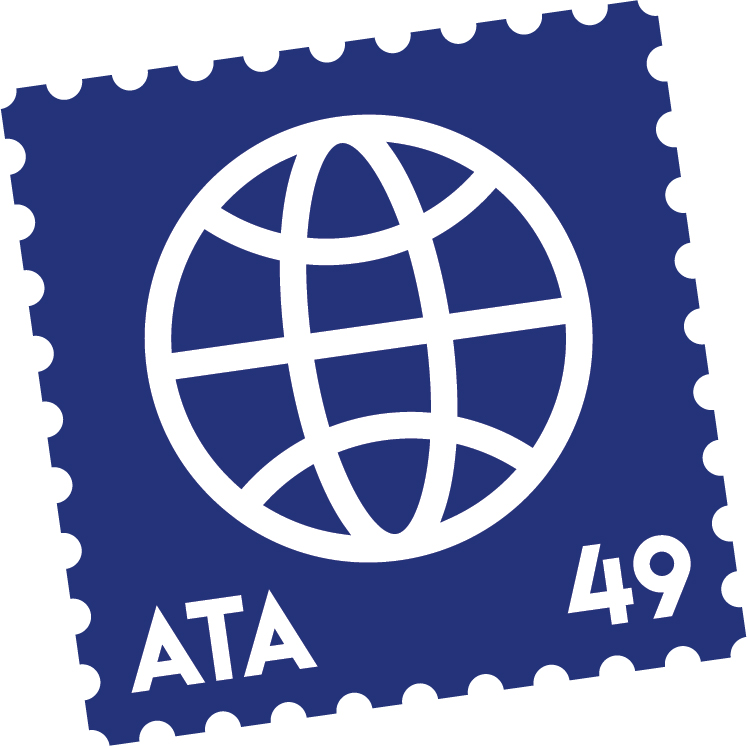
- Formation: 1949
- Founder: Jerome "Jerry" Husak
- Type: Philatelic society; nonprofit
- Legal status: 501(c)(3)
- Headquarters: Greer, South Carolina, U.S.
- Region served: Worldwide
- Website: americantopical.org

The American Topical Association (ATA) is a United States–based philatelic society founded in 1949 in Milwaukee, Wisconsin, devoted to topical and thematic stamp collecting. It publishes the bi-monthly journal Topical Time and supports affiliated study units and local chapters. Since 2021 the ATA has partnered with the American Philatelic Society and the American First Day Cover Society to co-organize the Great American Stamp Show.

== History ==
The American Topical Association (ATA) was established in 1949 in Milwaukee, Wisconsin by Jerome (Jerry) Husak.

In 1988, the ATA became an affiliate of the American Philatelic Society.

The ATA celebrated its 75th anniversary in 2024.

== Publications and activities ==
The American Topical Association publishes the bi-monthly journal Topical Time, which features articles on thematic and topical stamp collecting, research notes, and society news. Regular columns include “Topics on Postmarks,” “Chapter Chatter,” and “Units in Action.” The journal is available to members in print and digital formats.

ATA members participate in regional and international chapters that meet throughout the United States and abroad. As of the early 2020s, the association recognized about forty affiliated chapters, including groups in Canada, Australia, Great Britain, and South Africa.

Members with shared collecting interests organize into topical study units that promote research on specific themes such as Americana or wine on stamps. These study units often compile and publish specialized reference materials.

The association also produces handbooks on particular topics in thematic collecting and maintains a checklist service covering hundreds of subjects. These resources provide catalog-style data, such as country, issue date, denomination, and catalogue number, to assist collectors in identifying and organizing topical material.

== Members ==
ATA has members in approximately 50 countries. ATA also supports 50+ affiliated study units and 40+ affiliated local chapters.

== Awards ==
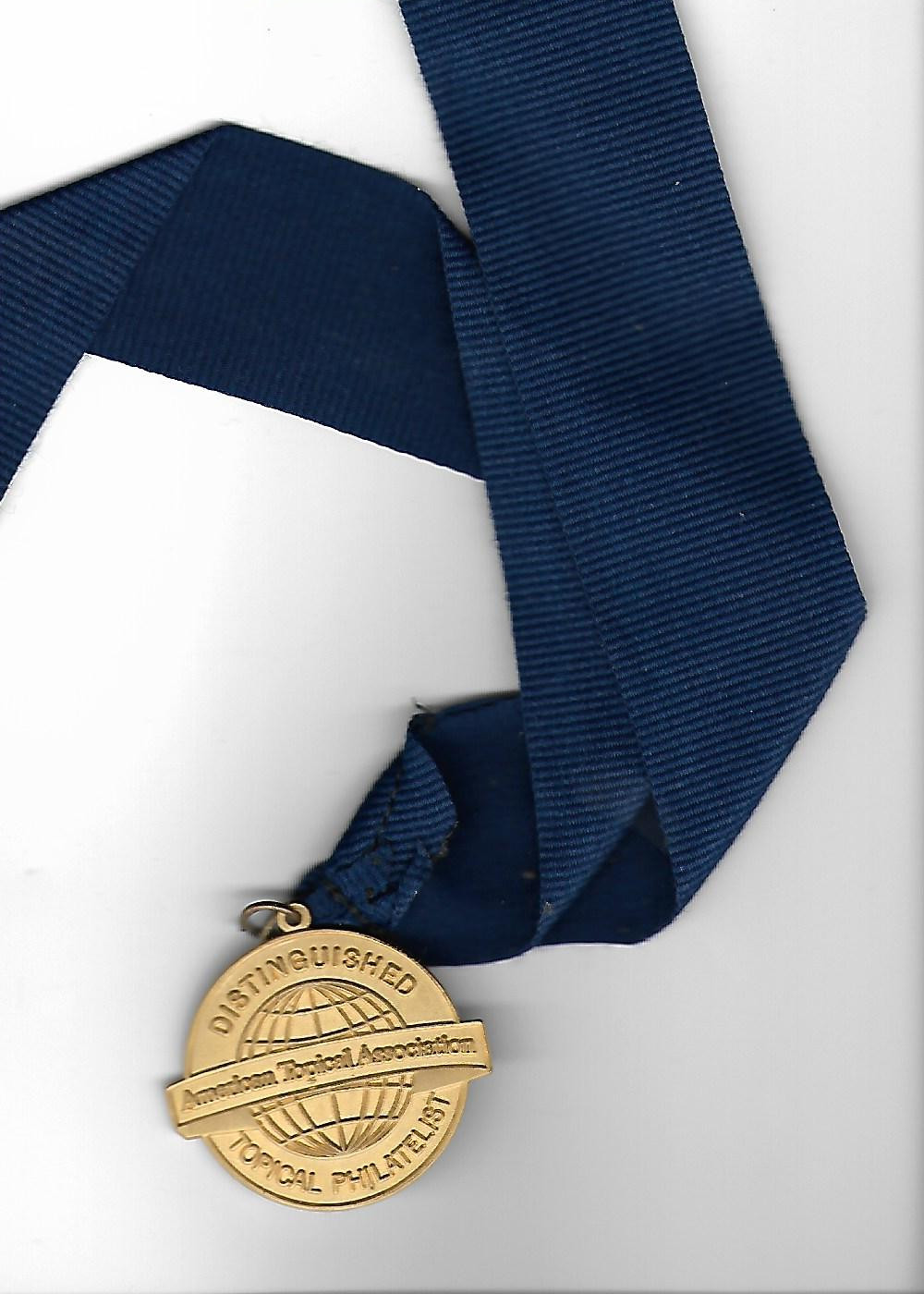
ATA Distinguished Topical Philatelist medal

The Distinguished Topical Philatelist (DTP) is the highest service award offered by the ATA, given for service to topical philately in general and to the ATA in particular. It was established in 1952 by ATA's founder Jerry Husak and has been presented to over 120 individuals, including residents of Canada, Great Britain, Italy, and the United States, since its inception. The first Distinguished Topical Philatelist award was presented to Allyn H Wright in 1952. The annual award ceremony is held during the ATA's National Topical Stamp Show.

== Events ==
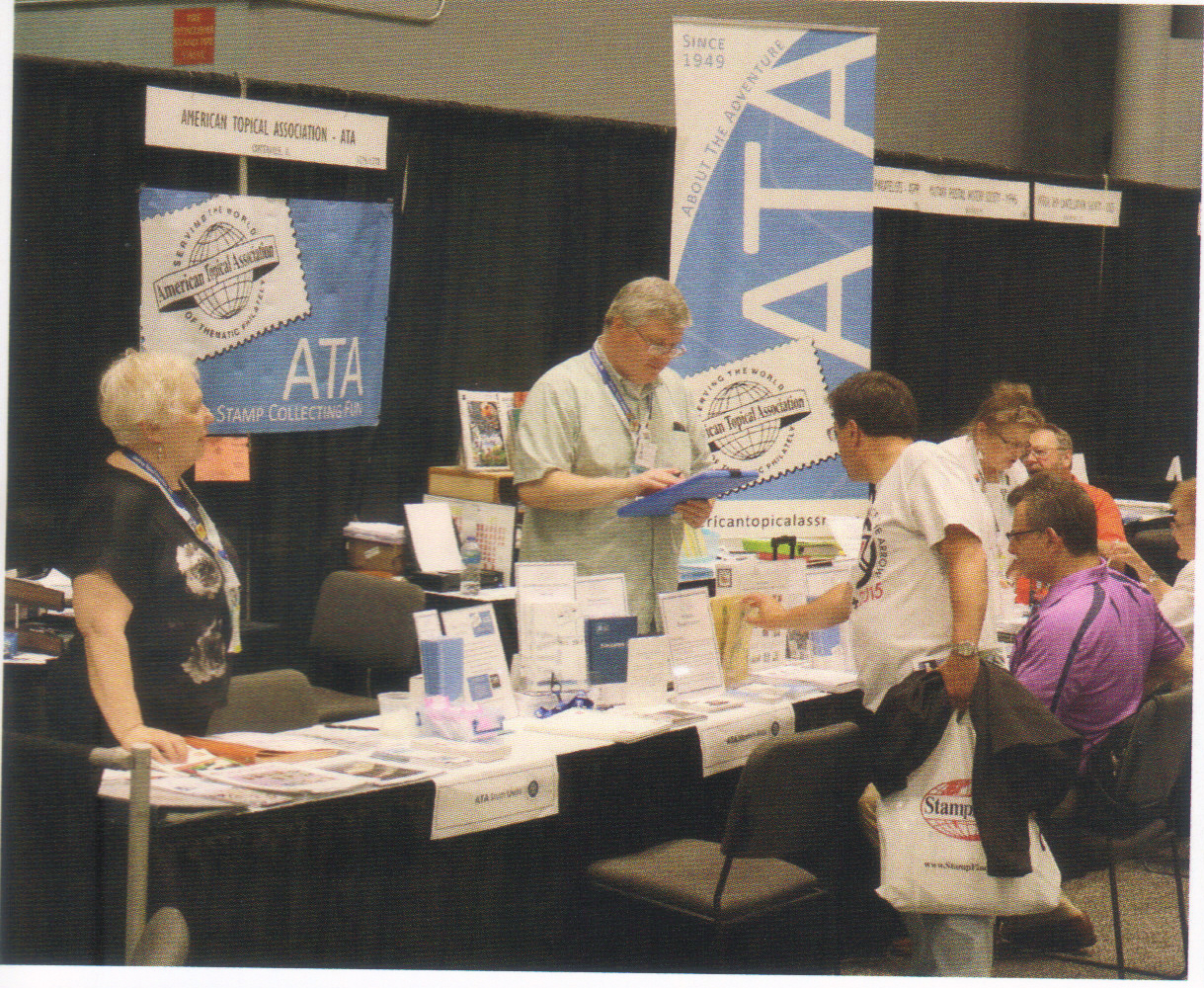
ATA table at the World Stamp Show-NY 2016 at the Javits Center in New York City.

ATA's annual National Topical Stamp Show was an all-thematic philatelic exhibition and dealer bourse with meetings, seminars, and youth activities for collectors.

In June 2017, ATA and American Philatelic Society (APS) announced that they will combine their annual national shows starting in 2018. The combined show was held in August 2018 at the Greater Columbus Convention Center in Columbus, Ohio.

Starting in 2021, ATA, APS and the American First Day Cover Society (AFDCS) joined forces to organize a combined annual show called the Great American Stamp Show. The first combined show was held in August 2021 at the Donald E. Stephens Convention Center in Rosemont, Illinois.
