= Postage stamps and postal history of Mexico =

The Mexican postal system has its roots in the Aztec system of messengers which the Spanish adopted after the Conquest. A postal service was established in 1580, mainly to communicate between the viceroyalty of New Spain with the motherland Spain. During the 18th century, Spain established a formal postal system with regular routes. In 1856, Mexico issued its first adhesive postage stamps, with "district overprints", a unique feature among postal systems worldwide, employed to protect from theft of postage stamps.

In 1891, the postal and stamp issuing authority was created as an administrative division of the Secretaría de Comunicaciones (Secretariat of Communications). It was called Servicio Postal Mexicano (Sepomex). In 1901, the Dirección General de Correos (General Direction of Mail) was made a separate government agency. The Palacio de Correos de Mexico is used since 1907 as main post office.

The Mexican Revolution and ensuing Civil Wars (1910–1920) resulted in numerous provisional and local stamps issued by the factions in control of different areas of the country.

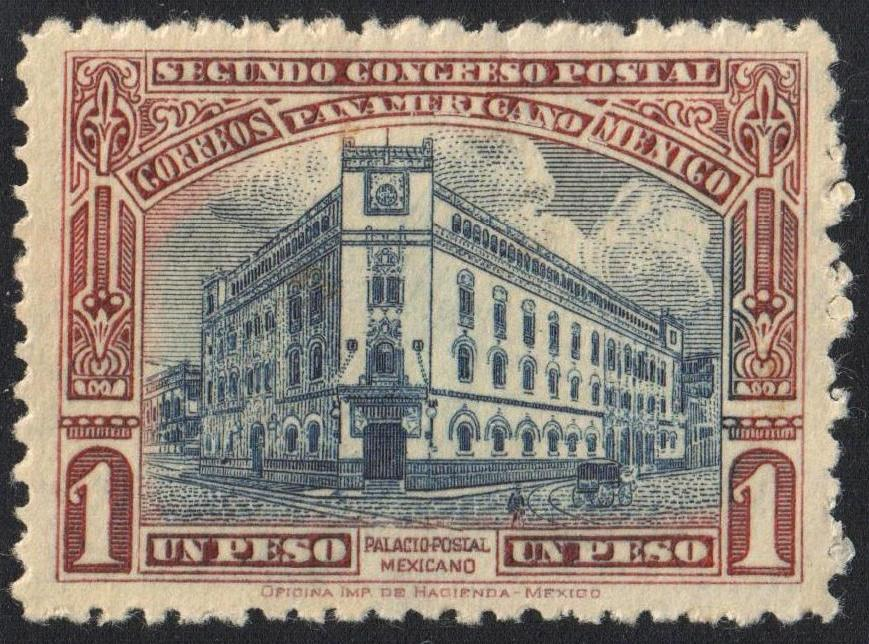
Palacio de Correos de Mexico

== Colonial period ==
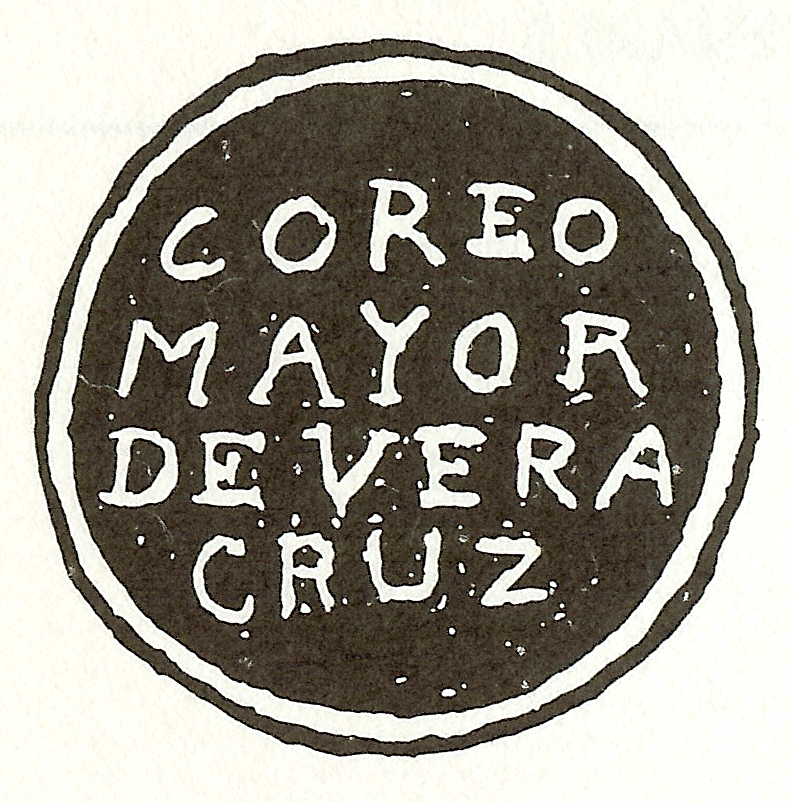
Earliest known postmark on dated letter, 1736

The postal system of Mexico may be said to have begun with the Aztecs, who operated a system of messengers; they worked well enough that Hernán Cortés continued using them after the 1521 conquest. After 1579, the right to operate the posts was farmed out to members of the nobility, who were known as "Correo Mayor de la Nueva España". The most important part of their operation was the route between Mexico City and Veracruz.

In 1742, the administrator of posts in Madrid was ordered to improve the Mexican system, resulting in the 1745 establishment of a weekly post between Mexico City and Oaxaca, followed in 1748 by a monthly service to Guatemala. In 1765 the Spanish crown bought back the rights to the postal service, effectively "nationalizing" the posts.

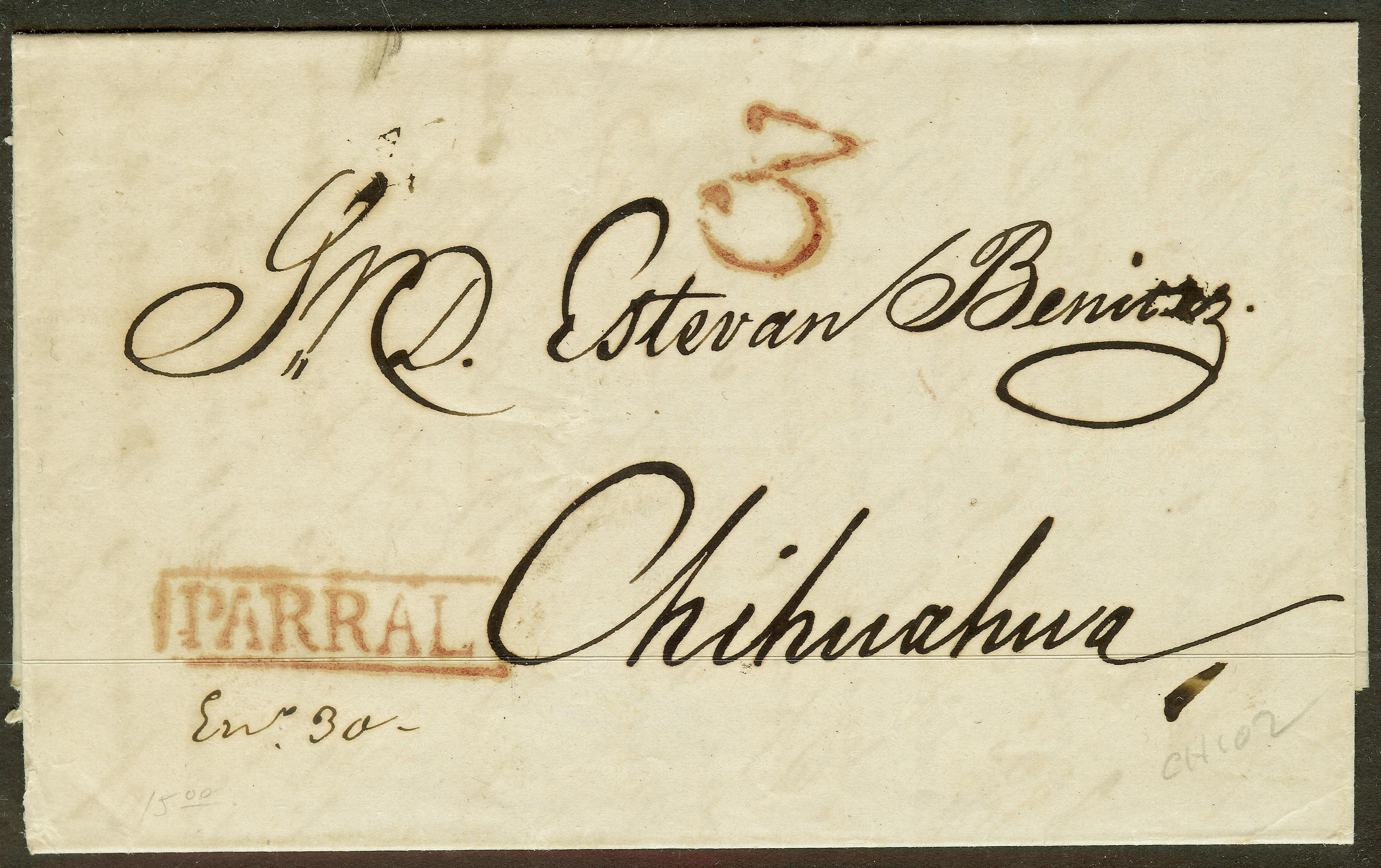
Stampless letter, rated 3 reales, mailed 1852 from Parral, State of Chihuahua to the City of Chihuahua

During the Colonial period and continuing up to the introduction of adhesive stamps, letters were typically sent collect, the postage to be paid by the recipient upon arrival. The covers, or envelopes in which the letters were sent, were stamped by hand with the name of the originating town, and typically with a number representing the charge for postage, e.g., "3" for 3 reales. Occasionally, mail was sent postage pre-paid, in which case the envelope would be marked "Franca" or "Franco" or "Franqueado." According to Yag & Bash (1965), some handstamps (on undated covers) date to the 1720s and the earliest known stamped postmark on a dated cover is a Veracruz mark from 1736. Yag and Bash researched the Chapman records, and found these numbers of post offices:

Year	Principal	Branch
1824	17	338
1846	45	440
1854	47	430
1868	47	431
1875	54	241

Most post offices, principal and branch, had handstamps.

Covers from the Colonial period up until the third quarter of the 1800s typically showed only the addressee's name and city; a street address was not written. These letters were not delivered to the addressee. Instead, the letters would be held at the local post office and advertised on posted lists or in newspapers. Many of the recipients were well known businessmen or politicians. Towards the end of the 19th century, larger cities employed postmen to deliver the mail.

== Independence and early republic ==
Mexico declared independence from Spain on September 16, 1810. This resulted in the long Mexican War of Independence which ended in 1821, and which eventually led to the creation of the short-lived First Mexican Empire. Agustín de Iturbide was the first and only emperor. Two years later, he was deposed by the republican forces. In 1824, a republican constitution was adopted, creating the United Mexican States with Guadalupe Victoria as its first President.

In the 1820s both the British and French began packet service to Veracruz. A British postal agent operated at Veracruz 1825–1874 and at Tampico from around 1840 to 1876. While both were supplied with British stamps, only the Tampico stamps were used (obliterator "C76"). The British service ran continuously until 1914, while French service ended in 1835, was restored in 1862 as the Ligne de Mexico and continued until 1939.

Next to the Mexican, British and French post offices and agents, Mexico had a good number of forwarding agents, most of which operated in the 19th century. Some towns and the agents therein as noted by Ken Rowe:

- Acapulco: Foster; Guys & Doty; P.M.S.S. Co.
- Guaymas: Robinson
- Matamoros: Erhard, Putnam & Co; Uhde & Co.
- Mazatlan: Copman & Lomer; Kennedy; Talbot, Parrot (US Consul); Scarborough & Co.; Smith & Mason
- Mexico City: Sengstack & Schutte; de Drusina & Co.
- Monterey: Bach Schonfeld Y Ca.
- Tampico: Baumbush, Magnus & Co.; Droege Y Ca.; Hohls, Muller & Co.; Montluc
- Vera Cruz: Braune, Busing & Co.; Hargous; Hoffman Y D'Oleire; Manning Basildon & Co.; Manning, Marshal & Co.; Martinez, Perret and Co.; Smith

== Classic stamp period 1856–1874 ==
Just as there is no consensus on what constitutes "classic stamps" in general, there is no agreement on what is the "classic period" for stamps of Mexico. In 1926, Samuel Chapman in his The Postage Stamps of Mexico, referred to the "provisional period" as running from 1856 to 1868. In 1983, Schatzkès & Schimmer published a study of the Cancellations of Mexico from 1856–1874, but they did not specifically call that the "classic period." Pulver in his Introduction to the Stamps of Mexico (1992) included a chapter entitled "Classic Era 1856–1883." Including 1883 as the end of the classic period apparently is based on the fact that the district overprints continued to that year. However, the only stamps Pulver actually discussed in his "classics" chapter were issued before 1874, which year marked a fundamental change in the appearance of Mexico's stamps. Others view the classic period as extending to 1900 or even later.

How to define the "classic" period thus necessarily is subjective. This article will treat the classic period as running from 1856 to 1874. Before 1874, most of the stamps were locally designed and produced, often with crude or "primitive" workmanship and imperforate or poorly perforated, characteristics that make the stamps charming and popular with philatelists. In May 1874, Mexico issued a group of stamps designed and printed by the American Bank Note Company in New York, which were professionally designed and printed using steel engraving, and issued with perforations. These stamps were closely similar in appearance to the contemporary stamps of other countries also manufactured by bank note companies in the United States. Subsequent issues of Mexico, although usually manufactured domestically, were in a similar "modern" style.

=== District overprints ===
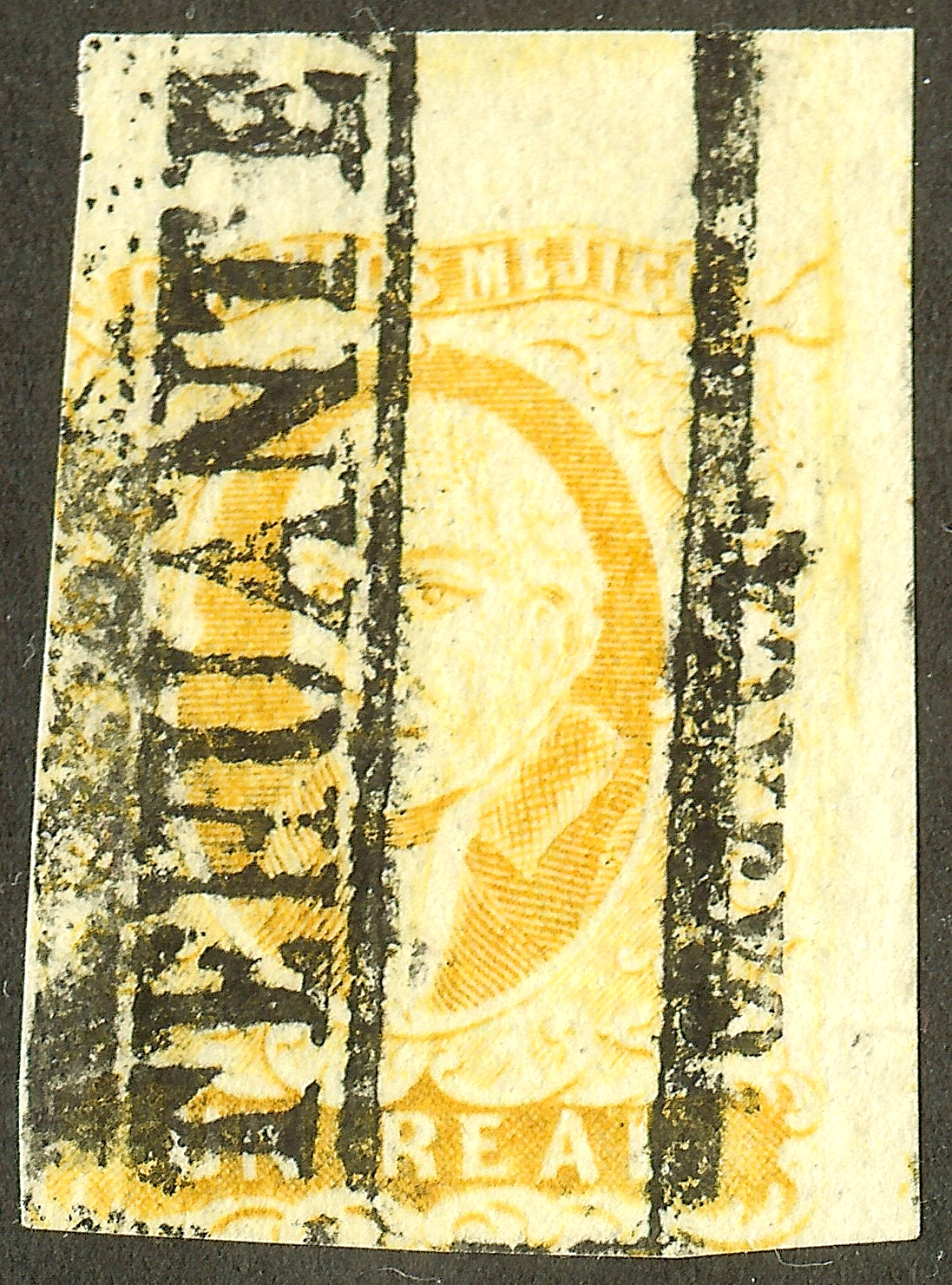
One real stamp, 1856, with "Oajaca" overprint and Tehuantepec cancellation

Virtually all the early stamps of Mexico have district overprints, which were added as an anti-theft device. These overprints came into use in 1856, with the first stamps of Mexico, and continued officially until the end of 1883.

The Mexican postal system divided the country into about 50 "districts", each of which had a main office and a number of suboffices. The district office ordered stamps from Mexico City, they would be shipped by stagecoach unoverprinted, and then the district office would handstamp each stamp with the name of the district. The overprinted stamps would then both be sold directly to postal customers, and shipped to suboffices.

In theory, only overprinted stamps were valid for postage, but given the error potential of applying the marking to each individual stamp, a small number of unoverprinted uses are known. Also, some offices failed to comply with orders and simply sold their stamps unoverprinted.

In 1864, the system was refined by shipping the stamps from Mexico City with an invoice number and year already overprinted.

Sometimes the district office's overprint included a number designating the suboffice for which the stamps were intended, and occasionally suboffices applied their own handstamps. Larger offices had several different designs of handstamp in use; Mexico City used five different devices to handstamp the stamps of 1856, each with a different appearance, while the districts of Guadalajara, Guanajuato, Puebla, Querétaro, and San Luis Potosí each had three devices.

The color of the district name was almost always black, but red, blue, and violet overprints are known. For a period in 1858, the postmaster of Zacatecas, who had fled the city for Aguascalientes to escape the fighting during the Reform War, but had left his handstamp, wrote in "Zacatecas" by hand.

For many years, philatelists were mystified by the overprints, until Samuel Chapman, a British businessman living in Mexico, took an interest and researched the postal archives. His 1926 book, since reprinted, includes extensive detail on the shipments to the various districts.

Many of the overprints are rare, and command high prices among specialists in Mexican stamps. They have also been forged.

=== Postal cancellations ===
After stamps were introduced in 1856, some post offices created new cancellation marks, while others used their existing handstamps bearing the name of the town for years to cancel the new stamps, so that very old handstamps can be found on stamped covers.

=== Postage stamps ===
==== Hidalgo issues 1856 and 1861 ====
President Don Ignacio Comonfort, authorized the prepayment of postage using adhesive stamps by decree of February 21, 1856. New regulations were drawn up and were supposed to be published on July 15, but problems with the engraving delayed this until July 31. On August 1, 1856, Mexico issued its first postage stamps. The design, a portrait of Miguel Hidalgo y Costilla, the parish priest who led an unsuccessful bid for Mexican independence in 1810, reflected the reform politics of the Comonfort government. The stamps were somewhat crudely engraved and imperforate. Five values were issued from 1856 to 1859: ½ real, 1r, 2r, 4r, and 8r. The stamps usually, but not always, had district overprints with the name of the district post office.

Quantities produced according to Follansbee:

- ½ real blue – 825,573
- 1 real yellow – 1,425,275
- 2 reales green – 1,629,773
- 4 reales red – 157,189
- 8 reales violet – 100,784
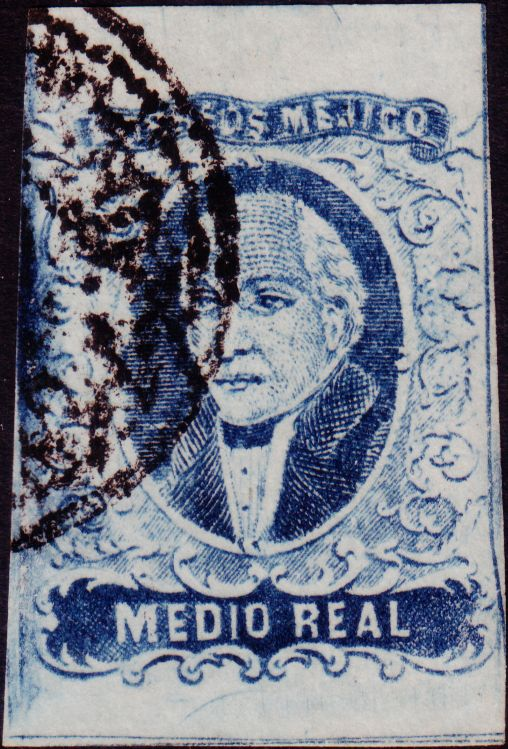
Mexico's first stamp, medio real, 1856

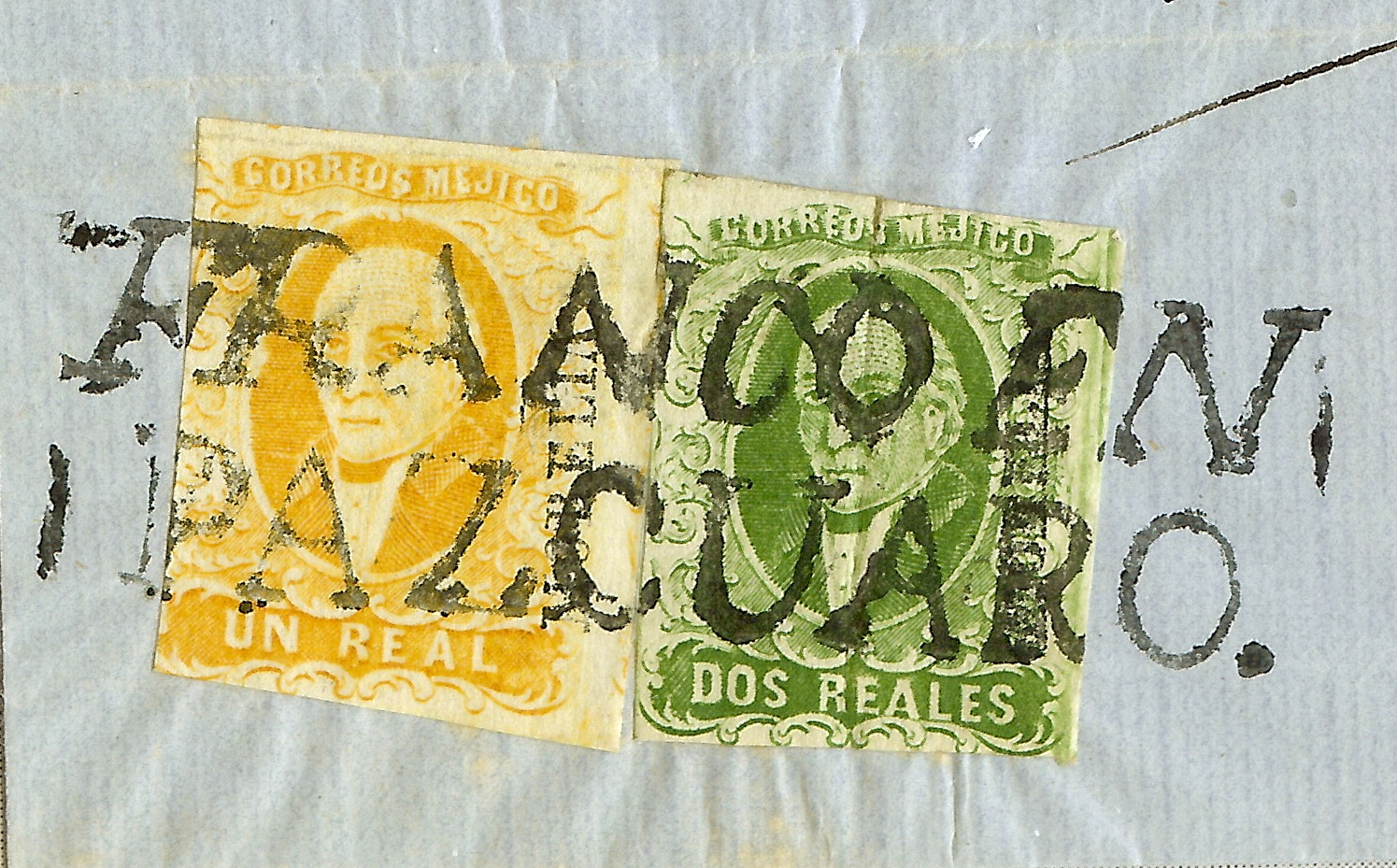
Un real and dos reales 1856, with Morelia overprints and Pátzcuaro postmark

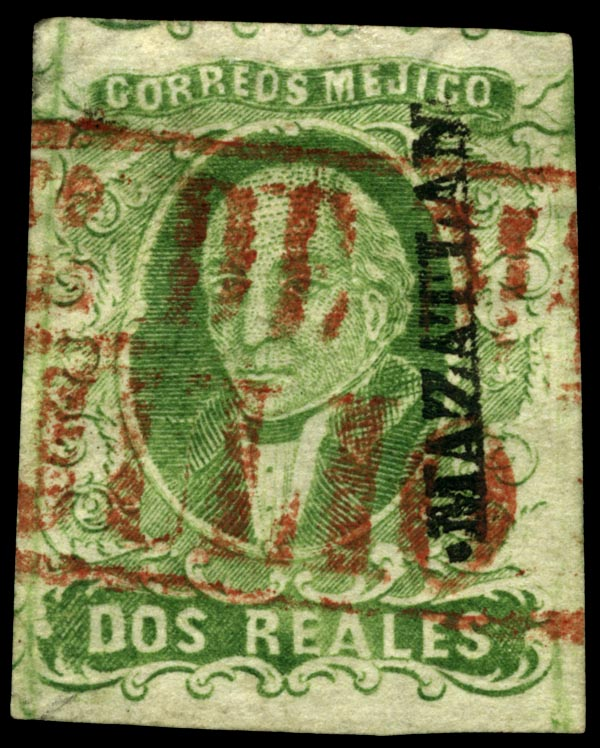
Dos reales 1856, Mazatlán district

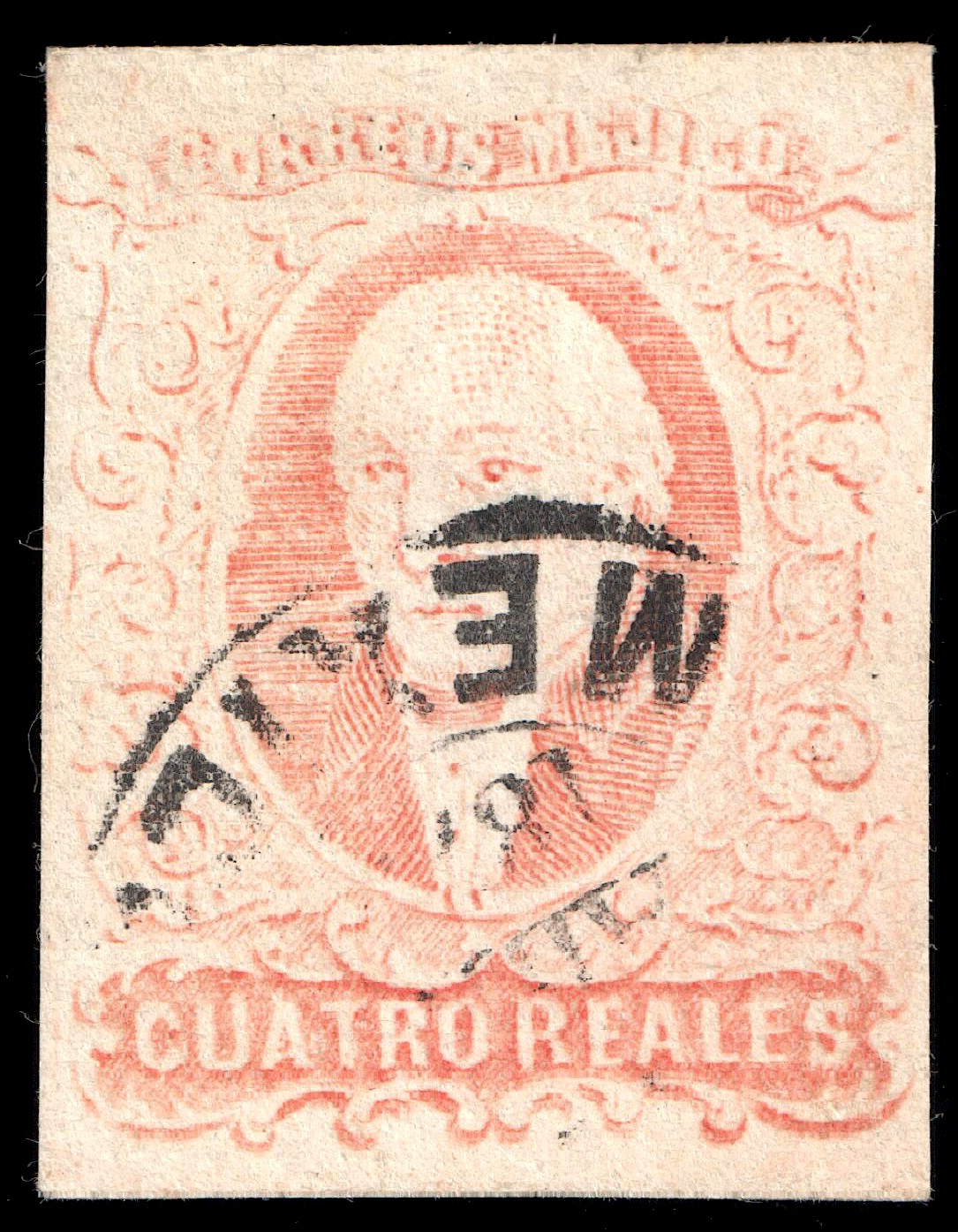
Quatro reales 1856 without district overprint

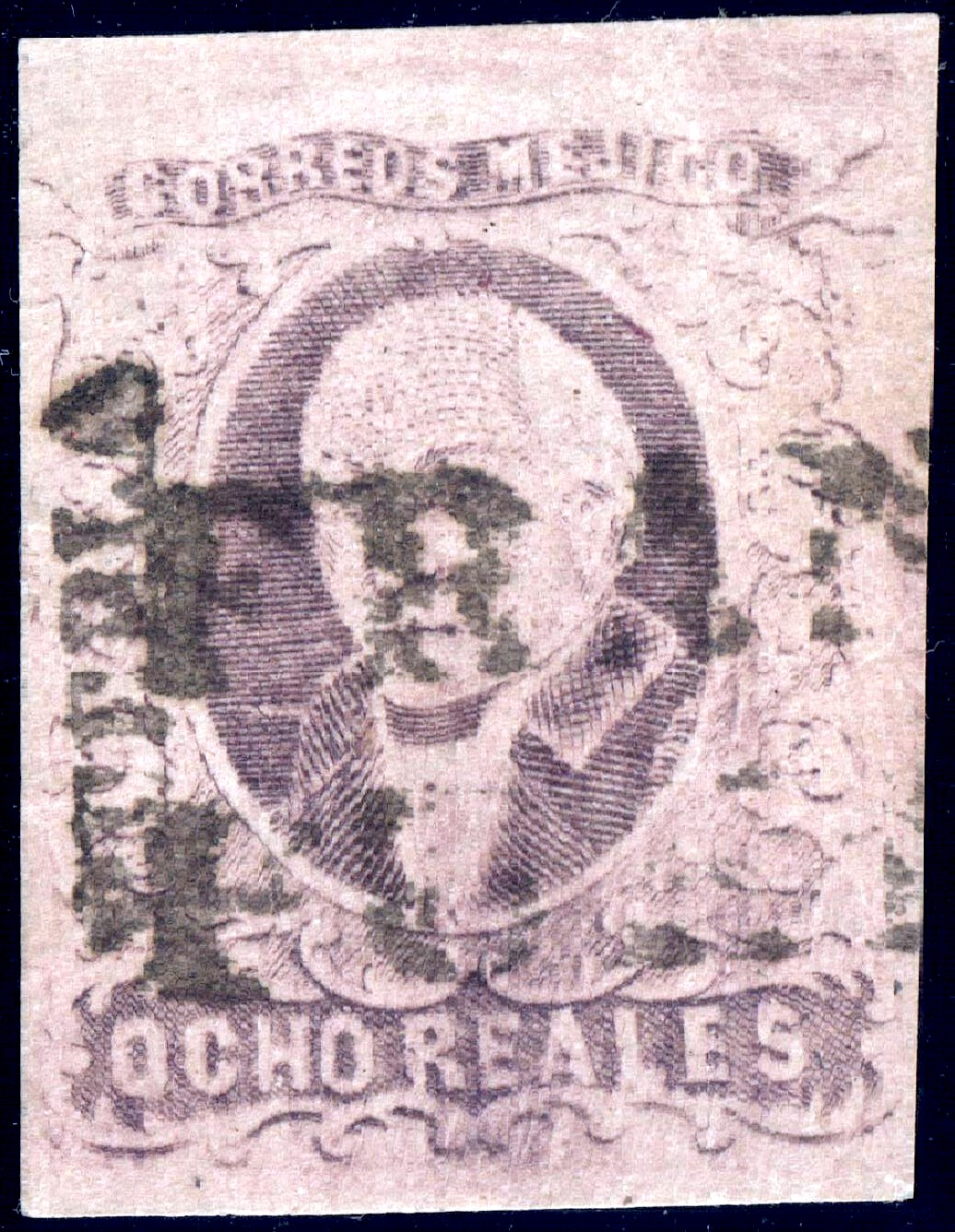
Ocho reales 1856, Puebla district and postmark

In 1861 the stamps were reissued in new colors on variously colored paper. As in the first issue they were issued both with and without district overprints, but in lower numbers.

Quantities produced according to Follansbee:

- ½ real black on buff – 194,280
- 1 real black on green – 821,116
- 2 reales black on pink – 925,573
- 4 reales red on yellow, orange – 103,675
- 8 reales black on red brown – 62,762

A study of the 1856 and 1861 issues, with information on the district overprints from Chapman's book is on Jesper Andersen's site. More examples of the 1856 and 1861 issues, including covers, may be seen on the Asian Philatelist website. Another collection of the 1861 issue is on the Stamps of Mexico site

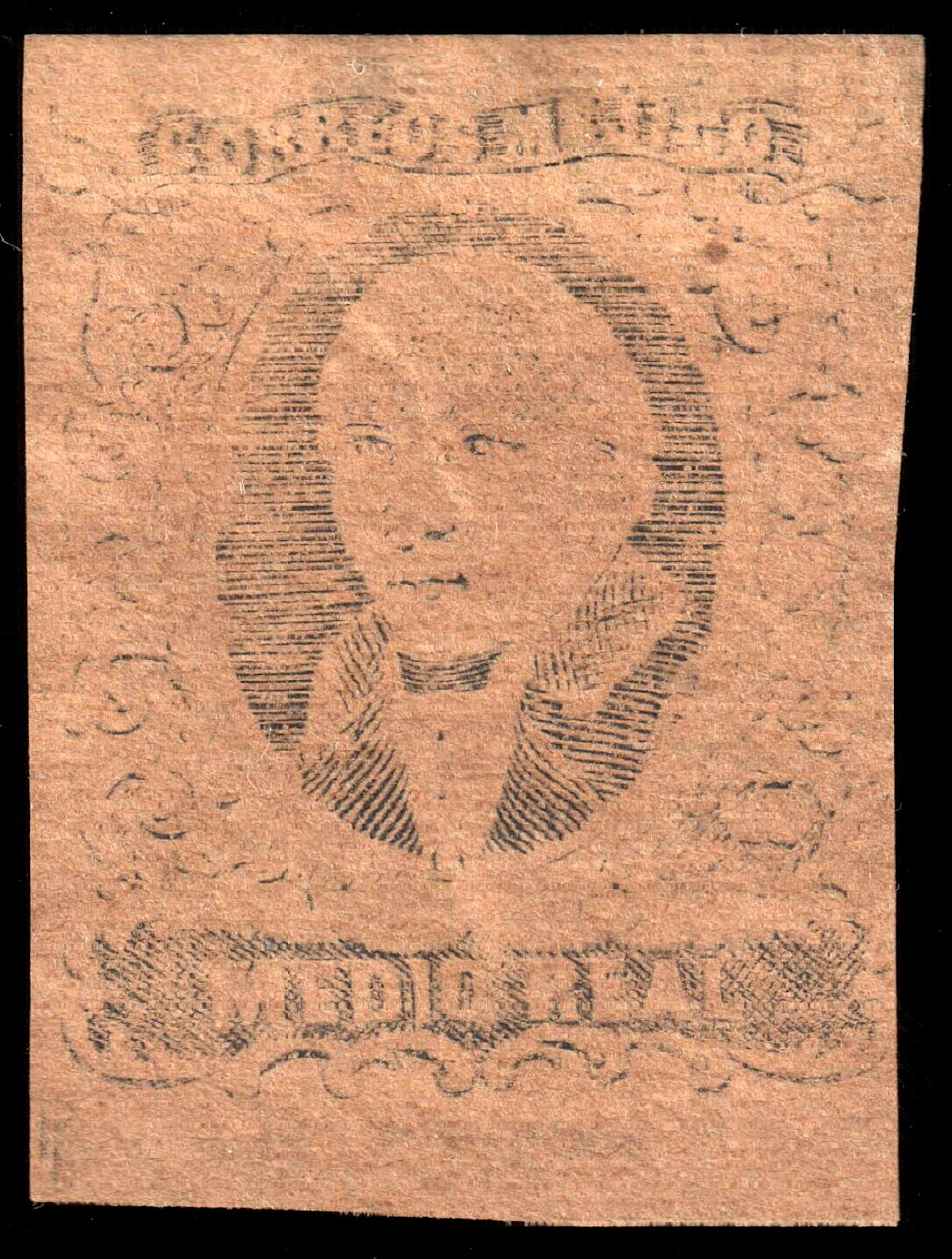
Medio real 1861 unused

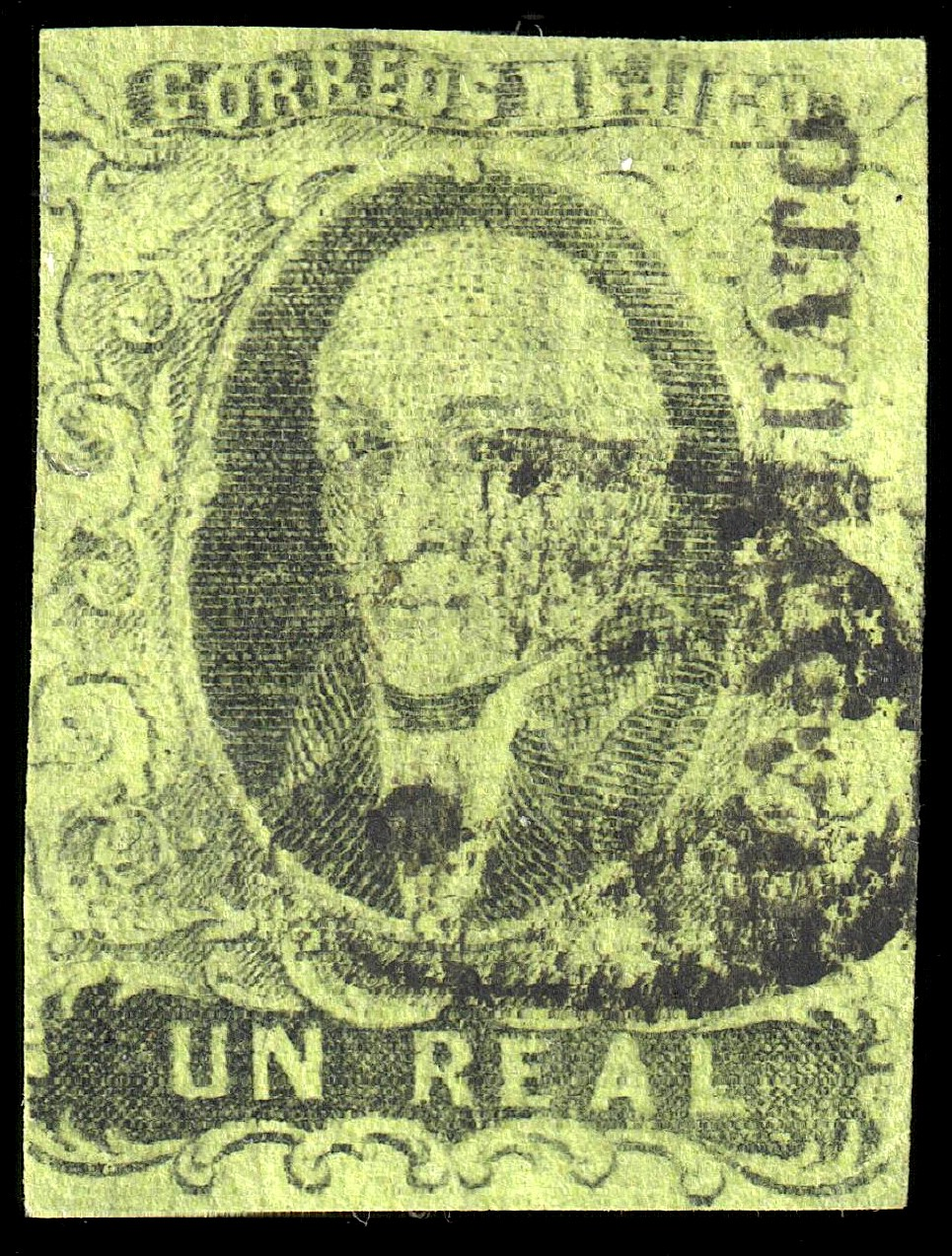
Un real 1861

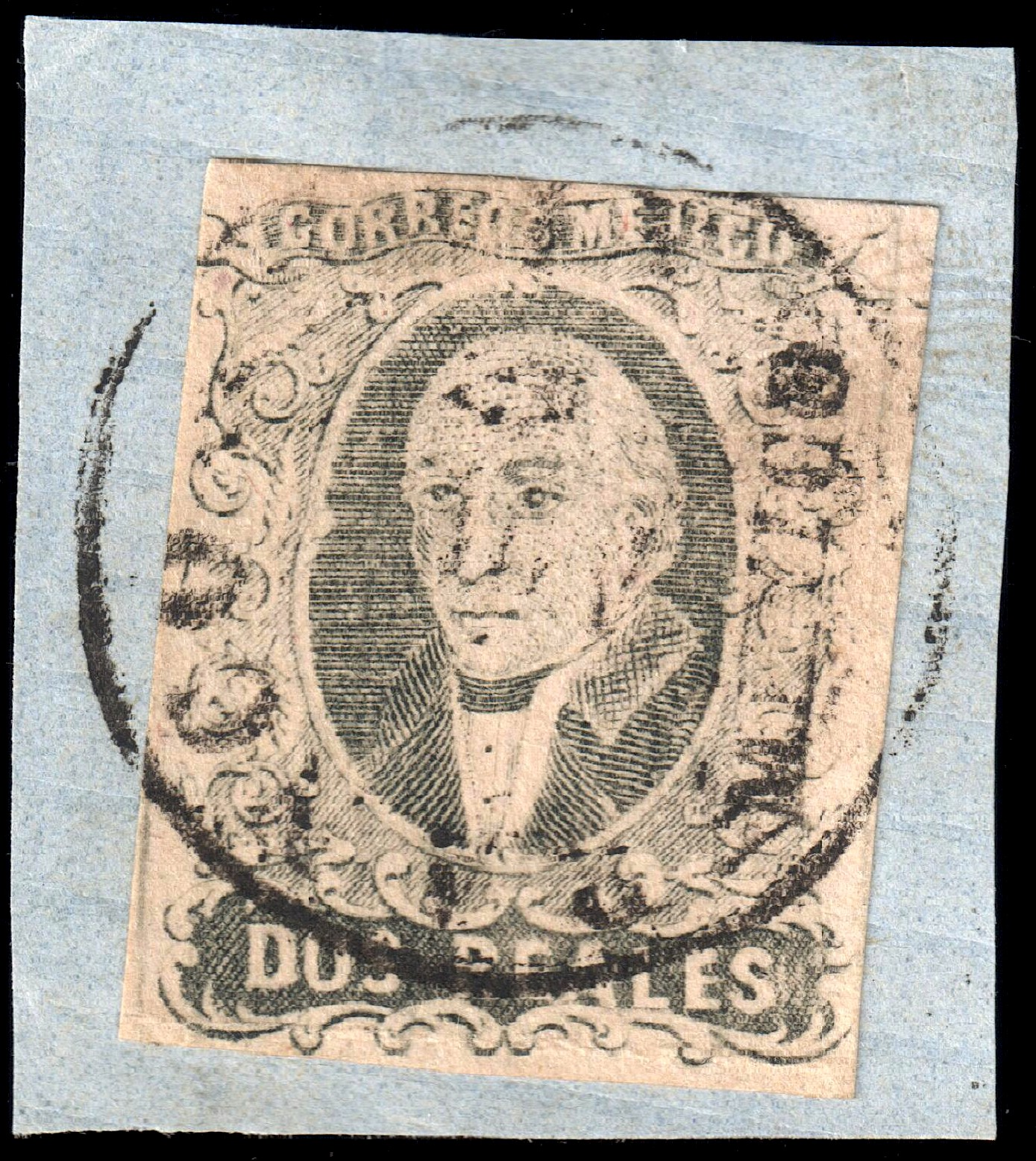
Dos reales 1861

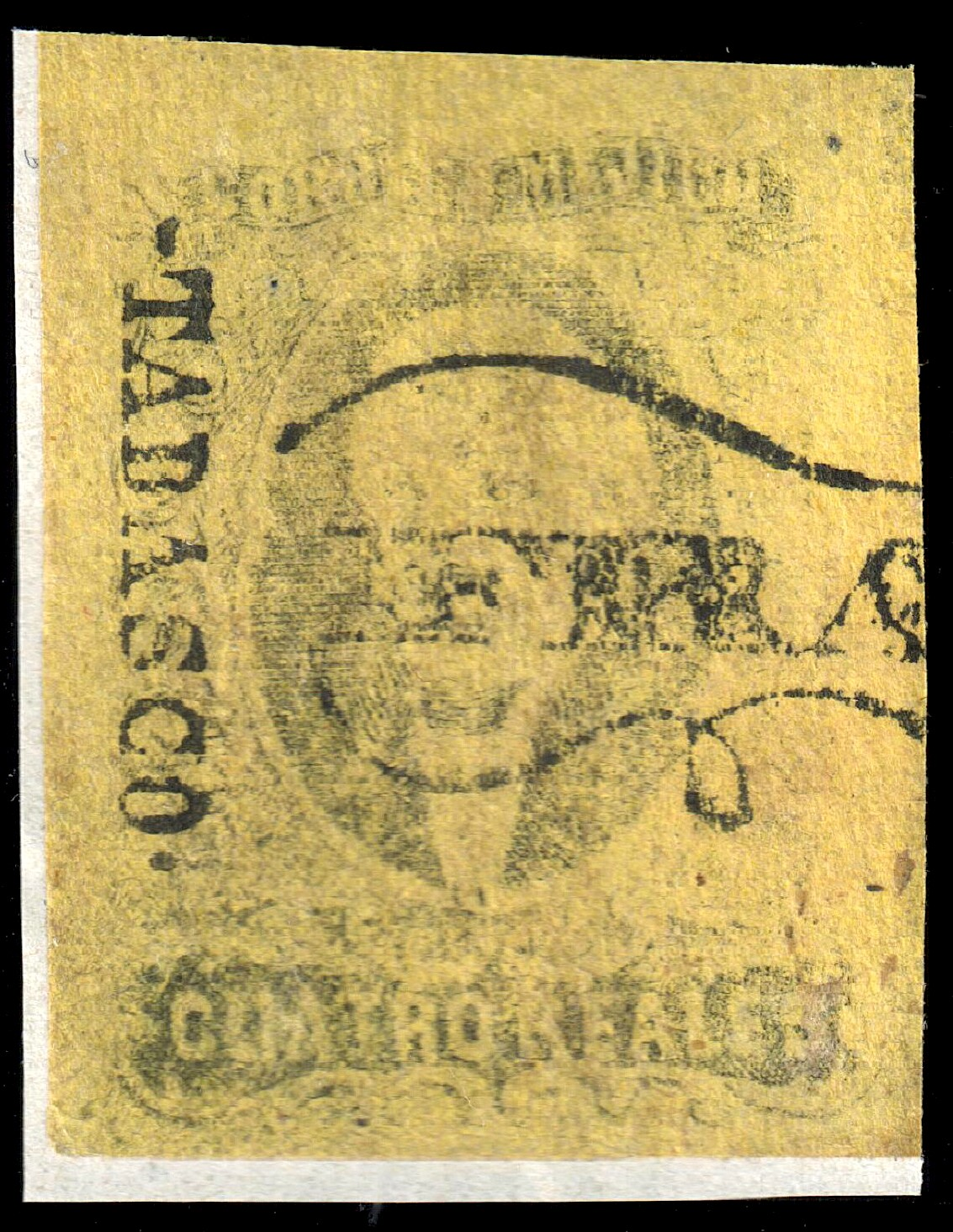
Quatro reales 1861, Tabasco district

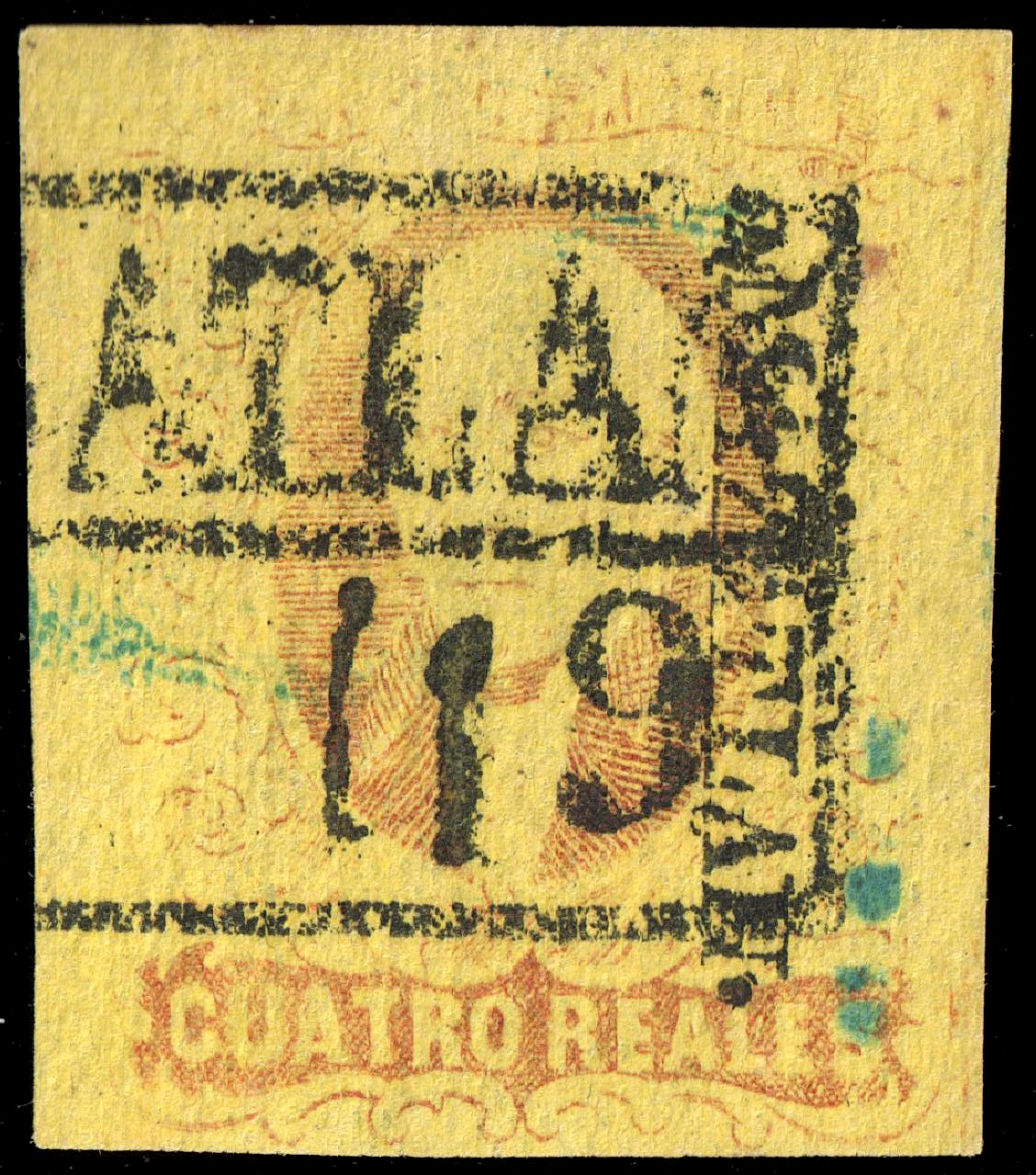
Quatro reales 1861, Mazatlan district and postmark

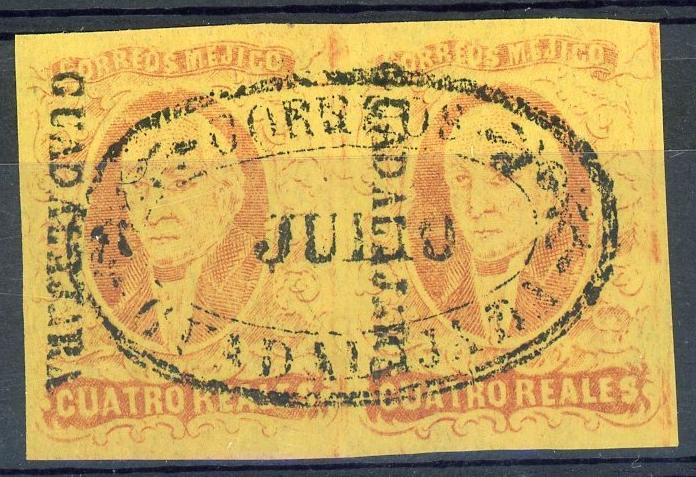
Quatro reales 1861, Guadalajara district and postmark

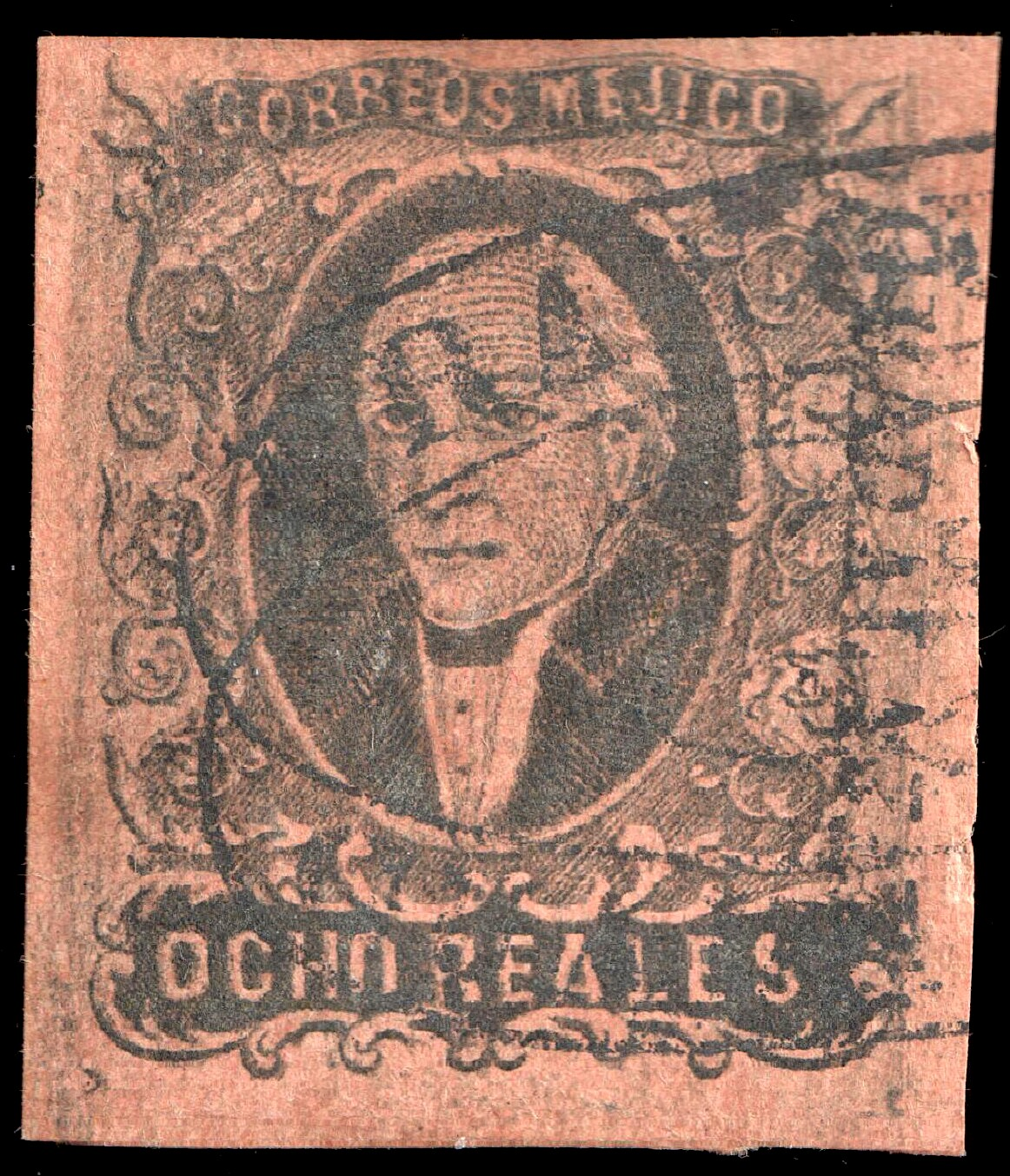
Ocho reales 1861, Guadalajara district

==== "Juárez" issue 1864 ====
In 1864, Mexico issued with a stamp with a finely engraved image of Hidalgo. These stamps were printed by the American Bank Note Company in New York by order of President Juárez. The stamps were perforated and issued in four values: 1r, 2r, 4r and 1 peso, and were issued both with and without district overprints. Although they were intended for general use, they were soon replaced by the first issue of the Second Mexican Empire (see below) and are known to have been used only in Monterrey and Saltillo. Used copies are rare and expensive.

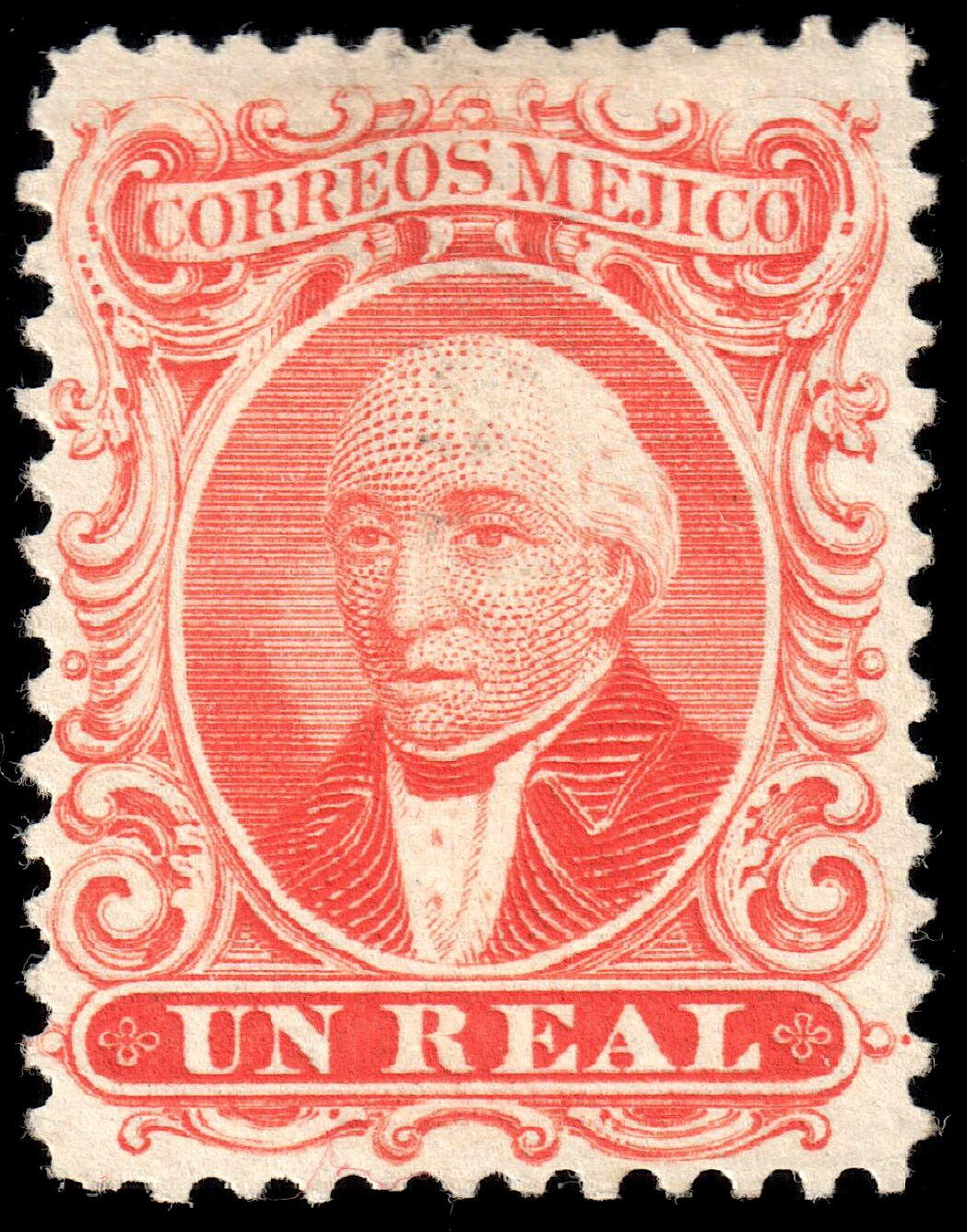
Un real

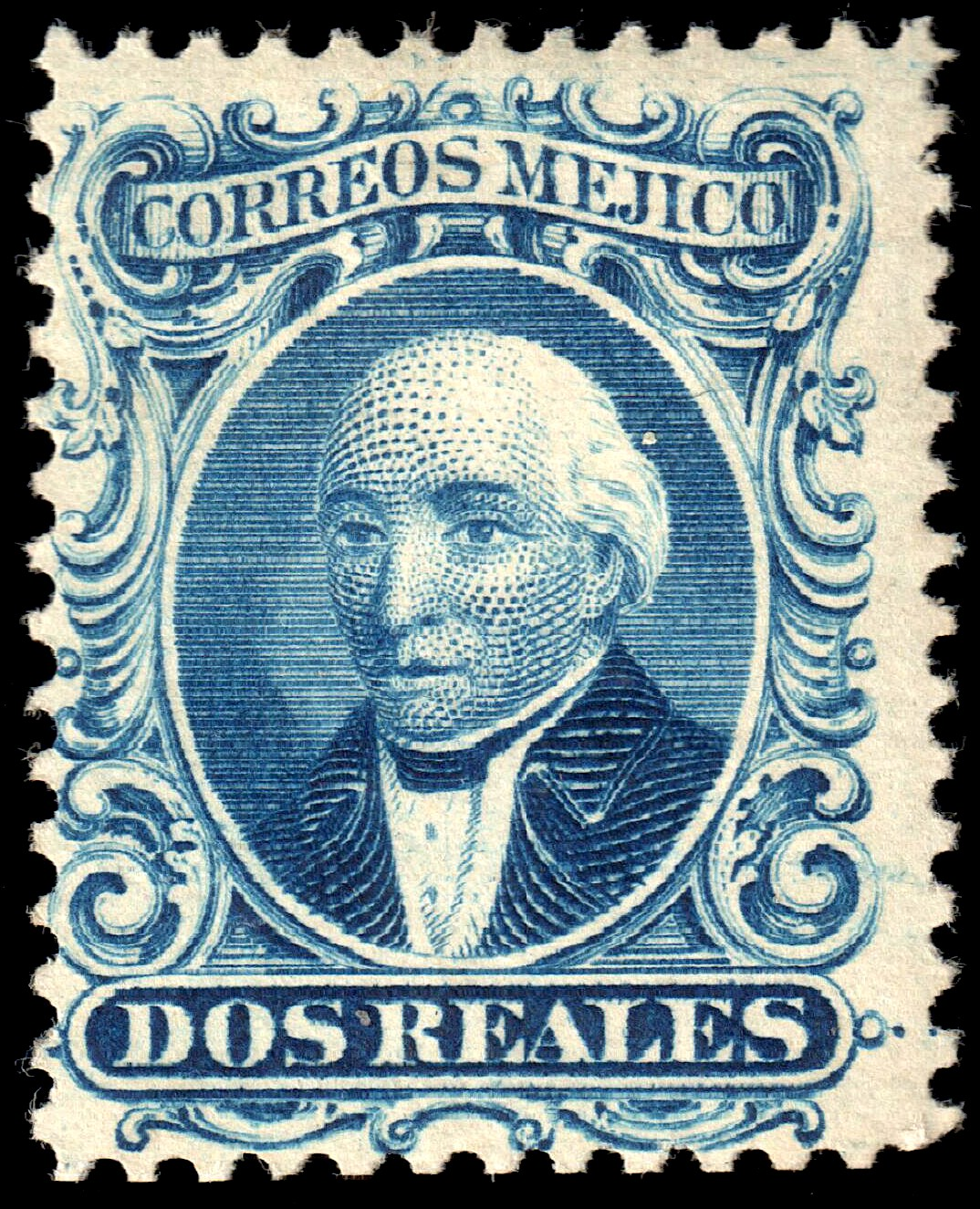
Dos reales

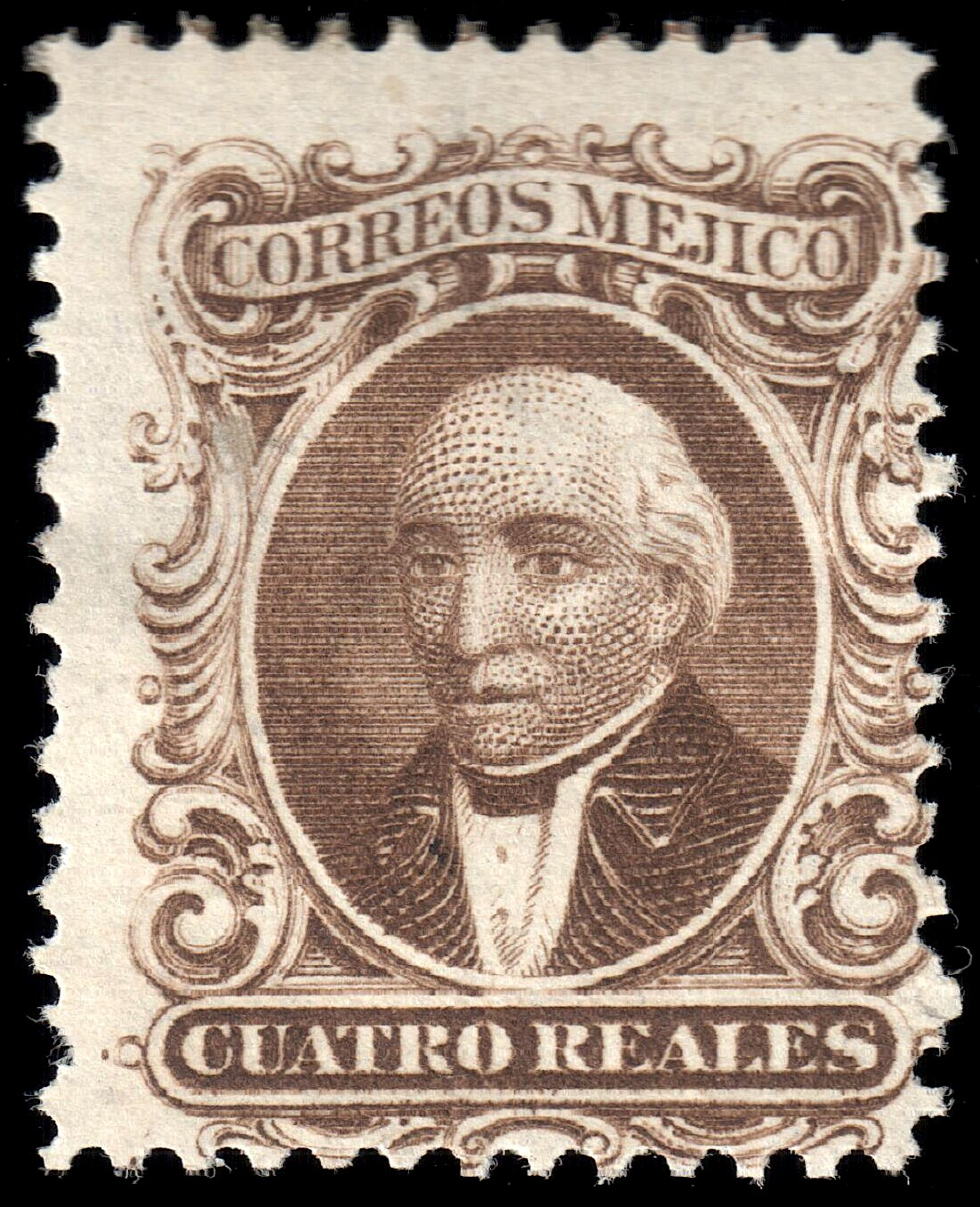
Quatro reales

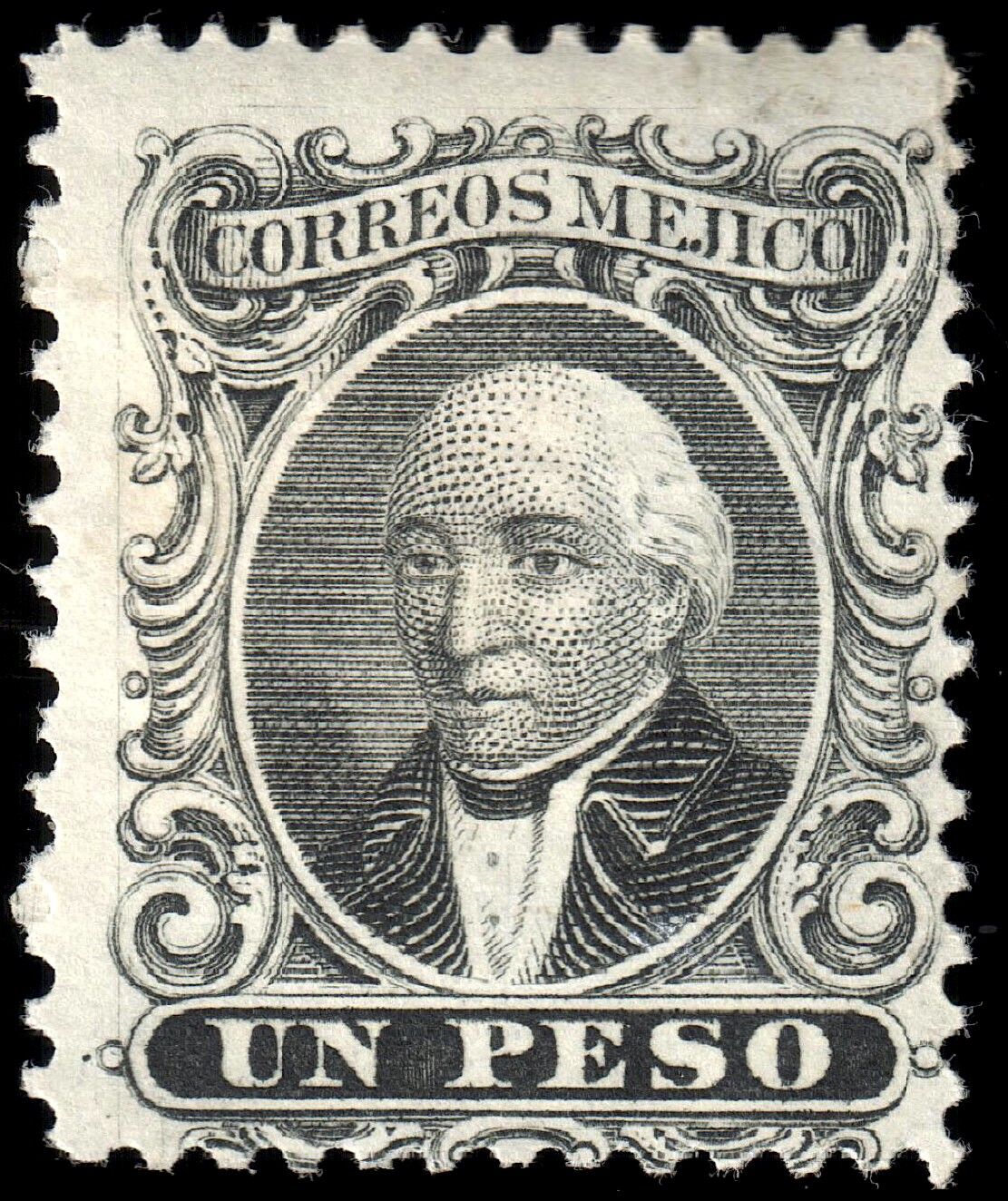
Un peso

=== Second Mexican Empire ===
Between 6 January and 8 January 1862, French troops invaded Mexico, supported by Mexican monarchists, many of whom were part of the nobility, ultimately capturing Mexico City on 10 July 1863. The French proclaimed a Catholic Empire in Mexico and installed Maximilian I of Mexico as Emperor of the Second Mexican Empire. Maximilian arrived in Mexico on 28 May or 29 May 1864 with his consort, Charlotte of Belgium. Republican forces continued their opposition and the French ultimately evacuated Mexico City on 5 February 1867. Maximilian was captured in Querétaro on 15 May 1867 and executed on 19 June 1867. The republic was restored, President Juárez returned to power, and the 1857 Constitution reinstated as the supreme law of the nation.

==== Eagle issue 1864 ====
On 15 May 1864, the regency replaced the existing stamps with the Eagle stamps depicting the Coat of arms of Mexico, an eagle killing a snake. A crown was added to the eagle to indicate the monarchy and the spelling was changed from "Mejico" to "Mexico." The stamps were engraved and issued imperforate. Five values were initially issued; 1/2r, 1r, 2r, 4r and 8r, to which a 3c. was added in 1865. The stamps were shipped from Mexico City to the district offices where the district name usually would be added to validate the stamps. Starting in July 1864, the stamps were overprinted with the year and an invoice number prior to shipment to the districts. The various overprints were made in different sizes and based on such variations, specialists have distinguished five separate issues, referred to as "1st" through "5th" period eagles. This issue is very popular with collectors and detailed studies have been made of the issue, including information obtained from surviving postal records.

- Another study of the Eagle stamps is on Jesper Andersen's site.
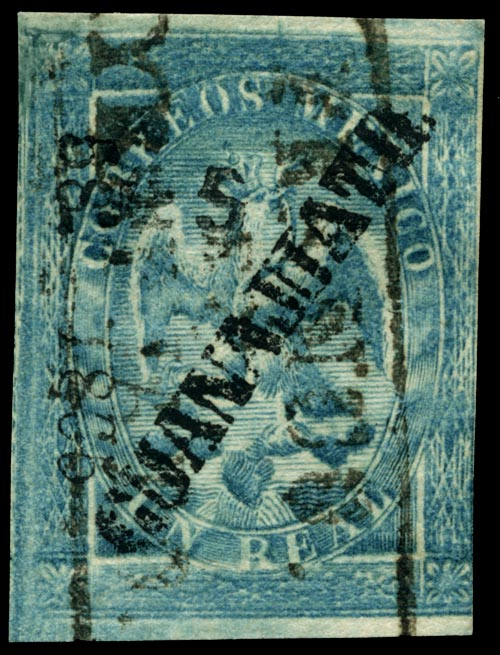
Un real 1864, Guanajuato district

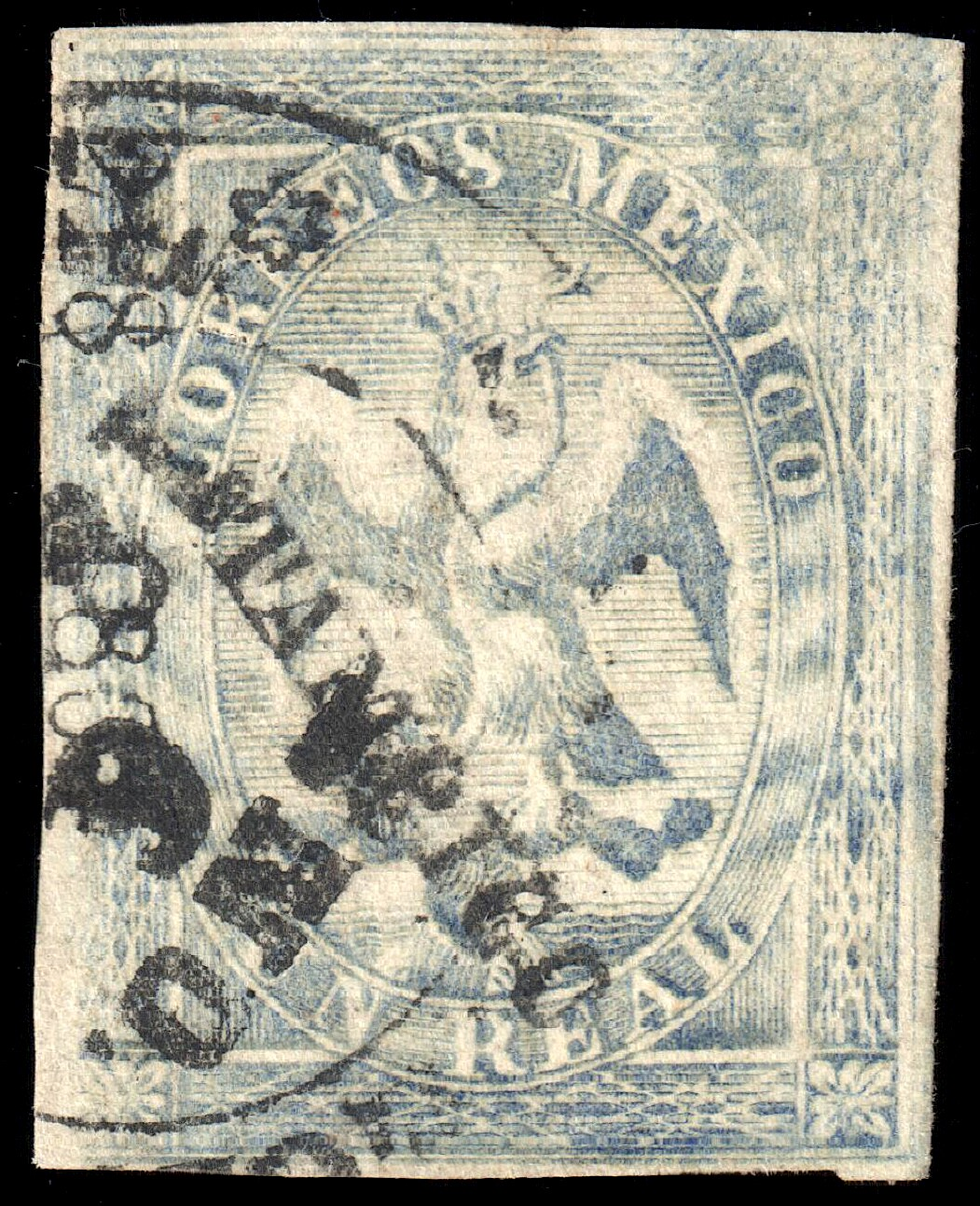
Un real 1864, Tampico district

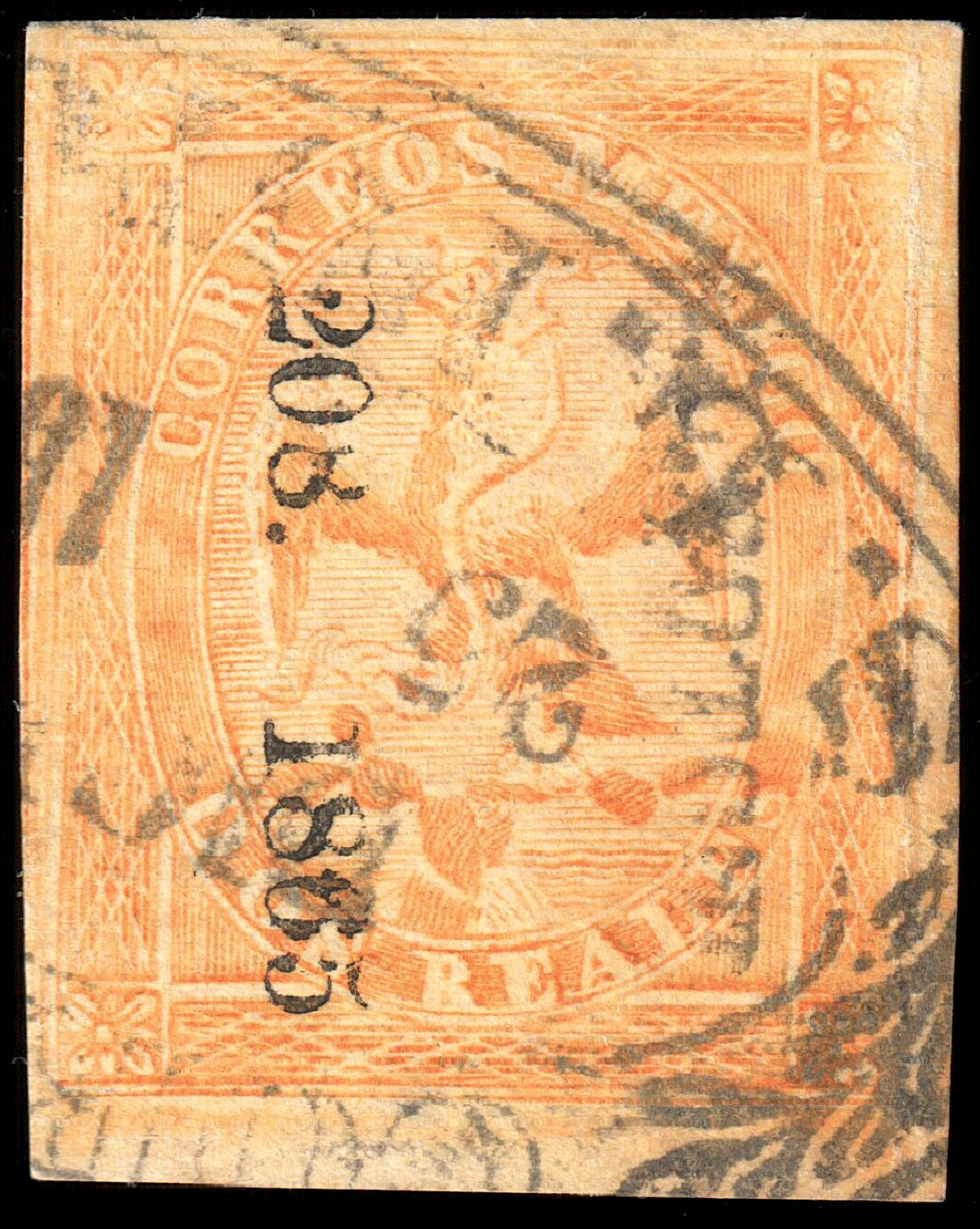
Dos reales 1865, San Luis Potosí district

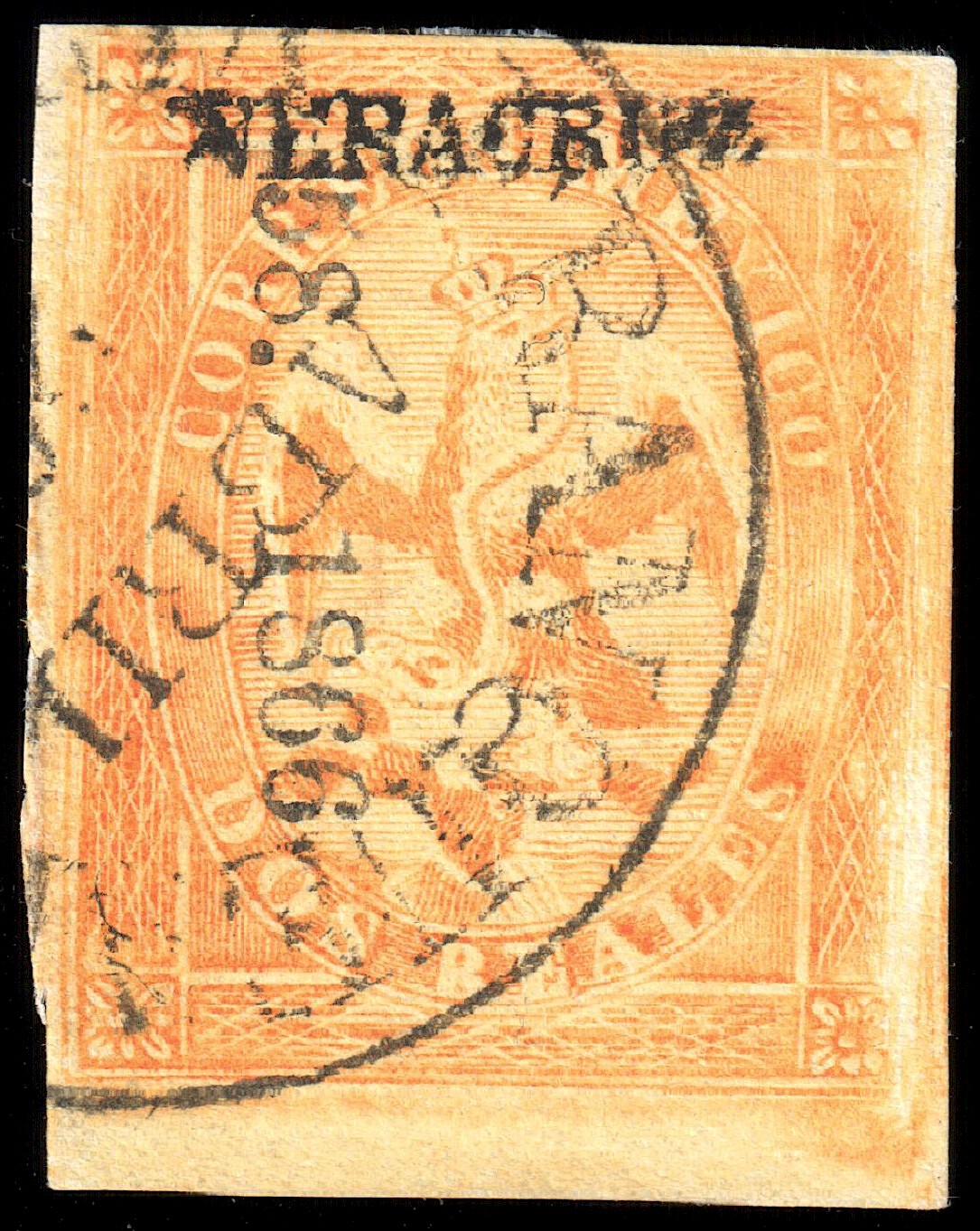
Dos reales 1866, Veracruz district

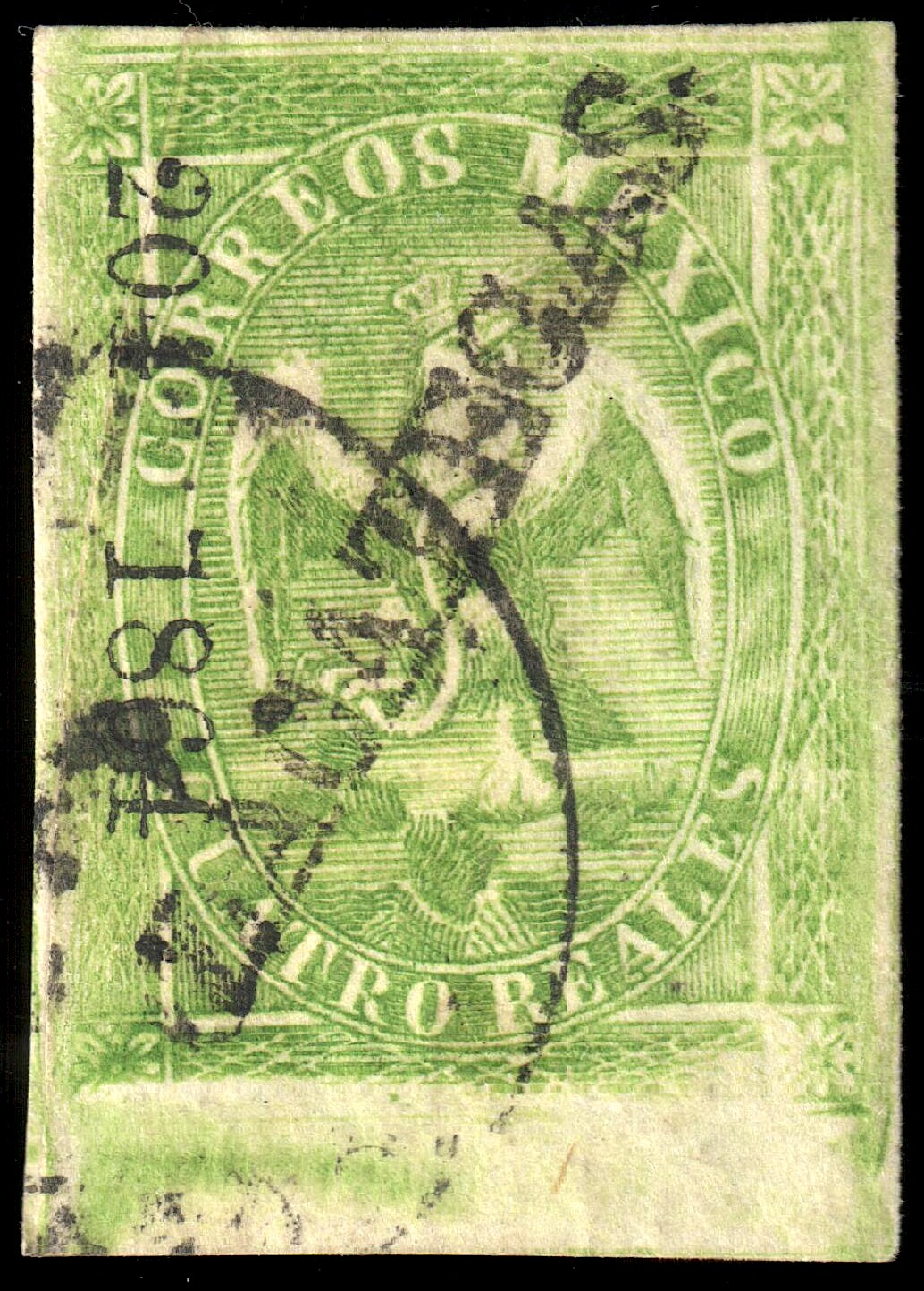
Quatro reales 1864, Zacatecas district

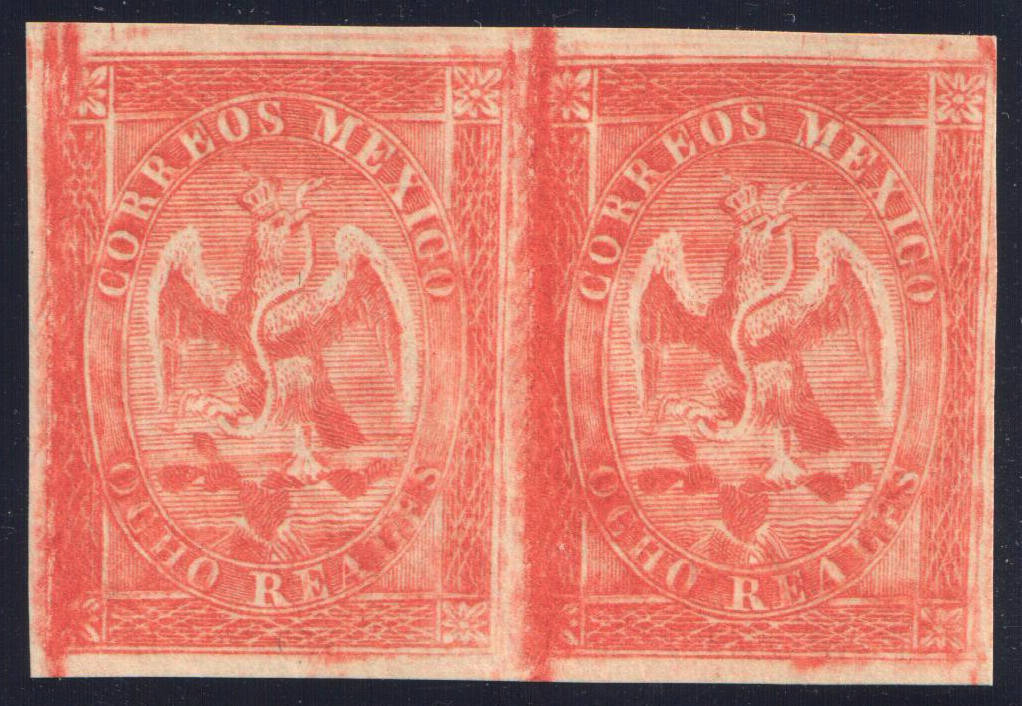
Ocho reales unused pair, without district overprint

==== Maximilian issue 1866 ====
On 1 August 1866 the regency issued a new set of stamps depicting a profile bust of Emperor Maximilian. This issue was lithographed, rather poorly, and issued imperforate. The regency had previously changed the official currency under which one peso equaled 8 reales to a decimal system in which one peso equaled 100 centavos. In making the conversion postal rates were rounded up, for example, the rate of one real being equal to 12.5 centavos was rounded up to 13 centavos. The stamps, as a result, were issued in values of 7c, 13c, 25c, and 50c. These stamps were issued with the year and invoice number and with or without the district name, but some issued in exchange for Eagle stamps were issued only with the Mexico City district name.

On 16 October 1866, the lithographed Maximilians were replaced with a finely engraved version of the same design and values. These were issued imperforate and with year and invoice number, with or without district name. Stamps without overprint are unissued remainders.

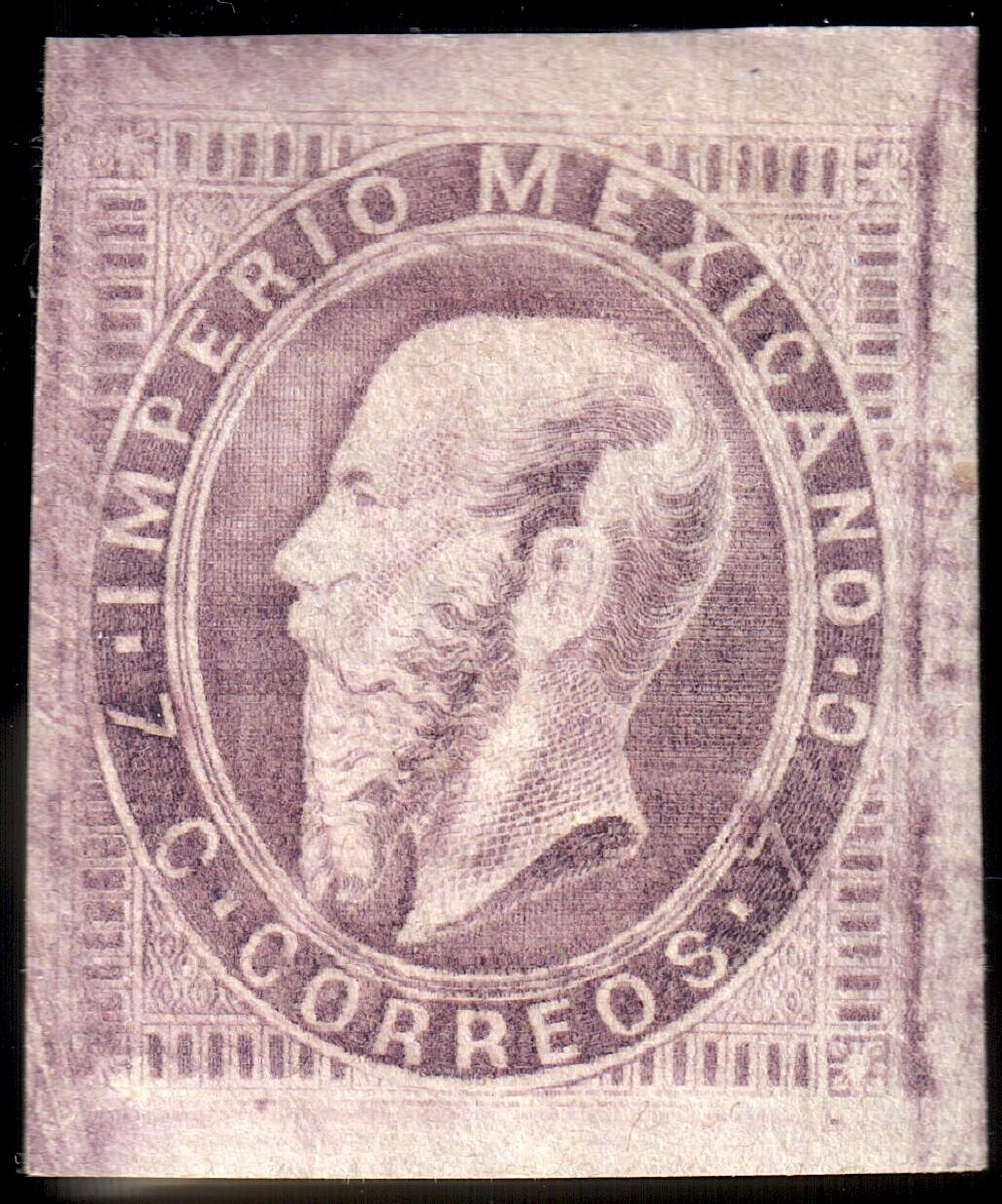
7c unused engraved

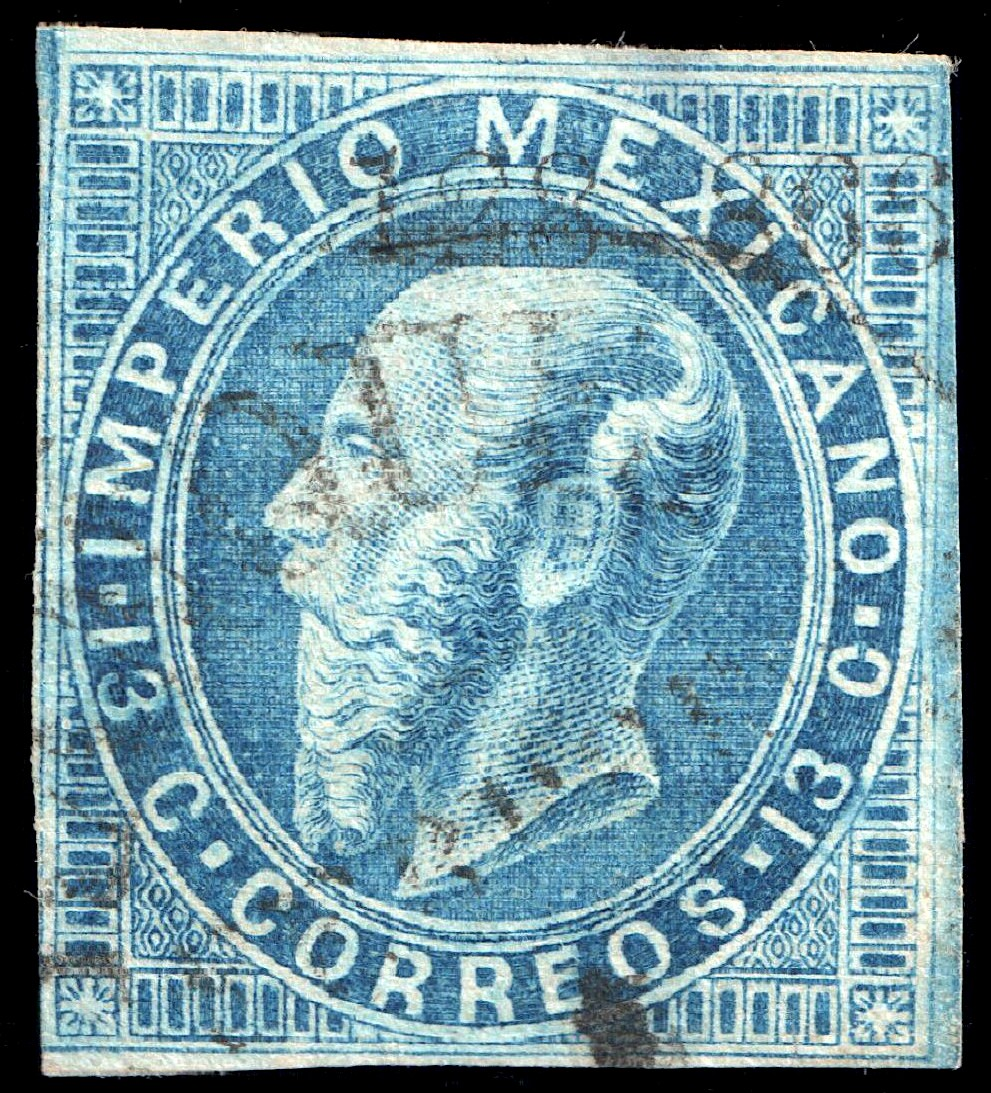
13c used engraved

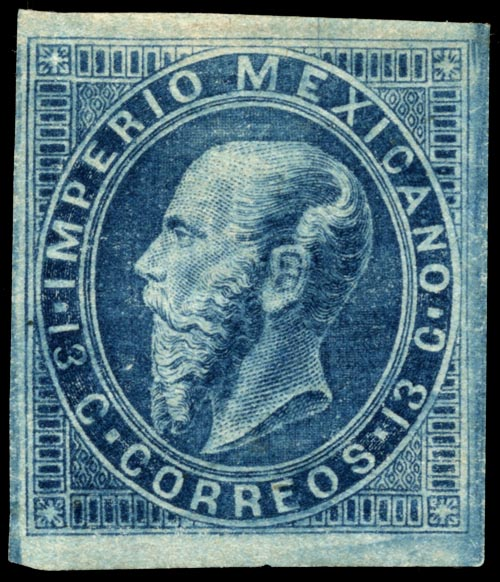
13c unused engraved

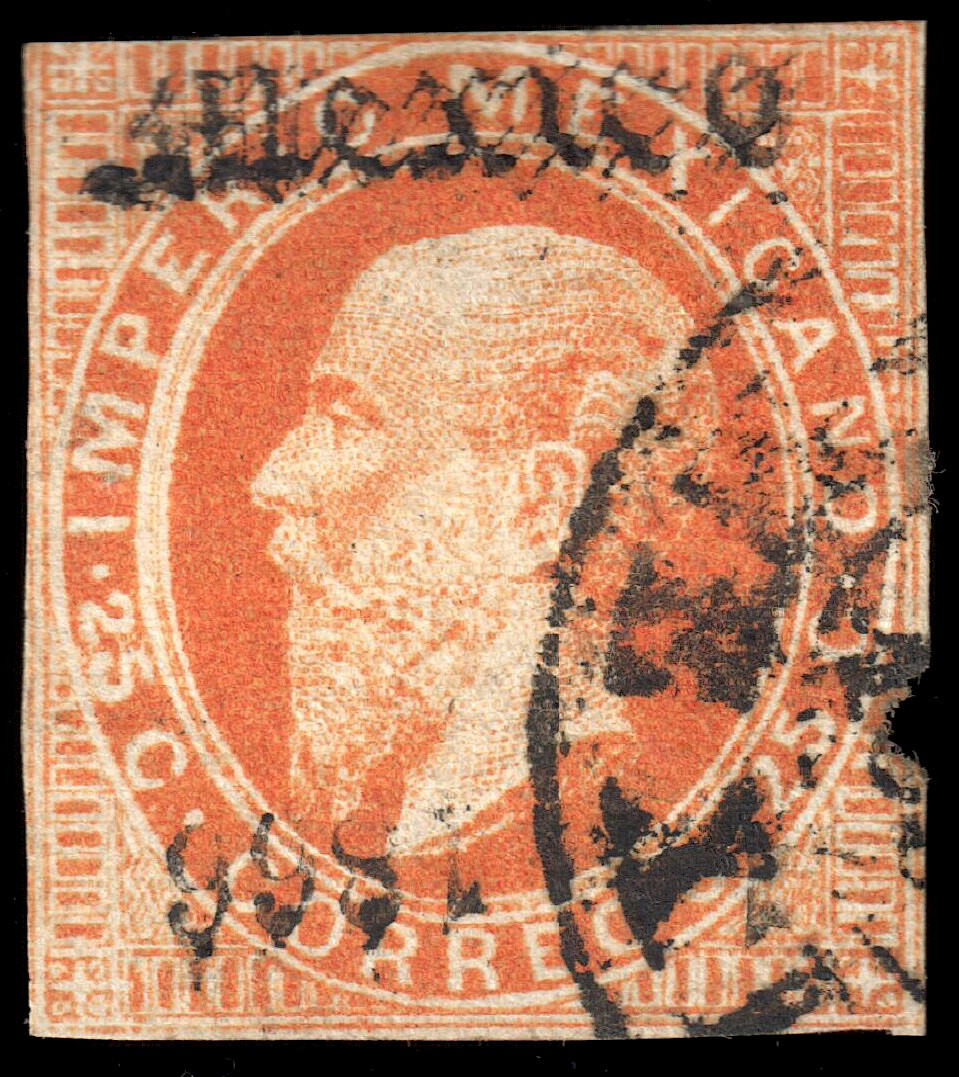
25c used lithographed

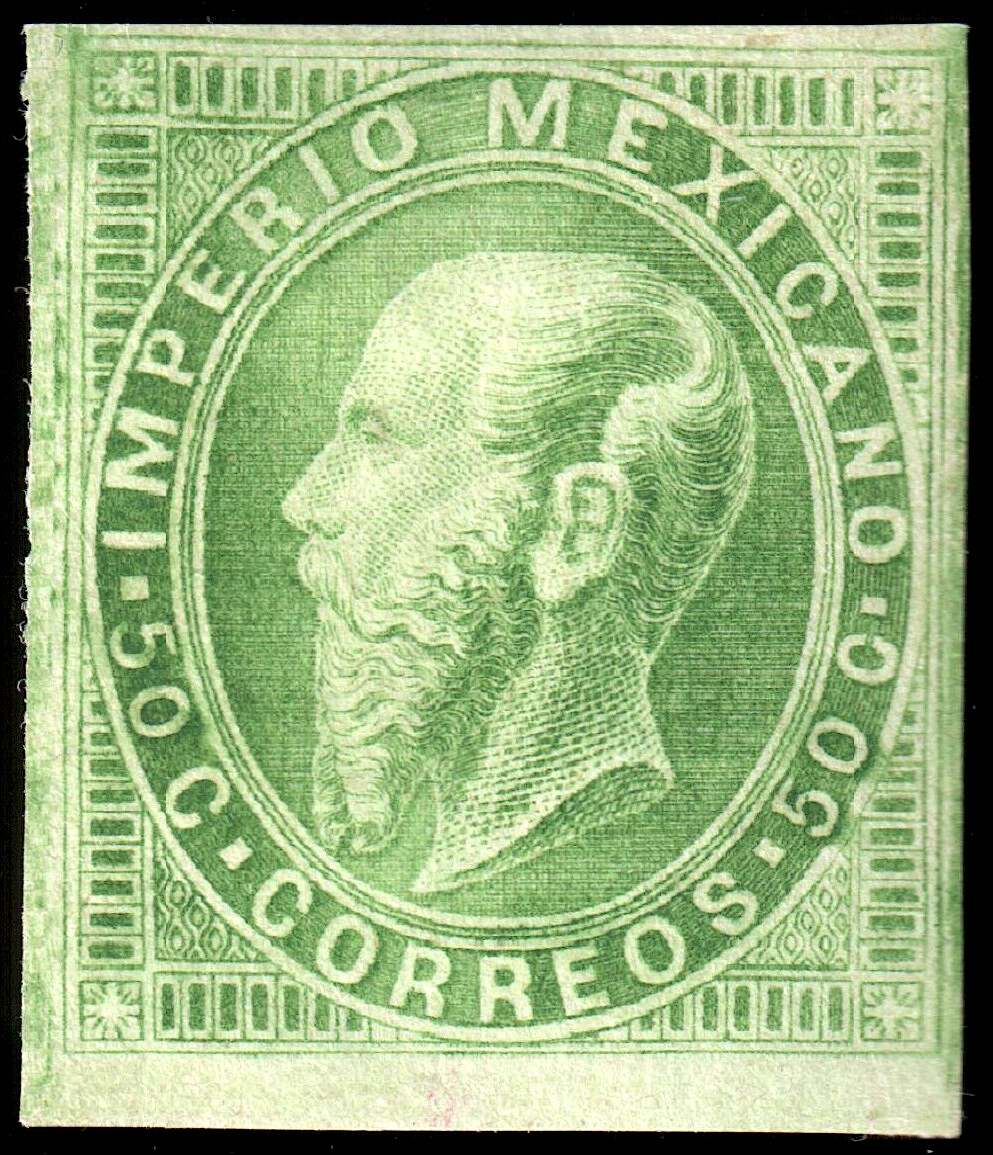
50c unused engraved

==== Sellos negro ====
Maximilian's Empire was never in control of the entire country and was in constant battle with Republican forces led by the ousted president Benito Juárez. Juárez eventually set up a government in exile in Chihuahua. Parts of the country not in control of the regency would not use stamps bearing Maximilian's image and issued a few provisional stamps. More commonly those areas reverted to using pre-stamp postal markings with "franco" stamps. These stampless covers issued after the advent of adhesive stamps are known to philatelists of Mexico as "Sellos Negro", or "Black (hand)stamps".

=== Republic restored ===
In June and July 1867, Maximilian's Empire was defeated and the Republic restored with Benito Juárez resuming the presidency. As a provisional measure, remainders of the 1861 Hidalgo issue were overprinted with "Mexico" handstamped in Gothic letters. Gothic overprints also were added to new printings of the 2 and 4 reales stamps. Some of these stamps are extremely rare and expensive.

==== Hidalgo issue 1868 & "Anotado" 1872 ====
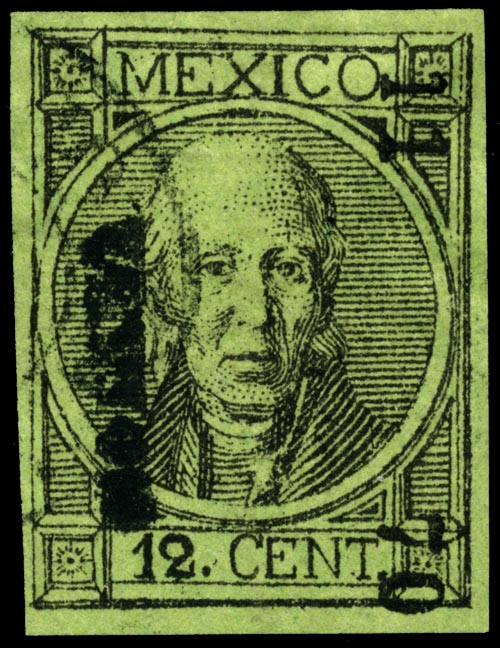
12c, 1868, later issue (thick numbers), with illegible district name, invoice number (11) and year ('70)

On 8 September 1868, Mexico issued a new Hidalgo design, referred to by collectors as the "Full Faced Hidalgo". The stamps were lithographed and issued both with and without perforations in denominations of 6c, 12c, 25c, 50c, and 100c. Two issues have been identified, the first with the numbers thinner and without a period; the second issue with thicker numbers followed by a period. There also are a multitude of minor variants and plate flaws, all of which, combined with the various overprints used, led Pulver to state that "In many respects, the issue of 1868–72 offers almost everything a specialist could want."

- A study of the 1868 issue is on the 1868 Stamps site.

In early 1872, it was announced that new stamps would soon be issued. When they were not ready on time, a number of the Full Faced Hidalgo stamps which had been demonetized and returned to Mexico City were re-issued overprinted with the word "Anotado", meaning "accounted for." These stamps were only used briefly until the new stamps were available.

==== Hidalgo issue 1872 ====
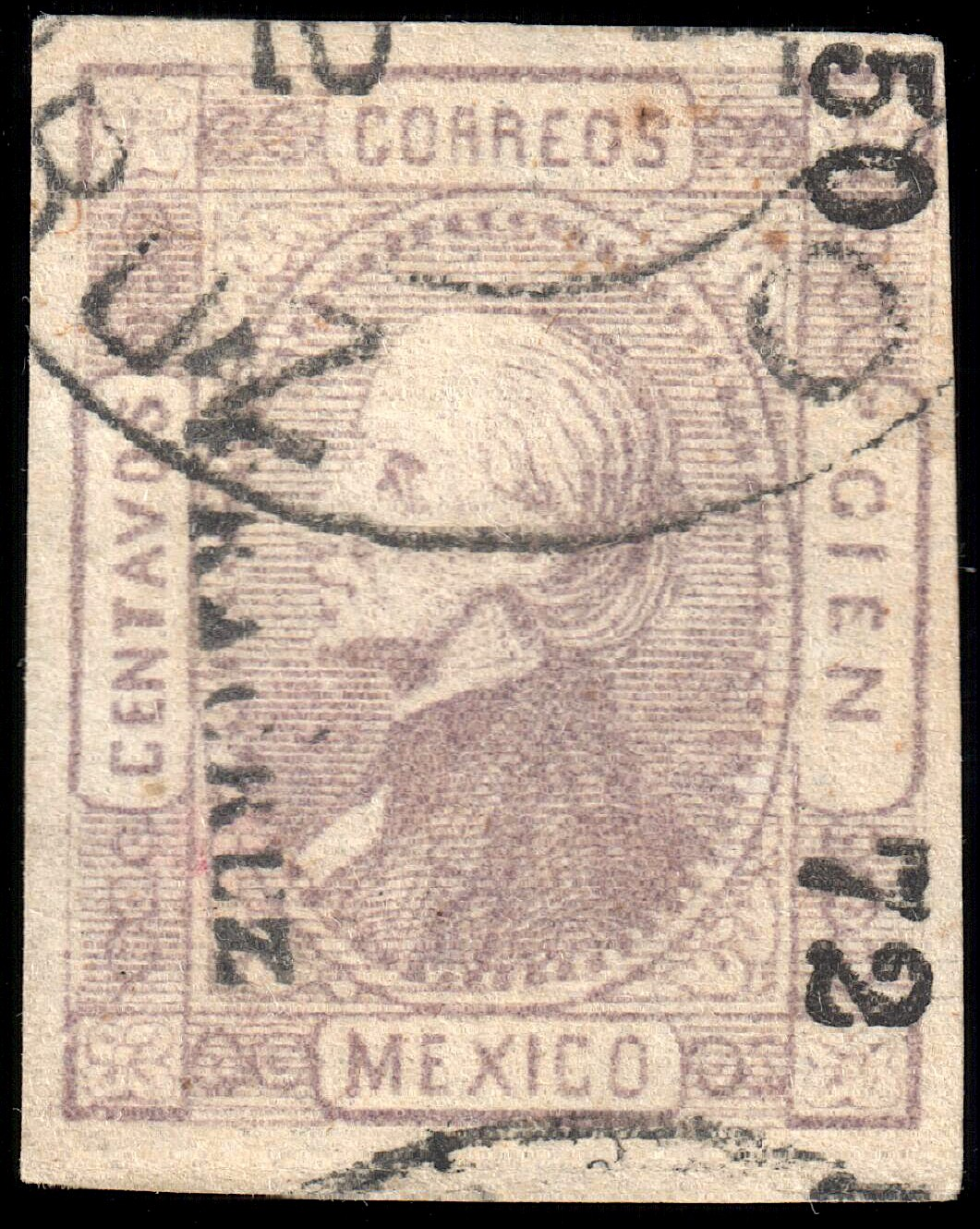
100c, 1872, the "nadir of Mexican stamp design", Veracruz overprint and invoice number 50 and year '72

On 2 April 1868, Mexico issued a new series, also depicting Hidalgo. These were lithographed and issued both imperforate and perforated, in values of 6c, 12c, 25c, 50c, and 100c. This issue has been less popular with collectors and has been called "the nadir of Mexican stamp design."

=== Bisects and splits ===
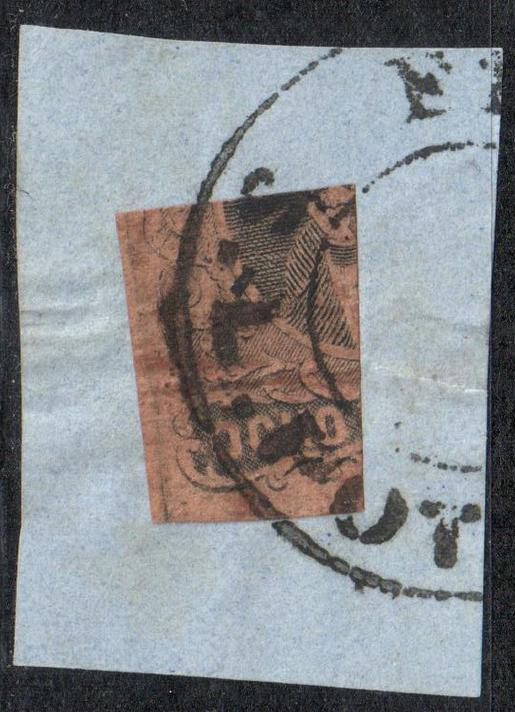
Mexico 1861 Quadrisect

During the classic period, some stamps were bisected or cut in half, and sometimes cut into three-quarters, quarters (quadrisected) and eighths pieces and used as postage for the proportionate value of a full stamp.

== Late nineteenth century ==
The 1872 Hidalgo issue marked the end of the earlier period of Mexican stamp production with mostly crude designs and poor printing, and with a distinct Mexican character. On Cinco de Mayo, 1874, the first stamps of a new Hidalgo issue were issued. These stamps were printed in New York by the American Bank Note Company and were professionally engraved on steel plates, with intricate machine turned designs like those on paper currency. In design and execution, this "Bank Note" issue closely resembles contemporary stamps manufactured by United States bank note companies for other Latin American countries such as Argentina and Brazil as well as the United States. Late in 1877, the printing plates were sent to Mexico City, and thereafter the stamps were printed in Mexico. There are a great number of varieties of this issue with differences in the overprints and type of paper and watermarks.

In 1879, Mexico joined the Universal Postal Union which required standard rates for international mail, that were actually lower than Mexico's domestic rates. Mexico accordingly released a new issue depicting Juárez for exclusive use on international mail. District overprints continued through 1883 after which they were no longer required.

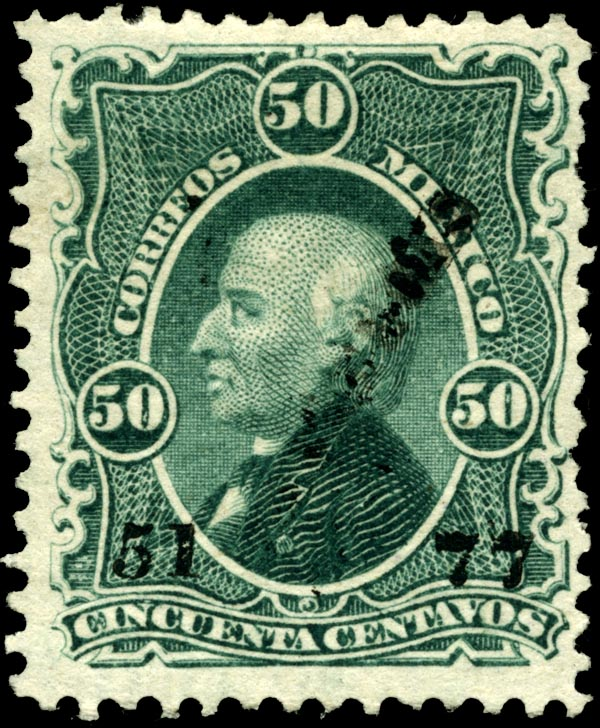
150c Hidalgo "Bank Note" 1874, with district name, invoice number (51) and year ('77)

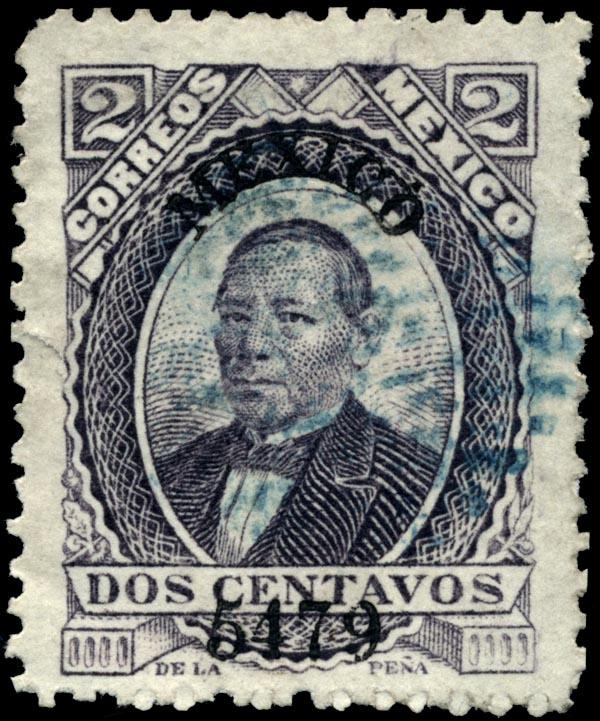
2c Juárez UPU issue 1879

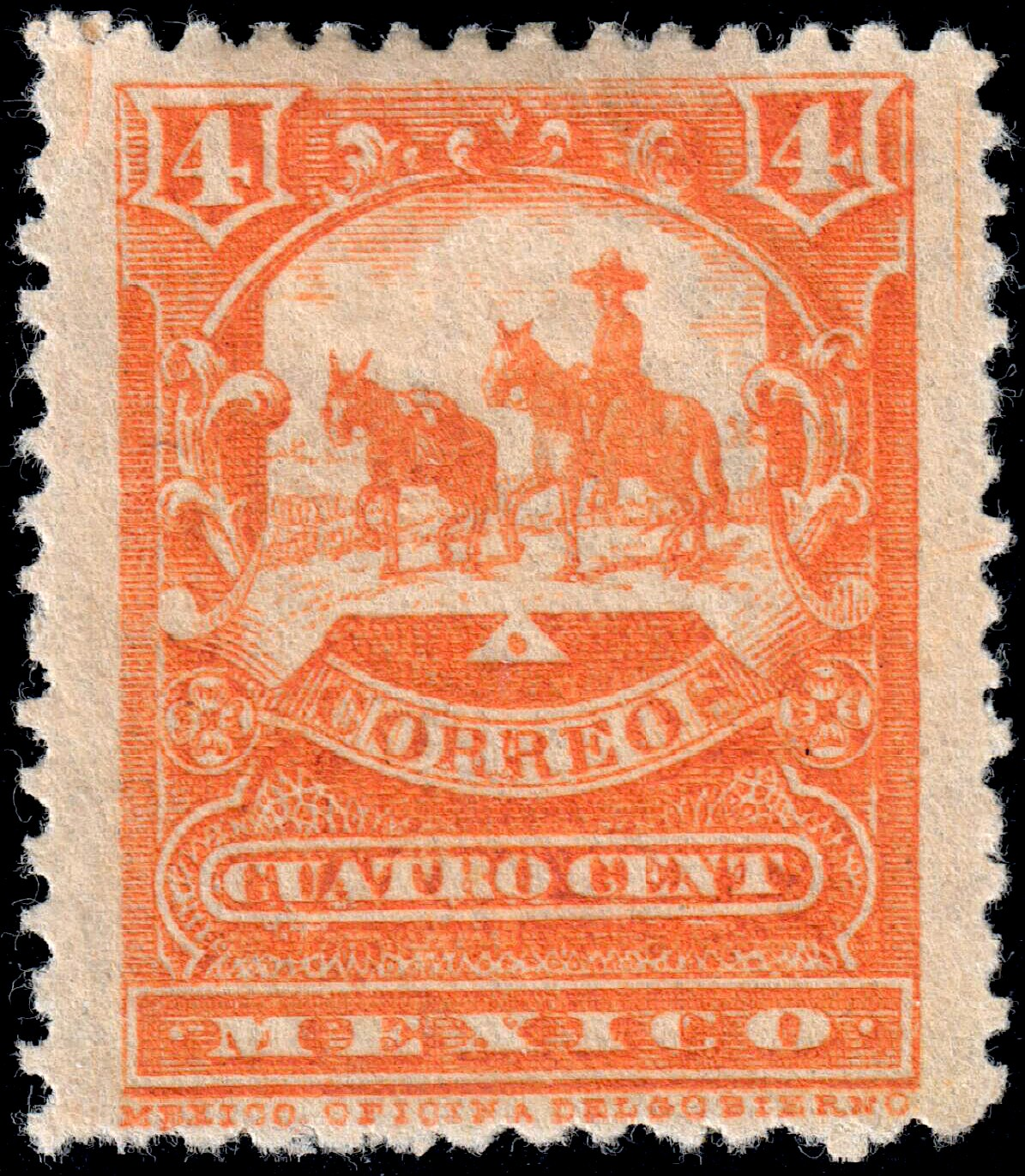
4c "Mulitas" issue 1895–1898

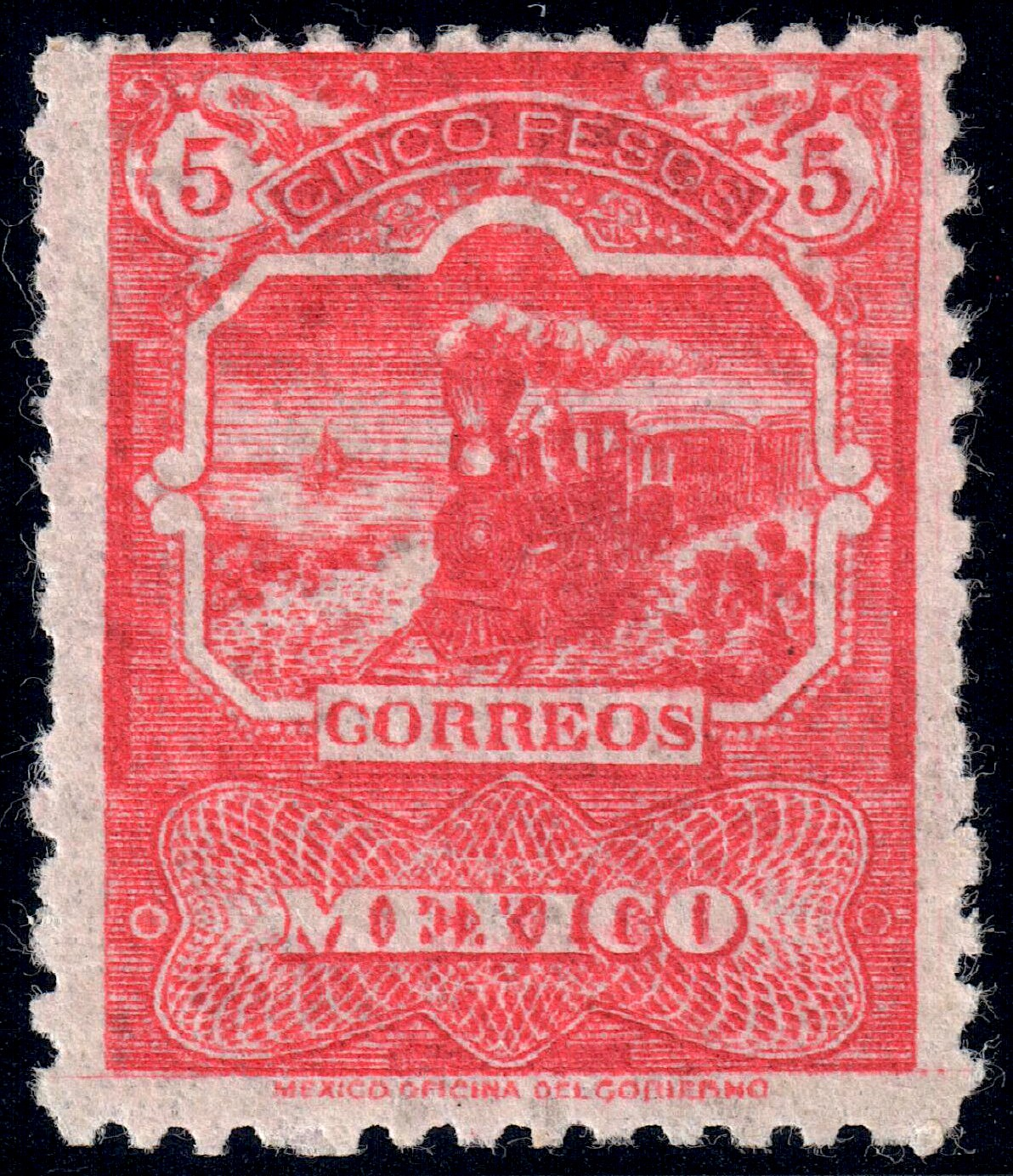
5p "Mulitas" issue 1895–1898

In 1895, Mexico issued a series of stamps depicting various methods of delivering mail, including a letter carrier, a mail coach and a mail train. Philatelists call this the "Mulitas" issue (little mules), after the 4 and 12 centavos stamps depicting a mule carrying a pack of mail followed by a mailman on horse. This issue has a great number of variants, including different perforations and watermarks, and is assigned 50 major (and many minor) catalog numbers in Scott.

== Twentieth century ==
=== Early twentieth century ===
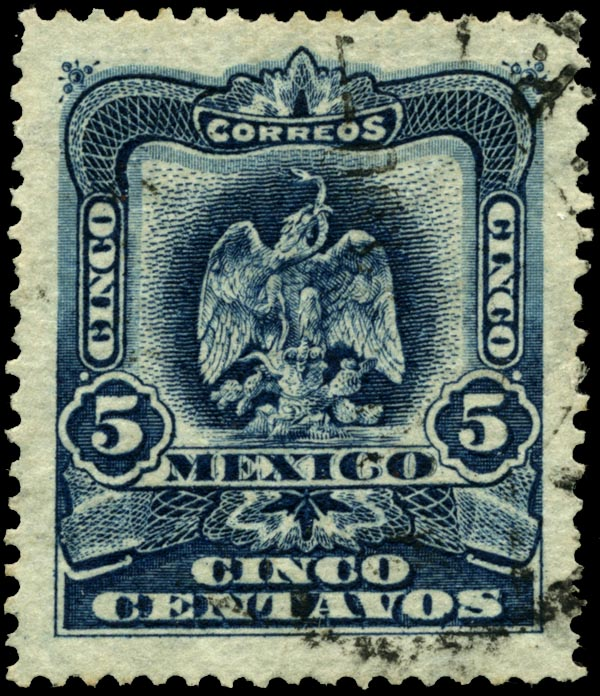
5c Eagle 1899

In 1899, Mexico issued a definitive series depicting the Mexican coat of arms with the eagle and snake for the lower values and images of Mexican landmarks such as the National cathedral for the higher values. The authorities had been dissatisfied with the quality of the locally produced Mulitas issue, and had this finely engraved issue manufactured by Bradbury Wilkinson and Company in London.

This was followed in 1910 with an issue commemorating Mexico's centenary of independence and depicting important Mexican patriots and historical events such as the Declaration of Independence.

=== Mexican revolution and civil wars 1910–1920 ===
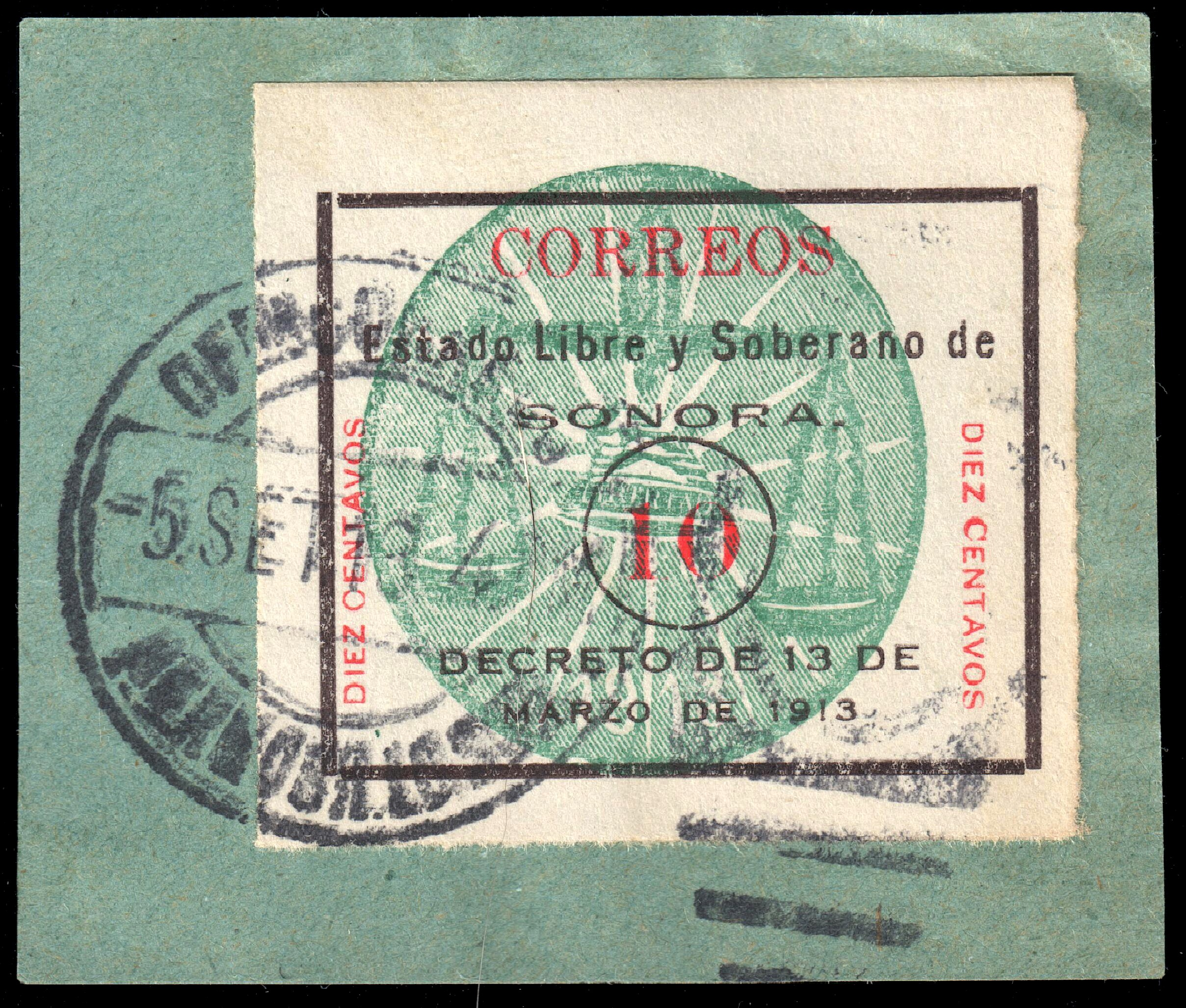
"Free and sovereign state of Sonora" 1913

Between 1910 and 1920 Mexico was torn apart by a violent revolution and subsequent civil wars. In the first decade of the 20th century, President Porfirio Diaz ruled Mexico with an iron fist as an agent of the wealthy, undoing previous land reforms. Opposition grew against Diaz and Francisco I. Madero challenged him in the 1910 election. Madero was jailed by Diaz who declared he won the election. Revolutionary actions ensued in support of Madero who defeated the Mexican army in 1911 and who was elected president in a special election. Madero turned out to be a weak president and was overthrown in a coup d'état by Victoriano Huerta, head of the army, who installed himself as president in 1913. This led to the outbreak of the first civil war in which opposition to the dictator Huerta was led by Venustiano Carranza. Carranza's forces were called the "Constitutionalists" and captured Mexico City in 1914 and installed Carranza as president. Carranza, in turn, was opposed by Francisco Villa and Emiliano Zapata, leader of the Zapatistas, in the second civil war and eventually driven out of Mexico City in 1915. Carranza reluctantly incorporated many reforms in the Constitution of 1917, but the opposition to him continued. Militarily, the war ended in 1920 with the death of Carranza and the ascension to power of General Álvaro Obregón but coup attempts and sporadic uprisings continued throughout the next decade.

Philatelically, this period resulted in numerous provisional and local stamps issued by the factions in control of different areas of the country. For example, in 1913–1914, the state of Sonora, controlled by the Madero forces, issued a series of typeset provisional issues, known as the "white" issue and the "green seal" issue. Sonora issued a typographed series of stamps known as the "Coach Seals" in 1914. The state of Oaxaca, maintaining a neutral position, similarly issued provisionals in 1915.

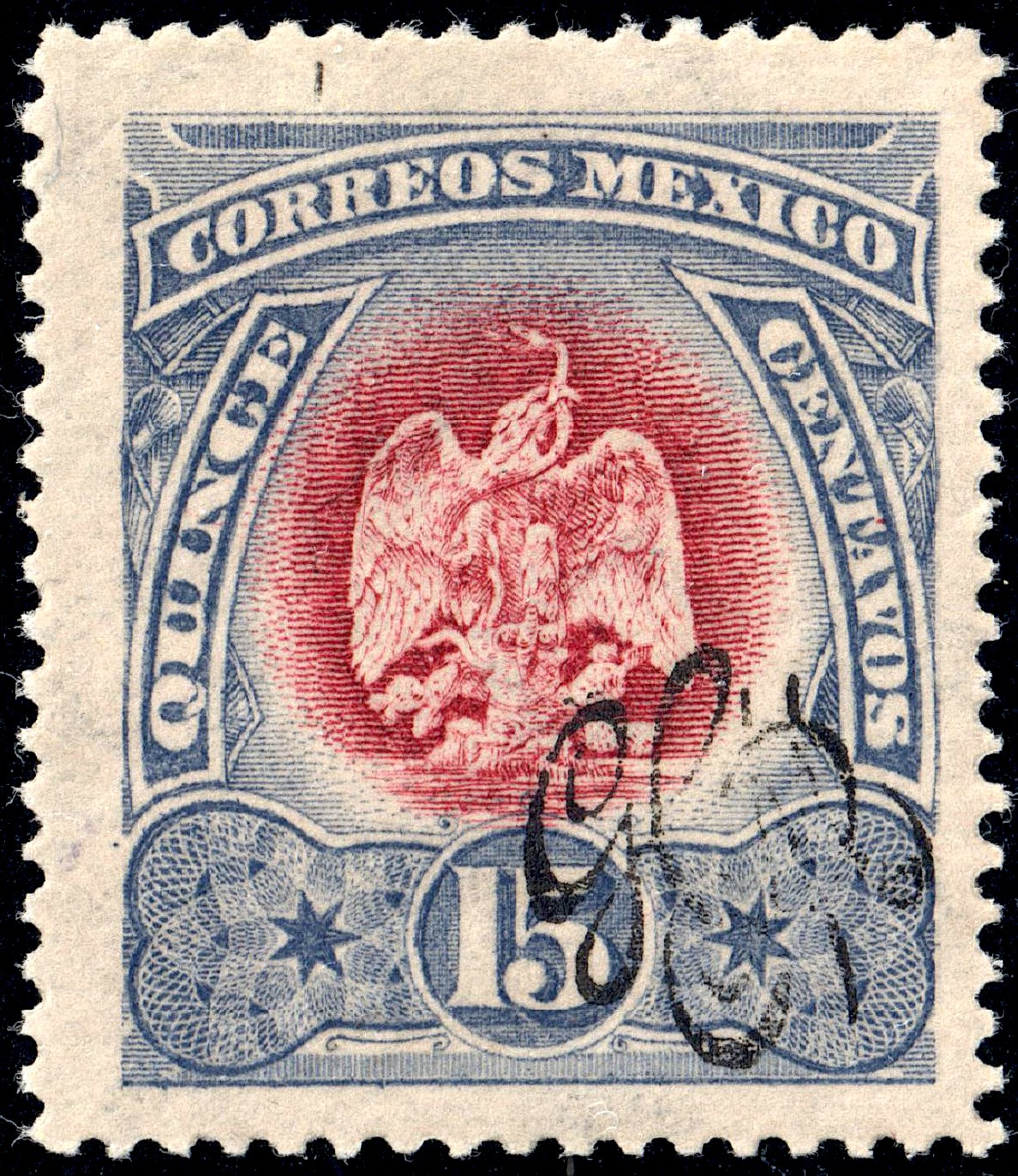
Mexico 1915 GCM "Carranza" overprint

In addition to the locals and provisionals, a great variety of overprints and surcharges were added to stocks of existing stamps by the powers then in control. Although many of these were printed on the stamps, they are commonly known by Mexican philatelists as "gomigrafos" or rubber stamps. Among the best known of these overprints are the "GCM" monograms, standing for "Gobierno Constitucionalista Mexicano" or the "Constitutional Mexican Government." Varieties of this overprint were first used by the Conventionalists supported by Villa, and later by the Constitutionalists and known as the Carranza overprints.

Despite great disruption caused by the civil wars, opportunists took advantage of the strong interest in stamp collecting by producing for the philatelic market a number of forgeries of both the local issues as well as the overprints. In addition, many of the covers from this period were manufactured for collectors with the assistance of postal authorities and did not represent ordinary postal use.

The great complexity of the stamp issues of this period has been studied by philatelists in recent years, most notably by Follansbee in The Stamps of the Mexican Revolution 1913–1916.

=== The twenties and thirties ===
Stamps produced in the two decade period from 1917 to the mid thirties retained a conservative character similar to those of other countries including the United States. The stamps were engraved and had a standard format consisting of a frame with inscriptions surrounding a portrait of an historically important person, building or scene.

In the mid-1930s, this staid format slowly began to change into a more varied concept with a more contemporary look. In 1934, a series of stamps was issued depicting ancient and contemporary Indians engaged in activities such as making pottery. The frames of each stamp differed noticeably and the central image sometimes crossed over onto the frame. The lettering began to take on a more modern aspect also, such as a distinct Art Deco font on the 1935 stamp illustrating Zapata. In 1934–1935, Mexico issued a series of airmail stamps depicting Aztec gods and symbols. The lettering on many of these was in a strong Art Deco style, and one stamp, the 5 centavos, was a borderless image of Aztec symbols mixed with wings, unlike any stamps Mexico had previously issued.

- Several Mexican stamps are illustrated in Art Deco stamps.

The appearance of Mexican stamps took an abrupt and major change with the 1938 issue commemorating the 25th anniversary of the Plan of Guadalupe. This issue had a thoroughly "modern art" look with drawings in a contemporary Mexican muralist style, surrounded by bold, modern lettering. These stamps were only the second issue to be printed by photogravure, which thereafter became a common method for production of Mexican stamps.

=== From World War II to end of the century ===
A number of stamps were printed in the early 1940s with drawings or paintings of images in a bold, Mexican Art Deco style, in a large square format with a common appearance. Many of these were the artwork of Francisco Eppens Helguera, a Mexican artist whose images were used on numerous Mexican stamps in the late 1930s through the early 1950s. Eppens also created the small, but iconic, 1939 postal tax stamp depicting a man attacked by a giant mosquito, issued to raise funds to combat malaria. Beginning in the 1940s, Mexico issued a great variety of stamps in different styles and sizes (often large), typically depicting persons, places, objects or events connected with the country and its history.The stamps were mostly printed by photogravure, but lithography reappeared and became common for a number of issues beginning in 1992. Mexico's stamps were printed in one or two colors until the stamps commemorating the 1968 Summer Olympics held in Mexico City in 1968, which were the first multicolored stamps issued by Mexico. These stamp issues included several series of stamps with common design elements which were added to over a period of time, especially as inflation increased postal rates. Several of these series have been popular with philatelists, foremost of which is the Exporta issue, discussed below. Annual stamp production increased significantly during the late 20th century.

- See also Eppens Gallery of Postal Stamps

==== Architecture and Archaeology series ====
From 1950 to 1975, Mexico issued a series of small format definitive stamps with similar basic design for surface mail. Although this series is known by philatelists as the "Architecture and Archaeology" series, it in fact included some other subjects such as the centennial of the Mexican constitution. Many of stamps

The "Architecture and Archaeology" series also included a number of larger format airmail stamps (1950–1976) with common design, although some specialists treat the two series separately. The airmail series had even more varieties than the surface mail stamps, some of which are fairly rare, selling for over $100 each. Pulver has stated that this issue "is made to order for a modern specialist, with collecting challenge comparable to a 19th-century classic issue." Some of the later issues in this series were printed on light-active paper, coated with optical brighteners causing it to fluoresce under ultraviolet light, or which had phosphorescent tagging added. These coatings were used for security purposes and to facilitate high speed machine sorting.

- etiangui ( Enrique Sanchez Garcia ) "The Arqueologia y Arquitectura serie, complete classification guide"

==== Exporta series ====
From 1975 to 1993, Mexico issued a series of definitive regular and airmail stamps in a uniform style depicting a great variety of products Mexico exports, such as beef, bicycles. tomatoes and chemicals, each stamp bearing the Exporta Logo. The series was added to over the years, and there are a great number of variants of papers, sizes, colors, watermarks, and plate flaws. A number of the stamps had burelage printed on their surface. Specialists have also identified 14 different weights and grades of paper used on the stamps. As a result of the collecting challenges, the Exporta issue has received a great deal of attention by collectors and is the most popular modern series.

- Ronald Hill, "Who Put That Big Red Tomato On That Little Bitty Stamp?"
- The Mexico Exporta Definitives
- John R. Endsley, Jr., A Comprehensive & Specialized Catalogue of the Exporta Issues of Mexico
- See Checklist of Exporta Definitives in Pulver pp. 103–107.
- See Michael D. Roberts, A Bibliography for the Exporta, Mexicana, vol. 57, no. 3, p. 121 (July 2008).
- See James O. Vadeboncoeur, The Exporta Issue of Mexico.
- See etiangui ( Enrique Sanchez Garcia ) "The Mexico Exporta serie, complete classification guide"

== Twenty-first century ==
In 2005, a Mexican stamp issue, part of a series commemorating Mexican cartoons, was the subject of widespread media attention. The issue of five stamps depicting Memin Pinguin, a poor Cuban-Mexican boy from a popular comic book, came under fire, primarily from those outside Mexico, as being a racist stereotype. The stamps received support from many in Mexico who contended the cartoon was culturally acceptable and not viewed as racially offensive. Mexican president Vicente Fox supported the stamp suggesting that critics did not understand the beloved character.

== Collecting Mexican stamps ==
Mexico is popular among philatelists particularly for its classic issues with their complex use of district overprints and invoice numbers, as well as the variety of cancellations used. The postal cancellations used on Mexico's classic period stamps have been very popular among philatelists and have been the subject of extensive study. As stated by Schatzkès & Schimmer, "Amongst the collections of cancellations, Mexico is pre-eminent. No other country possesses such a remarkable selection of ornamental cachets of unusual dimensions and of an extraordinary variety."

Other areas that have received extensive philatelic attention are Mexico's pre-stamp postal markings, the issues of the Mexican Revolution (1913–1916), and the modern Exporta issue (1975–1983), with its complex variety of papers, sizes, perforations and watermarks. James H. Beal stated that "few will doubt that any single country's issues raise more and vaster questions, require more care in the avoidance of pitfalls, or more defy neat solutions, than the stamps of Mexico."

=== Forgeries ===
Most of the classic issues of Mexico have been forged, primarily for the philatelic market, and numerous cancellations and district overprints have also been faked. In the early 20th century, Mexico sold the original printing plates for the 1856, 1861 and 1867 issues, as well as genuine handstamps, cancellation devices and paper to stamp dealers in the United States who made unauthorized reprints for sale to collectors. Some of the district names added in fact were fabricated and never existed.

Forgeries also are common for many issues through the end of the 19th century and also the revolution and civil war period. Detailed studies of some of the forgeries include:

- Nicholas Follansbee, The Stamps of the Mexican Revolution 1913–1916.
- Fernand Serrane, Serrane Guide: Stamp Forgeries of the World to 1926, Pennsylvania, 1998, pp. 235–239, covering forgeries and reprints from 1856 to 1879.
- Roberto Liera Gutiérrez, Características de Algunas Falsificaciones de Timbres de México, covering forgeries from 1856 – c.1915.
- James H. Beal et al., Mexico, in James M. Chemi, The Yucatan Affair, Pennsylvania, 1980 (2d. printing), pp. 146–286, covering the extensive cancellations, district names and revolutionary period overprints forged by Raoul de Thuin
- Joe D. Stuart, The Counterfeits of Mexico's 1856, 1861 and 1867 Issue, Mexicana, Vol. 50, No. 1 (Jan. 2001), p. 20.
- Forgeries of the 1856–1867 issues illustrated
- José Lorenzo Cossío y Cosío. La falsificación de algunos timbres postales antiguos de México. 1932.

== See also ==
- List of people on stamps of Mexico

== References and sources ==
Notes

Sources

- Asociacion Mexicana de Filatelia, Tres Siglos de Filatelia en Méjico (Mexico City: Grupo Grafico Romo 2006). Extensive illustrated history of Mexican stamps.
- Billings, Carter and Rich Daffmer, Foreign Mail Issues of Mexico 1879-1883 (2002).
- R.R. Billings, Mexico - Postal Issue of 1874-1883 (1960)
- Samuel Chapman, Postage stamps of Mexico 1856-1868, Lawrence, Massachusetts ([1926]; reprint 1976).
- Leo V. Corbett, Imperial Eagles of Maximilian's Mexico, Stanton, California (1993).
- Nicholas Follansbee, A Catalogue of the Stamps of Mexico 1856-1900, Ashland, Oregon (1998).
- Nicholas Follansbee, The Stamps of the Mexican Revolution 1913-1916, Collectors Club of Chicago (1996).
- Roberto Liera Gutiérrez, Características de Algunas Falsificaciones de Timbres de México (2007).
- Dale Pulver, Introduction to the Stamps of Mexico, Linn's Stamp News, Ohio (1992).
- Rowe, Kenneth. The Postal History and Markings of The Forwarding Agents. (1st edition 1966, supplement 1974, 2nd ed. 1984, 3rd ed. 1996.) ISBN 0917528123
- Scott catalog
- Joseph Schatzkès (rev. Karl H. Schimmer), The Cancellations of Mexico: 1856-1874, [San Antonio] (1983).
- Otto Yag & John K. Bash, The Pre-Stamp Postal Markings of Mexico, Elmhurst, Illinois (1965; 2nd printing 1973)
