= José Lorenzo Cossío y Cosío =

Mexican judge, philatelist and writer (1902–1975)

José Lorenzo Cossío y Cosío (born Mexico City, 12 May 1902 – died 1975) was a Mexican judge, philatelist and philatelic writer. The collection of his philatelic literature is now in the Museum of Philately of Oaxaca. He collected over 6000 works on Mexican philately and was an expert on philatelic fakes and forgeries.

== Legal career ==
During his legal career he was the Director of Legal Affairs for the PNR.

== Selected philatelic publications ==
The following are publications authored by José Lorenzo Cossío y Cosío.

- México Emisión Postal 1874-1883. 1932.
- La falsificación de algunos timbres postales antiguos de México. 1932.
- Los timbres mexicanos de ocho reales de 1861, negro y café con sobre-carga "APAM". 1935.
- Los timbres de tres centavos del Imperio de Maximiliano and the Álbum postal instructivo de la República Mexicana. 1936.
- México primera emisión postal para el exterior. 1937.
- México álbum postal histórico. 1956.
- Sellos usados en las oficinas del correo de la República Mexicana durante los años de 1868 a 1879. 1961.

== See also ==
- List of philatelists
- List of Mexicans
