= Crash cover =

Mail recovered from an accident

A crash cover is a philatelic term for a type of cover (including the terms air accident cover, interrupted flight cover, wreck cover), meaning an envelope or package that has been recovered from an air crash, train wreck, shipwreck or other accident. Crash covers are a type of interrupted mail.

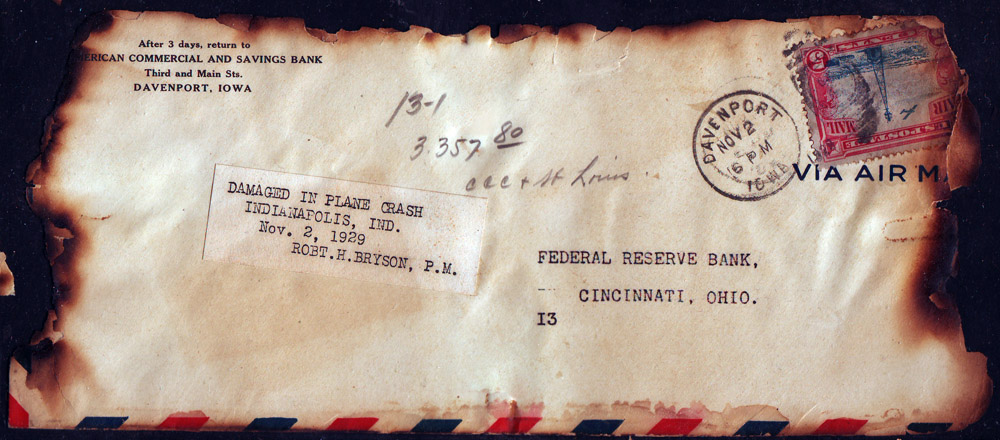
Example of a salvaged U.S. Air Mail Crash Cover (CAM #24, Indianapolis, Indiana, November 2, 1929)

Crashes of flights carrying airmail were a regular occurrence from the earliest days of mail transport by air. In many cases of aircraft crashes, train wrecks and shipwrecks, it was possible to recover some or even all of the mail being carried, with perhaps some charring around the edges of some pieces if there had been a fire, or water damage from flying boat crashes or shipwrecks. In such cases, the authorities typically apply a postal marking (cachet), label, or mimeograph that gets affixed to the cover explaining the delay and damage to the recipient, and possibly enclose the letter in an "ambulance cover" or "body bag" if it was badly damaged and then send it to its intended destination.

Aviation-related crash covers are a specialized collecting area of aerophilately and are much-prized items of postal history, because they are generally rare, but as tangible artifacts of often-tragic accidents they have a story to tell. The 367 covers salvaged from the Hindenburg disaster are especially desirable, with prices ranging from US$10,000 and up; a cover at the Corinphila auction in May 2001 realized 85,000 Swiss francs (US$75,000).

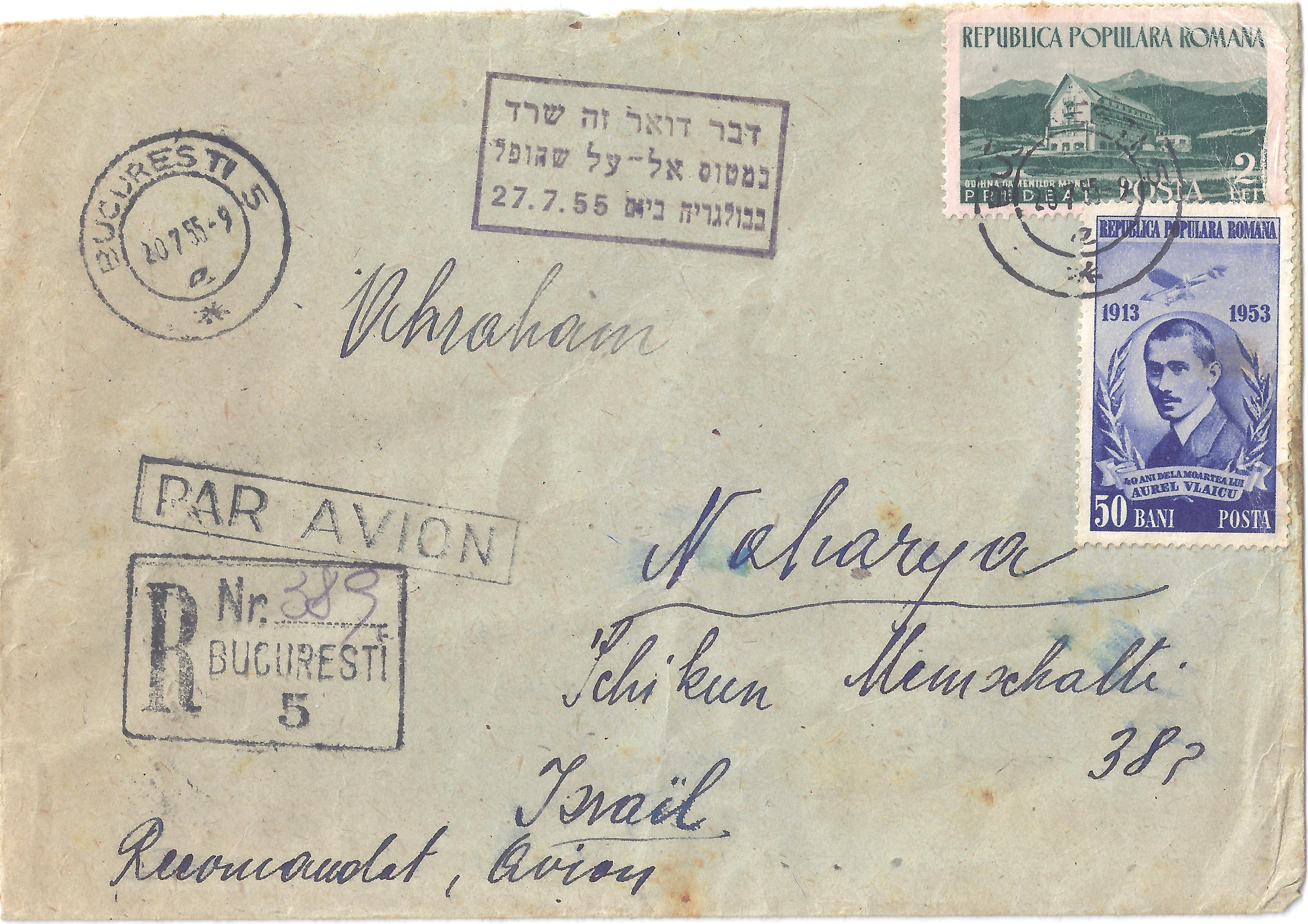
Crash cover from El Al Flight 402, an Israeli airplane shot down over the People's Republic of Bulgaria in July 1955. The small box at the top says in Hebrew, "This piece of mail survived in El-Al airplane that was shot down over Bulgaria on 27.7.1955."

The American Air Mail Society has a Crash Cover Committee specializing in the study of crash covers. There is also a Wreck & Crash Mail Society, whose members collect all types of crash and wreck covers.

== References and sources ==
Notes

Sources

- Nierinck, Henri L. (1979). Courrier Recouperé: Accident d'Avions - Recovered Mail: Airplane Crashes 1918-1978. R-Editions.
- Sanford, Kendall C (2003). Air Crash Mail of Imperial Airways & Predecessor Airlines. The Stuart Rossiter Trust Fund. ISBN 0-9530004-6-X. Archived from the original on July 22, 2007.
- Vogt, Ronny (1997). Irish Crash Airmail 2nd Ed. Irish Airmail Society.
