= Airmail stamp =

Postage stamp for mail transported by air

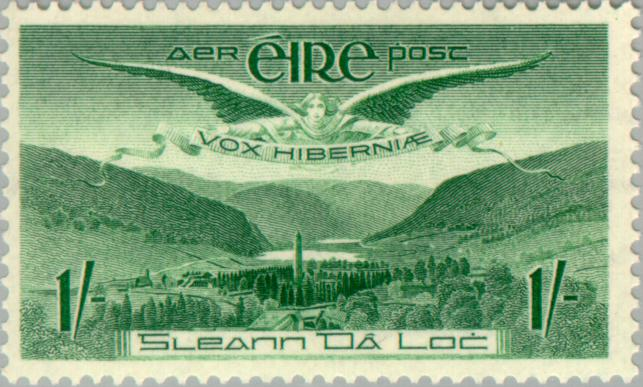
1949 Irish 1 shilling airmail stamp

An airmail stamp is a postage stamp intended to pay either an airmail fee that is charged in addition to the surface rate, or the full airmail rate, for an item of mail to be transported by air.

Airmail stamps should not be confused with airmail etiquettes, which are affixed to mail as an instruction to the postal authority that the mail should be transmitted by air.

== Development ==
=== History ===
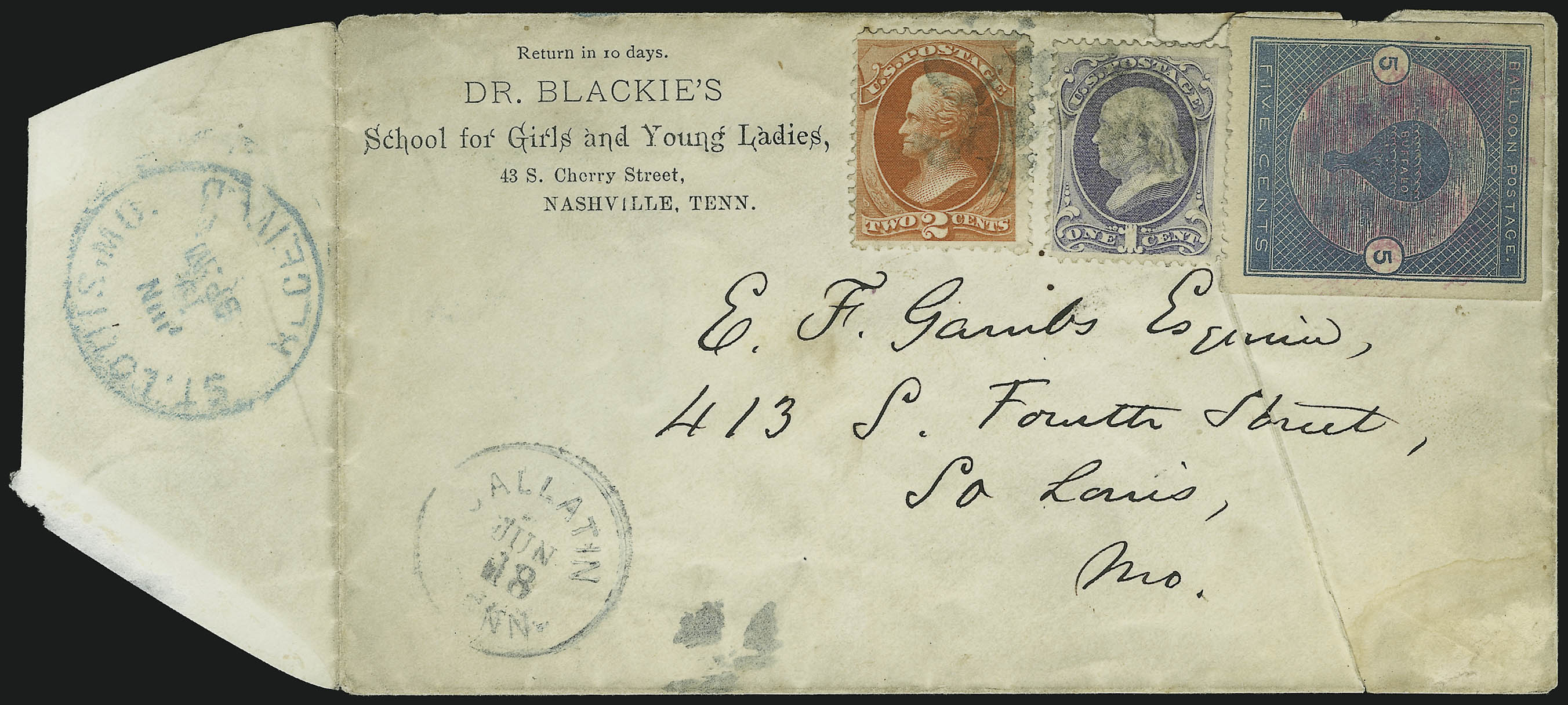
1877 Buffalo label affixed to balloon cover

With aviation developments, several countries started to experiment with flights, and postal authorities considered flying the mails. Initially flights were unofficial, but some flights such as the 1877 Buffalo balloon flight, carried mail, to which stamp-like labels were affixed. At the beginning airmail letters cost more than surface mail.

Both airmail stamps and stamps surcharged for airmail were issued, though some countries restricted the use of airmail stamps only to letters sent by airmail, while others allowed them to be used for other mail services.

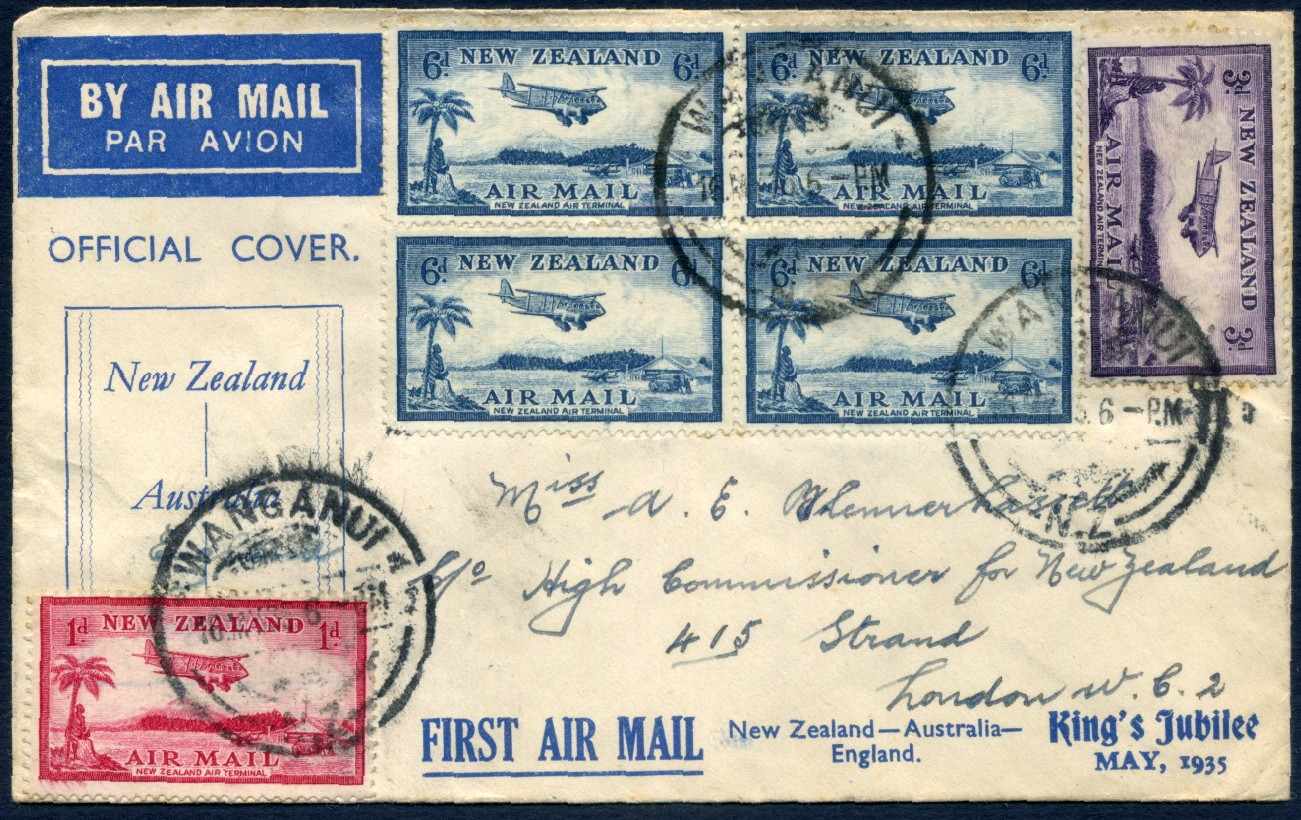
1935 First flight cover from New Zealand to England with three denominations of airmail stamps paying the 2 shilling and 4 pence rate

The first stamp depicting an aeroplane was a US 20-cent parcel post stamp issued on 1 January 1913 but not intended for airmail duty: the set of 12 showed transportation and delivery methods. Four years later an airmail stamp was issued in Italy. Several of the early ones were produced by surcharging other stamps with overprints; at first in 1917, Italy used express stamps; regular stamps were used by Austria in 1918, Sweden used official stamps in 1920. Some other examples are the use of fiscal stamps, telegraph stamps, postage due stamps, and parcel stamps by other countries. Airmail stamps have been issued for extra services, such as registered airmail, express airmail, airmail fieldpost, and even with welfare surcharges.

=== A new branch of collecting ===
In the 1920s and 1930s, when many countries issued airmail stamps to publicise their new airmail routes, a new branch of stamp collecting started. This led to an expansion that includes the collection of covers, and other postal items carried by aircraft. Airmail items from the early days are expensive due to the popularity of this collecting area. Specialised catalogues and albums are produced for collectors of airmail stamps and other aerophilatelic items. Many airmail stamps feature aviation themes that are an area of topical stamp collecting.

== Airmail stamp ==
=== First airmail stamps ===
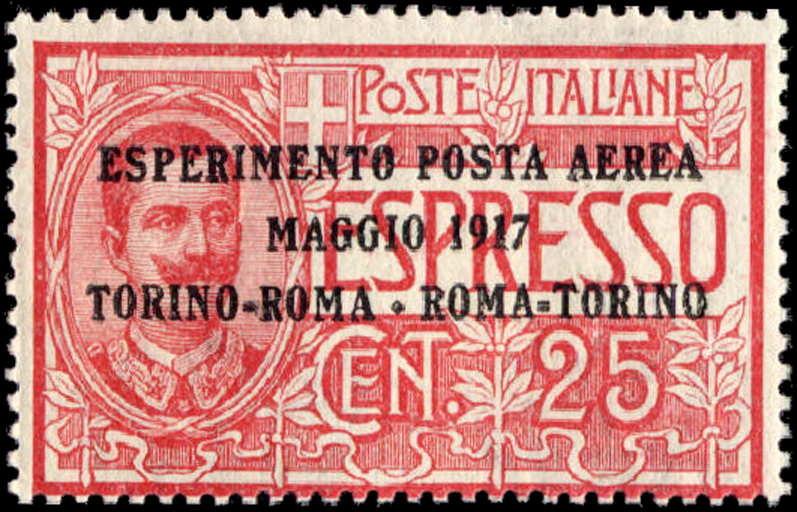
The first postage stamp issued for an airmail flight, by Poste italiane in May 1917

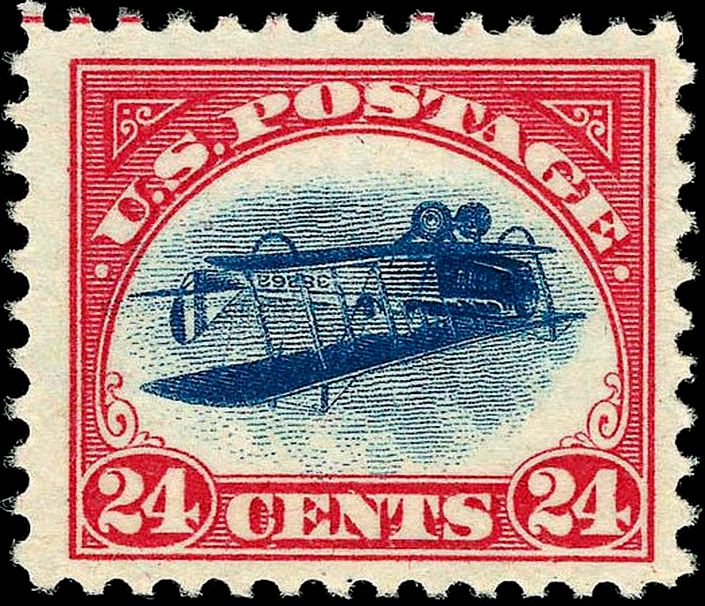
1918 US Inverted Jenny airmail stamp

The first postage stamp to be issued for an airmail flight was in May 1917 when Poste italiane overprinted their existing special delivery stamps. The following year, the United States Post Office Department issued the first airmail stamp specifically issued for the purpose; while it does not have "airmail" or "air post" printed on it, it illustrates a Curtiss JN-4 airplane. One pane of 100 stamps were found to have an invert error, known as the Inverted Jenny, because the airplane image in the centre is inverted relative to the outer frame. The error is one of the most well known airmail stamps. Several countries, such as Germany, Finland, Russia and the United States, issued special airmail stamps, or overprinted stamps, for the Zeppelin flights that took place in the late 1920s and early 1930s.

=== Local airmail stamp issues ===
Semi-official airmail stamps are not issued by the postal authority but have official sanction and are sometimes used for local posts, they are more accurately referred to a labels rather than stamps. For example, as noted above the privately produced 5¢ Buffalo balloon stamps were used on June 18, 1877, for a balloon flight from Nashville to Gallatin, Tennessee. The Vin Fiz Flyer, an early airplane, also carried semi-official stamps on its 1911 flight across the United States.

== See also ==
- Aerophilately
- Airmail stamps of Denmark
- Art Deco stamps
- List of United States airmail stamps

== References and sources ==
Notes

Sources

- Hornung, Otto (1970). The Illustrated Encyclopedia of Stamp Collecting. Feltham, English: The Hamlyn Publishing Group. ISBN 0-600-01797-4.
- Schoendorf, Robert (1979). The Buffalo Balloon Mail 1873-1877. New York: Cosmos Press.

Further reading

- Gomez, James; Ariel Books Staff (1996). U.S. Airmail Stamps. Andrews McMeel Publishing. ISBN 0-8362-0989-3.
- Newall, Alexander S. (1990). Airmail Stamps: Fakes & Forgeries. Newall Consultants. ISBN 0-904804-96-8.
- Vachon, Georgette (1974). Goggles, helmets, and airmail stamps. Irwin: Clark. ISBN 0-7720-0619-9.
