= Lloyd B. Gatchell =

American philatelist (1901–1969)

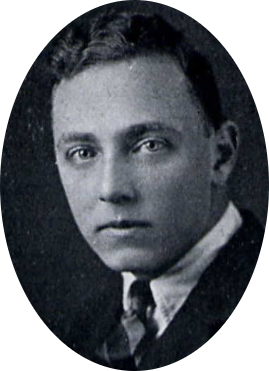
- Born: September 24, 1901
- Died: October 3, 1969 (aged 68)
- Engineering career
- Institutions: American Air Mail Society
- Projects: Early advocate of the collecting of air mail stamps; wrote extensively on the subject
- Awards: Glen W. Naves Medal; APS Hall of Fame

Lloyd B. Gatchell (September 24, 1901 – October 3, 1969) of New York City, was a philatelist who was named to the Hall of Fame of the American Philatelic Society. He was known as “Bart” to his philatelic friends and acquaintances.

== Collecting interests ==
Gatchell started collecting stamps as a youth and became so interested in the hobby that, as a teenager, he published and edited the Claremont Philatelist for a number of years. When air mail stamps started to be issued by the postal systems of various countries, Gatchell became a collector specializing in the collection and study of air mail stamps, a field of philately known as aerophilately.

== Philatelic literature ==
Lloyd Gatchell served as editor of various philatelic publications, chiefly The Air Post Journal for thirteen years and The American Air Mail Catalogue, where he served as editor-in-chief.

== Philatelic activity ==
“Bart” was a member of the American Air Mail Society and served the organization for a number of years, including serving as its president, and as its secretary.

== Honors and awards ==
Gatchell received numerous awards, including the Walter J. Conrath Memorial Award from the American Air Mail Society and the Glen W. Naves Medal from the Fédération Internationale des Sociétés Aérophilatéliques. He was named to the American Philatelic Society Hall of Fame in 1971.

== See also ==
- Philatelic literature
