= Art Deco stamps =

Postage stamps designed in art deco style

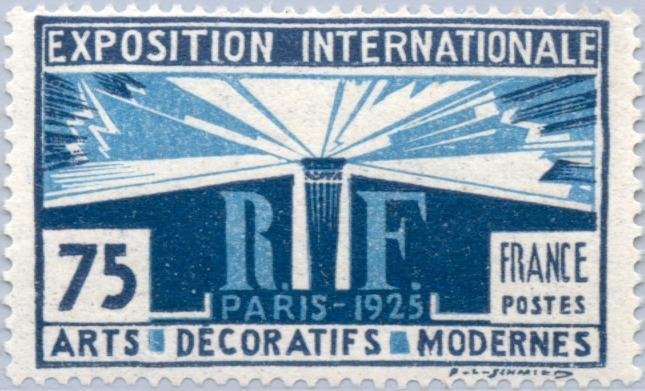
One of the stamps for the 1925 Paris International Decorative Arts Exposition denominated 75 centimes

Art Deco stamps are postage stamps designed in the Art Deco style, which was a popular international design style in the 1920s through the 1930s. The style is marked by the use of "geometric motifs, curvilinear forms, sharply defined outlines, often bold colors", and a fascination with machinery and modernity. This style strongly influenced contemporary architecture, furniture, industrial design, books and posters. Art Deco was named for after 1925 exhibit in Paris Exposition Internationale des Arts Décoratifs et Industriels Modernes (International Exposition of Modern Industrial and Decorative Arts). to which the American Topical Association has devoted a lengthy video. The exhibit lasted from April to October 1925 and displayed numerous objects in the new style. Examples of the style, however, are also found in the early twenties.

The Art Deco style also influenced postage stamp design in a number of countries in the twenties and thirties. One of the focuses of art deco was transportation and machines, particularly airplanes, and airmail stamps of the period often were designed in this style. Stamps from some countries showed strong art deco influence, while in others it was absent or barely noticeable. The countries whose stamp designs were most influenced by art deco include a number of European countries, such as France and the Netherlands, as well as several Latin American countries, particularly Mexico, Brazil and Chile. Stamps of the United States and Great Britain, in contrast, followed traditional design and showed little influence of this new style.

== Collecting of Art Deco stamps ==
"Topical or thematic stamp collecting" is "the collecting of postage stamps relating to a particular subject or concept." Art Deco stamps have been recognized as one such theme of collecting to which the American Topical Association has devoted a lengthy video.

== Notable Art Deco stamps ==
The Art Deco style originally developed in Europe and the earliest Art Deco stamps are from European countries in the 1920s. The style was used in some Latin American countries beginning in the mid-1930s, but never really spread to the United States, whose stamp designs remained traditional and conservative. Notable Art Deco stamps of this period include the following, some of which are small masterpieces of this style:

=== Europe ===
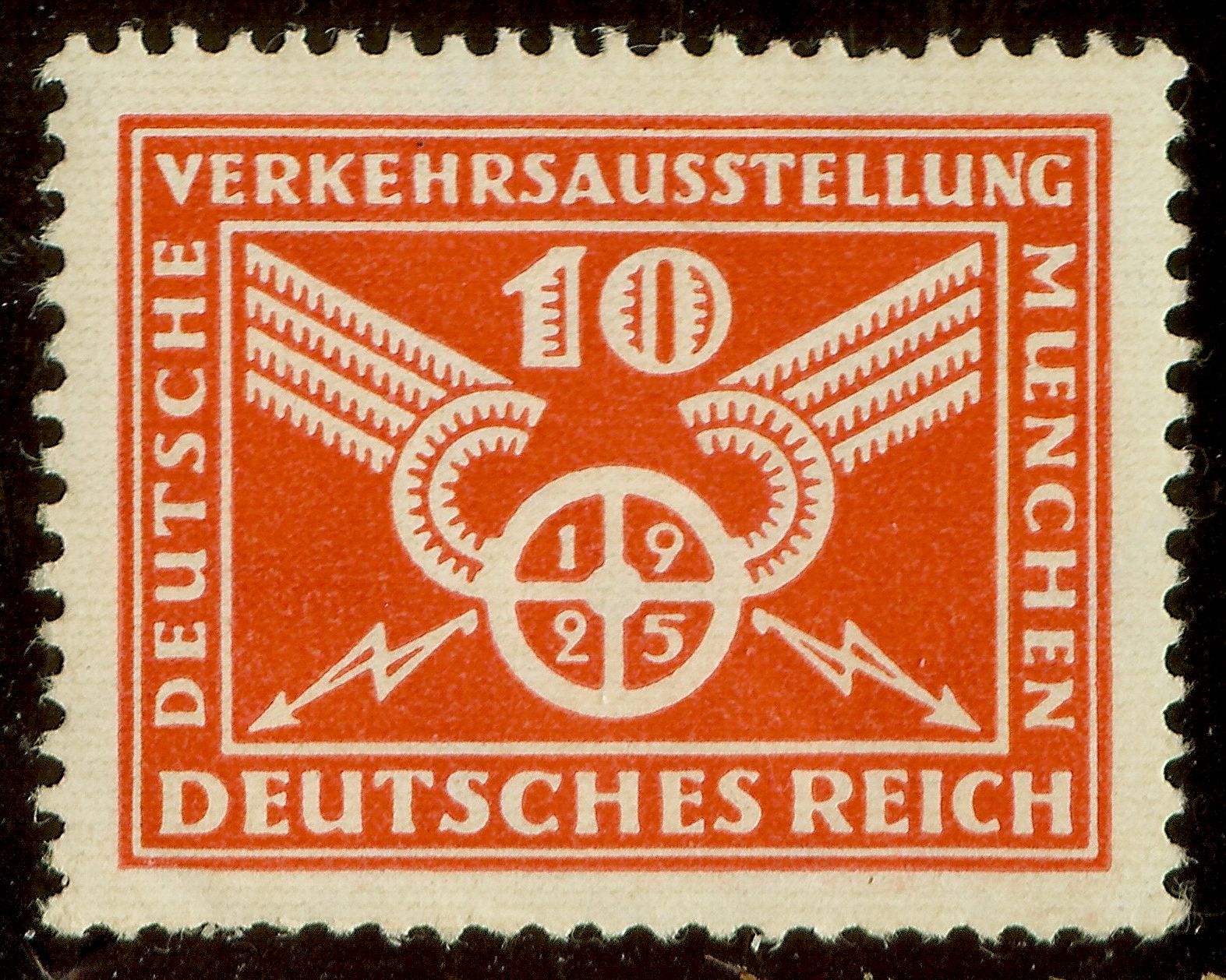
Germany 1925, "Traffic wheel"

- France: In 1925, France issued a set of stamps to commemorate the International Exhibition of Modern Decorative and Industrial Arts also was commemorated with a set, including a fine art deco image of the head of an African woman under which was block lettering within ruled lines, a common Art Deco device.
- Germany: In 1925, Germany issued a stamp displaying a bold Art Deco "traffic wheel" or traffic circle, in commemoration of the Deutsche Verkehrausstellung München 1925 or Munich Transport Exhibition of 1925. In 1934, it issued another striking image, two hands grasping a piece of coal, referring to the Saar Plebiscite held the following year which would determine that the coal-rich region would reunite with Germany.
- Netherlands: The stamps of the Netherlands showed influence of the Art Deco style as early as the mid-1920s, when the country issued two stamps honoring the Centenary of the Dutch Lifeboat Society. The stamps depicted highly stylized boats in distress and a lifeboat, with lettering showing some influence of the style. A triangular airmail stamp issued in 1933, depicting a Fokker Pander, was surrounded by a border with bold lettering typical of the style. In 1934, Curaçao, then a colony of the Netherlands, issued one of the iconic Art Deco stamps ever created, an airmail stamp carrying the highly stylized profile of the messenger god Hermes.
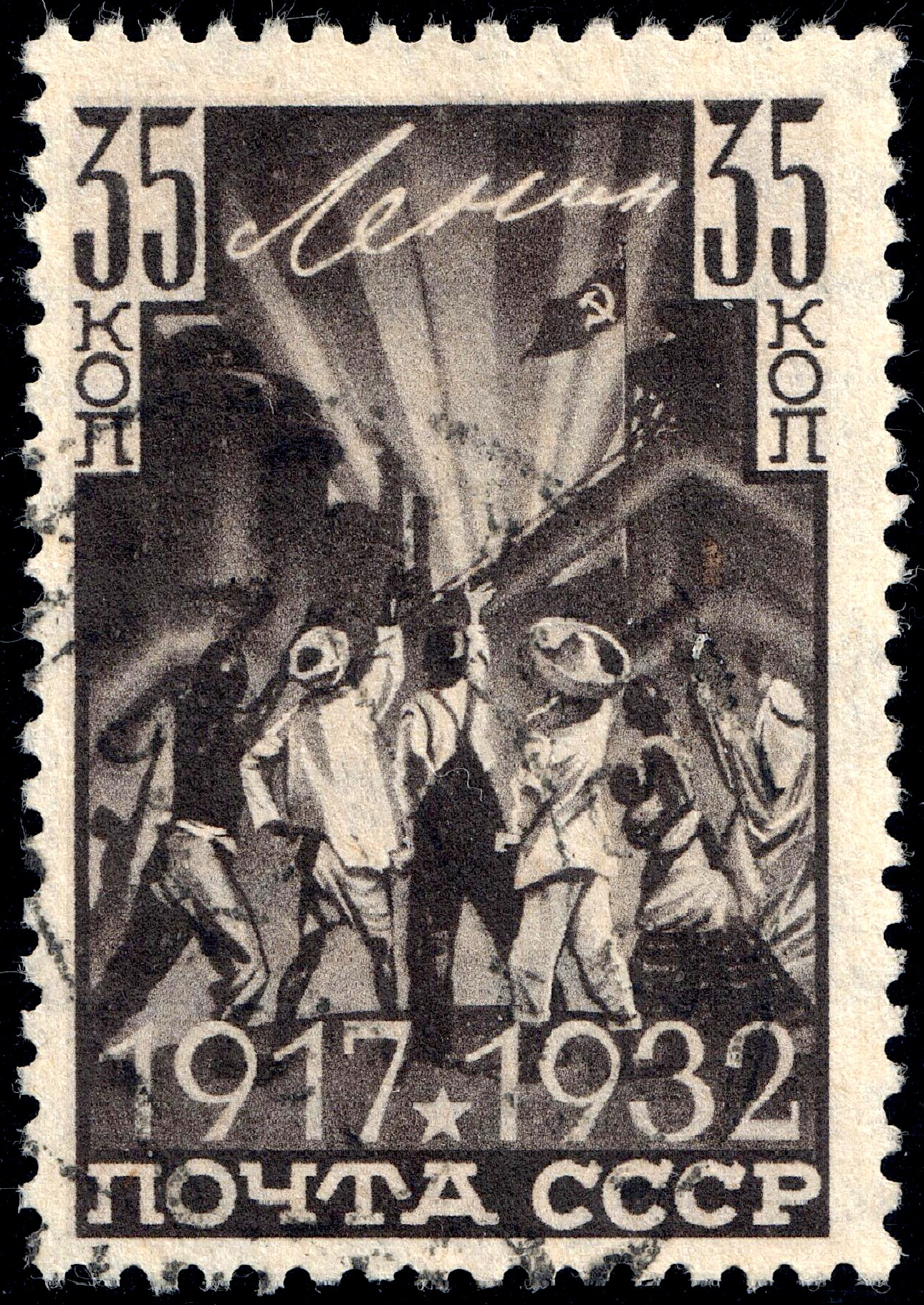
  USSR 15th anniversary of the October Revolution
- Austria: Austrian stamps of the 1920s showed influence of the Jugendstil or Art Nouveau style, but the new style made its influence known as the decade progressed. In 1925, Austria began a series of postage due stamps, and which included the country's name and an amount in a simple, bold design.
- USSR: USSR's stamps showed some influence of the Art Deco style, particularly in the lettering, beginning about 1929. In 1932–1933 it issued a series of stamps commemorating the 15th anniversary of the October Revolution, which display strong elements of the style.
- Switzerland: In 1932, Switzerland issued a stamp honoring the 1932 Disarmament Conference, and depicting an image of Peace in a bold Art Deco style
- Portugal: In 1936, Portugal issued a series of airmail stamps with a highly stylized airplane propeller and cloud, forming a fine Art Deco image.

=== Latin America ===
The Art Deco style was popular with several Latin American countries, particularly Mexico, Chile and Brazil.

- Mexico: Mexico issued some airmail stamps in the mid-1930s with lettering in a distinct Art Deco style. In 1939, Mexico issued a stamp with a boldly Art Deco image of the Arch of the Revolution, to commemorate the New York World's Fair. In the early 1940s, Mexico issued a number of stamps, commonly a larger format with strongly Art Deco influenced images particularly including the artwork of Mexican artist Francisco Eppens. A 1939 stamp with an image by Eppens depicted three modes of transportation—airplane, train and highway, a common Art Deco subject. A 1940 stamp by Eppens shows a helmsman, issued in connection with the Inauguration of Mexican President Manuel Ávila Camacho. A 1942 stamp, part of a series honoring the Second Inter-American Agricultural Conference with Eppens' artwork, depicts a highly stylized woman sewing wheat.

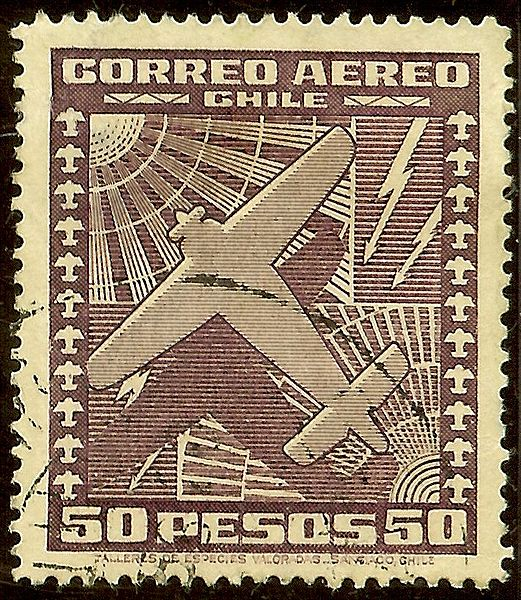
1934 Chile airmail stamp

- Chile: In the mid-1930s, Chile issued a series of airmail stamps designed in a style clearly influenced by Art Deco. These included a stylized airplane in flight following a radio navigation system from point to point and a stylized condor.
- Brazil: During the 1930s, Brazil issued a number of stamps influenced by the Art Deco style, especially in their lettering. The most striking Art Deco stamps, however, was the 1934 issue commemorating the 7th International Trade Fair, held in Rio de Janeiro, and depicting silhouettes of buildings and a profile of a construction worker with highly stylized Art Deco lettering.

=== United States ===
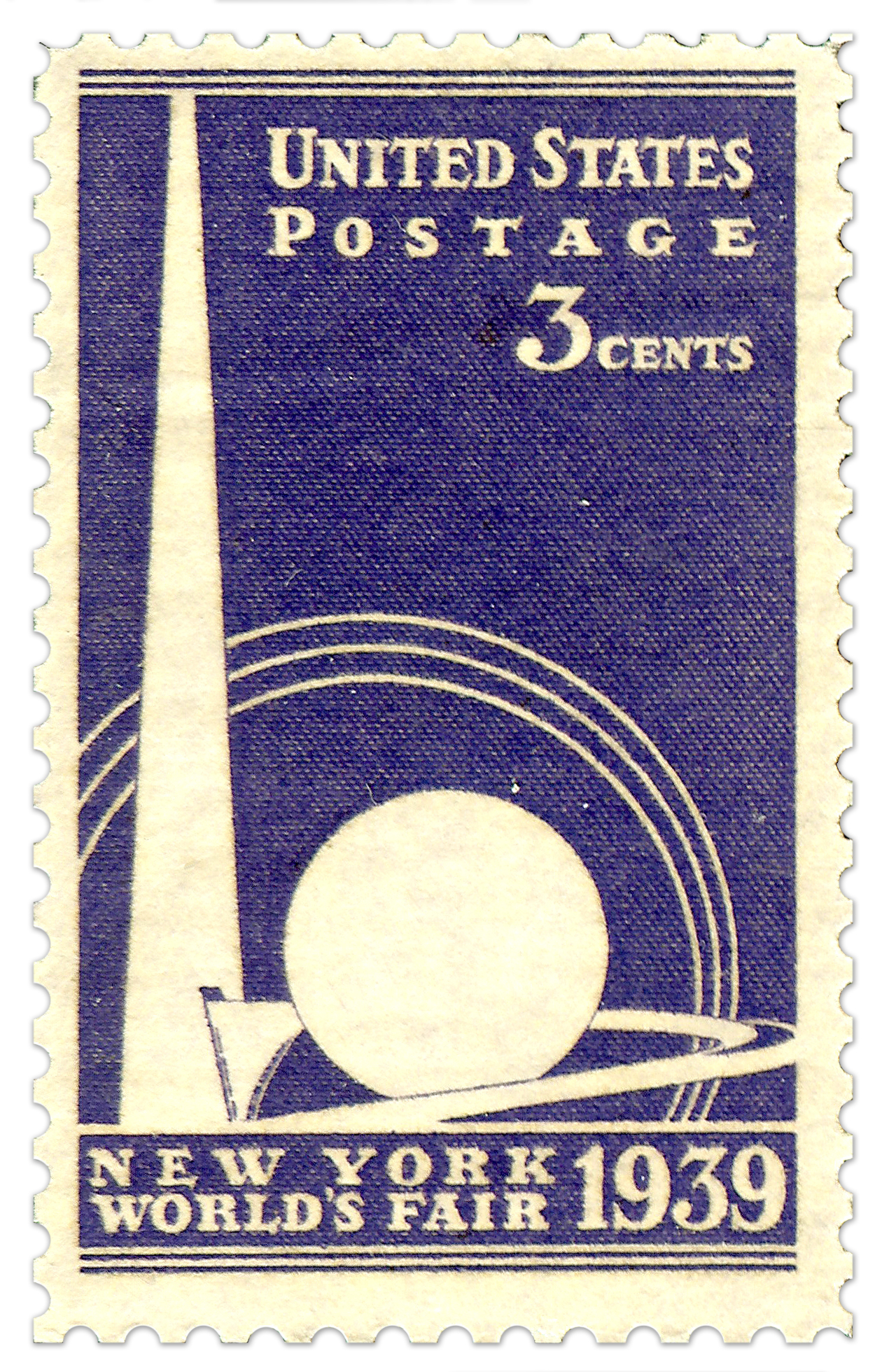
1939 Trylon and Perisphere at New York World's Fair stamp

The 1939 stamp depicting the Trylon and Perisphere, the centerpiece and symbol of the 1939 New York World's Fair. Although the Trylon and Perisphere itself is an iconic Art Deco image, the lettering and numbers on the stamp were done in a traditional, not Art Deco, font. With the exceptions of this and the 1942 "Win the War" stamp, United States stamps showed little or no Art Deco influence until 1998 when the Postal Service issued a stamp in a strong Art Deco depicting Ayn Rand (see Postage stamps and postal history of the United States).

== Revival ==
The Art Deco style has been revived on stamps. In 1998, the United States issued a stamp honoring Ayn Rand in a distinct Art Deco style. In 2001, it issued two definitive stamps illustrated by Nancy Stahl depicting an Art Deco eagle on a mailbox. In 2003, it issued the stamp titled Wisdom, illustrated by Nancy Stahl, honoring Rockefeller Center. Art Deco architecture stamps were revived with New Zealand issuing a set in 1999.

== See also ==
- Postage stamp design
- Topical stamp collecting

== Sources ==
- 2007 Specialized Catalogue of United States Stamps and Covers. Sidney, Ohio: Scott Publishing Company. 2006. p. 960. ISBN 0-89487-392-X.

== Outside references ==
- Karen Greene & Lynne Lavelle, Art deco mailboxes : an illustrated design history, W.W. Norton & Company, 2015, ISBN 978-0-393-73340-2, 0-393-73340-8
