= Daily Mail aviation prizes =

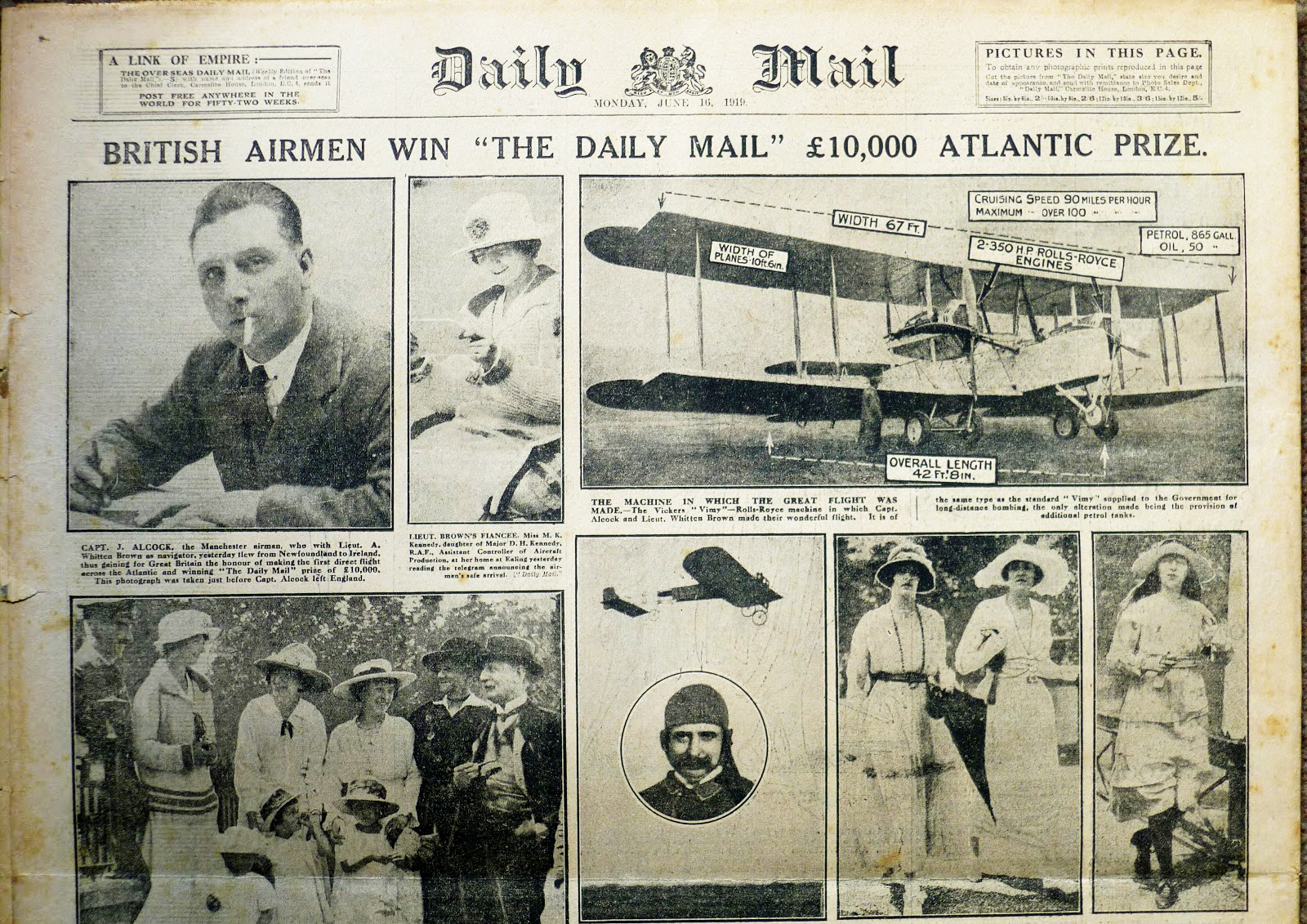
Daily Mail front cover – 16 June 1919

Between 1906 and 1930, the Daily Mail newspaper, initially on the initiative of its proprietor, Alfred Harmsworth, 1st Viscount Northcliffe, awarded numerous prizes for achievements in aviation. The newspaper would stipulate the amount of a prize for the first aviators to perform a particular task in aviation or to the winner of an aviation race or event. The most famous prizes were the £1,000 for the first cross-channel flight awarded to Louis Blériot in 1909 and the £10,000 given in 1919 to Alcock and Brown for the first non-stop transatlantic flight between North America and Ireland.

The prizes are credited with advancing the course of aviation during the early years, with the considerable sums offered becoming a much-coveted goal for the field's pioneers.

== Prizes ==
Year announced	Year awarded	Contest	Amount (£)	Adjusted 2023 amount	Winner(s)
1906	1910	London to Manchester flight	10,000	£1,289,400	Louis Paulhan
1907	1907	Model aeroplane competition	100	£13,400	Alliott Verdon Roe, W. Howard
	1908	Quarter mile out and return flight	100	£13,200	Henri Farman
1908	1909	Cross-channel flight	1,000	£131,700	Louis Blériot
	1909	Circular mile by a British aircraft	1,000	£131,700	John Moore-Brabazon
1909	1909	Fastest lap at Blackpool Aviation Week	1,000	£131,700	Henri Farman
	1910	Second cross-channel flight	100	£12,900	Jacques de Lesseps
1910	1910	Best cross-country aggregate	1,000	£128,900	Louis Paulhan
1910	1911	Circuit of Britain race	10,000	£1,286,300	André Beaumont (Jean Conneau)
1912	1912	Aerial Derby cup	105	£13,100	Thomas Sopwith
1913	1913	Aerial Derby cup	105	£13,100	Gustav Hamel
1913, (Note: Suspended during the war and renewed in 1918 with different conditions) 1918	1919	Transatlantic flight	10,000	£580,500	Alcock and Brown
1913	--	Circuit of Great Britain for "waterplanes"	5,000	£621,500	
1914	1914	Aerial Derby cup	105	£12,700	W. L. Brock
1914	Cancelled	Circuit of Great Britain	5,000	£606,100	
1919	1919	Aerial Derby cup	210	£12,200	Gerald Gathergood
1923	1923	Economy flight for motor gliders	1,000	£72,000	
1925	1926	Economy flight for dual-control light aircraft of British construction	3,000	£219,900	George Bulman (Hawker Cygnet)
1930	1930	Solo flight from England to Australia	10,000	£798,600	Amy Johnson

In addition, four "consolation" prizes were awarded:

Year announced	Year awarded	Contest	Amount (£)	Winner(s)
1906	1910	London to Manchester flight	105	Claude Grahame-White
1910	1911	Round-Britain flight	200	Jules Védrines
1913	1913	Round-Britain flight for British "waterplanes"	1,000	Harry Hawker
1913	1919	Transatlantic flight	5,000	Harry Hawker, Kenneth Mackenzie Grieve

== See also ==
- List of aviation awards
- Scott Collection, a collection of aerophilately items relating to the 1912 flights
