= Gatchell =

Gatchell may refer to:

== Places ==
- Gatchell, Greater Sudbury, an urban neighbourhood in Greater Sudbury, Ontario, Canada.

== People ==
- John Gatchell (1945–2004), American jazz trumpeter
- Lloyd B. Gatchell (1901–1969), American philatelist
