= Walter J. Conrath =

- Born: January 20, 1907
- Died: May 7, 1942 (aged 35)
- Engineering career
- Institutions: American Air Mail Society
- Projects: President of the American Air Mail Society; wrote extensively on aerophilately
- Awards: APS Hall of Fame

Walter J. Conrath (January 20, 1907 – May 7, 1942) was a stamp collector who specialized in aerophilately, the study of air mail stamps, and wrote extensively on the subject. His career was cut short when he died in an automobile accident at the age of 35.

== Collecting interests ==
Conrath collected air mail stamps and air mail postal history.

== Philatelic literature ==
Walter Conrath edited and published The Airpost Journal and the American Air Mail Catalogue. He is remembered most for his 1940 book Mail Through the Air: A Review of the Development of Air Mail and Aero-Philately which continued to be republished after his death.

== Philatelic activity ==
In addition to participating in various aerophilatelic societies, Conrath was an early member of the American Air Mail Society and was its president from 1936 to 1938.

== Honors and awards ==
In recognition of his influence in the field of aerophilately, Conrath was elevated to the American Philatelic Society Hall of Fame in 1942.

== See also ==
- Philately
- Philatelic literature
