= Scott Collection =

Post/philatelic material collection

The Scott Collection is a collection of philatelic material relating to British internal airmails that forms part of the British Library Philatelic Collections. The collection is comprehensive in most areas and ends in the 1970s. It includes a specialised section of 1912 Daily Mail flights and was formed by H. Eric Scott. It was donated to the library in 1977.

== See also ==
- Aerophilately
