= Stuart Rossiter =

British philatelist (1923–1982)

- Born: 25 February 1925
- Died: 1982 (aged 56–57)
- Alma mater: King's College, Cambridge
- Military career
- Allegiance: United Kingdom
- Branch: Royal Air Force
- Unit: RAF Fighter Command
- Conflicts: Second World War

Percival Stuart Bryce Rossiter (25 February 1923 – 1982) was a renowned British philatelist and postal historian who wrote extensively about British postal history and postage stamps of British colonies in Africa and was involved in numerous philatelic institutions. In his Will he created The Stuart Rossiter Trust which has become a leading publisher of books on postal history.

== Early life ==
Stuart was educated at Framlingham College in Suffolk, leaving in 1941, after which he served in RAF Fighter Command during World War II, achieving the rank of Flying Officer. After the war he completed his education at King's College, Cambridge, where he obtained a BA degree in 1948 and an MA in 1953.

== Career ==
Rossiter was employed as Assistant Librarian at Westminster City and Kent County Libraries and in 1954 joined the staff of the Blue Guides where he rose to become editor (1963–1973). His Blue Guides book on Greece was highly praised and as a result he was elected a Fellow of the Royal Geographical Society. He also contributed to the Daily Telegraph. His most notable philatelic work is The Stamp Atlas.

== Philately ==
Rossiter became interested in stamp collecting and geography from the age of six and he would pursue these interests throughout his life. He is famous for his international stamp exhibitions through which he would display various portions of his extensive personal collection along with those of other collectors. Rossiter edited The London Philatelist, house journal of The Royal Philatelic Society London, from 1975 and in 1977 became President of the Society of Postal Historians.

He founded and was the Chairman of the East Africa Study Circle and was the editor of its journal. British East Africa was his main philatelic interest and he wrote a series of articles on the postal history of Uganda that were published in Postal History International.

He became President of the Society of Postal Historians in 1977 and was also the editor of The Postscript, its journal. Rossiter exhibited his collection of stamps and postal history internationally.

As a student of postal history, Rossiter realised that a knowledge of geographical and political changes was essential to a proper understanding of philately. The arduous task of locating such relevant information is what led Rossiter and John Flower, working through the renowned Blue Guides, to propose a Stamp Atlas, which was finally completed after his death in 1982.

== Selected publications ==
Some of Rossiter's works include:

- The Stamp Atlas
- History of the East African Army Postal Service
- The Blue Guide Denmark
- The Blue Guide London
- Rome and Environs (Blue guides)
- Greece (Blue guides)
- Yugoslavia: the Adriatic Coast (Blue guides)
- The London Quiz Book, 1957.

== Death ==
In 1982 Rossiter died from leukaemia at the age of fifty nine and left all of his estate to the Stuart Rossiter Trust, as did his mother after him. The Trust has become a major publisher of postal history and is involved in the study of the postal history around the world.
