= Seymour Collection =

Philatelic collection relating to the first commercial jet airliner

The Seymour Collection is a collection of philatelic material relating to the development and operation of the de Havilland Comet aircraft, that forms part of the British Library Philatelic Collections. The collection was formed by Kenneth Seymour and donated to the library by his daughter Yvonne Wallace and his son Derek Seymour in 2003.

== See also ==
- Aerophilately
