= Nellie Brimberry =

American postmistress

Nell Butner Brimberry (born c.1865 – February 20, 1966) was an American postmistress from Albany, Georgia. She became the first postmistress of a major United States Post Office in 1910.

Brimberry was born as Nell F. Butner in Georgia. She married Halbert F. Brimberry in Fulton County, Georgia on July 12, 1885. H. F. Brimberry had been the postmaster in Albany, succeeding his father, from 1902 until his death in 1909.

In 1911, she inaugurated the first U.S. airmail flight and struck the first airmail stamp. This preceded the first transcontinental airmail flight by nine years.

Brimberry played a significant role in the agricultural history of the American South by helping pecan growers gain the right to package and mail their products.

Brimberry died in Dougherty County, Georgia on February 20, 1966, at the age of 101.
