= Fitzgerald Collection =

Stamp collection

The Fitzgerald Collection is an extensive philatelic collection of air mail stamps donated to the British Library and announced in 1951.

In 1953 a further donation of funds was provided by Mrs Augustine Fitzgerald to preserve and catalogue the collection. In 2006 the Fitzgerald Airmail Fund was reported at £68,000.

== Description ==
At the time of donation, The Times described the collection as the finest of its kind. As well as the extensive collection of stamps for early postal flights up until the 1930s, the collection includes related artefacts such as souvenirs of postal balloons as per the siege of Paris in 1870 and documents such as the air pilot's licence issued to Sir John Alcock. It is particularly well represented in the material of France, Germany, Italy, Newfoundland and United States.

== See also ==
- British Library Philatelic Collections
