= Airmail etiquette =

Label used to indicate that a letter is to be sent by airmail

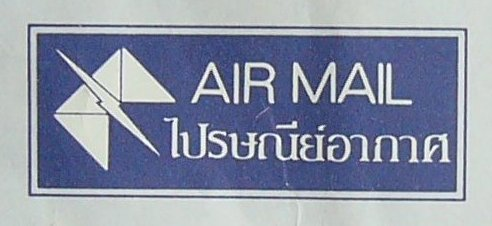
Imprinted etiquette of Thailand

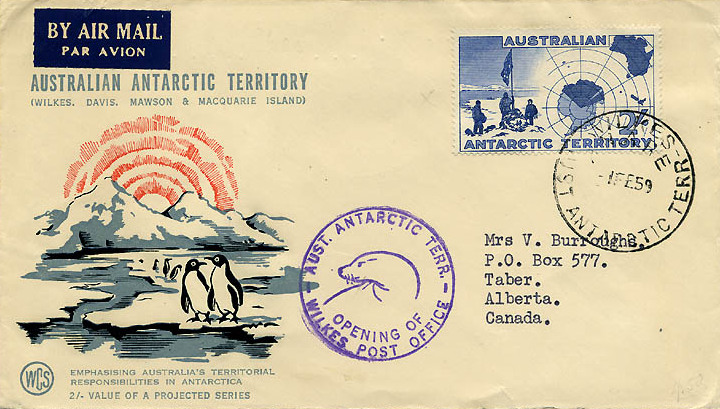
This 1959 cover from the Australian Antarctic Territory has a plain dark blue airmail etiquette in the upper left corner.

An airmail etiquette, often shortened to just etiquette, is a label used to indicate that a letter is to be sent by airmail.

== Etymology ==
The term "airmail etiquette" derived from the French word étiquette ("label, sticker"), from which is also derived the English word etiquette ("rules of behavior").

== Use ==
Because airmail etiquettes are just instructions to postal clerks, and have no monetary value, their printing and distribution need not be as carefully controlled as for postage stamps, and most are privately produced. The usual design is a plain blue oblong, with the phrases "AIR MAIL" and/or "PAR AVION" in white letters. Various airlines and hotels have also produced etiquettes.

The airmail etiquette may be omitted if airmail stamps are used on the letter, and in some cases even this is not necessary if a country sends out all its foreign mail by air. In some regions, such as the United Kingdom, one may simply write "PAR AVION -- BY AIR MAIL" on the envelope, even though etiquettes are available free of charge from post offices.

The United States officially requires international First Class and Priority Mail letters to be marked with "AIRMAIL/PAR AVION". This requirement is often ignored in modern practice since the United States Postal Service discontinued international surface mail in 2007; all international mail from the US is now sent via airmail. Pre-printed airmail etiquettes are no longer produced by the USPS. If USPS customers purchase international stamps from self-service kiosks, from post offices, or online, the letters must then have "AIRMAIL/PAR AVION" written on the address side of the letter. This applies to both First Class Mail International and Priority Mail International services.

== Gallery ==
USPS airmail label

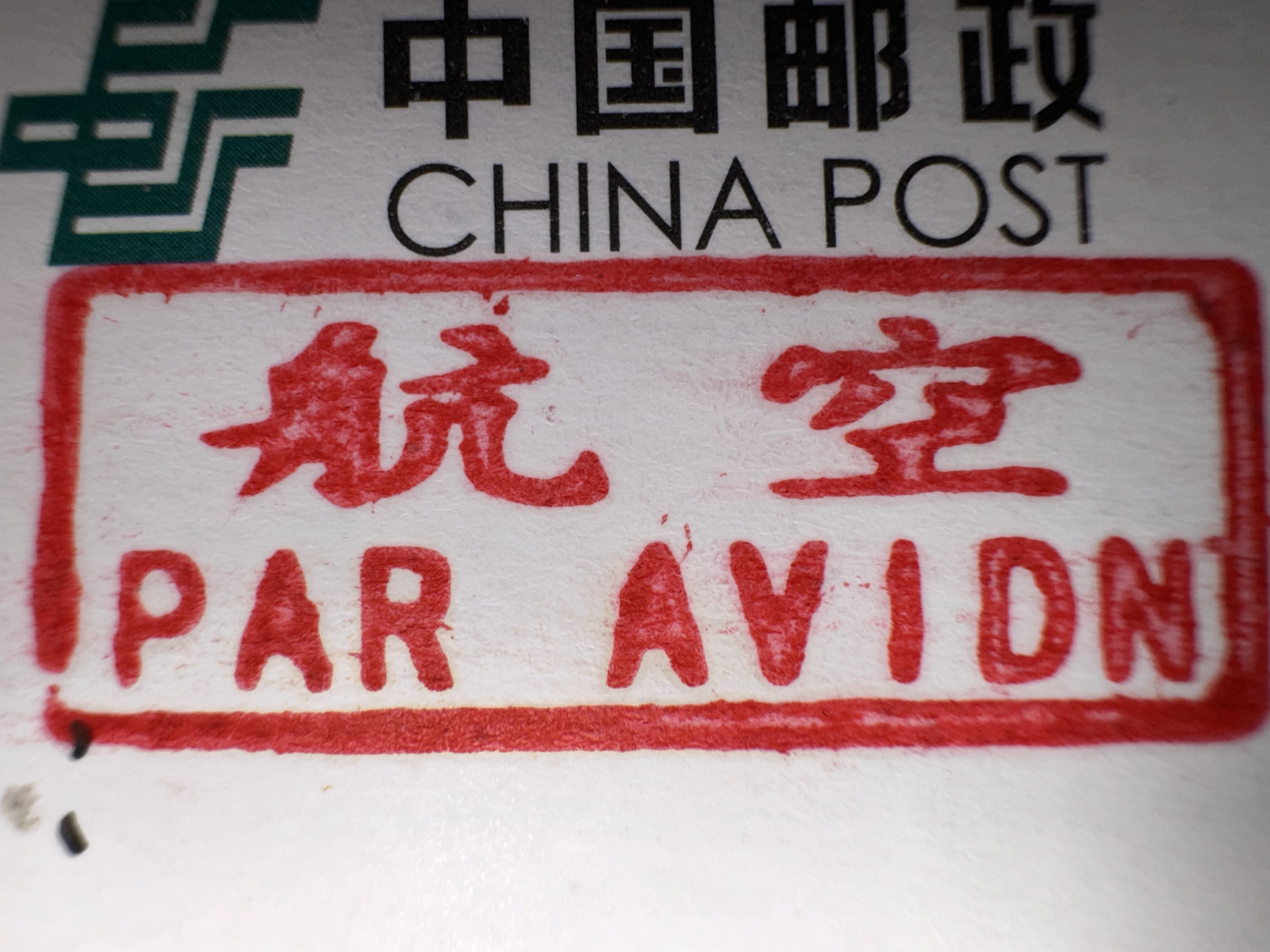
China Post official "par avion" rubber stamp

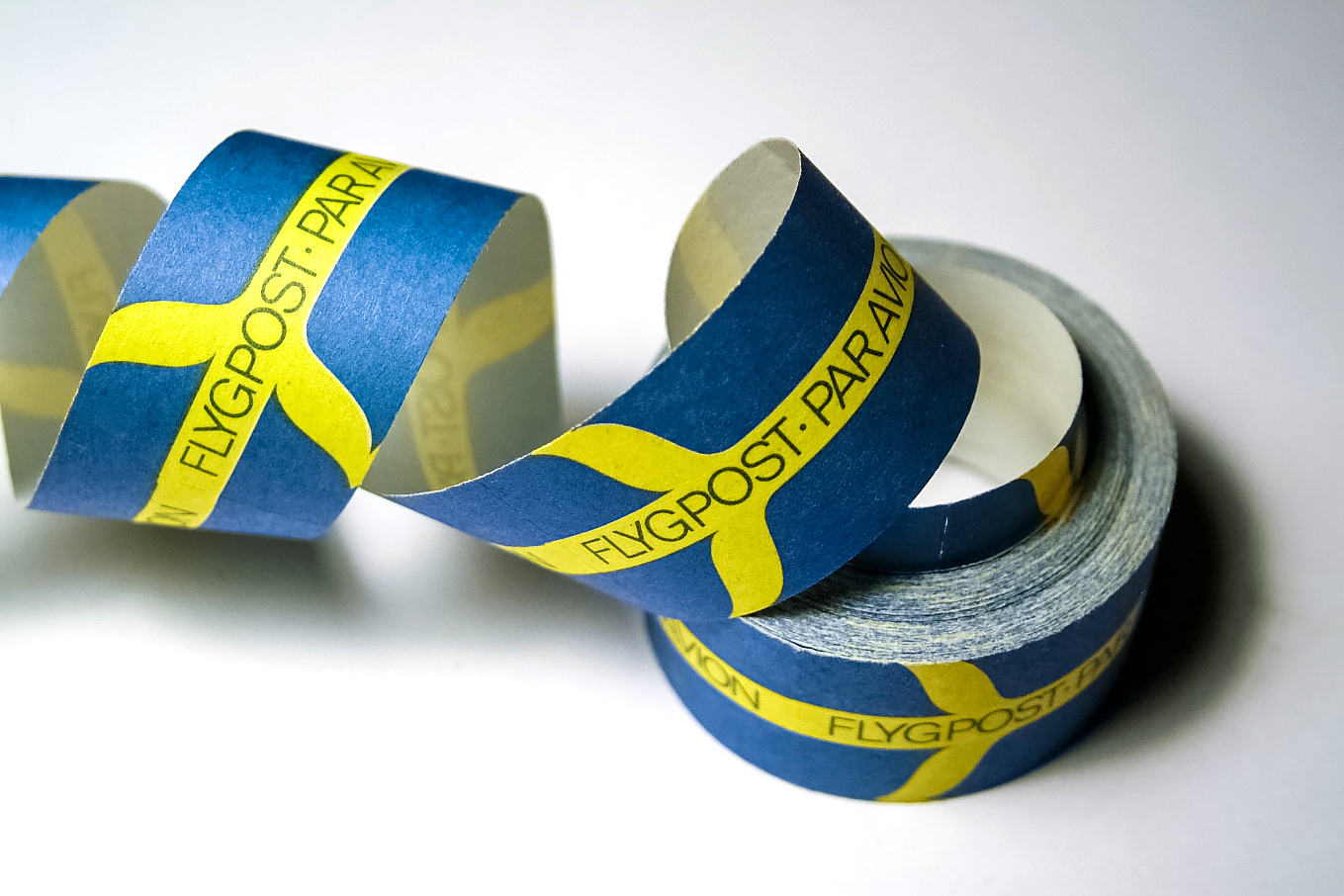
A roll of Swedish Flygpost ("Par Avion") labels from the last part of the 20th century.

== See also ==
- Airmail stamp
- Airmail stamps of Denmark
- List of United States airmail stamps
