= Axel P. Jensen =

Danish painter

Axel Peder Jensen (28 September 1885 – 12 June 1972) was a Danish painter who is remembered above all for his landscapes which added new subjects and stronger colouring to earlier works by the Funen Painters.

== Early life ==
The son of a farmer, he was born in Kerteminde on the island of Funen. After training as a house painter (1900–1904), he attended the Technical School in Aalborg (1903–1907) before studying art at Kristian Zahrtmann's Kunstnernes Studieskoler in Copenhagen (1907–1908). From 1908 to 1910, he was a student with Johan Rohde. He travelled to Paris in 1911 with William Scharff and Olaf Rude.

== Career ==
As a pupil of Zahrtmann and a friend of Olaf Rude, Jais Nielsen and William Scharff, he was one of a small group of Danish modernists who exhibited with De Tretten and later at the Grønningen. Despite numerous portraits in his early years, he was primarily a landscape painter, deeply attached to the countryside where he spent most of his life. He had an acute sense of the changing seasons, the wind and the weather. He spent most of his time in Blokhus in Vendsyssel in the north of Jutland, painting fields, marshes and sand dunes, sometimes with a few figures and perhaps houses, trees or telephone poles to enhance the composition. Like Fritz Syberg before him, he was one of the few Danes who not only painted summer scenes but also the ploughed fields of the autumn and the cold and wet of winter. Any sense of sadness was however usually dispelled by the bright, colourful texture of his works.

In addition to his paintings, Jensen also carried out a series of decorative assignments at the Aarhus Central Post Office (1931) with scenes of the harbour and Jutland's countryside, the reception hall in Frederiksberg Town Hall (1950), and the Aalborghallen indoor arena (1953). He also designed postage stamps including a series celebrating the postal authority's 300th anniversary (1924), an airmail series (1925) and a karavel series (1925).

== Style ==
Despite Zahrtmann's influence, Jensen had a much freer approach to colour. His colourful brushstrokes, even in the shady areas of his paintings, are close to Impressionism. Unlike Rude and Scharff, he was not attracted to Cubism. Inspired by Van Gogh, he later developed tightly knit, rhythmical brushstrokes, producing a distinctly decorative effect. This can be seen above all in his work from 1916 to 1921.

== Notable works ==
- Tørvegravere i Store Vildmose, 1908
- Graa Vinterdag i Vendsyssel, 1910
- Moder og Barn
- Pariserinde med Hunde, 1911
- Gammel Port ved Meudon
- Italiensk Foraar, San Gimignano, 1921
- Vestjysk Landskab
- Sigurd Næsgaard, 1924
- Uvejr over Klitten, 1928
- Pirupshvarre, 1928
- Udkanten af en Klitplantage, 1929
- Klitlandskab med forblæste Graner, 1931
- Vinterdag, Vestrupgaard, 1937
- Vinter ved Vestrupgaard, 1942
- Landskab med Skyer, Store Vildmose, 1957
- Landskab med blomstrende Frugttræer, 1958
- Foraarsdag, Virum

== Awards ==
Jensen was awarded the Eckersberg Medal in 1926 and the Thorvaldsen Medal in 1946.

== Literature ==
- Sine Kildeberg (ed., 2009), Axel P. Jensen: farveklang og penselkraft, Vendsyssel Kunstmuseum. 133 pages. ISBN 978-87-88598-48-3
