= American Air Mail Society =

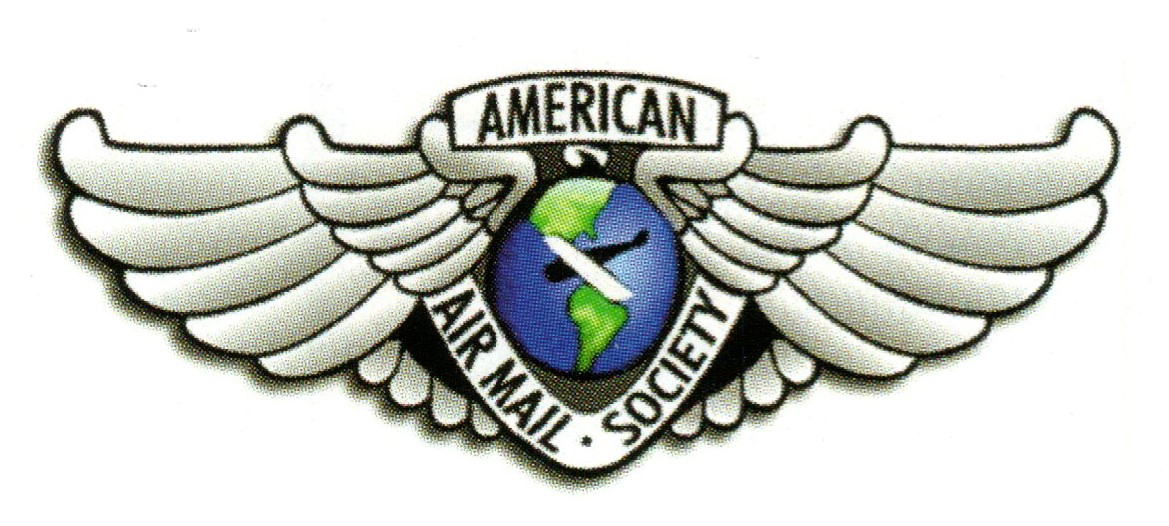
- Founded: August 10, 1923; 103 years ago
- Founders: Joseph A. Steinmetz; Harry A. Truby; George W. Angers
- Type: Educational 501(c)(3)
- Purpose: Aerophilately; Astrophilately
- Location(s): American Air Mail Society; PO Box 1364; West Chatham, MA 02669
- Origins: The Aero Mail Club
- Region served: Worldwide
- Product: education, publications and services
- Method: aerophilatelic publications and services
- Members: 650
- President: David S. Ball
- Vice President: Dan Gribbin
- Publication: The Airpost Journal
- Revenue: Membership fees
- Website: American Air Mail Society
- Formerly called: Aero Philatelic Society of America

The American Air Mail Society (AAMS) is a U.S. nonprofit organization devoted to the collecting and study of airmail and aerophilately.

== History ==
=== The early years ===
America’s first society focused on this facet of collecting was the Aero Mail Club (1913-1915). It had a few dozen members (including future AAMS luminaries) but disbanded with the Great War in Europe raging. When it reconvened in 1923 as the Aero Philatelic Society of America and renamed the American Air Mail Society (in 1926) it had become a fixture in the hobby. The name was changed because the initials APS was also used by another stamp organization with an even longer pedigree.

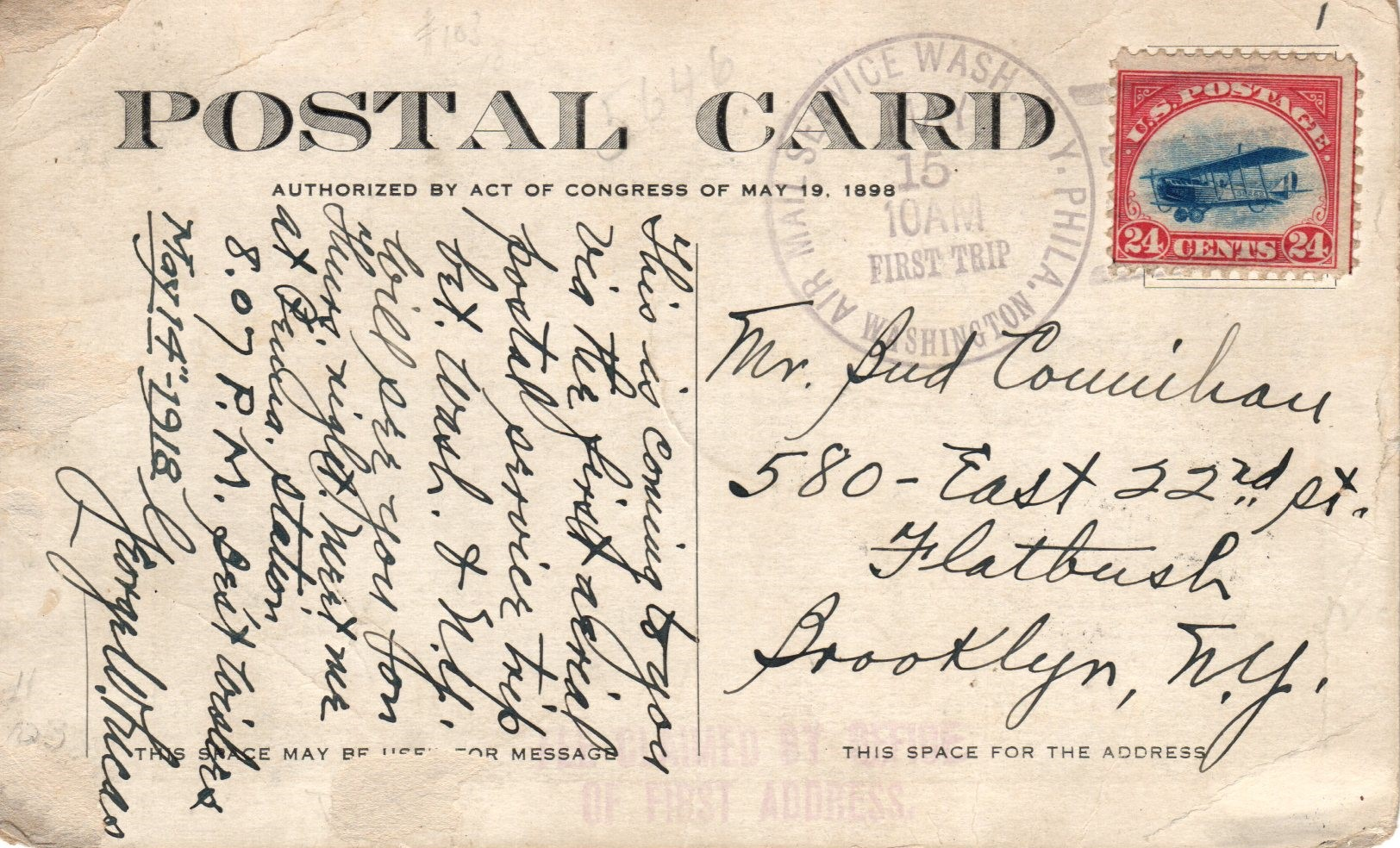
May 15, 1918 First trip from Washington

Along the way there have been at least two dozen aerophilatelic societies in the United States alone from The Aero Philatelist, Jack Knight, Motor City and Gotham Air Mail Societies, John Wise, Aerophilatelic Federation of the Americas and Air Label Associates. There have also been many publications including Aero News, The Air Mail Collector, Airpost Journal, Aero Newsletter, American Post Journal and Jack Knight Air Log. Of these only the APJ (first published in 1929) remains.

While the concentration was certainly on achievements and activity in the United States, the society had Associate Editors in 29 countries including France, Great Britain, Switzerland Germany, Austria, Canada, Italy, Greece, Poland, Iceland, Holland, Sweden, Czechoslovakia, Morocco, Japan, Philippines, Siam, Persia, Russia, Mexico, Columbia, Chile, Argentina, Brazil, Cuba, Panama and the Canal Zone.

=== The war of 1929 ===
Holcomb York who owned The Berkshire Exchange, published the first U.S. airmail catalogue and The Airpost Journal, decried AAMS infatuation with covers bearing souvenir or commemorative cachets that were never flown on an inaugural or historical flight. His nemesis was another early airmail dealer, Donald Dickason.

The argument of official vs. unofficial airmail cachets would drag on for the next few years splintering the collecting community. In 1931 to widespread surprise, York and Dickason announced a merger of business interests. In the more than 85 years since the AAMS Catalogue was first published, no less than 47 different ways to collect have been listed. They include Airport Dedications, Balloon Posts, Air Labels, Airmail First Day Covers and Aerial Propaganda.

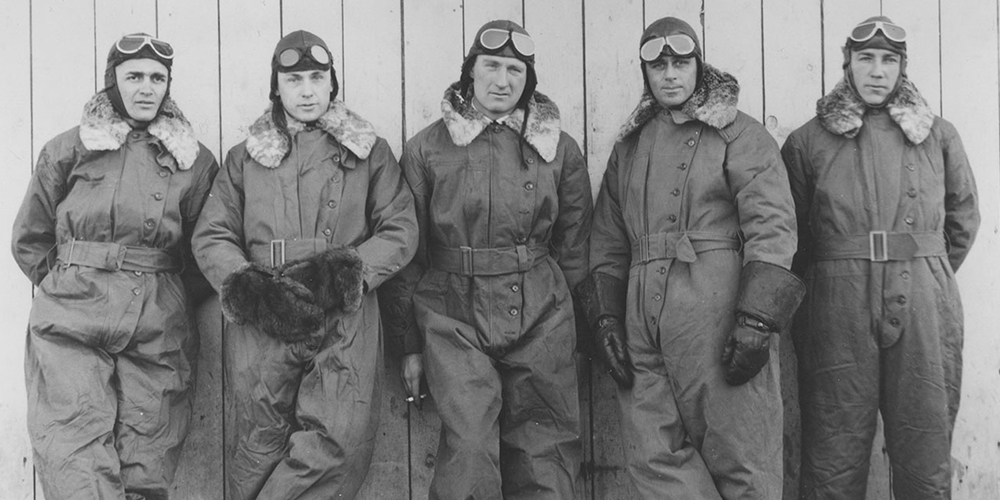
Early government airmail pilots

=== Documenting aviation progress ===
By the second Annual Convention in 1931, the American Air Mail Society had nearly 1,000 members. It was highly regarded and those attending were received by President Herbert Hoover in the White House. In a letter to Georges Angers in 1943, President Franklin Roosevelt wrote:

As a pioneer in the field of aero-philately, your organization has long since achieved prominence as a national philatelic society and today stands as a glowing tribute to the foresight of its founders. It likewise serves as a monument to the unselfish efforts of those members who have labored so tirelessly these years in its behalf.

John P. V. Heinmuller was President of the Longines-Wittnauer Watch Company and Chief Timer for the National Aeronautic Association (NAA) member of the International Aviation Federation (FAI). He collected aviation event envelopes and served as President of AAMS. He certified and befriended many notable people, including Eddie Rickenbacker, Igor Sikorsky, Gen. Francesco de Pinedo, Adm. Richard E. Byrd, Charles Lindbergh, Clarence Chamberlin, Amelia Earhart, John Henry Mears and Charles B.D. Collyer, Wiley Post and Harold Gatty, Clyde Pangborn and Hugh Herndon, Roscoe Turner, Jimmie Mattern and Bennett Griffin, Dick Merrill, and Howard Hughes.

=== A new century ===
From 1918 to 1975 using airmail was a premium service. Initially, airmail struggled to compete with trains for speed and reliability. With the subsidy of government contracts for airlines, however, airmail quickly excelled. For the 20th anniversary of government airmail as celebrated as National Air Mail Week, 16.2 million letters took to the skies. By the mid-1970s the United States Postal Service determined that First Class mail would travel by whatever the most expeditious method available without additional expense.

In 2023 the American Air Mail Society turned 100. As one of the oldest and largest aerophilatelic societies in the world, AAMS continues to support collectors with original research, the AAMS Catalogue (now in the 7th Ed), and reference works on gliders, rockets, balloons, as well as planes.

The next step is to partner of other philatelic organizations to broaden and deepen knowledge in the field. As a founding member of Collaboration Crew, AAMS explores how to maximize joint opportunities like the International Digital Membership (IDM). Sponsored by the International Federation of Aerophilatelic Societies (FISA), members of one of several participating organizations can join as associate members of other societies for a nominal sum.

== Philatelic services ==
AAMS offers numerous services to its members:

- Airpost Journal - bi-monthly magazine
- Guest Zoom lectures – every other month
- AAMS Mail Auction – quarterly
- Zoom Society Auction – every other month
- Gratis classified ads in APJ
- AAMS Hall of Fame
- APS nationally accredited judges for consultation
- Annual Members Convention

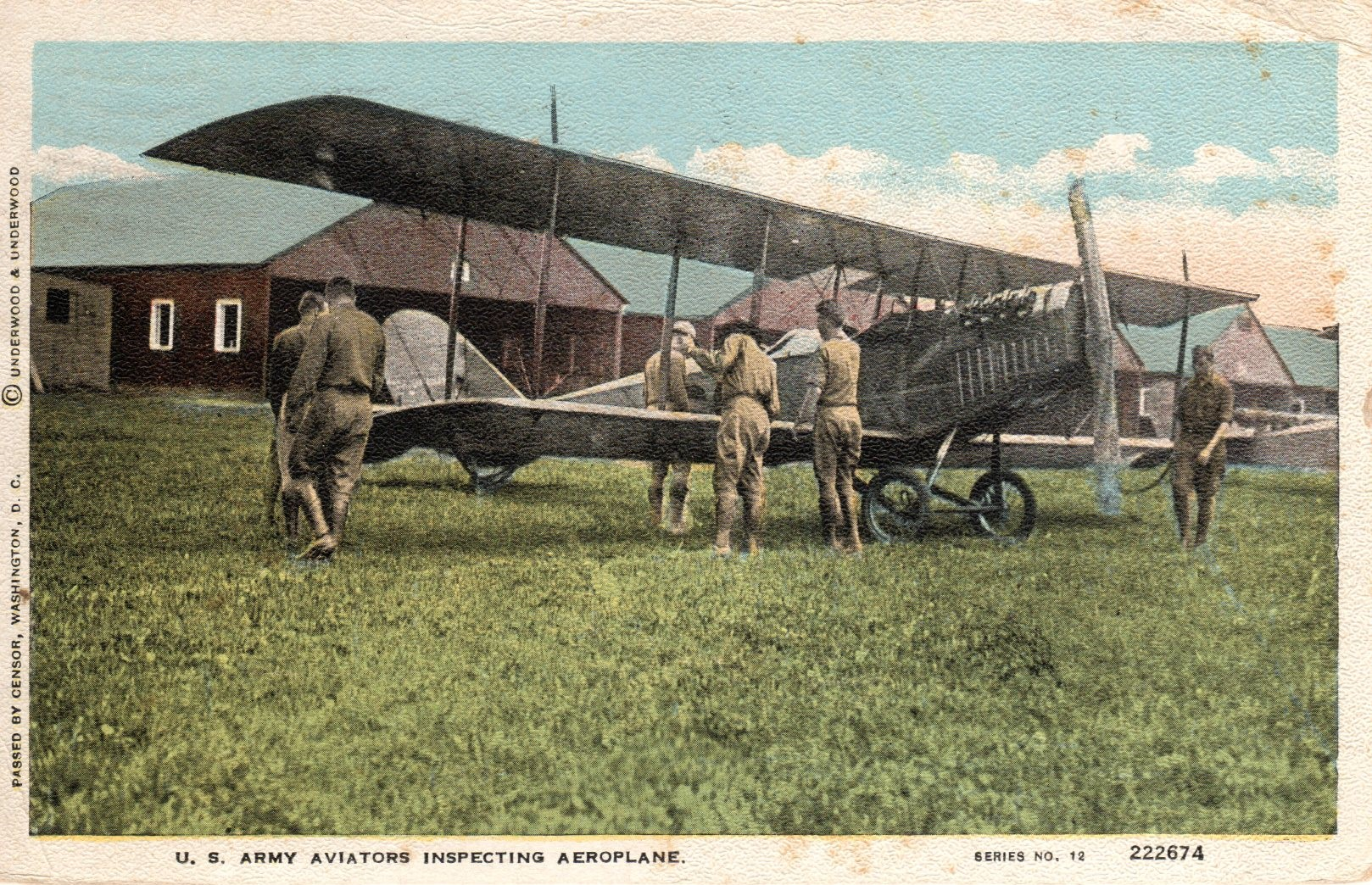
First government airmail used military aircraft and personnel

=== Exhibiting at shows ===
Aerophilatelic exhibits are composed of postal documents transmitted by air and bearing evidence of having been flown. An aerophilatelic exhibit is a study of the development, operation or other defined scope of airmail services, presenting directly relevant items and documenting the treatment and analysis of the aerophilatelic material. Aerophilately is aeropostal history; i.e., the postal history aspect of airmail. Defined above, its focus is the development, operation or other defined scope of airmail services.

=== Honors and awards ===
- Aerophilatelic Hall of Fame
- AAMS Aerophilatelic Research Award
- Walter J. Conrath Memorial Award
- AAMS President’s Award
- Lee Downer Award
- Blumenthal Award
- Gatchell Award
- Kingdom Award

== See also ==
- Aerophilately
