= Nancy Stahl =

American illustrator

- Education: University of Arizona, Art Center College of Design
- Known for: illustration illustrator

Nancy Stahl is an American illustrator.

Stahl was an inductee into the Illustrators Hall of Fame by the Society of Illustrators in 2012.

== Early life and education ==
Stahl was born in Long Island, New York. She attended the University of Arizona and the Art Center College of Design in Los Angeles.

== Early work ==
Although she would be recognized as a pioneer of digital illustration, Stahl began her illustration career in 1971 working in gouache, and developing a bold "poster style" which she credits as being influenced by Ludwig Hohlwein, and more generally by the English railway and underground posters of Edward McKnight Kauffer

In the late 1980s, Stahl was invited by Charlex (also known as CHRLX since 1998) to come in after hours to learn how to create digital art on their mainframe computers. Digital image manipulation was in its infancy at the time and the artist recalled that "you'd go back to this hazmat type of room—you know, those computer rooms where the guys would wear white and it was freezing cold—one huge room, full of tapes, and you'd load your tape".

== Digital work ==
Stahl has designed postage stamps for the United States Postal Service and in addition to her stamp illustrations, she has been featured by print publications such as Time Magazine, The New York Times, and The Wall Street Journal and many others.

Stahl has been an adviser for Adobe along with other select digital artists, test-driving the unreleased Adobe Photoshop versions. Stahl was featured in CA, Step-by-Step, Print, and Peachpit Press Illustrator Wow and Painter Wow books.

=== As an educator ===
Stahl has been an instructor in the Independent Study master's degree program at Hartford Art School, Syracuse University, and taught at the School of Visual Arts and the Fashion Institute of Technology.

Wacom used Stahl as a spokesperson for their professional pen tablet and recorded videos of her demonstrating the most advanced techniques of their recent product.

== Honors and awards ==
- Hall of Fame Society of Illustrators inducted 2012
- Chairman of The Society of Illustrators Annual Exhibition (2001)
