= Stuart Rossiter Trust =

The Stuart Rossiter Trust is a British charitable trust (registered charity number 292076) that was created by the will of the philatelist and postal historian Stuart Rossiter and subsequently the will of his mother.

The trust was established in 1985 and has become a prolific publisher of books about postal history and also provides financial assistance to the publication of other postal history books and provides grants for research in to postal history. There are six trustees.

The principal objectives of the Trust are:

- To promote research into the history of the postal services
- To publish and sell our postal history books and publications in this area of study.

The Trustees have said that they "invite applications for funding from anyone, whether professional or amateur, with an interest in conducting original research into the history of written communications with a view to publishing their findings".

The trustees have also instigated an annual lecture in Stuart Rossiter's memory on a postal history theme. The 2022 speaker has been announced as Simon Richards who will talk on "The Influence of Military History on Postal History: Anglo-French rivalry in the Caribbean".

== Selected publications ==
- An Introduction to the Postal History of Denmark 1624-1950 by David Cornelius 2004
- British Consulate Post Office at Bangkok 1855-1885 by Michel House 2021
- Suffolk Postal History and Postal Markings to 1844 by Tom Slemons 2018
- Postmen at War by E T Vallance 2017
- Crisis in the Cayman Islands Post Office by Graham Booth 2020
- British Printed Papers by Post 1836-1876 by Gavin Fryer 2019
