= Fédération Internationale des Sociétés Aérophilatéliques =

Fédération Internationale des Sociétés Aérophilatéliques (International Federation of Aerophilatelic Societies), more commonly known as FISA, is the umbrella association for aerophilatelic societies. FISA represents and promotes aerophilately and astrophilately for its collectors within the international world of philately. The FISA Bulletin is an online only philatelic newsletter. Every other year FISA holds an annual Congress, usually during a major national or international philatelic exhibition. Several exhibitions are run under the auspices of FISA where air mail material can be exhibited. Members include several philatelic societies such as, the American Air Mail Society.
