= Airmail =

Service which transports mail by air

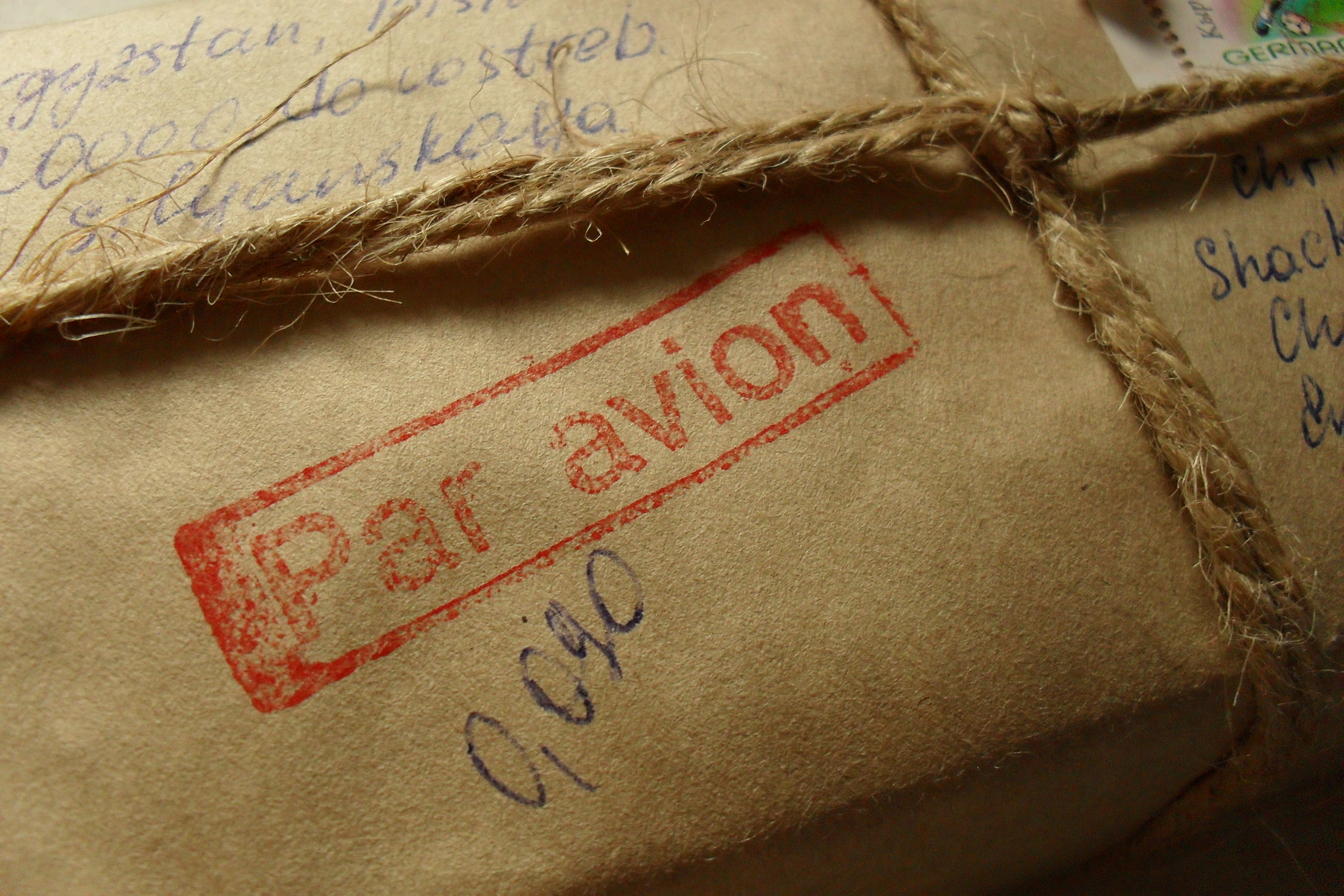
Airmail instructional mark on a parcel from Kyrgyzstan

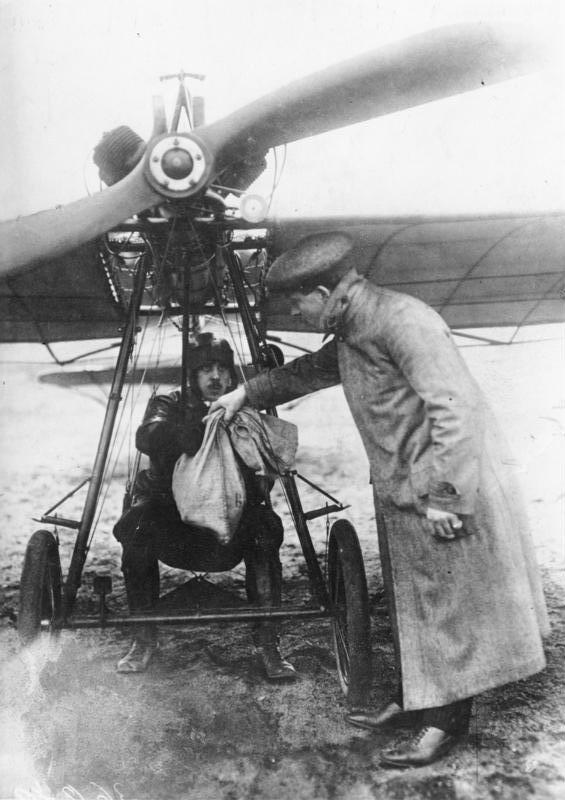
1912 German airmail between Bork and Brück

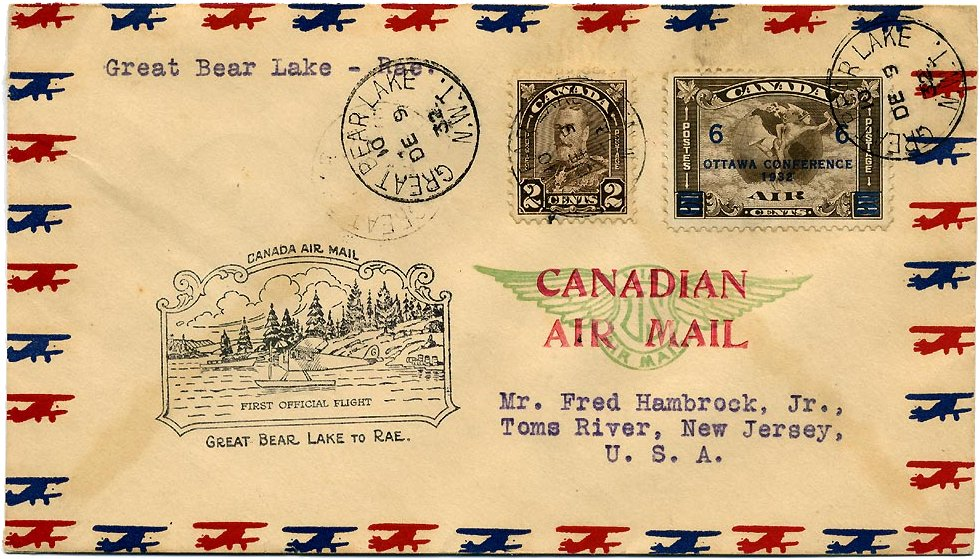
A cover carried on a 1932 first flight in the north woods of Canada, with a cachet and franked with both a regular and an airmail stamp

Airmail (or air mail) is a mail transport service branded and sold on the basis of at least one leg of its journey being by air. Airmail items typically arrive more quickly than surface mail, and usually cost more to send. Airmail may be the only option for sending mail to some destinations, such as overseas, if the mail cannot wait the time it would take to arrive by ship, sometimes weeks. The Universal Postal Union adopted comprehensive rules for airmail at its 1929 Postal Union Congress in London. Since the official language of the Universal Postal Union is French, airmail items worldwide are often marked Par avion, literally: "by airplane".

For about the first half century of its existence, transportation of mail via aircraft was usually categorized and sold as a separate service (airmail) from surface mail. Today it is often the case that mail service is categorized and sold according to transit time alone, with mode of transport (land, sea, air) being decided on the back end in dynamic intermodal combinations. Thus even "regular" mail may make part of its journey on an aircraft. Such "air-speeded" mail is different from nominal airmail in its branding, price, and priority of service.

== History ==
=== Early airmails ===
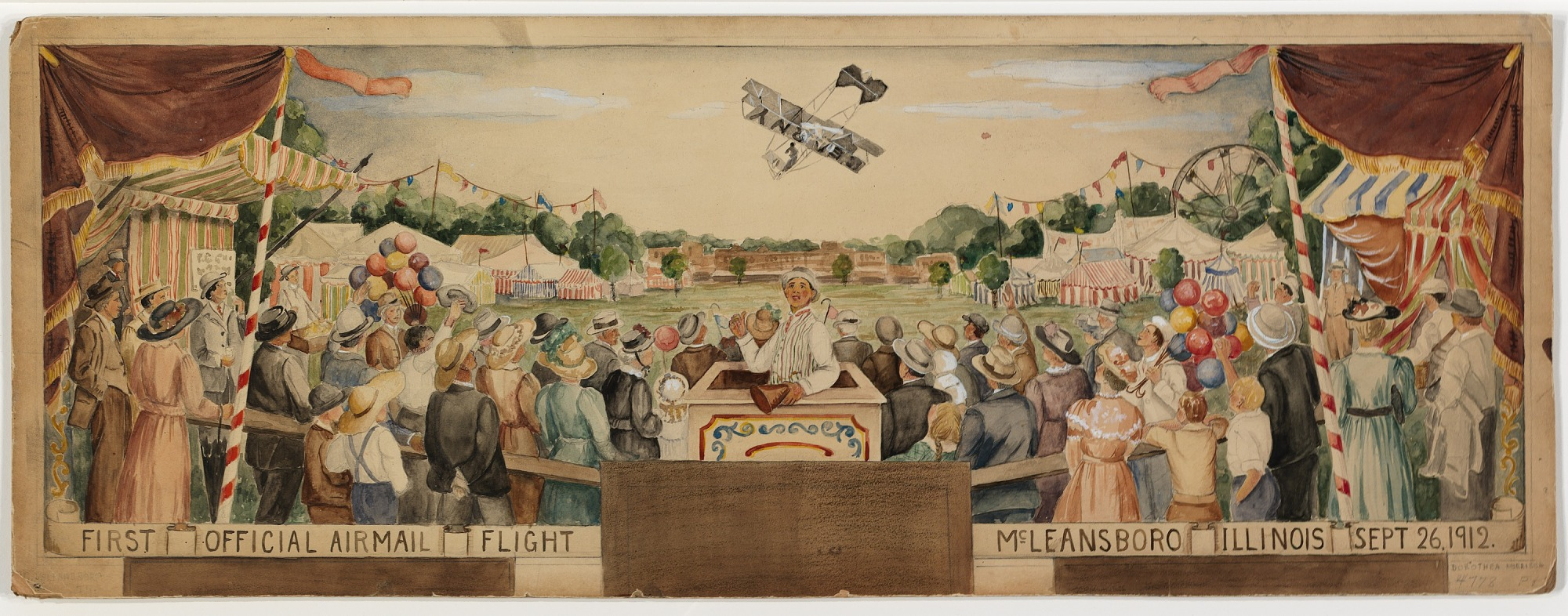
Study for The First Official Airmail Flight (1941), mural by Dorothea Mierisch at the post office in McLeansboro, Illinois

Specific instances of a letter being delivered by air long predate the introduction of airmail as a regularly scheduled service available to the general public.

Although homing pigeons had long been used to send messages (an activity known as pigeon mail), the first mail to be carried by an air vehicle was on January 7, 1785, on a hot air balloon flight from Dover to France near Calais. It was flown by Jean-Pierre Blanchard and John Jeffries. The letter was written by an American Loyalist William Franklin to his son William Temple Franklin who was serving in a diplomatic role in Paris with his grandfather Benjamin Franklin.

During the first aerial flight in North America by balloon on January 9, 1793, from Philadelphia to Deptford, New Jersey, Jean-Pierre Blanchard carried a personal letter from George Washington to be delivered to the owner of whatever property Blanchard happened to land on, making the flight the first delivery of air mail in the United States. The first official air mail delivery in the United States took place on August 17, 1859, when John Wise piloted a balloon starting in Lafayette, Indiana, with a destination of New York. Weather issues forced him to land near Crawfordsville, Indiana, and the mail reached its final destination via train. In 1959, the U.S. Postal Service issued a 7 cent stamp commemorating the event.

Balloons also carried mail out of Paris and Metz during the Franco-Prussian War (1870), drifting over the heads of the Germans besieging those cities. Balloon mail was also carried on an 1877 flight in Nashville, Tennessee.

== Introduction of the aeroplane ==
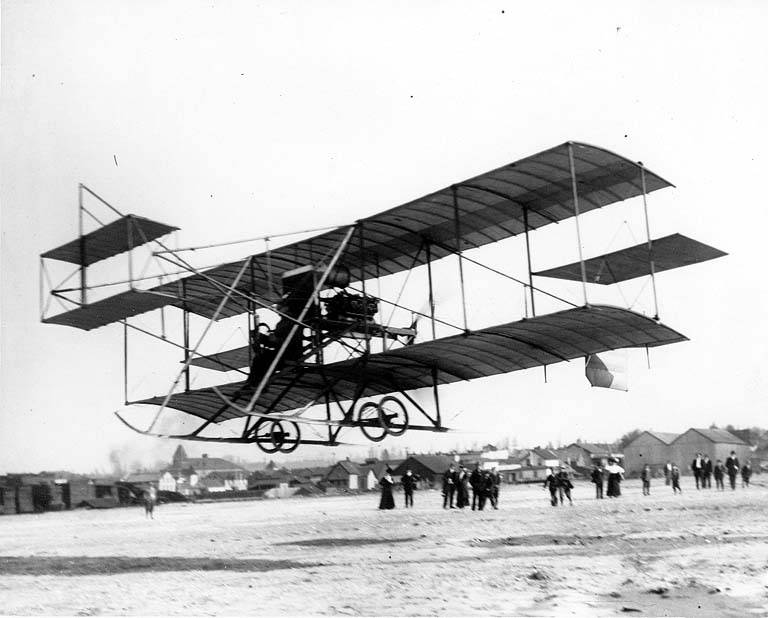
Fred J. Wiseman with the Wiseman-Cooke, the first American airmail plane

Starting in 1903 the introduction of the aeroplane generated immediate interest in using them for mail transport. An unofficial airmail flight (Reviewed and recognized retrospectively by the Smithsonian Institution when Fredrick Joseph Wiseman was 76 years old) was conducted by Fred J. Wiseman as an amateur pilot in the Wiseman-Cooke, his self-taught built aircraft, who carried three officially stamped letters between Petaluma and Santa Rosa, California, on February 18, 1911.

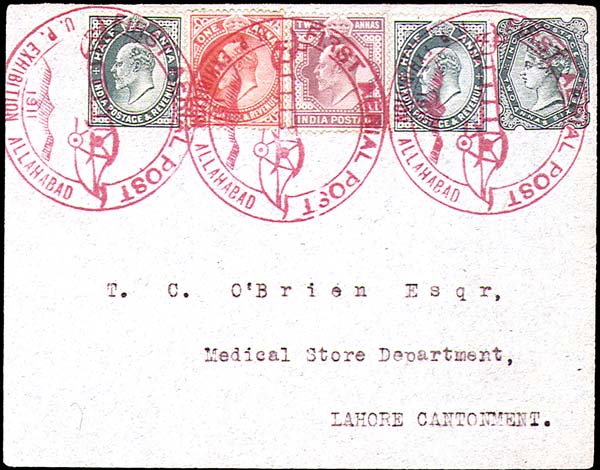
Allahabad cover flown on the world's first aerial post in 1911

The world's first official airmail flight came the same day, at a large exhibition in the United Provinces of Agra and Oudh, British India. The organizer of the aviation display, Sir Walter Windham, was able to secure permission from the postmaster general in India to operate an airmail service in order to generate publicity for the exhibition and to raise money for charity. Mail from people across the region was gathered in at Holy Trinity Church and the first airmail flight was piloted by Henri Pequet, who flew 6,500 letters a distance of 13 km (8.1 mi) from Allahabad to Naini—the nearest station on the Bombay-Calcutta line to the exhibition. The letters bore an official frank "First Aerial Post, U.P. Exhibition, Allahabad. 1911". The aircraft used was a Humber-Sommer biplane, and it made the journey in thirteen minutes.

The first official American airmail delivery was made on September 23, 1911, by pilot Earle Ovington under the authority of the United States Post Office Department.

The first official air mail in Australia was carried by French pilot Maurice Guillaux. On July 16–18, 1914, he flew his Blériot XI aircraft from Melbourne to Sydney, a distance of 584 miles (940 km), carrying 1785 specially printed postcards, some Lipton's Tea and some O.T. Lemon juice. At the time, this was the longest such flight in the world.

=== Scheduled services ===
The world's first scheduled airmail post service took place in the United Kingdom between the London suburb of Hendon, North London, and the Postmaster General's office in Windsor, Berkshire, on September 9, 1911, as part of the celebrations for King George V's coronation and at the suggestion of Sir Walter Windham, who based his proposal on the successful experiment he had overseen in India.

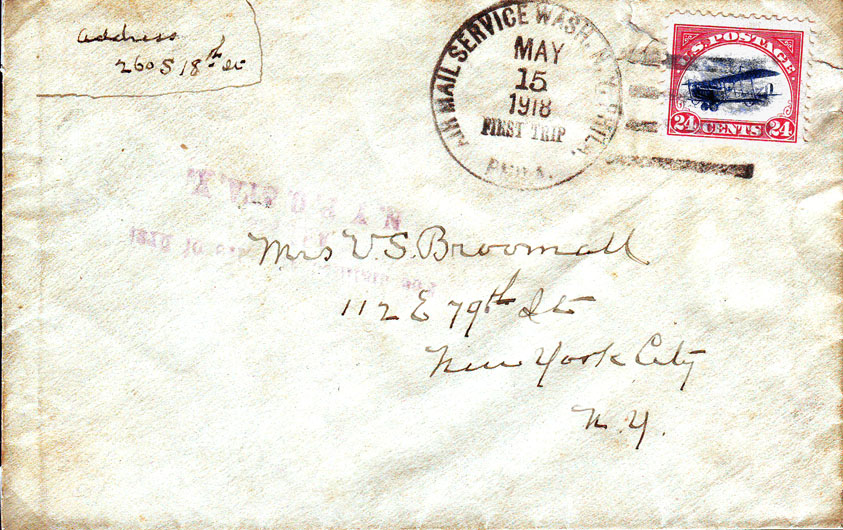
Cover flown on the first day of scheduled Air Mail Service in the U.S. and franked with the first U.S. Air Mail stamp, the 24 Cent "Jenny" (C-3). Cancel: "Air Mail Service – Wash. N.Y. Phila. May 15, 1918 – First Trip Phila." (CDS)

The service ran for just under a month, transporting 35 bags of mail in 16 flights; four pilots operated the aircraft including Gustav Hamel, who flew the first service in his Blériot, covering the 21 miles between Hendon and Windsor in just 18 minutes. The service was eventually terminated due to constant and severe delays caused by bad weather conditions. Similar services were intermittently run in other countries before the war, including in Germany, France and Japan, where airmail provision was briefly established in 1912, only to meet with similar practical difficulties.

The range, speed and lifting capacity of aircraft were transformed through technological innovation during the war, allowing the first practical air mail services to finally become a reality when the war ended. For instance, the first regularly scheduled airmail service in the United States was inaugurated on May 15, 1918. The route, which ran between Washington, D.C., and New York City, with an intermediate stop in Philadelphia, Pennsylvania, was designed by aviation pioneer Augustus Post. The field used for this service is marked by a plaque in West Potomac Park. In 1925, the U.S. Postal service issued contracts to fly airmail between designated points. By 1931, 85% of domestic airline revenue was from airmail.

In Germany, dirigibles of the 1920s and 1930s were used extensively to carry airmail; it was known as Zeppelin mail, or dirigible mail. The German Zeppelins were especially visible in this role, and many countries issued special stamps for use on Zeppelin mail.

The 1928 book So Disdained by Nevil Shute—a novel based on this author's deep interest in and thorough knowledge of aviation—includes a monologue by a veteran pilot, preserving the atmosphere of these pioneering times: "We used to fly on the Paris route, from Hounslow to Le Bourget and get through as best as you could. Later we moved on to Croydon. (...) We carried the much advertised Air Mails. That meant the machines had to fly whether there were passengers to be carried or not. It was left to the discretion of the pilot whether or not the flight should be cancelled in bad weather; the pilots were dead keen on flying in the most impossible conditions. Sanderson got killed this way at Douinville. And all he had in the machine was a couple of picture postcards from trippers in Paris, sent to their families as a curiosity. That was the Air Mail. No passengers or anything—just the mail".

=== International services ===
In the aftermath of the war, the Royal Engineers (Postal Section) and the Royal Air Force pioneered the first scheduled international airmail service between Folkestone, Kent and Cologne, Germany. The service operated between December 1918 and mid-1919; its purpose was to provide troops of the British Army stationed in Germany with a fast mail service. (see more at British Forces Post Office) Throughout the 1920s the Royal Air Force continued to develop air routes through the Middle East.

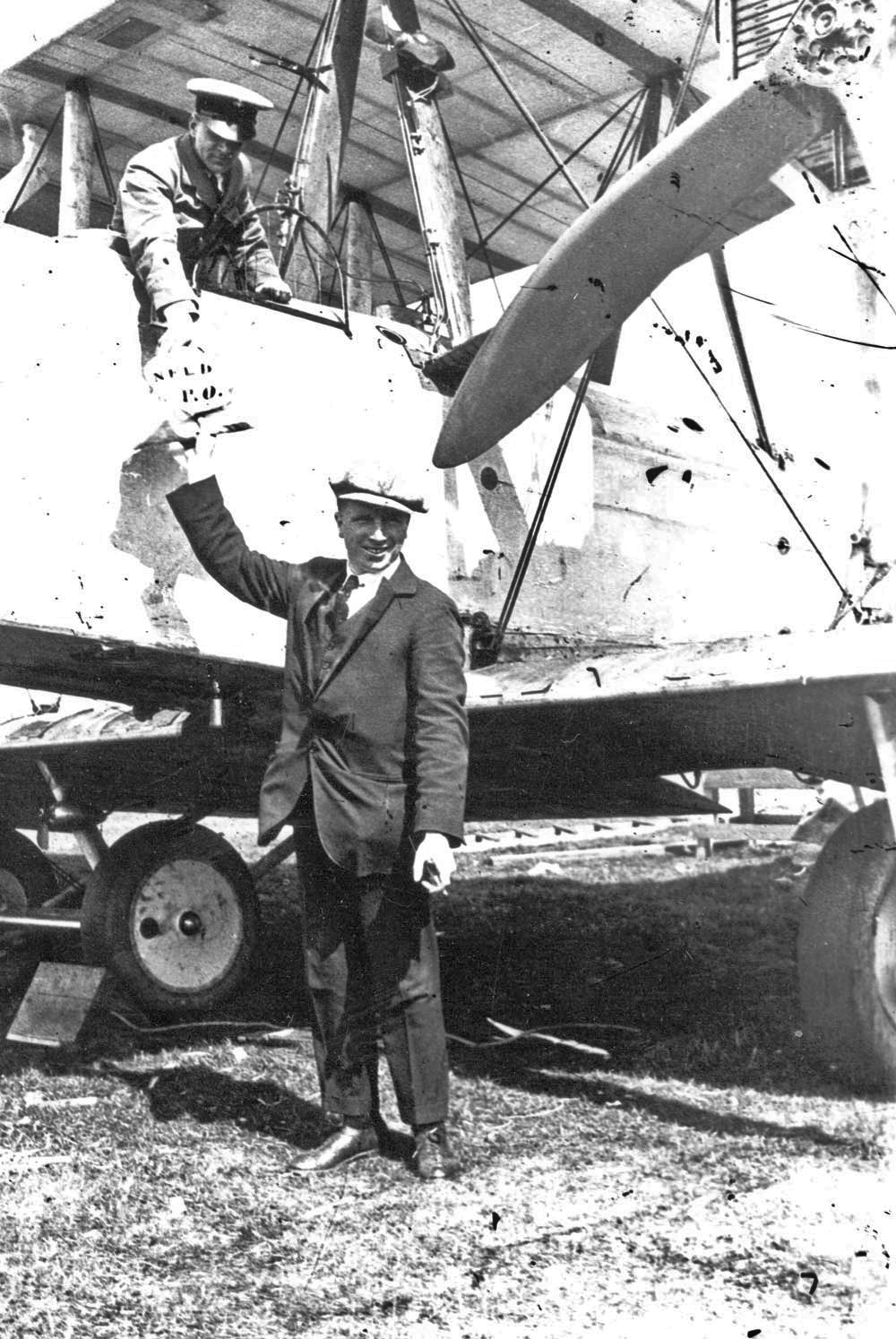
Alcock and Brown taking on mail

On 25 December 1918, the Latécoère Airlines (later becoming the famed Aéropostale) became the first civilian international airmail service, when mail was flown from Toulouse, France, to Barcelona, Spain. Less than 2 months later, on 19 February 1919, the airmail service was extended to Casablanca, Morocco, making the Latécoère Airlines the first transcontinental airmail service. In June 1919, Alcock and Brown completed the first transatlantic airmail flight.

The first airmail service established officially by an airline occurred in Colombia, South America, on 19 October 1920. Scadta, the first airline of the country, flew landing river by river delivering mail in its destinations. Australia's first airmail contract was awarded to Norman (later Sir) Brearley's Western Australian Airlines (WAA). The first airmail was carried between Geraldton and Derby in Western Australia on December 5, 1921.

== Philately ==
Since stamp collecting was already a well-developed hobby by this time, collectors followed developments in airmail service closely, and went to some trouble to find out about the first flights between various destinations, and to get letters onto them. The authorities often used special cachets on the covers, and in many cases the pilot would sign them as well.

The first stamps designated specifically for airmail were issued by Italy in 1917, and used on experimental flights; they were produced by overprinting special delivery stamps. Austria also overprinted stamps for airmail in March 1918, soon followed by the first definitive stamp for airmail, issued by the United States in May 1918.

== Air-speeded ==
A postal service may sometimes opt to transport some regular mail by air, perhaps because other transportation is unavailable. It is usually impossible to know this by examining an envelope, and such items are not considered "airmail." Generally, airmail would take a guaranteed and scheduled flight and arrive first, while air-speeded mail would wait for a non-guaranteed and merely available flight and would arrive later than normal airmail.

== Names ==
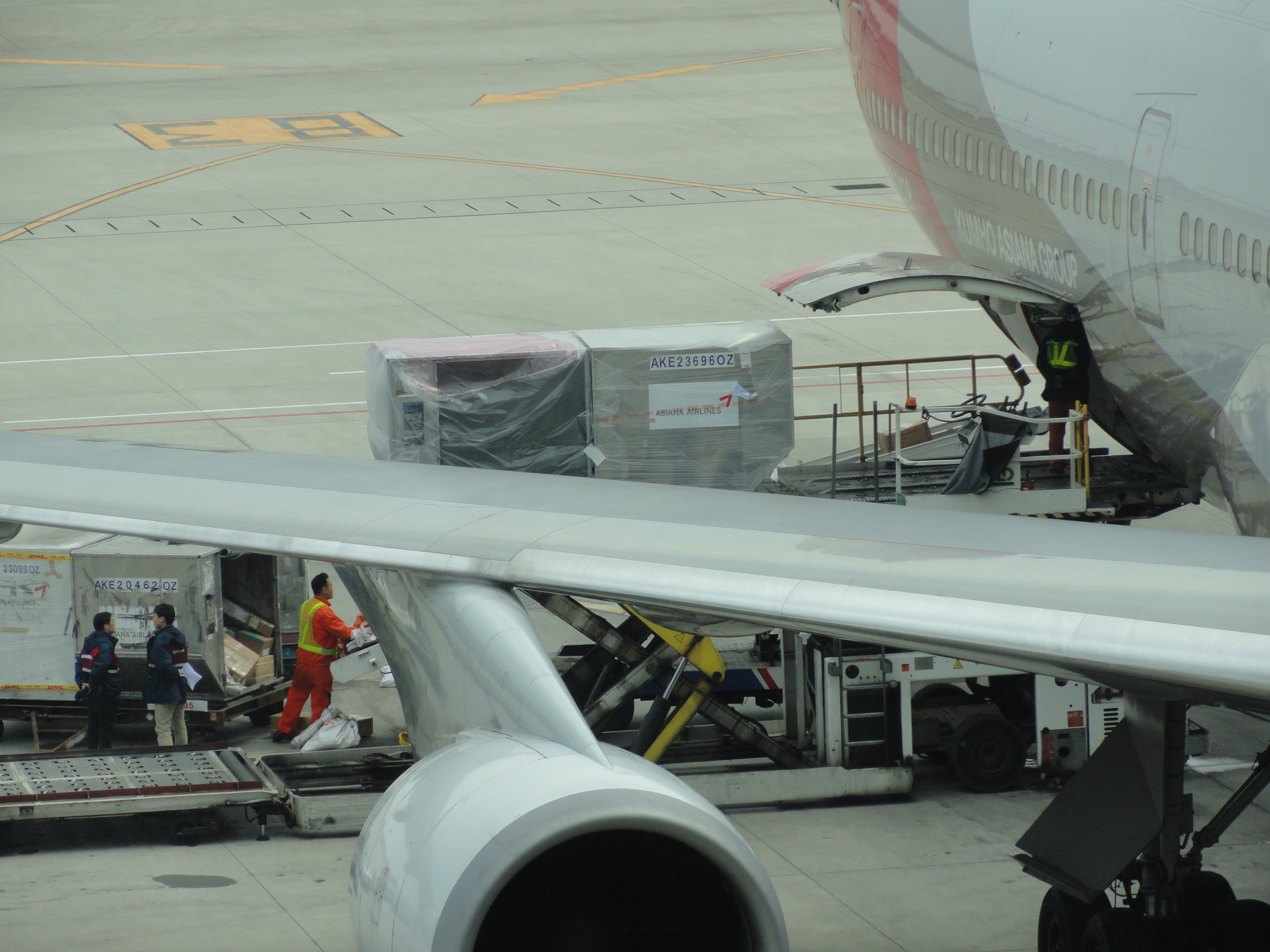
Airmail being loaded onto an Asiana Airlines Boeing 747-400

A letter sent via airmail may be called an aerogramme, aerogram, air letter or simply airmail letter. However, aerogramme and aerogram may also refer to a specific kind of airmail letter which is its own envelope; see aerogram.

Some forms of airletter, such as aerogram, may forbid enclosure of other material so as to keep the weight down.

The choice to send a letter by air is indicated either by a handwritten note on the envelope, by the use of special labels called airmail etiquettes (blue stickers with the words "air mail" in French and in the home language), or by the use of specially-marked envelopes. Special airmail stamps may also be available, or required; the rules vary in different countries.

The study of airmail is known as aerophilately.

== Media ==
A 1945 newsreel covering various firsts in human flight, including U.S. Airmail footage

== See also ==
- Airmail etiquette
- Air Mail scandal
- Airmail stamps of Denmark
- American Air Mail Society
- Hybrid mail
- LAPE
- Mail plane
- Nellie Brimberry
- Onionskin
- Timeline of air cargo
- United States airmail service
- V-mail

== References and sources ==
=== Sources ===
- Fernandez, Ronald (1983), Excess Profits: The Rise of United Technologies, Boston: Addison-Wesley, ISBN 9780201104844.
- Richard McP. Cabeen, Standard Handbook of Stamp Collecting (Collectors Club, 1979), pp. 207–221
- Schiff, Stacy. Benjamin Franklin and the Birth of America. Bloomsbury, 2006.
