= Aerophilately =

Airmail-related stamp study

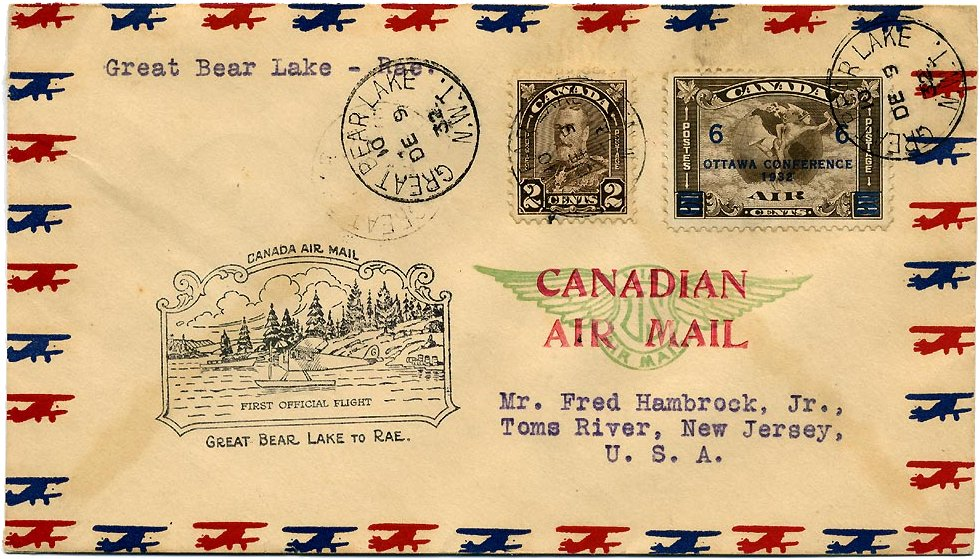
This 1932 Canadian "first official flight" cover, Great Bear Lake to Rae (now Behchoko), includes both a special cachet and a surcharged airmail stamp.

Aerophilately is the branch of philately that specializes in the study of airmail. Philatelists have observed the development of mail transport by air from its beginning, and all aspects of airmail service have been extensively studied and documented by specialists.

== Scope ==
The scope of aerophilately includes:

- airmail postage stamps, both official and unofficial (see list of US airmail postage here)
- other types of labels (such as airmail etiquettes)
- postal documents transmitted by air
- postal markings related to air transport
- rates and routes, particularly first flights and other "special" flights
- mail recovered from aircraft accidents and other incidents (crash covers)

While most of the study of airmail assumes transport by fixed-wing aircraft, the fields of balloon mail, dirigible mail, zeppelin mail, missile mail, and rocket mail are active subspecialties. Astrophilately, the study of mail in space, is a related area.

== Organizations ==
International Federation of Aerophilatelic Societies (FISA) is the umbrella organization for aerophilately though aerophilatelists have formed a number of organizations around the world; many of them put out a variety of specialized publications. Federation Internationale de Philatelie (FIP) also maintains a commission.

== See also ==
- Airmail
- Airmail stamps of Denmark
- Airmails of the United States
- Fitzgerald Collection
- List of United States airmail stamps
- Scott Collection – a collection of British internal airmails
- Seymour Collection – a collection relating to the de Havilland Comet.
