= Airmail stamps of Denmark =

Danish postage stamps for mail transported by air

Denmark issued ten definitive airmail stamps between 1925 and 1934 in two distinct series. The 1st series, commonly called The Plow and Airplane was first issued in June 1925. These stamps were designed by Danish artist Axel Peder Jensen (1885–1972). The 2nd series was issued on June 9, 1934, and depicted an airplane over Copenhagen. The second series remained in use until after World War II.

== 1925 Plow and Airplane series ==
The 1925 series comprises Denmark's 1st airmail stamps and their issue corresponded with the opening of Kastrup airport in Copenhagen and the carriage of regular airmails by Det Danske Luftfartselskab, the Danish national airline. The 1925 series was issued in denominations of 10, 15, 25, 50 øre and 1 krone. All the values were reissued in the 1930s.

Summary of 1925 Plow and Airplane Series
Denomination	Issue dates	Plate numbers and quantities printed	Primary purpose
10 øre	June 17, 1925, February 15, 1933	273J (151,000), 451J (18,450)	The 10 øre paid internal and Nordic airmail letter surcharges (1921) and the European airmail postcard surcharge (1925)
15 øre	May 14, 1926, June 10, 1931, February 15, 1933	293A (107,250), 411N (27,170), 451J (23,460)	The 15 øre paid European airmail letter and postcard surcharges (1926)
25 øre	June 17, 1925, February 15, 1933	273J (150,000), 451J (25,620)	The 25 øre paid the 1925 European Airmail letter surcharge
50 øre	October 23, 1929, February 15, 1933	365Z (49,770), 451J (12,690)	The 50 øre paid the North American Airmail letter surcharge (1927) and combination European rates
1 krone	October 23, 1929, June 8, 1932, February 8, 1933	365Z (32,760), 435G (5010), 451J (21,030)	The 1 krone paid combination rates and high airmail surcharges to Asia, South America and Africa

=== Design and production ===
The Plow and Airplane design was created by Danish artist Axel P. Jensen and the stamps were printed by typography by H. H. Thiele in panes of 30 stamps arranged in five rows of six. During the design and printing process, essays, proofs and color proofs of the stamps were made to finalize the design.

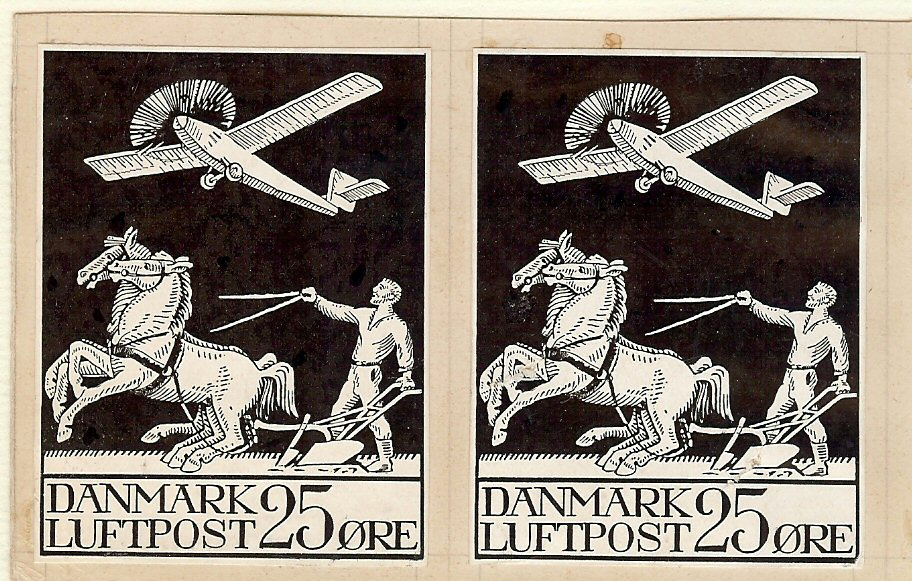
Two positions from the 25 øre original layout sheet in black from which a photographic reduction was made to produce the typograph plates.

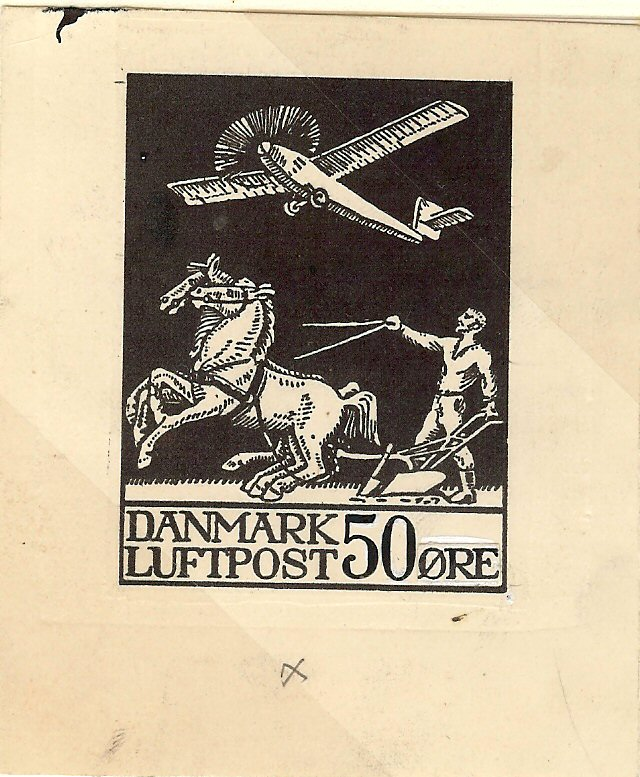
A black essay of 50 øre for the final design on cardstock.

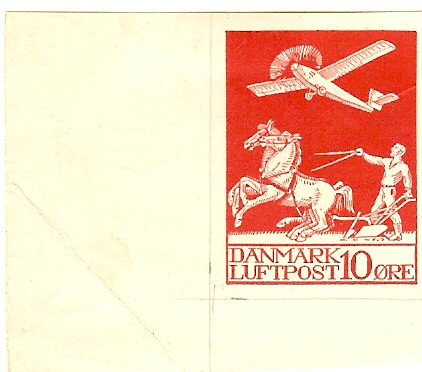
A red unperforated trial colour proof of the 10 øre value.

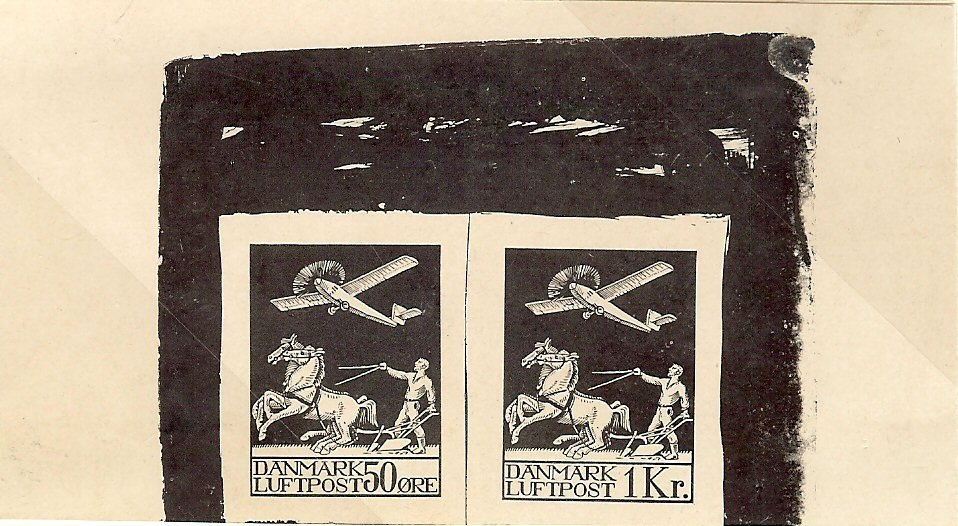
A black composite proof of the 50 øre and 1 krone values on cardstock.

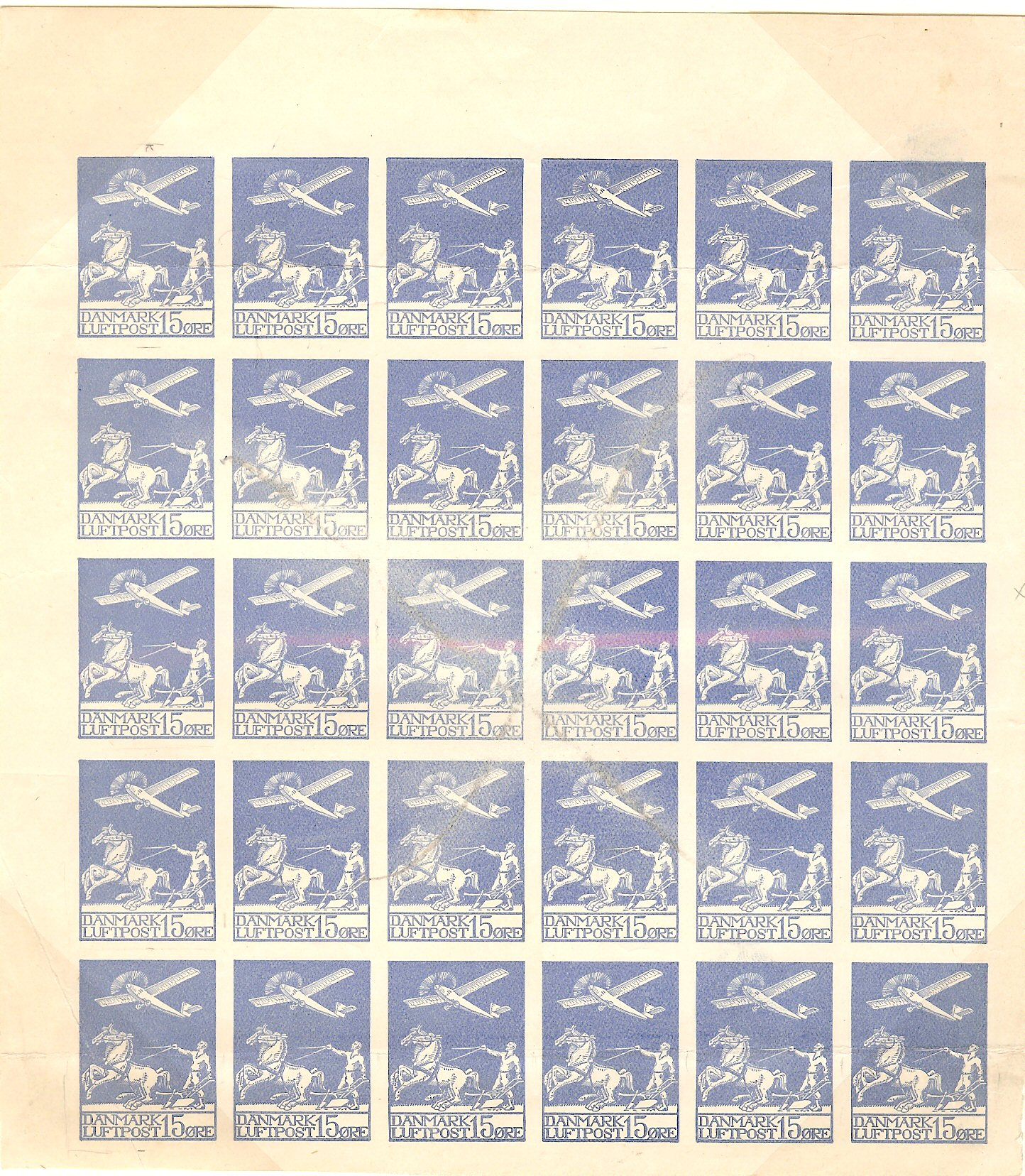
A full sheet light blue trial colour proof for the 15 øre value.

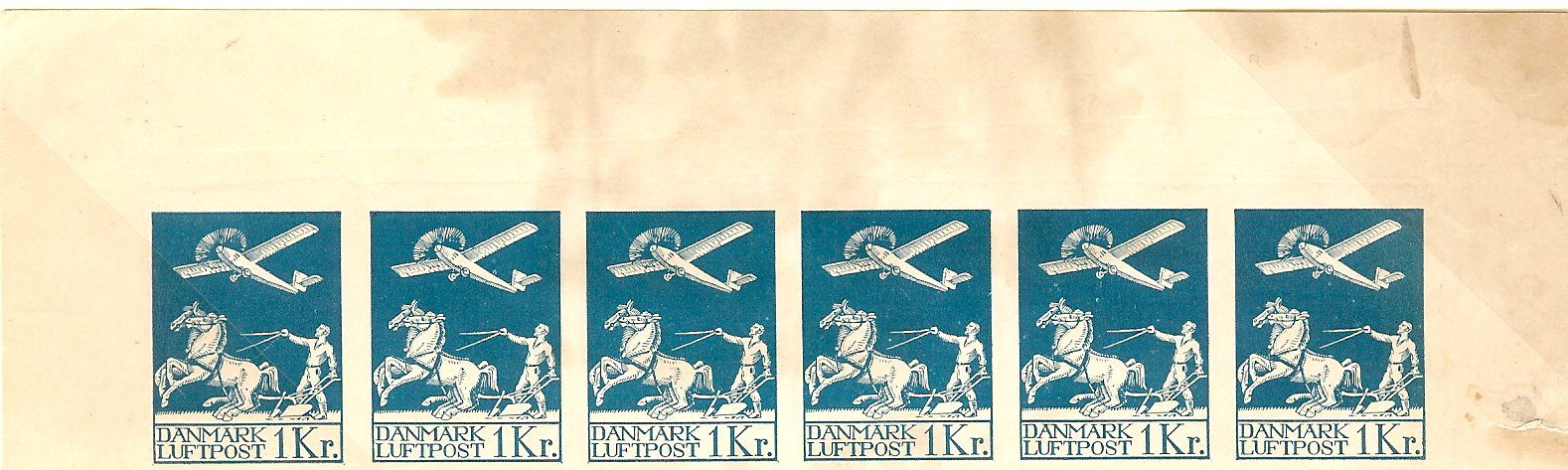
A dark blue trial colour proof for the 1 krone value.

=== Constant Plate Flaws ===
The 1925 series is known for several constant plate flaws that appear on the same stamp in each sheet consistently. These plate flaws have descriptive names.

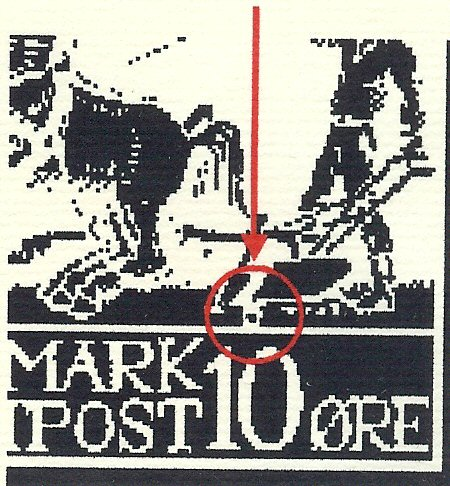
10 øre Stone Under Plow, position 13

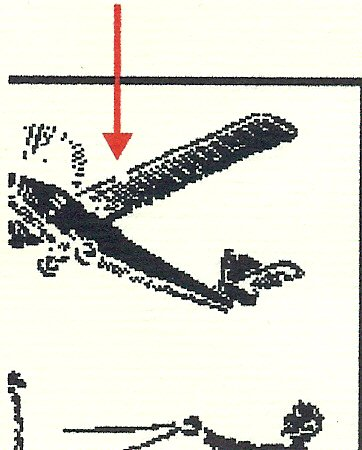
10 øre Broken Right Wing, position 23

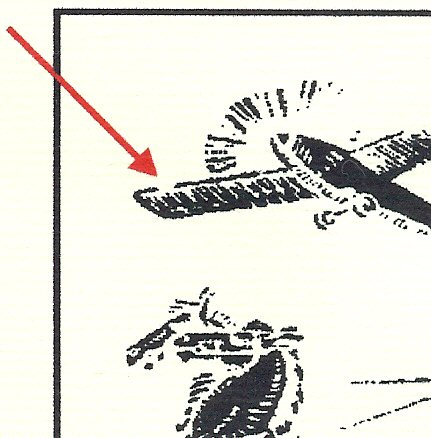
15 øre Broken Left Wing, position 5

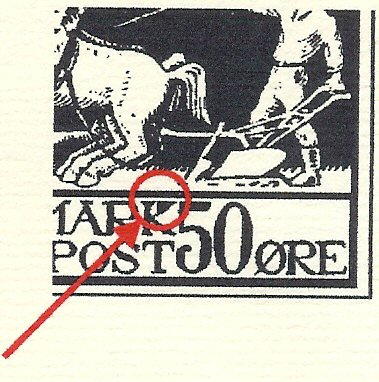
50 øre Blob on K, position 5

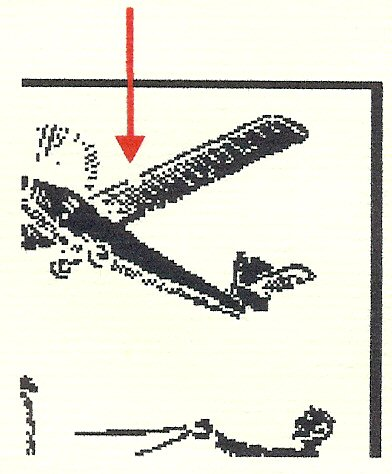
1 krone Broken Right Wing, position 2

=== Usages ===
Image	Description
	Earliest known use of the 1925 series on a June 18, 1925, charity receipt.
	1925 use to Hungary. This 1925 registered letter travelled via truck from Svebolle to Copenhagen, then by airplane to Berlin (DDL), to Vienna (Sachissche Luftverker AG) and Budapest (Magyar Legiforgalmi R. T.). The 65 øre franking pays the 10 øre foreign printed matter rate, the 30 øre registry fee and the 25 øre European printed matter airmail surcharge.
	1928 use to Sweden. This envelope was mailed in Fredericia and travelled via ship to Copenhagen, then via KLM flight #4 to Malmö. From Malmö it went by train to Stockholm, was undeliverable and then forwarded to Gothenburg where it was also undeliverable. Four days later it travelled via ship back to Fredericia. The 60 gram letter was franked with 75 øre to pay the 20-125 gram Nordic letter rate of 30 øre and three times the 15 øre/20 grams Nordic airmail surcharge.
	1929 use to Australia. This envelope travelled via Deutsche Luft Hansa flights #8/12a to Basel, then via train to Brindisi, then via Imperial Airways flight #3 to Basra. From Barsa the letter went via ship to Australia. The 60 øre franking paid the 1927 foreign letter rate (25 øre) and the 1927 airmail surcharge (35 øre) to Iraq.
	1930 use to England. This registered letter travelled from Copenhagen to Stockholm and back to Copenhagen as undeliverable via A. B. Aerotransport. It was then forwarded to London via Amsterdam on KLM flights #1/4. The 55 øre franking was 5 øre short because the letter required the European rates instead of Nordic rates. Note the Great Britain postage due markings and franking.
	1930 use to Latvia. This letter flew from Aarhus to Copenhagen via DDL, then to Berlin, Danzig, Königsberg to Liepāja via German-Russian Derluft flight #3B. The 65 øre franking pays the 30 øre 1927 foreign letter rate, the 1926 25 øre registry fee and the 1928 European airmail surcharge of 15 øre.
	1932 use to South Africa. This letter was from the first known through Danish airmail to Cape Town. The letter travelled via Luft Hansa flights #1/8 from Copenhagen to Amsterdam via Hamburg, then on KLM flight #4 to Paris. From Paris the letter travelled via train to Brindisi, then via Imperial Airways flight #3 to Alexandria. From Alexandria the letter went by train to Cairo and then by Imperial Airways flight #5 to Cape Town. The trip took 25 days.
	1934 use to Argentina. This registered letter travelled from Copenhagen via Luthansa flight #5 to Warnemünde instead of Berlin because of a weather interruption. It then went by train to Berlin and then on Air France flight#6 to Cologne where it encountered another weather interruption. From Cologne it went to Paris via train. From Paris it flew by Air France flights #477/492 to Dakar where it was placed on a ship to Natal. From Natal it flew to Buenos Aires.

== 1934 Airplane over Copenhagen series ==
The 1934 series was issued in denominations of 10, 15, 20, 50 øre and 1 krone. The issue was designed by Poul E. Johansen and engraved by Jons Britze.

Summary of 1934 Airplane over Copenhagen Series
Denomination	Issue dates	Quantities printed	Primary purpose
10 øre	June 9, 1934	580,850	The 10 øre paid the internal and Nordic airmail postcard surcharge (1934)
15 øre	June 9, 1934	461,150	The 15 øre paid the internal and Nordic airmail letter surcharge (1934) and the European airmail postcard surcharge (1934)
20 øre	June 9, 1934	450,450	The 20 øre paid the European airmail letter and printed matter surcharges (1934)
50 øre	June 9, 1934	467,350	The 50 øre paid combination rates and basic airmail surcharges to the Americas, Africa and Asia
1 krone	June 9, 1934	336,800	The 1 krone paid combination rates and multiple airmail surcharges to the Americas, Africa and Asia

=== Usages ===
Image	Description
	1935 use to French Indochina. This letter, mailed in Copenhagen, flew via KLM flights #3/4 to Paris. From Paris it flew via Air France flights #O/M via Marseille, Athens, Beirut to Saigon. The 190 øre franking paid the 1934 foreign letter rate of 30 øre and the 1934 airmail surcharge to Indochina of 160 øre.
	The 15 øre airmail letter shows 1938 internal use and was flown from Aalborg to Copenhagen via DDL and then carried by train to Haderslev.
	1938 use to Aruba. This registered letter travelled via train from Nyborg to Copenhagen and then on DDL flight #1 to Hamburg. From Hamburg it travelled by ship to New York, then by North American Aviation and Pan American flights via Miami and Curaçao to Aruba. The 292 øre franking overpaid by 7 øre. The 1934 foreign letter rate was 30 øre, the 1933 registry fee was 25 øre and the 1935 Netherlands Antilles airmail surcharge was 230 øre.
	1938 use to China. This letter flew from Copenhagen to Berlin on Deutsche Lufthansa flight #7, then to Athens via Lufthansa flight #PF229. From Athens, Air France flight #486 took the letter to Hong Kong via Beirut and Saigon. From Hong Kong it travelled by train through Amoy to Kulangsu. The 95 øre franking paid the 1934 foreign letter rate of 30 øre and the 1939 Hong Kong airmail surcharge of 65 øre.
	1941 use of the 1 krone value on a parcel card mailed from the Faroe Islands during the World War II period of British occupation.

== See also ==
- Postage stamps and postal history of Denmark
