= Eugene N. Costales =

- Born: August 19, 1894
- Died: November 2, 1984 (aged 90); Orange, California
- Spouse: Viola Costales
- Children: One daughter
- Engineering career
- Institutions: Collectors Club of New York; American Philatelic Society; American Stamp Dealers Association
- Practice name: Stamp dealer and auctioneer recognized stamp expert editor for the Scott catalog
- Awards: APS Hall of Fame; Neinken medal Luff Award

Eugene N. Costales (August 19, 1894 – November 2, 1984), of New York City, was a noted stamp dealer, auctioneer, and expert on authenticity of rare stamps and antiquities.

== Philatelic activity ==
Costales started out in the stamp business in 1909. He joined the Scott Stamp and Coin Company which publishes what stamp collectors call the Scott catalog, and from 1916 to 1926 he served as assistant editor, along with John Nicholas Luff, and then served as editor of Scott’s catalogs. He later returned to Scott’s company and served as advisor and pricer from 1955 to 1971.

In 1932 Costales established his own stamp dealership and started conducting stamp auctions in 1942. He conducted a total of sixty one auctions. Among the auction items he sold were philatelic material from famous collections, such as those of Col. Edward Howland Robinson Green, Henry B. Close, E. F. Gore, and Alfred F. Lichtenstein.

Costales was associated with a number of stamp societies. He was a member of the Collectors Club of New York. At the American Philatelic Association he served as an expert on the authenticity of rare stamps and postal history items. He was also an active member of the American Stamp Dealers Association (ASDA).

== Honors and awards ==
Eugene Costales was presented with the Luff Award by the American Philatelic Society in 1976, the Neinken medal in 1982 by the Philatelic Foundation, and in 1983 he was awarded the Dr. Carroll Chase Cup by the U.S. Philatelic Classics Society. He was named to the American Philatelic Society Hall of Fame in 1985.

== Legacy ==
Costales donated a portion of his philatelic library to the Smithsonian Institution in Washington, D.C.

== See also ==
- Philately
