= Hugh C. Barr =

American stamp dealer and auctioneer

- Born: 1878
- Died: June 9, 1960 (aged 81–82)
- Engineering career
- Institutions: American Stamp Dealers Association
- Projects: Stamp dealer and auctioneer who sold famous stamp collections
- Awards: APS Hall of Fame

Hugh C. Barr (1878–1960), of New York City, was a stamp dealer and auctioneer who started out in the stamp business in 1900. Barr had also served as the editor of Spanish Vogue and Dun's International Review.

== Selling stamps ==
Barr was a respected dealer and started selling stamps by auction in 1931, continuing selling by auction for the next twenty five years. Barr was responsible for selling parts of famous collections: the Match and Medicine collection of Clarence Eagle and the personal collection of fellow stamp dealer and auctioneer Percy Gray Doane.

== Philatelic activity ==
Barr was active within the American Stamp Dealers Association and supported its participation in TIPEX in 1926 and 1936 and CIPEX in 1947. After selling his stamp business in 1956, he continued on as an advisor and expert.

== Honors and awards ==
Hugh C. Barr was named to the American Philatelic Society Hall of Fame in 1963.

== See also ==
- Philately
- Philatelic literature
