= Robert A. Siegel =

American stamp auctioneer (1913–1993)

- Born: January 1, 1913
- Died: December 3, 1993 (aged 80)
- Engineering career
- Institutions: American Stamp Dealers Association
- Projects: Head of one of the largest philatelic auction houses in the world; sold the British Guiana 1c magenta on two occasions
- Awards: Neinken Medal; APS Hall of Fame

Robert A. Siegel (January 1, 1913 – December 3, 1993), of New York City, was an auctioneer of philatelic material, particularly rare postage stamps and covers. The company he founded still exists and still bears his name.

== Philatelic auctions ==
Siegel held his first philatelic auction in Kansas City, Missouri. In 1934 he moved his philatelic auction business to New York City and eventually conducted 756 philatelic auctions during his lifetime. In 1964 he conducted his first Rarity Sale.

Siegel's subsequent auctions included world-famous classic postage stamps. In 1970 and 1980, he sold the unique British Guiana 1c magenta, for record prices.

== Philatelic activity ==
Siegel remained active in the American Stamp Dealers Association and served on its board for twelve years. As an expert on rarities, Siegel supported the Philatelic Foundation with his advice and support.

== Honors and awards ==
Siegel received the Mortimer Neinken Medal in 1987 and was named Man of the Year by the American Stamp Dealers Association in 1990. He was named to the American Philatelic Society Hall of Fame in 1994.

== See also ==
- Philatelic literature
