= S. Kellogg Stryker =

- Born: February 5, 1902
- Died: July 20, 1989 (aged 87)
- Engineering career
- Institutions: Philatelic Foundation
- Projects: Expert on United States postage stamps; second curator of the Philatelic Foundation
- Awards: Neinken Medal; APS Hall of Fame

S. Kellogg Stryker (February 5, 1902 – July 20, 1989), of New York City, was a stamp dealer recognized in the philatelic community as an expert on 19th century and 20th century postage stamps.

== Selling stamps ==
Stryker started out in the stamp business in 1928. In 1942 he and Robert Laurence formed Laurence and Stryker, a philatelic auction house which sold rare postage stamps and postal covers from 1942 to 1960.

== Philatelic “finds” ==
Stryker is noted for a number of rare philatelic “finds” of United States stamps, such as discovering the first unused copy of the 1923 one-cent Franklin (Scott 594), and the 1923 one-cent Franklin (Scott 596), both recovered from printer's waste. Stryker also discovered a USIR watermark on the dollar value of the 1938 Presidential series of definitives (Scott 832B); he continued to search for more, and eventually found approximately four hundred more copies.

== Philatelic activity ==
Because of his expertise, he was named the second curator of the Philatelic Foundation, serving from 1962 to 1976, then continuing on as Curator Emeritus for the remainder of his life.

== Honors and awards ==
The Philatelic Foundation awarded Stryker the Mortimer Neinken Medal in 1989. Stryker was named to the American Philatelic Society Hall of Fame in 1990.

== See also ==
- Philately
