= American Philatelic Society Hall of Fame =

Coordinates: 40.909507°N 77.783723°W

The American Philatelic Society Hall of Fame award honors deceased philatelists who have contributed significantly to the field of national and/or international philately.

== History ==
The APS Hall of Fame award was founded at the 1940 American Philatelic Society Convention. The award is intended to honor those deceased philatelists who have made significant contributions during their lifetime to the field of philately.

The award is not to be confused with the society's Luff Award which is presented to outstanding philatelists who are alive at the time of award.

== Requirements ==
Requirements for the APS Hall of Fame are:

- only deceased collectors may be considered for nomination
- those nominated must have made "outstanding contributions to the advancement of national or international philately."

== Recipients ==
Philatelists who have received the APS Hall of Fame award are listed below. Some years have no nominees selected.

- 1941
- John Nicholas Luff
- Sir Rowland Hill, K.C.B.
- Ralph Andrews Barry
- Beverly Sedgwick King
- John Walter Scott
- Thomas Keay Tapling
- John Kerr Tiffany
- James Ludovic Lindsay
- Philip Mathias Wolsieffer
- Charles Esterly Severn
- Frederick John Melville
- Charles Lathrop Pack
- Charles James Phillips
- Edward Spring Knapp
- Hugh McLellan Southgate
- 1942
- W. Hamilton Barnum
- Walter J. Conrath
- Eveleen Mary Weldon Severn
- 1944
- Eugene Klein
- 1945
- Charles Foster Richards
- President Franklin Delano Roosevelt
- Willard Otis Wylie
- 1946
- Percy Gray Doane
- Julius (John) Murray Bartels
- 1947
- William Carlos Stone
- 1948
- Alfred F. Lichtenstein
- 1949
- Edward Haven Mason
- Major James Starr
- 1950
- Saul Newbury
- Rear Admiral Frederic R. Harris
- Walter Stone Scott
- 1951
- Nicolas Sanabria
- James Benjamin Seymour
- Rev. William Hogarth Tower
- 1952
- Donald W. Martin
- Walter R. McCoy
- 1953
- Erik F. Hurt
- Judge David D. Caldwell
- 1954
- Theresa Maria Clark
- Dr. James C. Goodwin
- Al Van Dahl
- 1955
- Jeremiah Hess Barr
- Dr. Daniel Deronda Berolzheimer
- 1956
- Dr. Clarence Wilson Brazer
- Dr. Holland Archer Davis
- Dr. Clarence William Hennan
- 1957
- Hugh Massey Clark
- Col. Max G. Johl
- John W. Stowell, Sr.
- 1958
- Sidney F. Barrett
- Theodore E. Steinway
- 1959
- Stanley Bryan Ashbrook
- Stephen Gottheil Rich
- 1960
- Dr. Carroll Chase
- Adolph Steeg
- 1961
- Rollin E. Flower
- Morris Fortgang
- Harry Myron Konwiser
- 1962
- F. Van Dyk MacBride
- George Benedict Sloane
- 1963
- Louis Henry Barkhausen
- Hugh C. Barr
- Hiram Edmund Deats
- 1964
- Henry Chaloner
- August A. Dietz, Sr.
- Howard H. Elliott
- 1966
- Carl Einar Pelander
- Philip Henry Ward Jr.
- 1967
- William Woodbury Hicks
- George Ward Linn
- Harry Weiss
- 1968
- Louise Boyd Dale
- Vincent Domanski Jr.
- Francis Cardinal Spellman
- 1969
- Charles S. Hamilton
- Henry Albert Meyer
- Dr. Gregory B. Salisbury
- 1971
- Richard McPherren Cabeen
- Lloyd B. Gatchell
- Judge Donald Fisher Lybarger
- 1972
- Lester George Brookman
- Sir Edward Denny Bacon, K.C.V.O.
- Charles Haviland Mekeel
- 1973
- Edith Margaret Faulstich
- Peter G. Keller
- Elliott Perry

- 1974
- Winthrop Smillie Boggs
- Solomon Glass
- Edwin Müller (Mueller)
- 1975
- Henry M. Goodkind
- Delf Norona
- 1976
- Dr. Manuel Ma. Risueño
- Sir John Mitchell Harvey Wilson, Bart., K.C.V.O.
- 1977
- Alfred H. Caspary
- James Mensinger Chemi
- 1978
- Alberto Diena
- Irwin M. Heiman
- Julius Caesar Morgenthau
- 1979
- Henry Ellis Harris
- Harry L. Lindquist
- Dr. Lowell Joseph Ragatz
- 1980
- James Richard William Purves
- George Townsend Turner
- Daniel W. Vooys
- 1981
- William Ewart Gerrish
- Dr. James J. Matejka Jr.
- Ethel Bergstresser (Stewart) McCoy
- 1982
- Charles P. de Volpi
- Léon Dubus
- Svend Yort
- 1983
- Warren Howard Colson
- Dr. Mohamed Dadkhah
- David Louis Lidman
- 1984
- George E. Hargest
- Baron Takaharu Mitsui
- Andrew Earl Weatherly
- 1985
- Eugene N. Costales
- Mortimer L. Neinken
- Dr. Joseph Schatzkés
- 1986
- Robert P. Alexander
- Lucien Berthelot
- Richard H. Thompson
- 1987
- Dr. Soichi Ichida
- Harrison Donald Seaman Haverbeck
- Ernest Anthony Kehr
- 1988
- James H. Beal
- Herbert J. Bloch
- William Reynolds Ricketts
- 1989
- Vincent Graves Greene
- Dr. Cyril Franklin dos Passos
- William Herbert Miller, Jr.
- Prescott Holden Thorp
- 1990
- Robert B. Brandeberry
- Ellery Denison
- Catherine Lemmon Manning
- S. Kellogg Stryker
- 1991
- Everett C. Erle
- Charles L. Towle
- Lynne S. Warm-Griffiths
- 1992
- Dr. P. Felix Ganz
- Clifford Washington Kissinger
- Leon Vincent Rapkin
- Roger G. Weill
- 1993
- Ezra Danolds Cole
- Susan Marshall McDonald
- Bertram William Henry Poole
- 1994
- Creighton C. Hart
- Clifton Armstrong Howes
- Dr. Leonard Kapiloff
- Robert A. Siegel
- 1995
- Joseph Britton Leavy
- George Maybee Martin
- Charles J. Starnes
- 1996
- James H. Baxter
- Charles C. Cratsenberg
- Dr. Gordon H. Torrey
- 1997
- Joseph M. Clary
- Jacques Minkus
- Edward Boker Sterling
- 1998
- Leo August
- Calvin Waters Christian
- Robson Lowe
- 1999
- Dorothy B. Blaney
- Charles Henry Coster
- Dr. Robert Laurenson Dashiell Davidson
- John E. Foxworth, Jr.
- 2000
- Hon. Ernest R. Ackerman
- Herman "Pat" Herst Jr.
- Leon Norman Williams
- 2001
- Dr. Enzo Diena
- C. Belmont Faries
- Dr. Jacques Amable Legrand
- Walton Eugene Tinsley

- 2002
- Victor E. Engstrom
- Edward Loines Pemberton
- Philip Silver
- 2003
- Benjamin Hans Lagerloef
- Franceska Rapkin
- Robert Granville Stone
- Varro Eugene Tyler
- 2004
- John Robert Boker Jr.
- Horace White Harrison
- Colonel Ralph Archibald Kimble
- Raymond Henry Weill
- 2005
- Dr. Herbert Munk
- Franklin Richard Bruns Jr.
- Lauson H. Stone
- Nils Vilhelm Strandell
- 2006
- George Wendell Brett
- Ernst Max Cohn
- Emilio Diena
- Calvet Menger Hahn
- 2007
- Paul Hilmar Jenson
- Clyde Jennings
- Mary Ann Aspinwall Owens
- 2008
- William Penn Brown
- W. Wilson Hulme II
- Morton Dean Joyce
- 2009
- Diane Tumble Boehret
- Col. James T. DeVoss
- Mayette Brown Lane
- 2010
- Charles John Peterson
- Hubert Clayton Skinner
- 2011
- William H. Bauer
- Dr. Karl Heinz Schimmer
- William Lee Welch Jr.
- 2012
- Charless Hahn
- Louis K. Robbins
- Frederick Burton "Bud" Sellers
- 2013
- Bernard Bertram Durkin Harmer
- Roger Glenn Schnell
- Herman Toaspern
- 2014
- Earl Panero Lopez Apfelbaum
- Richard B. Graham
- David Lee Straight
- 2015
- William Wallace Cleland
- Bernard A. Hennig
- Max Kronstein
- 2016
- Richard W. Helbock
- Maynard Sundman
- Lester E. Winick
- 2017
- Robert Markovits
- Barbara Mueller
- Irwin Weinberg
- 2018
- Charles A. Fricke
- Jacques C. Schiff
- William R. Weiss
- 2019
- Thomas J. Alexander
- Jerome Husak
- Michael Mellone
- 2020
- Sophie Buser
- George Griffenhagen
- Ann Triggle
- 2021
- Elizabeth Pope
- Dr. Elizabeth Nettles
- Dr. Esper Hayes
- 2022
- Gordon Morison
- Stanley Piller
- Dr. Guy Dillaway
- 2023
- Alfred F. Kugel
- Reginald Stafford Healy (Captain Tim Healy)
- Dr. Stanley Bierman
- 2024
- Dr. Kenneth B. Grant
- Janet R. Klug
- Dr. Herbert Trenchard
- Anthony S. Wawrukiewicz
- 2025
- Randy Laning Neil
- Michael D. Dixon
- Harlan Fiske Stone II
- William Stewart Dunn
