= Weil (surname) =

Weil, Weill, and Weyl are related German and German-Jewish surnames.

Notable bearers of the surnames include:

== Weil ==
- Adolf Weil (physician) (or Adolph Weill) (1848–1916), German physician
- Adolf Weil (motorcyclist) (1938–2011), German motocross racer
- A. Leo Weil (1858–1938), American lawyer
- André Weil (1906–1998), French mathematician; brother of Simone
- Andrew Weil (born 1942), American physician
- Barbara Weil (1933–2018), American artist
- Baruch Schleisinger Weil (1802–1893), French-American farmer, real estate broker and politician
- Connor Weil (born 1993), American actor
- Cynthia Weil (1940–2023), American songwriter
- Edward Weil (1872–1932), American lawyer and politician
- Elizabeth Weil, American journalist and nonfiction writer
- Éric Weil (1904–1977), French-German philosopher
- Felix Weil (1898–1975), wealthy Argentinean who funded the Institute for Social Research (the "Frankfurt School")
- Gert Weil (born 1960), Chilean shot putter
- Gertrude Weil (1879-1971), American social activist
- Gustav Weil (1808–1889), German Orientalist
- Guy Weill (1914–2006), Swiss-born American art collector
- Hanna Weil (1921–2011), German-born British artist
- Henri Weil (1818–1909), German-born French philologist
- Hermann Wilhelm Weil (1876–1949), American opera singer
- Irwin Weil (born 1928), American professor of Russian literature, son of Sidney Weil
- Jacob Weil (died before 1456), German rabbi and Talmudist
- Jacob Weil (writer) (1792–1864), German educator and writer
- Jiří Weil (1900–1959), Czech novelist
- Jo Weil (born 1977), German actor
- Joe Weil (born 1958), American poet
- Joseph Weil (1875–1976), American confidence man
- Joseph A. Weil (1871–1952), American politician
- Kathleen Weil (born 1954), Quebec politician
- Léon Weil (1896–2006), French World War I veteran
- Liza Weil (born 1977), American actress
- Mark Weil (1952–2007), Soviet and Uzbek theatre director
- Martina Weil (born 1999), Chilean runner
- Nathaniel Weil (1687–1769), German rabbi and Talmudist
- Prosper Weil (1926–2018), French jurist
- Olga Strashun Weil (1903–1963), American amateur tennis player and golfer
- Rachel Judith Weil (born ca 1959), American historian
- Raoul Weil (born 1959), Swiss bank executive
- Robert Schoenhof Weil (1919–2016), American businessman and philanthropist
- Sage Weil (born 1978), American computer scientist
- Shraga Weil (1918–2009), Czech-Israeli artist
- Sidney Weil (1891–1966), American business executive and onetime owner of the Cincinnati Reds
- Simone Weil (1909–1943), French philosopher; sister of André
- Simone Weil (1927–2017), French Holocaust survivor, politician, and advocate for women's rights
- Stephan Weil (born 1958), German politician
- Terence Weil (1921–1995), British cellist
- Wendy Weinberg Weil (born 1958, née Weinberg), American Olympic medalist swimmer
- Wendy Weil Rush (née Weil), great-granddaughter of the Titanic's Strauses of Macy's and wife of Stockton Rush of OceanGate Titan

== Weill ==
- Al Weill (1893–1969), French-American boxing manager
- Alain Weill (born 1961), French business executive
- Alain Weill (art critic) (born 1946), French art critic, expert in graphic design and advertising
- Claudia Weill, American film director
- Claudie Weill (1945–2018), French historian
- Étienne Weill-Raynal (1887–1982), French politician
- Gus Weill (1933–2018), American political consultant and author
- Kurt Weill (1900–1950), German-American composer
- Michel David-Weill (1932–2022), American investment banker; son of Pierre
- Michel Weill (1914–2001), French architect
- Peter Weill (born ca 1955), Australian computer scientist
- Pierre David-Weill (1900–1975), French investment banker; father of Michel
- Raymond Henry Weill (1913–2003), American philatelist; brother of Roger
- Roger G. Weill (1909–1991), American philatelist; brother of Raymond
- Sanford I. Weill (born 1933), American financier

== Weyl ==
- Carl Jules Weyl (1890-1948), German architect and art director
- Glen Weyl (born 1985), American economist and researcher
- Helene Weyl (1893-1948), German writer and translator
- Hermann Weyl (1885-1955), German mathematician
- Nathaniel Weyl (1910–2005), American economist and author
- Richard Weyl (1912-1988), German geologist
- Walter Weyl (1873-1919), American journalist

== See also ==
- Wiel, given name and surname
