= Sidney F. Barrett =

American stamp dealer (1892–1958)

- Born: 1892
- Died: June 18, 1958
- Organizations: American Stamp Dealers Association; Collectors Club of New York
- Known for: Stamp dealer in New York City; was president of the American Stamp Dealers Association
- Awards: APS Hall of Fame

Sidney F. Barrett (1892–1958) of New York City, was a prominent stamp dealer who participated in various important philatelic ventures in New York City itself.

== Philatelic literature ==
Because of his philatelic knowledge, he edited Scott's Specialized Catalogue of United States Stamps for a number of years.

== Philatelic activity ==
Barrett served philately in a number of ways: as president of the American Stamp Dealers Association, director of the Association for Stamp Exhibitions, secretary-treasurer of the 1913 International Philatelic Exhibition, and as a member of the Board of Governors of the Collectors Club of New York.

== Honors and awards ==
Barrett was named to the American Philatelic Society Hall of Fame in 1958.

== See also ==
- Philatelic literature
