= William Herbert Miller Jr. =

William Hubert Miller Jr.
- Born: September 1932
- Died: November 4, 1988 (aged 56)
- Engineering career
- Institutions: American Air Mail Society; Collectors Club of New York; Philatelic Foundation
- Projects: Collected, studied and wrote articles on aerophilately, especially Zeppelin flights and Pigeon Posts.
- Awards: Lichtenstein Medal; APS Hall of Fame; Neinken Medal

William Hubert Miller Jr. (September 1932 – November 4, 1988), of New York City, was an aerophilatelist who published philatelic literature on the subject.

== Philatelic literature ==
Miller specialized in the collection and study of air mail stamps, but especially postage stamps and postal history related to Zeppelin flights and pigeon posts. As a result of his studies, Miller wrote articles in the philatelic press on various aspects of aerophilately.

== Philatelic activity ==
Miller was vice president of the American Air Mail Society in 1973 and continued on with the society as general counsel and a director until 1985. He served as chairman of the Philatelic Foundation and as president of the Council of Philatelic Organizations for a number of years. In addition he served in a number of positions at the Collectors Club of New York.

== Honors and awards ==
Miller was awarded the Neinken Medal in 1985 and the Lichtenstein Medal in 1985. He was elected to the American Philatelic Society Hall of Fame in 1989.

== Legacy ==
According to the Scott Postage Stamp Catalog, air mail postage stamps were issued by postal authorities during the first half of the 20th century and discontinued during the decades after World War II. Miller’s philatelic literature helps illustrate this period of aerophilately within the field of philately.

== See also ==
- Philately
- Philatelic literature
