= W. Wilson Hulme II =

American philatelist (1946–2007)

Woodrow Wilson Hulme II
- Born: June 14, 1946; Dallas, Texas, US
- Died: January 10, 2007 (aged 60); Fort Lauderdale, Florida, US
- Education: U.S. Naval Academy, Michigan State University, Harvard Business School
- Engineering career
- Institutions: Smithsonian Institution; U.S. Philatelic Classics Society; Royal Philatelic Society London; American Philatelic Society; Philatelic Foundation
- Projects: Curator of the National Postal Museum in Washington, D.C.
- Awards: Neinken Award; APS Hall of Fame; Carroll Chase Cup

Woodrow Wilson Hulme II (June 14, 1946 – January 10, 2007) was a philatelist noted for his work in advancing the appreciation of stamp collecting, especially by his work at the National Postal Museum in Washington, D.C.

== Collecting interests ==
Hulme collected postage stamps and postal history of the United States and was considered an expert on the subject.

== Curator ==
Hulme served as Curator of the National Postal Museum at the Smithsonian Institution in Washington, D.C., where he established a policy of displaying postal themes and fixtures that would not only attract stamp collectors, but also the curious public. Hulme is recognized as displaying a number of significant philatelic exhibits, such as the Benjamin K. Miller Collection of early U.S. stamps which was borrowed from the New York Public Library, and also the U.S. Postmaster General’s Collection, and items from the Queen Elizabeth II’s stamp collection, officially known as the Royal Philatelic Collection.

== Philatelic activity ==
Because of his expertise of United States postal history, Hulme made significant discoveries during his research of early post office records and wrote numerous articles on the subject.

Hulme was active in the U.S. Philatelic Classics Society, where he served as president from 2004 to 2007. He was also a fellow at the Royal Philatelic Society London, and served as an expert at both the American Philatelic Society and the Philatelic Foundation.

== Honors and awards ==
A number of honors were bestowed on Hulme, including the Distinguished Philatelist Award, Carroll Chase Cup, Mortimer Neinken Award, and the Lester G. Brookman Cup. Hulme was named to the American Philatelic Society Hall of Fame in 2008.

== See also ==
- Philatelic literature
