= Raymond Henry Weill =

- Born: September 29, 1913
- Died: April 21, 2003 (aged 89)
- Parent: Fernand Weill (father)
- Engineering career
- Institutions: Crescent City Stamp Club; American Stamp Dealers Association
- Projects: Along with his brother Roger were famous sellers of rare postage stamps; donated copy of "inverted Jenny" to the Smithsonian
- Awards: Luff Award; APS Hall of Fame; Neinken Medal

Raymond Henry Weill (September 29, 1913 – April 21, 2003), of New Orleans, Louisiana, and his brother Roger G. Weill, were famous dealers of rare postage stamps, commonly referred to as the Weill brothers.

== Selling rare stamps ==
The Weill brothers, and their father Fernand, in 1932 opened their philatelic store at 407 Royal Street in the French Quarter of New Orleans. They quickly gained a reputation for selling the rarest of postage stamps but also served and encouraged youngsters who visited their stamp store. Raymond loved to travel and would travel to review and purchase stamp collections throughout the country, while Roger preferred to remain tending the shop. Some of the most important collections known in philately, including those built by the brothers themselves, were sold by the Weill brothers. Some of the famous rare postage stamps sold through the Weill brothers include the famous cover bearing two 1-penny Post Office Mauritius stamps from the collection of Louise Boyd Dale. The cover sold through a Harmer auction in 1968 for the sum of $380,000.00, the highest sum ever recorded for the sale of a philatelic item up until that time.

== Philatelic philanthropy ==
The Weill brothers were regarded in the philatelic world as being honest, reputable, and generous. They supported their local stamp club, the Crescent City Stamp Club, as well as national philatelic organizations. One of the rarest American stamps is the "inverted Curtis Jenny" 24 cent airmail stamp of 1918, listed in the Scott catalog as C3a. The brothers felt that such a rare American stamp should be reserved for all Americans, and they donated a copy of the stamp to the Smithsonian Institution in Washington, D.C.

Raymond donated his library of philatelic literature and papers to the Postal History Foundation in Tucson, Arizona. In 1989 the firm sold its stock for ten million dollars; however, the brothers decided afterwards to continue their work and did so until they both died.

== Honors and awards ==
In 1998 Raymond Weill was awarded the Luff Award for exceptional contributions to philately, and, in 1988, he and his brother Roger were awarded the Neinken medal by the Philatelic Foundation. Weill was named to the American Philatelic Society Hall of Fame in 2004.

== See also ==
- Philately
