= Daniel Deronda Berolzheimer =

American philatelist

- Born: June 30, 1877
- Died: August 24, 1952 (aged 75)
- Engineering career
- Institutions: Philatelic Foundation
- Projects: Created collections of postal stationery; was an expert on chemistry of paper
- Awards: APS Hall of Fame

Daniel Deronda Berolzheimer (June 30, 1877 – August 24, 1952), of New York City, was a philatelist who was named to the Hall of Fame of the American Philatelic Society.

== Collecting interests ==
Berolzheimer had a number of postage stamp collections, but specialized in the collection and study of postal stationery, including postal cards and postal envelopes. Because of Berolzheimer's background as a chemist, he was able to study, and write on, variations of paper, inks, and color characteristics of the stationery.

Along with Victor Berthold and Julius (John) Murray Bartels, he was known as one of the “three B’s” of postal stationery.

== Postal literature ==
Berolzheimer wrote numerous articles on postal stationery and authored a column in Stamps magazine. He was also a consultant on postal stationery to the Scott's Specialized Catalogue of United States Stamps. He also authored the Bartels Postal Card Catalogue and served as advisory editor of the Thorp-Bartels Catalogue.

== Philatelic activity ==
Because of his expertise, Berolzheimer served on the expert committee of the Philatelic Foundation.

== Honors and awards ==
Berolzheimer was named to the American Philatelic Society Hall of Fame in 1955.

== See also ==
- Philately
- Philatelic literature
