= Prescott Holden Thorp =

- Born: April 28, 1897
- Died: June 1981 (aged 84)
- Engineering career
- Projects: Expert on postal stationery; wrote books on the subject.
- Awards: Crawford Medal; APS Hall of Fame

Prescott Holden Thorp (April 28, 1887 – June 1981), of New Jersey, was a stamp dealer who was a recognized world-famous expert on stamped envelopes of the United States.

== Philatelic literature ==
Thorp continued the work of Julius (John) Murray Bartels, editing the fifth edition of Bartels Catalogue of the Stamped Envelopes and Wrappers of the United States and Possessions. In 1954 he completed a sixth edition and named it Thorp-Bartels Catalogue of the Stamped Envelopes and Wrappers of the United States.

Thorp wrote several other books on philately: Catalogue of the 20th Century Stamped Envelopes and Wrappers of the United States, in 1968, and Complete Guide to Stamp Collecting, in 1953. He also edited and published from 1949 to 1970 The U.S. Envelope World.

== Honors and awards ==
For his writings on stamped envelopes, Thorp received the Crawford Medal in 1945. He was named to the American Philatelic Society Hall of Fame in 1989.

== See also ==
- Philately
- Philatelic literature
