= Leonard Kapiloff =

American philatelist

Dr. Leonard Kapiloff
- Born: March 1, 1915
- Died: November 25, 1993 (aged 78)
- Engineering career
- Institutions: Philatelic Foundation
- Projects: Completed famous collections of United States 19th century postage stamps and postal history
- Awards: Neinken medal APS Hall of Fame

Dr. Leonard Kapiloff (March 1, 1915 – November 25, 1993), of Maryland, was a philatelist recognized for his collecting of United States postage stamps issued prior to 1900.

== Collecting interests ==
Dr. Kapiloff was noted for his collecting of 19th century postage stamps and postal history of the United States. He was able, during his lifetime, to create two award-winning collections, United States Postage Issues from 1847 to 1857, which won the gold at ISRAPHIL ’85 and at other exhibitions, and his second significant collection which centered on New York Postmaster Provisionals and the United States and City Despatch Posts.

== Philatelic activity ==
From 1986 to 1988, Dr. Kapiloff was a trustee at the Philatelic Foundation.

== Honors and awards ==
Kapiloff was awarded the Mortimer Neinken medal in 1992 by the Philatelic Foundation for his services to the hobby of philately. In 1994, Kapiloff was named to the American Philatelic Society Hall of Fame.

== See also ==
- Stamp collecting
