= Charles Haviland Mekeel =

American stamp dealer and editor

- Born: December 1, 1861
- Died: October 13, 1921 (aged 59)
- Engineering career
- Projects: Edited numerous stamp journals; founded and edited Mekeel's Weekly Stamp News
- Awards: APS Hall of Fame

Charles Haviland Mekeel (December 1, 1861 – October 13, 1921), of St. Louis, Missouri, was a well-known stamp dealer and editor. He figured prominently in the 1895 “find” of the St. Louis Postmaster Provisionals, which solved problems related to their authenticity.

== Philatelic literature ==
Besides his trade as a stamp dealer, Mekeel edited numerous philatelic journals, including The Stamp Collectors' Bureau (1891); Philatelic Journal of America (1885), which eventually changed its name to Mekeel's Stamp Collector; Mekeel's Drummer (1900 to 1901); Mekeel's News and Trade Journal (1905–1912); and a daily stamp journal which was published for less than a year in 1896, The Daily Stamp News.

Mekeel's Weekly Stamp News is the publication he is most remembered for. He started publishing the weekly in January 1891, and continued editing and publishing it until 1897, when he sold it to his brother Isaac, who continued publishing the journal until the 1940s. (It is now known as Mekeel's & Stamps Magazine, published by John Dunn, and edited by John Leszak )

== Collecting interests ==
Mekeel collected postage stamps of Mexico and wrote The Mexican Postal Stamp Catalog in 1890 and The Postage Stamps of Mexico in 1911. From 1892 to 1895, he published in St. Louis a philatelic journal in Spanish, entitled La Revista Filatelica.

== St. Louis Bears ==
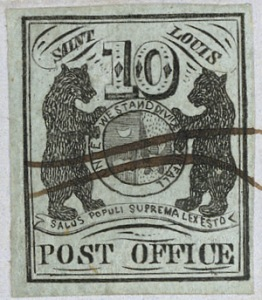
Postmaster Provisional, St. Louis 1845

Mekeel was involved in the study and authentication of the 1895 discovery of St. Louis Postmaster Provisionals, which verified the plating of the provisionals and the authenticity of the 20 cent value. Based on his study of the provisionals, Mekeel wrote The History of the Postage Stamps of the St. Louis Postmaster, 1845-1847 in 1895.

== Honors and awards ==
Mekeel was admitted to the American Philatelic Society Hall of Fame in 1972.

== See also ==
- Philately
- Philatelic literature
