= Gregory B. Salisbury =

Dr. Gregory B. Salisbury
- Born: May 2, 1910
- Died: January 24, 1968 (aged 57)
- Engineering career
- Institutions: Rossica Society of Russian Philately; British Society of Russian Philately
- Practice name: Expert on postage stamps and postal history of Russia
- Awards: APS Hall of Fame

Dr. Gregory B. Salisbury (May 2, 1910 – January 24, 1968) of Philadelphia, Pennsylvania, was a noted philatelist named to the Hall of Fame by the American Philatelic Society.

== Collecting interests ==
Dr. Salisbury specialized in the study of the postage stamps and postal history of Russia and concentrated his studies and collecting on the imperial issues, such as those issued under the Romanovs.

== Philatelic activity ==
Dr. Salisbury was an active member of the Rossica Society of Russian Philately and helped to reorganize the society after World War II. He served the society as its president and editor-in-chief of its journal, the Rossica Journal of Russian Philately. He was also an active member of the British Society of Russian Philately.

== Philatelic literature ==
Because of his expert knowledge of Russian philately, Dr. Salisbury wrote extensively on Russian postal history in the Rossica Journal of Russian Philately as well as the journal of the British Society of Russian Philately.

== Honors and awards ==
Dr. Salisbury was named to the American Philatelic Society Hall of Fame in 1969.

== Legacy ==
The New York City chapter of the Rossica Society of Russian Philately was renamed the Dr. Gregory B. Salisbury Chapter of the society in his honor.

== See also ==
- Postage stamps and postal history of Russia
- Philatelic literature
