= Ray J. Ceresa =

English chemist, stamp collector and philatelic expert

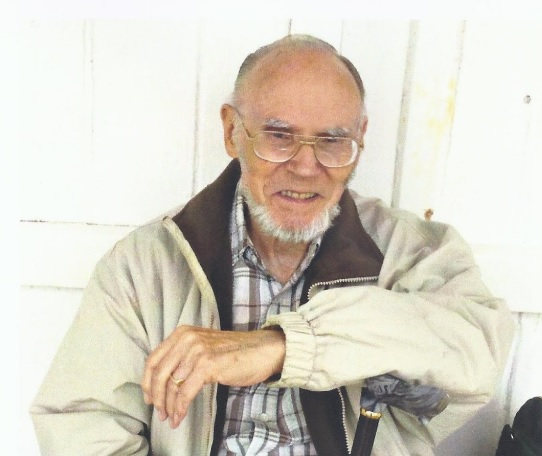
- Born: Raymond John Ceresa; March 25, 1929
- Died: 10 June 2017 (aged 88); West Sussex, England
- Education: PhD Chemistry
- Spouse: June Elizabeth New
- Children: Andrew John Ceresa born 3 September 1954, Dianne Margaret Ceresa born 21 September 1956, and Penelope Helen Ceresa born 17 March 1961.
- Engineering career
- Projects: 5 Volume work on the postage stamps of Russia 1917–23.
- Awards: American Revenue Association exhibition award: twice silver, Chicagopex 2004 silver.

Raymond John Ceresa (25 March 1929 – 10 June 2017) was an English chemist, stamp collector and philatelic expert on postage stamps of Russia and areas from the 1917–23 era. Ceresa wrote a five-volume monumental work on these issues.

== Chemistry ==
Ceresa specialised in block and graft copolymers. He has written several books about the subject:

- Block and Graft Copolymers (1963)
- Block and Graft Copolymerization (1973)
- Block and Graft Copolymerization: v. 2 (1975)

== Collecting interests and memberships ==
The postage stamps of Russia and areas, Russian forgeries, Russian revenues, stamps and documents.

Ceresa was member of the board of directors of the Rossica Society of Russian Philately and was member of BSRP, UPNS, UPV, and socs. in Germany, ANZAC.

== Philatelic literature ==
Ceresa has written a monumental work on the postage stamps of Russia in the 1917–23 era:

- The Postage Stamps of Russia 1917–23 (1983)

=== Volume 1. Armenia ===
Part 1 The 60 Kopeck surcharges
Part 2 The Small and Medium sized Framed HP Monogram Overprints
Part 3 The Large sized Framed HP Monogram Overprints
Parts 4/5 The Unframed HP Monogram Overprints
Parts 6/7 the 1, 3 and 5 Rouble HH Surcharges
Parts 8/9 The 10, 25, 50, and 100 Rouble HH Surcharges
Parts 10/13 The Pictorial Issues and Surcharges

=== Volume 2. Ukraine ===
Parts 1/2 The Trident Issues of Odesa Types I to IV
Parts 3/4 The Trident Issues of Odesa Types V and VI
Parts 5/6 The Trident Issues of Katerinoslav and Poltava
Parts 7/8 The Trident Issues of Kharkiv Types I, II and III
Parts 9/13 The Trident Issues of Kyiv Types I, II and III (TEXT)
Parts 9/13 The Trident Issues of Kyiv Types I, II and III (PLATES)
Parts 14/19 The Trident Issues of Podilia Types Ia to XVIe (TEXT)
Parts 14/19 The Trident Issues of Podilia Types Ia to XVIe (PLATES)
Parts 20/23 The Special Trident Issues (TEXT)
Parts 20/23 The Special Trident Issues (PLATES)
Parts 24/26 The Shahiv, Hryven and Vienna Issues. (TEXT)
Parts 24/26 The Shahiv, Hryven and Vienna Issues. (PLATES)

=== Volume 3. Armies and Post Offices ===
Parts 1/2 North Western and Northern Armies
Parts 3/5 Siberia, Far East and Related Issues
Parts 6/12 South Russia and Russian Refugee Post Issues (TEXT & PLATES "A")
Parts 6/12 South Russia and Russian Refugee Post Issues (PLATES "B")
Parts 13/15 Russian Post Offices in China
Parts 16/18 Russian Post Offices in the Levant and White Armies
Parts 19/21 Addenda to North Western and Northern Armies, Siberia and F.E.R.
Parts 22/24 Addenda to Issues for S. Russia, Crimea, White Armies & P.O.'s etc.

=== Volume 4. Transcaucasia ===
Parts 1/5 Azerbaijan sections A and B
Parts 6/7 Sections C1 and CII
Parts 8/12 Georgia Sections A and B
Parts 13/16 Batum sections A and B

=== Volume 5. The RSFSR ===
Parts 1/5 October 1917 to early March 1920
Parts 6/9 March 1920 to August 1921 Armavir to Kharkiv
Parts 10/12 Mar1920 to Aug 1921 Kharkov to Zkukovka
Parts 13/18 Definitive issues of 1921
Parts 13/18 Provisional and Commemorative issues
Parts 19/25 1922 issues
Parts 19/25 1922 issues continued
Parts 26/29 1923 Star Surcharges
Parts 30/31 1923 Small Heads
Parts 32/40 Late 1923 issues

Supplement:

- Russian Postage Stamps 1917–1923 Pocket Forgery Guide (2004–2005)

Part 1 Russia – North Western Army, Kopeck Values
Part 2 Russia- North Western Army, Ruble Values
Part 3 Armenia – 60 Kopeck Overprints
Part 4A Russia – Ukraine, Odessa Type I
Part 4B Russia – Ukraine, Odessa Type II Tridents
Part 5 Russia – Northern Army
Part 6 Armenia – Small Framed HP Monograms
Part 7A Russia – Ukraine, Odessa Type III Tridents
Part 8 Russia – Western Army Overprints
Part 9 Armenia – Medium Framed HP Monograms
Part 10 Russia – Ukraine Odessa Types V
Part 11 Russia – Ukraine Odessa Types VI
Part 12 South Russia – Don Territory, Kossack Government
Part 13 Russia – Siberia, Far Eastern Republic
Parts 19/20 Russia – Siberia Priamur and Maritime Provinces and Soviet Far East Issues

=== Articles in philatelic journals ===
Ceresa authored many articles in journals of Russian Philatelic Societies.

- Rossica.
- Pochta.
- BJRP – The British Journal of Russian Philately.
- Ямщик – The Post-Rider.

== Honors and awards ==
Dr. Ray Ceresa was awarded many times for his exhibits and literature. An incomplete list:

- STAMPEX 2011, Large Vermeil – Revenue Class: 'The Revenue Stamps Used in Armenia from 1918 to 1930'.
- ROSSICAPEX 2009, Silver medals for two exhibits Armenian Revenues – Their Use on Receipts 1918–1924 and The Trident Revenues of Podolia, Ukraine, 1919 from the American Revenue Association.
- CHICAGOPEX 2007 Palmares, Silver Bronze – category Literature: 'Russian Postage Stamps 1917–1923, Pocket Forgery Guide, Booklets 8 (Russia – Western Army) and 10A (Russia – Ukraine, Odessa Type Va Tridents).
- CHICAGOPEX 2006 Palmares, Vermeil – category Literature: 'Russian Postage Stamps 1917–1923, Pocket Forgery Guide, Booklets 7B and 9'.
- CHICAGOPEX 2004 Palmares, Silver – category Literature: 'Russian Postage Stamps 1917–1923, Pocket Forgery Guide, Booklets 1-4B'.

== See also ==
- Philately
- Philatelic literature
