= Peter G. Keller =

American stamp dealer

- Born: October 13, 1894
- Died: September 15, 1972 (aged 77)
- Organizations: American Stamp Dealers Association
- Known for: Director and executive officer of the American Stamp Dealers Association; founded the Lions International Stamp Club
- Spouse: Helen Van Zilen Keller
- Awards: APS Hall of Fame

Peter G. Keller (October 13, 1894 – September 15, 1972), of New York, was an American stamp dealer who, along with his wife Helen Van Zilen Keller, helped develop the organization of stamp dealers in the United States.

== Organizational efforts ==
Peter Keller served the American Stamp Dealers Association (ASDA) for twenty five years, nearly tripling its membership (from 400 to 1100) during his tenure as director and executive officer. His wife Helen took an active role in the ASDA during this time, and, after Peter retired from the ASDA in 1966, he and Helen continued to support the organization.

Peter also founded the Lions International Stamp Club and was president of the International Federation of Stamp Dealers during 1958 and 1959.

== Philatelic activity ==
Peter and Helen organized the first ASDA national show in 1949, and continued to support subsequent shows.

== Honors and awards ==
Peter G. Keller was named to the American Philatelic Society Hall of Fame in 1973.

== See also ==
- Philately
- Philatelic literature
