= Rapkin =

Rapkin is a surname. Notable people with the surname include:

- David Rapkin, American recording engineer, sound designer, and audio producer
- Franceska Rapkin (1936–2001), British philatelist
- Leon Vincent Rapkin (1929–1991), British philatelist
