= Ezra Danolds Cole =

American philatelist (1902–1992)

- Born: November 19, 1902
- Died: August 8, 1992 (aged 89)
- Engineering career
- Institutions: Collectors Club of New York; Association for Stamp Exhibitions; American Stamp Dealers Association
- Projects: World-famous stamp dealer; helped form some of the greatest collections in philately
- Awards: Luff Award; APS Hall of Fame

Ezra Danolds Cole (November 19, 1902 – August 8, 1992), of Nyack, New York, was well known stamp dealer who was named to the Hall of Fame of the American Philatelic Society.

== Stamp dealer ==
Cole was known as a “world famous” stamp dealer as he helped build some of the most prestigious stamp collections known. He started selling stamps in the 1920s, and, by the 1930s, he had established his own business: Ezra Cole, Nyack, N.Y.

== Philatelic activity ==
Cole was very involved in the organizational aspects of philately. He served as the president of the American Stamp Dealers Association, as a governor at the Collectors Club of New York, and as president of the Association for Stamp Exhibitions.

== Honors and awards ==
In 1970 Cole received the Luff Award for Exceptional Contributions to Philately, and, in 1993, he was named to the American Philatelic Society Hall of Fame.

== See also ==
- Stamp collecting
