= Roger G. Weill =

- Born: June 12, 1909
- Died: March 2, 1991 (aged 81)
- Parent: Fernand Weill (father)
- Engineering career
- Projects: Famous stamp dealer; sold some of the world's greatest philatelic rareties
- Awards: Neinken Medal; APS Hall of Fame

Roger G. Weill (June 12, 1909 – March 2, 1991), of New Orleans, was a stamp dealer who sold some of the world's greatest philatelic rarities.

== Philatelic activity ==
Roger and his brother Raymond and their father Fernand formed the Raymond H. Weill Company in 1932. For the next sixty years, the firm became world famous for being accorded the honor of selling some of the world's most rare and treasured postage stamps.

Weill acquired and sold rare postage stamps and covers of the United States and foreign countries. He drew the attention of the philatelic world in 1968 when he paid the sum of $380,000 for the famous “Mauritius Post Office” cover (envelope with cancelled stamps) which was the highest price ever paid up to that time for a philatelic item of any kind.

== Honors and awards ==
The Philatelic Foundation awarded Weill the Mortimer Neinken Medal in 1988, and, in 1992, Weill was elevated to the American Philatelic Society Hall of Fame.

== See also ==
- Philately
- Philatelic literature
