= P. Felix Ganz =

American philatelist (1922–1990)

Dr. P. Felix Ganz
- Born: January 23, 1922; Basel, Switzerland
- Died: September 5, 1990 (aged 68); Chicago, Illinois, US
- Spouse: Cheryl Ganz
- Engineering career
- Discipline: Music school professor and dean
- Institutions: Roosevelt University; American Helvetia Philatelic Society; Chicago Philatelic Society; United Postal Stationery Society
- Projects: Awarded APS Champion of Champions for exhibit on stamps and postal history of Switzerland; served in various philatelic organizations
- Awards: Newbery Medal; APS Hall of Fame

P. Felix Ganz (January 23, 1922 – September 5, 1990), of Chicago, Illinois, was a student and collector of postage stamps and postal history as well as an officer of several major philatelic organizations.

== Collecting interests ==
Ganz was especially noted for his collections of postal history, postal stationery, and postage stamps of Switzerland, Liechtenstein and Andorra. When he exhibited his “Pre-Confederation Switzerland 1748-1848” at philatelic exhibitions in 1979, it was awarded the APS Champion of Champions classification. Ganz was also interested in other segments of philately, such as philately of U.S. postal stationery, France, Monaco, and Canada.

== Philatelic activity ==
Ganz served as president of a number of philatelic organizations, including the American Helvetia Philatelic Society, the Chicago Philatelic Society, and the United Postal Stationery Society.

== Philatelic literature ==
As well as serving as the editor of the journal Tell, Ganz authored numerous philatelic articles. A collection of his articles in Tell were later printed by the American Helvetia Philatelic Society in book form as Postal Cancellations and Markings in Switzerland. In addition Ganz for many years wrote a column called Brief aus Chicago in the Berner Briefmarken Zeitung. He also co-authored the book Perfins of Switzerland.

Ganz also served on the philatelic exhibition AMERIPEX in 1986 as commissioner coordinator.

== Honors and awards ==
The Chicago Philatelic Society acknowledged Ganz’ philatelic efforts by awarding him the Newbery Medal. He was also elected to the APS Writers Unit Hall of Fame in 1988, and, in 1992, he was named to the American Philatelic Society Hall of Fame.

== See also ==
- Postage stamps and postal history of Switzerland
- Philatelic literature
