= Richard H. Thompson (philatelist) =

American philatelist (1903–1985)

- Born: Richard Henry Thompson; June 28, 1903
- Died: January 5, 1985 (aged 81)
- Resting place: Druid Ridge Cemetery
- Engineering career
- Institutions: American Air Mail Society; Baltimore Philatelic Society; Society of Philatelic Americans
- Projects: Active in supporting air mail first day covers; served the Baltimore Philatelic Society and BALPEX
- Awards: APS Hall of Fame; Luff Award

Richard Henry Thompson (June 28, 1903 – January 5, 1985) was a philatelist from Baltimore, Maryland, who supported stamp collecting at the national level as well as in the Baltimore area.

== Philatelic literature ==
Richard Henry Thompson had a wide range of interests in stamp collecting, but is best known for his specialized interest in airmail covers of the United States. Because of his writings on the subject he was awarded the Philip Henry Ward Jr. Award.

== Philatelic activity ==
Thompson was very active in the philatelic community. He was president of the American First Day Cover Society from 1964 to 1966, and served the Bureau Issues Association (now the United States Stamp Society) as president and chairman of the Board of Governors. He also served the American Air Mail Society as its president in 1973 and 1974, and the Society of Philatelic Americans as a director from 1972 to 1977.

Thompson remained an active member of the Baltimore Philatelic Society from 1929 until he died in 1985. He served the society in various ways, including serving as president at times and as chairman of its annual Baltimore Philatelic Exhibition (BALPEX) stamp show.

== Personal life ==
Thompson married Naomi Elizabeth Pritchett. They had five children, Anne, Richard David, Alice, Roger Lee and Susan. He died on January 5, 1985. He was buried in Druid Ridge Cemetery.

== Honors and awards ==
For his efforts in the field of philately, Thompson received much recognition. He was awarded the Luff Award for Exceptional Contributions to Philately in 1982 and was admitted to the American Philatelic Society Hall of Fame in 1986.

== See also ==
- Philately
- Philatelic literature
