= Calvin Waters Christian =

American philatelist

- Born: September 8, 1905
- Died: January 14, 1997 (aged 91)
- Engineering career
- Institutions: U.S. Philatelic Classics Society
- Projects: An expert in early classic postage stamps of the United States, especially the 1861 series.
- Awards: Luff Award; APS Hall of Fame

Calvin Waters Christian (September 8, 1905 – January 14, 1997), of California, was a philatelist known to his fellow philatelists as “Bert.”

== Collecting interests ==
Bert specialized in the collecting and study of classic United States stamps, but was especially known for his collection and detailed study of the United States 1861 series of postage stamps. He was particularly interested in stamps of that era that were printed and issued with an ink-absorbent grille on their face. His collection of 1861 one cent Franklin stamps was award-winning when displayed at stamp exhibitions.

== Philatelic literature ==
Christian wrote extensively, based on his studies, including a series of articles in The American Philatelist and another series in the Bulletin of the Philatelic Foundation. Much of Christian’s unpublished research was eventually published by Don L. Evans in his book, The United States 1¢ Franklin 1861-1867.

== Philatelic activity ==
“Bert” Christian was active in a number of philatelic societies. At the U.S. Philatelic Classics Society he served as president, vice president, and director. He was also a frequent contributor to the Chronicle of U.S. Classic Postal Issues.

== Honors and awards ==
Christian was presented with both the Chase and Brookman cups by the U.S. Philatelic Classics Society. He was also awarded the Luff Award for Distinguished Philatelic Research in 1993 by the American Philatelic Society. In 1998 he was named to the American Philatelic Society Hall of Fame.

== See also ==
- Philately
- Philatelic literature
