= Gordon H. Torrey =

Dr. Gordon H. Torrey
- Born: December 4, 1919
- Died: March 28, 1995 (aged 75)
- Engineering career
- Institutions: American Philatelic Society; Society of Philatelic Americans; Rossica Society of Russian Philately
- Projects: Collected, and became expert on, postage stamps of Russia, the Middle East and the Ottoman Empire
- Awards: APS Hall of Fame

Dr. Gordon H. Torrey (December 4, 1919 – March 28, 1995), of Maryland, was a stamp collector active within the Washington, D.C., area, and at the national level.

== Career ==
Torrey began his career with the OSS during World War Two, where he specialized in forging German postage stamps. His work was most notably used in the delivery of Allied propaganda as part of Operation Cornflakes. After the war, he served with the CIA from 1956 to 1974 as an analyst specializing in Middle Eastern politics; his work supporting the White House's diplomatic efforts in states such as Egypt and Syria. After leaving the CIA, he continued to lecture on the region at Johns Hopkins University School of Advanced International Studies, and worked for Christie's Auction House as their stamp representative.

== Collecting interests ==
Torrey had a wide understanding of philately, and the postage stamps and postal history that he specialized in: stamps of the Middle East, the Imperial era of Russia, and the Ottoman Empire.

== Philatelic activity ==
Torrey belonged to a number of stamp clubs in the Washington, D.C./Maryland/Northern Virginia area, serving as an officer in a number of them. At the American Philatelic Society (APS) and at the Society of Philatelic Americans, he served on the expert committee. At the Rossica Society of Russian Philately, he was elected to the posts of president pro tem (1972), president (from 1974 to 1992), and membership in the Board of Governors, where he served until his death in 1995.

Torrey participated in philatelic exhibitions. He was a member of the board of the annual NAPEX (National Philatelic Exhibition) during the 1960s and 1970s, and also on the board of directors of CIPEX (Sixth International Philatelic Exhibition), held in Washington, D.C. in 1966.

== Philatelic literature ==
Torrey wrote numerous articles on his love of postage stamps and the history of Imperial Russia, and published them in Rossica, the journal of the Rossica Society of Russian Philately.

== Honors and awards ==
Torrey was named to the American Philatelic Society Hall of Fame in 1996.

== See also ==
- Philately
- Philatelic literature
