= Bertram W. H. Poole =

British-American philatelist (1880–1957)

Bertram William Henry Poole
- Born: March 22, 1880
- Died: September 8, 1957 (aged 77)
- Engineering career
- Projects: Editor of philatelic literature; writer of numerous articles on philatelic subjects.
- Awards: APS Hall of Fame

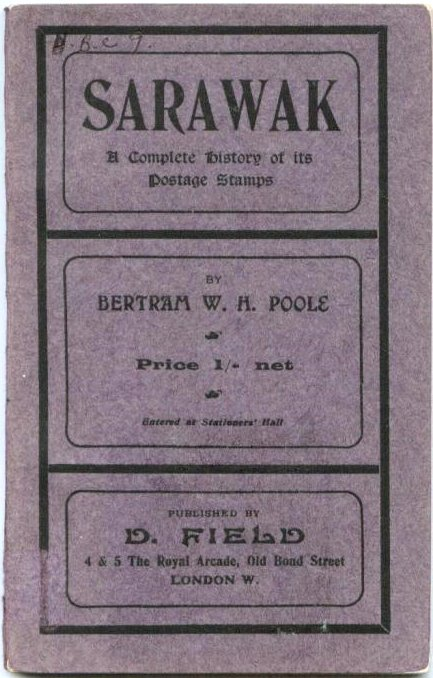
Poole's book Sarawak published by D. Field.

Bertram William Henry Poole (March 22, 1880 – September 8, 1957) was an American student of philately, and wrote numerous monographs on various aspects of the hobby. He was well known as a respected philatelist in Great Britain before emigrating to the United States shortly before 1913.

== British philatelist ==
Poole was editor of the West End Philatelist and The Philatelic Journal of Great Britain. He wrote extensively on British Colonies in all seven of the West End Philatelist Handbooks. He also wrote numerous articles on postage stamps and postal history of Bulgaria, Dominica, Seychelles, Sarawak and South Africa.

== American philatelist ==
Poole wrote a number of monographs on European and British colonial postage stamps which were published in Mekeels Handbook between 1912 and 1923. He contributed numerous articles to other philatelic journals and authored the books: The Standard Philatelic Dictionary in 1922 and The Pioneer Stamps of the British Empire in 1957. He also published his own Philatelic Opinion journal from 1912 to 1931. And, in 1917 he co-authored United States Virgin Islands with Julius (John) Murray Bartels.

== Collecting interests ==
Poole had a broad depth of collecting interests, but tended to specialize in stamps of Haiti and South and Central America. He was active in philatelic societies and was appointed judge at the 1913 International Philatelic Exhibition in New York City. Poole also was a stamp dealer and auctioneer.

== Honors and awards ==
Poole, as one of the original signers, signed the Roll of Distinguished Philatelists in 1921. He was named to the American Philatelic Society Hall of Fame in 1993.

== Selected publications ==
- Sarawak: A Complete History of its Postage Stamps. London: D. Field, 1906.
- The Stamps of Cook Islands. Boston: Mekeel-Severn-Wylie, 1912. (Mekeels Handbook #1)
