= Philip Silver =

- Born: 1910
- Died: July 1999 (aged 88–89); Elberon, NJ
- Education: BA, City College of New York
- Spouse: Alma Mirnofsky Silver
- Children: David
- Parent(s): Nathan Silver, Dora Grossman Silver
- Engineering career
- Discipline: Accountant
- Institutions: Collectors Club of New York; Philatelic Foundation
- Projects: Studied and wrote extensively on air mail stamps; president of Collectors Club of New York, and philatelic exhibition judge.
- Significant advance: Discovered several First Flight stamped envelopes.
- Awards: Lichtenstein Medal; APS Hall of Fame; Luff Award

Philip Silver (1910–1999), of New York City, was a philatelist who specialized in the field of air mail stamps, known as aerophilately. He studied air mail stamps and postal history, and wrote extensively on the subject.

== Philatelic literature ==
Silver co-authored “Eleanor and Franklin D. Roosevelt Stamps of the World “(1965) with philatelist Jan Bart. He contributed to the Scott's Specialized U.S. Catalogue as well as to the Sanabria Air Mail Catalogue. And, for a number of years, he edited The Aerophilatelists Annals.

== Philatelic activity ==
At the Collectors Club of New York he held every office in the club, including treasurer, secretary, vice president, president, and trustee. He participated in various capacities at numerous philatelic exhibitions, and was also a trustee of the Philatelic Foundation.

== Honors and awards ==
Because of his extensive work in the field of philately and aerophilately, he received considerable recognition. He was presented with the Richard S. Bohn Memorial Award from Aero Philatelists, Inc. in 1965, the Award for Contributions to Aerophilately from the Metropolitan Air Post Society 1971, the Lichtenstein Memorial Award in 1972, the Gatchell Literature Award from AAMS in 1978, and the FISA Medal in 1978. He signed the Roll of Distinguished Philatelists in 1978 and received the Luff Award for Distinguished Philatelic Research in 1979. He was elected to the American Philatelic Society Hall of Fame in 2002.

== See also ==
- Philately
- Philatelic literature
