= Steven Walske =

American philatelist

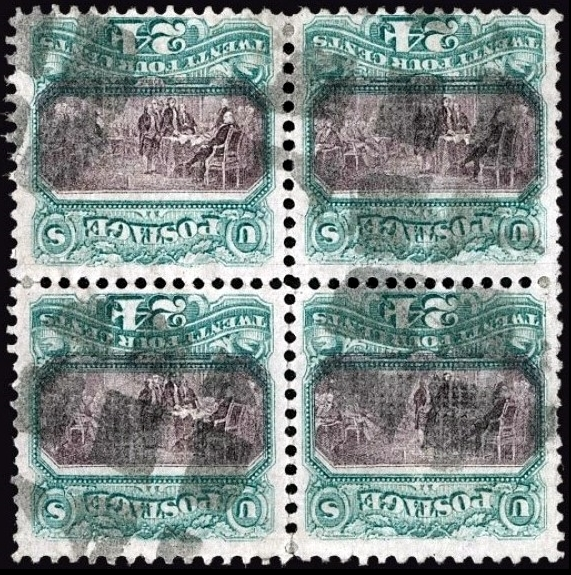
The block of four of the 1869 24c United States stamps with inverted centre once owned by Walske (shown inverted).

Steven Carl Walske is an American philatelist and philatelic writer. He was appointed to the Roll of Distinguished Philatelists in 2017.

He once owned the unique block of four of the 1869 24c stamps of the United States with an inverted center.

== Selected publications ==
- The Pony Express: A postal history. Philatelic Foundation, New York, 2005. (With Richard C. Frajola & George J. Kramer) ISBN 091198903X
- Special mail routes of the American Civil War: A guide to across-the-lines postal history. Confederate Stamp Alliance, United States, 2008. (With Scott R. Trepel) ISBN 9780981889306
- Mails of the westward expansion: 1803 to 1861. Western Cover Society, United States, 2015. (With Richard C. Frajola) ISBN 9780692324356
