= Louis Henry Barkhausen =

American philatelist

- Born: 1877
- Died: March 14, 1962 (aged 84–85)
- Engineering career
- Projects: Created one of the most advanced collections of United States postal stationery.
- Awards: APS Hall of Fame

Louis Henry Barkhausen (1877–1962), of Chicago, Illinois, was a stamp collector who specialized in the collection and study of American postal stationery.

== Collecting interests ==
Barkhausen investigated and studied the field of United States postal stationery, and created one of the most significant collections of the kind. It included cut squares (corners of envelopes containing the printed stamp), essay submissions to the Post Office Department, proofs created prior to the final printing process, and postal cards.

When he decided to dispose of his collection in 1955, Barkhausen broke the collection up into two parts: one part he donated to the Philatelic Foundation for use in their reference collection, and the second part he placed for sale with H.R. Harmer, Inc., with the selling taking two years and fetching spectacular prices.

== Philatelic literature ==
The Barkhausen collection was the basis for several books, including The Recut Two-cent U.S. Envelope Dies of the Series of 1904, published in 1950, and the Thorp-Bartels Catalog of U.S. Envelopes, published in 1951.

== Honors and awards ==
Louis Henry Barkhausen was named to the American Philatelic Society Hall of Fame in 1963.

== See also ==
- Philately
- Philatelic literature
