= Percy Gray Doane =

American stamp dealer (1877–1945)

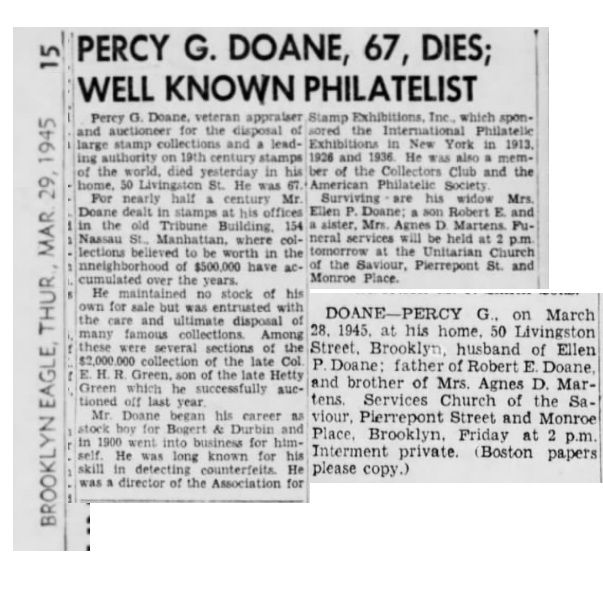
- Percy Gray Doane (1877-1945) obituary
- Born: January 13, 1878; Brooklyn, New York
- Died: March 28, 1945 (aged 67); Brooklyn, New York
- Resting place: Green-Wood Cemetery, Brooklyn, NY
- Occupation: Philatelist
- Known for: selling and expanding rare stamp collections, APS Hall of Fame
- Spouse: Ellen Perkins (married 1925)
- Children: Robert Emerson Doane
- Parents: Augustus Sidney Doane (father); Agnes Cazeau Beard (mother)

Percy Gray Doane (1877–1945) was a philatelic dealer from New York City. He was born in Brooklyn on January 13, 1878 and died there on March 28, 1945.

== Philatelic activity ==
Percy Doane established his philatelic dealership and auction house in New York City in 1897 and was highly respected within the philatelic community for his integrity.

Doane conducted a total of 348 auctions of postage stamps and related postal history material during his career. He assisted several notorious stamp collectors, including Col. E. H. R. Green, Judge Robert Emerson, Clarence Eagle and Benno Loewy, to build up or sell their collections or portions of their collections.

== Awards ==
Percy Doane was named to the American Philatelic Society Hall of Fame in 1946.

== See also ==
- Philately
- Philatelic literature
