= William Woodbury Hicks =

- Born: August 27, 1896
- Died: August 9, 1966 (aged 69)
- Engineering career
- Institutions: American Philatelic Society; National Philatelic Museum; Philatelic Classics Society
- Projects: Expert on classic United States postage stamps and railroad cancels
- Awards: APS Hall of Fame

William Woodbury Hicks (August 27, 1896 – August 9, 1966), of Pennsylvania, was a student of early postage stamps and postal history of the United States.

== Collecting interests ==
Hicks collected and studied the early classic stamps of the United States and was especially noted for his studies of the 3-cent 1851-57 issue and the 3-cent 1861 issue, of which he was a leading plater, which involves identifying the position of each stamp as it would have appeared on the original printed sheet.

William Hicks was also noted for his collection of postal cancellations used on United States mail carried by railroads during the period 1830 to 1861. His collection was considered the finest and most comprehensive of its kind at the time.

== Philatelic activity ==
Hicks was an active member of the American Philatelic Society and the National Philatelic Museum which was located in downtown Philadelphia, Pennsylvania.

== Philatelic literature ==
Based on his knowledge of studies related to classic United Stamps, Hicks wrote, in the Perforation Centennial Book, the history of the American Philatelic Society's Unit No. 11, otherwise known as the Three Cent 1851-57 Unit, and currently known as the United States Philatelic Classics Society.

== Honors and awards ==
William Woodbury Hicks was named to the American Philatelic Society Hall of Fame in 1967.

== See also ==
- Postage stamps and postal history of the United States
- Philatelic literature
