= Franklin Richard Bruns Jr. =

- Born: May 15, 1912
- Died: March 24, 1979 (aged 66)
- Engineering career
- Institutions: Smithsonian Institution; American Philatelic Congress; Society of Philatelic Americans; Collectors Club of New York
- Awards: Writers Hall of Fame; APS Hall of Fame; Lagerloef Award

Franklin Richard Bruns Jr. (1912–1979) of Maryland, United States, was a student of philately and served it in numerous ways, including writing a syndicated stamp collector newspaper column and serving as curator at the Smithsonian Institution.

== Philatelic literature ==
From 1932 to 1972 Bruns wrote a stamp collector column that appeared in thirty newspapers. And, from 1942 to 1948, he was editor of the Collectors Club Philatelist for the Collectors Club of New York.

== Philatelic activity ==
Bruns remained very active his entire life in advancing philately. At the American Philatelic Congress he was a founder and served in various positions, including president and editor. At the Society of Philatelic Americans he served as director, board secretary, and vice president. For the United States postal service, Bruns served on the Citizens Advisory Committee and was their director of philately from 1957 to 1962.

Bruns started his work at the Smithsonian Institution in 1951 by being named Curator of the institution’s philatelic collection. Over the years, he continued his work at the Smithsonian, serving as research associate and supervisor and curator of postal history from 1971 to 1977. At the Cardinal Spellman Philatelic Museum he served as its first curator, serving from 1957 to 1962.

== Honors and awards ==
Bruns received the Society of Philatelic American’s Lagerloef Award in 1972. He was named to the Writers Hall of Fame in 1979 and the American Philatelic Society Hall of Fame in 2005.

== See also ==
- Philately
- Philatelic literature
