= Charles Foster Richards =

American philatelist (1866–1944)

- Born: July 9, 1866
- Died: November 29, 1944 (aged 78)
- Engineering career
- Institutions: American Philatelic Society
- Projects: Expert on the postage stamps of Hawaii; wrote an early reference catalog of Hawaiian stamps
- Awards: APS Hall of Fame

Charles Foster Richards (July 9, 1866 – November 29, 1944), of New York City, was a lifelong stamp collector and a charter member of the American Philatelic Association (now called the American Philatelic Society).

== Collecting interests ==
Richards specialized in the collection and study of postage stamps of Hawaii, including postal history, revenue stamps, and postal stationery. As an early expert on stamps of Hawaii, he published, in 1916, A Check List of the Stamps of Hawaii - and More, and, in 1938, he added more material to it. He also wrote a paper entitled Hawaiian Stamped Envelopes which was included, in 1916, in Mekeel's Handbook No. 10, Postage Stamps and Stationery of the Hawaiian Islands.

== Philatelic activity ==
Charles Foster Richards remained active in philatelic organizations and spent much of his time studying counterfeit stamps and recommending that the backs of such stamps be marked by experts to show their lack of authenticity.

== Honors and awards ==
Richards was named to the American Philatelic Society Hall of Fame in 1945.

== See also ==
- Philately
- Philatelic literature
