= Lynne S. Warm-Griffiths =

American philatelist

- Born: July 26, 1923
- Died: August 22, 1990 (aged 67)
- Engineering career
- Institutions: Collectors Club of New York; American Philatelic Society; Philatelic Foundation
- Projects: Prize winning collector of stamps, and active in promoting philately
- Awards: APS Hall of Fame

Lynne S. Warm-Griffiths (July 26, 1923 – August 22, 1990), of New Orleans, New York City, and California, was a philatelist who created award-winning collections and helped stamp collecting by participating actively in various philatelic organizations.

== Collecting interests ==
Her philatelic collections were specialized and included collections of United States postage stamps used overseas between 1894 and 1904, United States Newspaper stamps, Periodical stamps and First Bureau Issues. Her collections won awards at major stamp exhibitions.

== Philatelic activity ==
Lynne S. Warm-Griffiths was very active within the philatelic community, serving in a number of posts at the Crescent City Stamp Club in New Orleans, at the Collectors Club of New York, and at the Federated Philatelic Clubs of Southern California. In addition, Lynne was active within the American Philatelic Society and at the Philatelic Foundation.

== Honors and awards ==
Warm-Griffiths was named to the American Philatelic Society Hall of Fame in 1991.

== See also ==
- Philately
