= Dorothy B. Blaney =

American philatelist

- Born: June 29, 1921
- Died: May 12, 1998 (aged 76)
- Engineering career
- Institutions: American Philatelic Society; United States Postal Service
- Projects: Advocate in involving youths in the hobby of stamp collecting
- Awards: Ernest Kehr award APS Hall of Fame

Dorothy B. Blaney (June 29, 1921 – May 12, 1998), of Pennsylvania, was the postmaster of Perryopolis, Pennsylvania, who became a leading advocate for encouraging youths to become stamp collectors. She was named to the American Philatelic Society's Hall of Fame in 1993.

== Collecting interests ==
Blaney collected postage stamps so that they could be used by the youth groups she created.

== Philatelic activity ==
When the United States Postal Service (USPS) introduced the Ben Franklin School Program in 1976, postmaster Blaney used it to great advantage by in the Pittsburgh, Pennsylvania, area by forming 700 stamp clubs for children. Because of her extensive participation and experience with the program, she was named an advisor to the program by the USPS and continued to devise new ways to motivate postmasters and schools in participation in the program.

When Blaney retired from the USPS, she continued her work in encouraging youth participation in the hobby of stamp collecting. She was a knowledgeable speaker, and spoke and lectured over 1,000 times to children, parents, and members of the USPS.

Blaney was active at various philatelic shows and exhibitions, encouraging participation by junior stamp collectors. She was named as chair of the Youth Activities Committee of the American Philatelic Society.

== Philatelic literature ==
Based on her experience in encouraging juniors to collect stamps, Blaney wrote Tips for Promoting Youth Philately.

== Honors and awards ==
Dorothy B. Blaney received numerous awards for her philatelic work, including the Ernest Kehr award. In 1999 she was named to the American Philatelic Society Hall of Fame.

== See also ==
- Stamp collecting
- Philatelic literature
