= Harry Weiss =

Harry Weiss may refer to:

- Harry Houdini (1874–1926), famous magician and escape artist also known as Harry Weiss
- Harry Weiss (philatelist) (1888–1966), American writer about stamps
- Hermann Weiss (1909–?), Austrian ice hockey goaltender
