= Barkhausen =

Barkhausen is a German surname. Notable people with the surname include:

- David N. Barkhausen (born 1950), American politician and lawyer
- Heinrich Barkhausen (1881–1956), German physicist from Bremen
- Louis Henry Barkhausen (1877–1962), American stamp collector from Chicago

== See also ==
- Barkhausen effect, the discontinuous change of magnetization in a ferromagnetic material when the applied magnetic field is changed
- Barkhausen stability criterion, in electronic circuits
- Barkhausen–Kurz tube, electronic vacuum tube oscillator
