= Everett C. Erle =

- Born: April 10, 1906
- Died: May 10, 1990 (aged 84)
- Organization(s): American Philatelic Society; San Jose Stamp Club; Council of Northern California Philatelic Societies; East Bay Philatelic Club
- Known for: Active in establishing philately in the San Francisco Bay area Chaloner award APS Hall of Fame

Everett C. Erle (April 10, 1906 – May 10, 1990), of Oakland, California, was a promoter of philately in the San Francisco Bay area.

== Collecting interests ==
Although Erle’s initial interest was in aerophilately, he eventually collected a wide range of philatelic topics, displaying them at various philatelic shows and exhibitions, as well as supporting other small clubs in the Oakland area by lending them frames of philatelic displays.

== Philatelic activity ==
Erle was an active organizer and supporter of philatelic organizations. He helped found a number of stamp organizations in the Oakland area, including the San Jose Stamp Club and the Council of Northern California Philatelic Societies. He served the Philatelic Research Society of Oakland (later renamed the Western Philatelic Library of Sunnyvale, California) as president, and the Oakland Philatelic Society (currently the East Bay Philatelic club), as treasurer, during his 60 years of membership with the East Bay club.

By 1975, Erle was a member of the American Philatelic Society for fifty years and attended many of its conventions and other activities. Because of his low membership number, he was given, shortly before he died, the honor of closing the meeting with a “sine die.”

== Philatelic literature ==
Erle was editor, from 1974 to 1986, of the Western Express, a journal of the Western Cover Society. He also had served as the editor of the West Coast Air Mail Society Journal.

== Honors and awards ==
Erle received the Chaloner Award for outstanding service and, in 1991, was named to the American Philatelic Society Hall of Fame.

== See also ==
- Philatelic literature
