= Philip Mathias Wolsieffer =

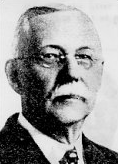
- Philip Mathias Portrait
- Born: May 28, 1857
- Died: October 20, 1934 (aged 77)
- Engineering career
- Institutions: Chicago Philatelic Society; American Philatelic Society
- Projects: Stamp dealer; later president of the American Philatelic Society
- Awards: APS Hall of Fame

Philip Mathias Wolsieffer (May 28, 1857 – October 20, 1934), of Chicago and Philadelphia, was a stamp dealer and auctioneer who sold stamps and philatelic items during the early years of stamp collecting.

== Selling stamps ==
From 1872 until he died in 1934, Wolsieffer remained active in selling stamps, first in Philadelphia, Pennsylvania, and then in Chicago, Illinois. In 1914, he moved back to Philadelphia and purchased the Philadelphia Stamp Company which he renamed as P.M. Wolsieffer. From 1897 to 1933 Wolsieffer conducted 341 major auctions. Wolsieffer was known for his invention of philatelic storage materials, such as the stock page (a slotted manila page used to temporarily store postage stamps) and the approval card, (a card with slots used to hold stamps), both of which he claimed to have invented.

== Philatelic activity ==
Wolsieffer was a founding member of the Chicago Philatelic Society, which was formed in 1886. He served the society in various ways, including as president and as vice president, and, because of his thirty years of dedicated work with the society, was named by the club as Life Member No. 1.

Wolsieffer also was a tireless worker at the national level of organized philately, becoming a charter member of the American Philatelic Association (later renamed the American Philatelic Society) and served, among other positions, as its president from 1924 to 1925.

== Honors and awards ==
Philip Wolsieffer was named to the American Philatelic Society Hall of Fame in 1941.

== See also ==
- Philately
