= Catherine Lemmon Manning =

- Born: January 24, 1881
- Died: April 14, 1975 (aged 94)
- Known for: Curator Emeritus of the National Postal Museum first woman to hold elective office at the American Philatelic Society; APS Hall of Fame

Catherine Lemmon Manning (January 24, 1881 – April 14, 1957), of Washington, D.C. served the philatelic community by her work in several philatelic societies, and the American public by her service at the National Postal Museum.

== Serving the Smithsonian ==
From 1922 to 1949, when she retired, Catherine Manning served as the Government Philatelist at the National Postal Museum, which is part of the Smithsonian Institution in Washington, D.C. She was subsequently named to the post of Curator Emeritus, a position she held from 1949 to 1957.

== Philatelic activity ==
Manning, during her early years, gained experience in philately by working for stamp dealers, such as Julius (John) Murray Bartels, in the Washington, D.C. area. At the American Philatelic Society, she was the first woman to hold an elective office in the organization, serving on the Board of Vice-Presidents from 1935 to 1937. At the American Philatelic Congress she served as a council member, and at the Bureau Issues Association, later renamed the United States Stamp Society, she was declared an honorary member. Manning was also a Trustee of National Philatelic Museum, located in Philadelphia, Pennsylvania.

== Honors and awards ==
Manning was honored by an award for her work from the Philadelphia's National Philatelic Museum in 1949. In 1990 she was named to the American Philatelic Society Hall of Fame.
