= Jeremiah Hess Barr =

- Born: 1876; Pennsylvania
- Died: May 26, 1955 (aged 78–79)
- Other names: Jehr
- Known for: Stamp collecting

Jeremiah Hess Barr (1876-1955), of Pennsylvania, was a stamp collector who was active in collecting and writing on philately.

== Collecting interests ==
Barr had a wide knowledge of philately, but specialized in certain fields, including United States Banknote issues, United States revenue stamps, and stamps of Lombardy-Venetia and the Ionian Islands.

Barr’s grandfather was Elias Barr who, in 1855, established Barr’s Penny Dispatch in Lancaster, Pennsylvania. Because of the close link between the two stamps of Barr’s Penny Dispatch (Scott catalog No. 8L1 and 8L2) and his grandfather, Barr took a special interest in collecting these Lancaster local post stamps.

== Philatelic activity ==
Barr was one of the founders of the American Philatelic Congress and as its president and editor. For six years, he also wrote a philatelic column in the Sunday Eagle newspaper of Reading, Pennsylvania.

== Honors and awards ==
Jeremiah Hess Barr was named to the American Philatelic Society Hall of Fame in 1955.

== Legacy ==
The Jere. Hess Barr Award for the best presentation at the annual American Philatelic Society Writers Forum was established by the American Philatelic Congress in his honor.

== See also ==
- Philatelic literature
