= Eugene Klein (philatelist) =

American philatelist (1878–1944)

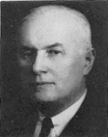
- Born: June 26, 1878; Hungary
- Died: April 30, 1944 (aged 65); Philadelphia, Pennsylvania
- Occupations: Stamp dealer Stamp collector Auctioneer
- Years active: 1911-1944
- Known for: American Philatelic Society president 1935-1937; APS Hall of Fame; Person who bought the "Inverted Jenny" sheet of 24-cent inverted airmail stamps

Eugene Klein (June 26, 1878 – April 30, 1944) of Philadelphia, Pennsylvania, was an internationally known stamp collector, stamp dealer, and auctioneer who was president of the American Philatelic Society from 1935 to 1937.

== Formative years ==
Born in Hungary on June 26, 1878, Klein was educated in Budapest and Vienna. As a youth, he developed an interest in philately.

== Philatelic activity ==
Klein was the official expert of the American Philatelic Society from 1911 to 1931 and its international secretary from 1928 to 1935 and 1937 to 1944. He also served as president (1935–1937) and international secretary again from 1937 until his death. He authored the 1940 book United States Waterway Packetmarks: Handstamped and Printed Names of Mail-Carrying Steamboats on the United States of America Inland and Coastal Waters, 1832-1899, called a seminal work by the American Philatelic Society, (APS), in a highly-collectable area.

His customers included King George V of Great Britain and U.S. President Franklin D. Roosevelt.

=== Honors and awards ===
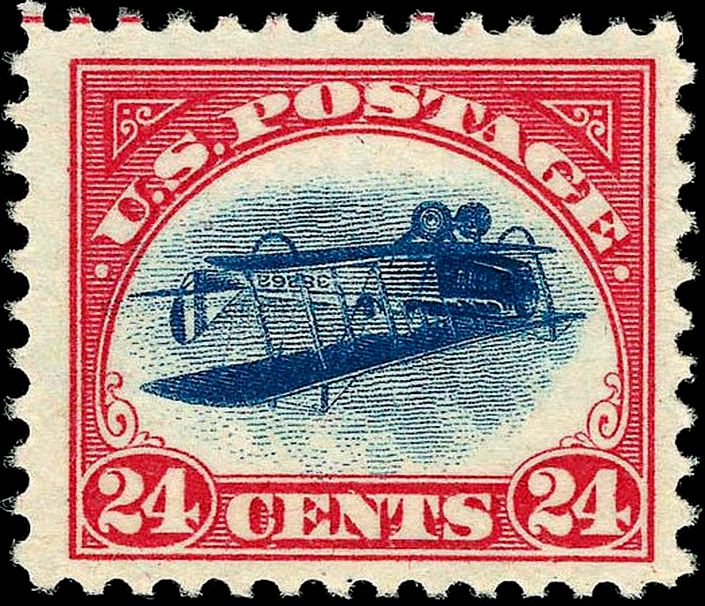
"Inverted Jenny," a 24-cent, U.S. Airmail stamp error in 1918

Eugene Klein was inducted into the American Philatelic Society Hall of Fame in 1944.

=== Inverted Jenny ===
Klein is remembered as the dealer who bought the sheet of the 24-cent Inverted Jenny 1918 United States air mail stamps from its finder, William T. Robey.

== Illness and death ==
In poor health during his final months, Klein died at the age of sixty-five at the Hahnemann Hospital in Philadelphia on April 30, 1944.
