= William Penn Brown =

American stamp dealer and philatelist

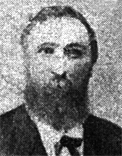
- Born: 1841
- Died: 1929 (aged 87–88)
- Engineering career
- Projects: Claimed to have been the second earliest stamp dealer in New York City; authored literature on philately
- Awards: APS Hall of Fame

William Penn Brown (1841–1929), of New York City, was an early pioneer in the hobby of stamp collecting. Brown was born in India of missionary parents and was raised in Japan before he came to the United States and started a successful business selling stamps in New York City in 1860.

== Philatelic activity ==
Starting in the 1860s, Brown was active in the business of selling stamps to stamp collectors in New York City, claiming to be the second earliest dealer of stamps in the city. He was acquainted with John Walter Scott and helped Scott financially when Scott decided to open a stamp business. William Brown was an early innovator in the operating of auctions of rare postage stamps, resulting in other auction houses eventually following his auction methods.

== Philatelic literature ==
In 1864 Brown was the editor of the London and New York Stamp Collectors Review, the first journal for American philatelists. He also published, in 1970, a catalog entitled The Curiosity Cabinet, which contained the first listing of United States locals, including his account of finding the New Haven postmaster provisional. He also wrote, later in life, his accounts of the early days of stamp collecting.

== Honors and awards ==
William Brown was named to the American Philatelic Society Hall of Fame in 2008.

== See also ==
- Stamp collecting
