= Robert P. Alexander =

- Born: November 26, 1904
- Died: August 24, 1985 (aged 80)
- Organizations: International Society for Japanese Philately
- Known for: Expert on Japanese stamps and postal history founder of the International Society for Japanese Philately
- Awards: APS Hall of Fame

Robert P. Alexander (November 26, 1904 – August 24, 1985) of Washington, D.C., was a collector and expert on Japanese classic postage stamps.

== Collecting interests ==
Although his collecting interests covered the entire scope of stamps and postal history of Japan, he studied and became expert in certain issues, such as the Dragon issues.

== Philatelic activity ==
Alexander wrote articles on specific aspects and postal issues of Japanese philately. He was a founder of the International Society for Japanese Philately in 1946 and once served as its president during his forty years with the society. He was also editor and contributor to Japanese Philately from 1950 to 1955.

== Honors and awards ==
Robert Alexander was inducted into the American Philatelic Society Hall of Fame in 1986.

== See also ==
- Philately
- Philatelic literature
