= Elliott Perry =

- Born: December 30, 1884
- Died: September 27, 1972 (aged 87)
- Spouse: Christina Westlake
- Engineering career
- Projects: Expert on postage stamps and postal history of the United States; specialized in the study of revenue stamps and local posts
- Awards: APS Hall of Fame

Elliott Perry (December 30, 1884 – September 27, 1972), of New Jersey, was a researcher and expert on postage stamps and postal history of the United States.

== Collecting interests ==
Although he collected, and was an expert on, all phases of United States stamp collecting, Perry’s interest led him to concentrating on revenue stamps, carrier and city post stamps. During his lifetime, Perry built up a number of specialized collections, which he then sold.

== Philatelic literature ==
Because of his research, Perry authored a considerable number of articles and monographs on his findings. He wrote for Mekeel's Weekly Stamp News under the pseudonym Christopher West and wrote numerous articles on revenue stamps for the weekly. The articles he wrote for Mekeel’s were so historically significant, that they were later collected and printed in three volumes by Castenholz and Company. He also wrote two additional handbooks for Mekeel’s, the first entitled The First United States Postage Stamp Otherwise Known as the United States City Despatch Post, and the second one entitled United States 1857–1860 Issues.

Perry also authored articles in the Collectors Club Philatelist, and these related to his plating of the 200 subjects of the U.S.-1847-10¢ stamp, which the Scott catalog recognizes as stamp No. 2 of the United States.

Perry also published his own journal entitled Pat Paragraphs. The articles were considered so valuable to stamp collectors, that they were subsequently arranged by topic by George Townsend Turner and Thomas E. Stanton, and published in 1981 in book form as Pat Paragraphs, by Elliott Perry.

Perry was unable to complete work on the three books he was writing prior to his death. His notes and finished portions of his books, however, were published posthumously by a number of philatelic publishers.

== Honors and awards ==
Perry was named to the American Philatelic Society Hall of Fame in 1973.

== See also ==
- Philately
- Philatelic literature
