= Ralph Andrews Barry =

American philatelist

- Born: November 30, 1883
- Died: December 10, 1939 (aged 56)
- Engineering career
- Projects: referred to as the “Dean of American Philatelic Writers”; edited newspaper stamp columns
- Awards: APS Hall of Fame

Ralph Andrews Barry (November 30, 1883 – December 10, 1939), of New York City, was a renowned writer of philatelic literature and was often referred to as the “Dean of American Philatelic Writers.”

== Philatelic activity ==
Barry was known not only for his philatelic literature but also for his encouraging the collecting of postage stamps and coins. He helped cover the events and exhibitions at various stamp shows and other philatelic events. At the New York Herald Tribune he was the stamp and coin editor from 1933 until he died in 1939.

Ralph Barry discussed the pleasures and techniques of the hobby of stamp collecting on various media, including on radio. He authored the book “A Glossary for the Stamp Collector” in 1936, and it was updated and revised in 1938 and 1940.

== Honors and awards ==
Because of his extensive work in encouraging stamp collecting, the Ralph A. Barry Award was established in 1942 and is given to writers whose newspaper stamp column quality deserves acknowledgement.
