= Lucien Berthelot =

- Born: November 6, 1903
- Died: October 30, 1985 (aged 81)
- Engineering career
- Projects: Re-established the field of French philately after the effects of World War II
- Awards: APS Hall of Fame

Lucien Berthelot (November 6, 1903 – October 30, 1985) of France, was a philatelist who helped restore the administration of French philately after World War II.

== Philatelic activity ==
Berthelot served the Fédération Internationale de Philatélie (FIP) as president and vice president during the period 1947 to 1972, helping the FIP to restore itself after the effects of World War II. He also served as president of the Fédération Français and was a member of L'Academie de Philatélie.

Berthelot helped re-establish and organize national and international stamp exhibitions, and served on their rules committees and juries.

== Honors and awards ==
Berthelot signed the Roll of Distinguished Philatelists in 1972 and was named to the American Philatelic Society Hall of Fame in 1986.

== See also ==
- Philately
- Philatelic literature
