= Clifford Washington Kissinger =

American philatelist (1874–1938)

- Born: February 6, 1874
- Died: January 28, 1938 (aged 63)
- Engineering career
- Institutions: American Philatelic Society
- Projects: Active in organizing philately in the Pennsylvania area
- Awards: APS Hall of Fame

Clifford Washington Kissinger (February 6, 1874 – January 28, 1938), of Pennsylvania, was a philatelist, known to his friends as Cliff, and to some of his fellow stamp collectors as “the little Napoleon of philately.”

== Philatelic organizing ==
Kissinger was an organizer of stamp clubs in the Pennsylvania area. He was particularly interested in establishing junior stamp clubs so that youth could be introduced to the hobby of collecting stamps. As part of his youth organizational efforts, he was one of the founders in 1891 of the Sons of Philatelia and then the rival Philatelic Sons of America where he served as its first president.

Cliff also served in various other philatelic societies: he was president of the Southern Philatelic Association, which was later known as the Society of Philatelic Americans. He also served with the American Philatelic Society, especially as secretary to the Publications Committee.

== Philatelic literature ==
Kissinger was also editor and publisher of several philatelic journals, including the Pennsylvania Philatelist and Kissinger's Philatelic Postal Card, the latter publication reportedly dedicated more to his ego than to advancing the hobby of stamp collecting.

== Honors and awards ==
In 1992 Kissinger was named to the American Philatelic Society Hall of Fame.

== See also ==
- Philately
- Philatelic literature
