= Philip Henry Ward Jr. =

American stamp dealer (1886–1963)

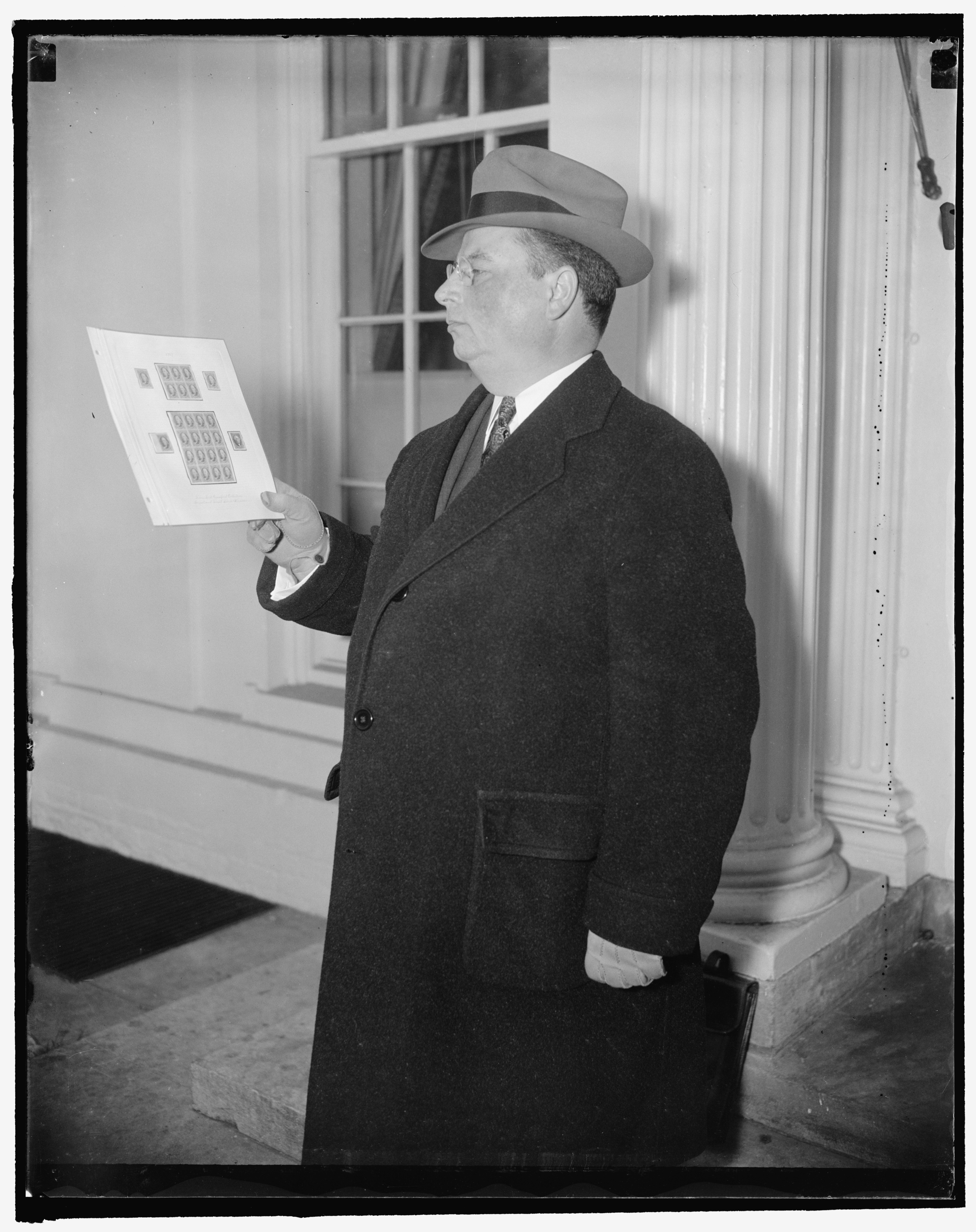
- Ward holding part of his $100,000 rare stamp collection which he brought to the White House to be viewed by President Roosevelt on December 9, 1937
- Born: November 26, 1886; United States
- Died: August 23, 1963 (aged 76)
- Occupation: Stamp dealer

Philip Henry Ward Jr. (November 26, 1886 – August 23, 1963), of Philadelphia, Pennsylvania, was a stamp dealer who created and sold collections of rare postage stamps, and was noted for his stressing the importance of first day covers of United States stamps.

== Collecting interests ==
Ward was noted for his specialized collection of United States revenue stamps which contained the only complete set of inverted centers, and which was retained by Hiram Edmund Deats in the 1950s.

Philip Ward created and sold important collections of philatelic material, such as large blocks of classic United States postage stamps, postage stamps of Japan, and worldwide postage stamps whose centers had been inverted, causing them to be expensive rarities. He also assembled and sold unusual and rare collections, such as Match and Medicine stamps and presidential letters and autographs.

Because he was located in Philadelphia, Pennsylvania, Ward was able to create and sell a collection of postal history of Philadelphia.

Ward was one of the first philatelists to recognize the importance of the issuance and collection of first day covers of United States stamps. He created some of the earliest, and now rare, first day covers.

== Honors and awards ==
Ward was recognized for his achievements by being named to the American Philatelic Society Hall of Fame in 1966.

== Legacy ==
The Ward Award for Excellence in First Day Cover Literature was established by the American First Day Cover Society in his honor.

== See also ==
- Philately
- Philatelic literature

== Sources ==
- Philip Henry Ward Jr.
