= Svend Yort =

American postage stamp collector (1908–1981)

- Born: 1908; Copenhagen, Denmark
- Died: July 24, 1981; Chevy Chase, Maryland
- Education: Lafayette College
- Organizations: Scandinavian Collectors Club
- Known for: Noted collector and writer of the postage stamps and postal history of Scandinavia; chairman of NAPEX and SIPEX
- Awards: APS Hall of Fame (1982)

Svend Yort (1908–1981) was a noted collector of the postage stamps and postal history of Scandinavia, and was a writer and expert on the subject.

== Background ==
Svend Yort was a native of Copenhagen, Denmark. He was the son of Jens Peter Yort (1879-1935) and Agnes Hogh Yort (1876-1936). He moved to the United States with his parents as a child. He graduated from Staunton Military Academy and earned a bachelor's degree in chemical engineering from Lafayette College in 1931.

== Collecting interests ==
Yort was a collector of stamps of Scandinavia, and was considered an expert on classic postage stamps and postal history of the area. He became a member of the Scandinavian Collectors Club of New York in 1944, and later served as its president from 1967 to 1970.

== Philatelic activity ==
Svend Yort was very active in philately in the Maryland/Washington, D.C./Northern Virginia area, often serving as president in local clubs. Nationally, he served as chairman of the first two NAPEX (North American Philatelic Exhibitions) during 1950 and 1964. He also served as chairman of the SIPEX (Sixth International Philatelic Exhibition) at Washington, D.C. during 1966.

== Honors and awards ==
Svend Yort was named to the American Philatelic Society Hall of Fame in 1982.

== See also ==
- Philately
- Philatelic literature
