= James Starr =

James Starr may refer to:

- James Harper Starr (1809–1890), namesake of Starr County in Texas
- James Starr (philatelist) (1870–1948), American philatelist
- H. James Starr (1931–2009), American politician
- James M. Starr (1961- ), biblical scholar and seminary president in Sweden
