= Edward Spring Knapp =

American philatelist

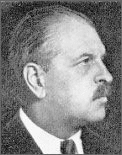
- Born: September 10, 1879
- Died: April 5, 1940 (aged 60)
- Engineering career
- Projects: prominent student of United States and Confederate States of America philately and postal history; created world-famous collections of postal history
- Awards: APS Hall of Fame

Edward Spring Knapp (September 10, 1879 – April 5, 1940), of New York City, was a philatelist known for his remarkable collections of postage stamps and postal history.

== Collecting interests ==
Knapp specialized in the postage stamps postal history of the United States and the Confederate States of America. However, he even specialized more within his United States collecting interests: his collection of posted hotel covers contained very rare items and was considered unsurpassed. His hotel covers collection won numerous awards including international ones in 1926 and 1936.

Knapp worked with Stanley Bryan Ashbrook on several projects, including determining the exact position of each stamp printed on a pane of stamps, called plating. Their work on plating the 5¢ New Orleans Confederate Provisional and the 10¢ Frameline are most notable.

== Sale of philatelic estate ==
Knapp died in 1940, and in 1941 and 1942 his collections were sold. The Confederate States of America collection was sold separately. However, the rest of the collection was massive and required three auction sessions to be conducted by Parke-Bernet Galleries before all the philatelic material was evaluated and sold.

Material in the collection sold at auction were photographed before sale, and illustrations of 7,822 philatelic items were published in 186 volumes and placed into the library at the Collectors Club of New York. Another set of three volumes entitled Philatelic Iconography: Being Illustrations of Rare and Unusual Stamps, Covers, and Cancellations Included in the Edward S. Knapp Collections was published in 1941, and it contained material not included in the 186 volumes. A copy is now located in the National Postal Museum at the Smithsonian Institution in Washington, D.C.

== Honors and awards ==
Edward Knapp was named to the American Philatelic Society Hall of Fame in 1941.

== See also ==
- Philately
- Philatelic literature
