= Nicolas Sanabria =

- Born: November 4, 1889
- Died: December 1, 1945 (aged 56)
- Known for: Issued several airmail stamp catalogs prominent aerophilatelist
- Awards: APS Hall of Fame

Nicolas Sanabria (November 4, 1889 – December 1, 1945) of New York City, was a philatelist concerned primarily with the field of aerophilately. His name is familiar to philatelists because of his Sanabria Catalog.

== Collecting interests ==
Sanabria was a dealer, auctioneer, and cataloguer of air mail stamps and air mail postal history of the world. He issued his first catalog in 1936, called “Standard Catalog of Airpost Stamps,” after acquiring rights from the Scott Stamp and Coin Company. He later renamed the catalog, in 1940, “Sanabria's Airpost Catalogue.” The catalog became the world standard for listing of airpost (air mail) postage stamps. He died in 1945 while working on a revised 1946 Sanabria catalog.

== Honors and awards ==
In 1951, Sanabria was named to the American Philatelic Society Hall of Fame.

== Legacy ==
Air mail stamps were issued by government post offices throughout the world from the beginning of the 20th century until a decade or so after World War II. Sanabria's catalog is a reminiscence of that important niche of philately, called aerophilately.

== See also ==
- Philately
- Philatelic literature
