= Joseph Britton Leavy =

Stamp collector of Washington DC

- Born: March 7, 1872
- Died: July 25, 1921 (aged 49)
- Engineering career
- Institutions: Smithsonian Institution
- Projects: First philatelist to serve officially at the Smithsonian Institution; editor of The American Philatelist
- Awards: APS Hall of Fame

Joseph Britton Leavy (March 7, 1872 – July 25, 1921), of New York City and Washington, D.C., was an active stamp collector who served at the Smithsonian Institution in Washington, D.C.

== Collecting interests ==
Leavy specialized in collecting the postage stamps and postal history of Belgium and the Netherlands.

== Philatelic activity ==
Joseph Leavy served at the Smithsonian Institution as the first "Government Philatelist" at the museum. He was responsible, during his eight years of work there, for building up the Smithsonian's postage stamp collection and arranging it for public viewing.

== Philatelic literature ==
While at the Smithsonian Institution, Leavy cataloged the institution's entire collection, recording it in Catalogue of the Postage Stamps and Stamped Envelopes of the United States and Possessions Issued to January 1, 1919 (dated 1919).

He also wrote, in 1912, The Postage Stamps of Holland (XIX Century), and, in 1918 and 1919 he was editor of The American Philatelist.

== Honors and awards ==
Joseph Britton Leavy was named to the American Philatelic Society Hall of Fame in 1995.

== See also ==
- Philately
- Philatelic literature
