= Ellery Denison =

- Born: November 1900
- Died: May 9, 1989 (aged 88)
- Engineering career
- Institutions: China Stamp Society
- Projects: Expert on Chinese postage stamps; president of the China Stamp Society for 25 years
- Awards: APS Hall of Fame

Ellery Denison (November 1900 – May 9, 1989), of Maryland, was a philatelist who specialized in the postage stamps and postal history of China.

== Collecting interests ==
Denison's interest in Chinese postage stamps began in the 1930s when he was in Hong Kong. He subsequently expanded his collecting and knowledge of Chinese philately and became a recognized expert of Chinese stamps.

== Philatelic activity ==
For twenty five years (1956 to 1981) Denison was the president of the China Stamp Society, and, after retirement from the society, continued on as president emeritus. At the same time, he was a frequent contributor of philatelic articles to its journal, the China Clipper.

Denison was active in philatelic activity in the Washington, D.C. area, which includes Maryland and northern Virginia, serving as president of several philatelic clubs. He was named a trustee of the NAPEX organization and a member of the Sixth International Philatelic Exhibition, SIPEX committee.

== Honors and awards ==
Ellery Denison was named to the American Philatelic Society Hall of Fame in 1990.

== See also ==
- Philately
- Philatelic literature
