= Peter Keller =

Peter Keller may refer to:

- Peter Keller (footballer) (born 1961), German former footballer
- Peter Keller (murder suspect) (1970–2012), American survivalist and murderer
- Peter G. Keller (1894–1972), American stamp dealer
- Peter Keller (tennis) (born 1944), Australian tennis player
- Peter Keller (politician) (born 1971), Swiss journalist and politician
