= James Starr (philatelist) =

American philatelist

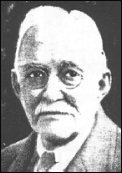
- Born: April 5, 1870
- Died: March 13, 1948 (aged 77)
- Engineering career
- Institutions: China Stamp Society
- Projects: Collector and expert of Chinese stamps; wrote on the subject.
- Awards: APS Hall of Fame

Major James Starr (April 5, 1870 – March 13, 1948), of Philadelphia, Pennsylvania, was one of the earliest philatelists who collected, studied, and wrote on, stamps of China.

== Collecting interests ==
Starr was particularly interested in studying the large Dragons of 1878-1883 as well as China's air post issues. His collections on exhibit were famous and award-winning. Co-authored with Samuel J. Mills, Starr wrote The Chinese Air-Post, 1920–1935, which was based on his own collection of Chinese postal history. It was published around 1937.

== Philatelic activity ==
Starr was a founding member of the China Stamp Society, the oldest affiliate of the American Philatelic Society and the largest English speaking Chinese philatelic organization worldwide. He was serving as its president at the time of his death.

== Honors and awards ==
He won numerous awards for his exhibits at national and international philatelic exhibitions. He signed the Roll of Distinguished Philatelists in 1947 and was named to the American Philatelic Society Hall of Fame in 1949.

== Legacy ==
Starr's intact China collection was sold at Sotheby's auction in 1991.

== See also ==
- Philately
- Philatelic literature

== References and sources ==
Sources

- "Major James Starr". Archived from the original on 2007-08-14.
