= David D. Caldwell =

American philatelist

Judge David D. Caldwell
- Born: January 5, 1870
- Died: March 5, 1953 (aged 83)
- Engineering career
- Institutions: American Philatelic Society
- Projects: Helped organize philatelic exhibition in Washington, D.C. served the American Philatelic Society as a lawyer
- Awards: APS Hall of Fame

Judge David D. Caldwell (January 5, 1870 – March 5, 1953), of Washington, D.C., was a philatelist known to his stamp collecting friends as “Washingtonʼs Number One Philatelist”.

== Philatelic activity ==
Judge Caldwell – an honorary title given to him by his philatelic friends – was very involved in the organizing of stamp collecting in the Washington, D.C. area. In 1937 he was responsible for organizing the National Stamp Conference, and, in 1940, he was chairman of the Postage Stamp Centenary Convention and Exhibition, which celebrated the centenary of the world's first postage stamp, the English Penny Black which was issued in 1840, an event that could not be celebrated internationally in England at that time because of British preoccupation with the start of World War II. Judge Caldwell was also one of the founders and a trustee of NAPEX (National Philatelic Exhibition) which, since 1950, held philatelic exhibitions in Washington, D.C.

Judge Caldwell was a member of the American Philatelic Society and served as its lawyer when the need occurred. He was also an advisor to the U.S. Post Office Department.

== Honors and awards ==
Caldwell was named to the American Philatelic Society Hall of Fame in 1953.

== See also ==
- Philately
