= Robert B. Brandeberry =

- Born: August 25, 1914
- Died: November 15, 1989 (aged 75)
- Organizations: Society of Philatelic Americans
- Known for: Expert on Philatelic fakes and forgeries president of SEPAD exhibition
- Awards: APS Hall of Fame

Robert B. Brandeberry (August 25, 1914 – November 15, 1989), of Delaware, was an expert on fakes and forgeries of rare postage stamps and postal history, and lectured extensively on the subject. He was very active in supporting the hobby of philately.

== Collecting interests ==
Robert Brandeberry was a stamp collector who paid special attention to faked or forged rare postage stamps which are intended to deceive collectors. As an expert, Brandeberry often lectured on the subject.

== Philatelic activity ==
Brandeberry served in a number of philatelic organizations, including the Society of Philatelic Americans, where he served as secretary and vice president, and at the American Philatelic Congress, the Council of Philatelic Organizations, and at the American Academy of Philately.

He also served as president of the national philatelic exhibition SEPAD (Southeast Pennsylvania and Delaware) in 1982.

== Honors and awards ==
Brandeberry was named to the American Philatelic Society Hall of Fame in 1990.
