= Harry Weiss (philatelist) =

American philatelist (1888–1966)

- Born: July 24, 1888
- Died: July 23, 1966 (aged 77)
- Engineering career
- Institutions: Midwest Philatelic Laboratory
- Projects: Wrote extensively on stamp collecting; later became philatelic advisor
- Awards: APS Hall of Fame

Harry Weiss (July 24, 1888 – July 23, 1966) of Illinois, was a philatelist who spent most of his philatelic career writing on the subject of stamp collecting.

== Philatelic literature ==
From the 1930s to 1960, Weiss wrote extensively on the hobby aspect of stamp collecting. He wrote columns in a number of periodicals, such as in the Weekly Philatelic Gossip, where he was the editor and would describe to his readers new postage stamps being issued, philatelic gossip, stamps that he felt would be desirable to purchase, and so on. He also wrote several other columns for the Weekly Philatelic Gossip: Canadian Round Table and Inside Straight. In 1961 Weekly Philatelic Gossip ceased publication, and Weiss continued his discussion of stamp collecting in Stamps, where he maintained a column entitled Stamp Market Tips until he finally died in 1966. Weiss married Pearl Drucilla Rank (1885–1959) in 1919.

During his tenure as editor of Weekly Philatelic Gossip, Weiss re-published a number of philatelic books, including, in 1943, The Postage Stamps of the United States by John Nicholas Luff, originally published in 1902.

== Philatelic activity ==
Weiss established in 1946 the Midwest Philatelic Laboratory, which provided a number of philatelic services, such as verifying the authenticity of rare stamps, a process known as expertizing; and other services, such as guidance to collectors on the mounting of stamps to prevent damage; assessing the value of a collection, a process known as appraising; and, providing advice on the sale and disposal of stamp collections. In 1961, he merged with Dorothy Fleischli and the organization was renamed Dorhar Philatelic Enterprises.

== Honors and awards ==
Harry Weiss was named to the American Philatelic Society Hall of Fame in 1967.

== See also ==
- Philately
- Philatelic literature
