= Charles P. de Volpi =

Canadian philatelist (1911–1981)

- Born: July 16, 1911
- Died: November 24, 1981 (aged 70)
- Engineering career
- Institutions: British North America Philatelic Society
- Projects: Expert on various aspects of Canadian philately
- Awards: APS Hall of Fame

Charles P. de Volpi (July 16, 1911 – November 24, 1981), of Canada, was an expert on Canadian postage stamps and postal history.

== Collecting interests ==
de Volpi started collecting stamps as a child and continued throughout his philatelic career. He created and studied specialized collections of postal history of parts of Canada, such as his collections of Hudson's Bay Company, the North West Company of Western Canada, and postal history of the Canadian fur trade that occurred in the 18th and 19th centuries.

== Philatelic activity ==
At the British North America Philatelic Society (BNAPS), de Volpi was one of the founders, and continued to serve the society in a number of offices. The society sponsored a number of philatelic conventions, and de Volpi made it a point to attend all of the until he was in failing health.

== Honors and awards ==
Charles de Volpi was named to the American Philatelic Society Hall of Fame in 1982.

== See also ==
- Philately
