= William Hogarth Tower =

- Born: 1871
- Died: December 14, 1950 (aged 78–79)
- Engineering career
- Institutions: Princeton University
- Projects: Dedicated his stamp collection to Princeton University Library
- Awards: APS Hall of Fame

William Hogarth Tower (1871–1950), of New Jersey, USA was a postage stamp collector who endowed a "stamp room" at Princeton University.

== Collecting interests ==
Tower created a number of stamp collections, each focused on one aspect of philately. His collections included English postal history mostly from the stampless period prior to the invention of postage stamps, as well as specialized collection of war covers and philatelic material related to Abraham Lincoln.

== Philatelic activity ==
Tower was able to convince Princeton University to create an academic-level "stamp room" containing philatelic material such as postage stamps, cancelled covers, and other items of postal history, and he was named curator by the university. With the assistance of the Society of Philatelic Americans he was able to solicit philatelic material to be used in the stamp room.

== Honors and awards ==
Tower was named to the American Philatelic Society Hall of Fame in 1951.

== Legacy ==
Upon his death, Tower bequeathed his valuable collections of postage stamps and postal history item to the Princeton University Library.
