= W. Hamilton Barnum =

American philatelist

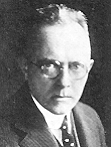
- William Hamilton Barnum
- Born: 1878
- Died: November 11, 1937 (aged 58–59)
- Engineering career
- Institutions: American Philatelic Society; Philatelic Sons of America
- Projects: Active in early days of philately in encouraging the growth of the hobby
- Awards: APS Hall of Fame

W. Hamilton Barnum (1878–1937), of Cleveland, Ohio, was a stamp collector who helped advance philately during the early years of the hobby.

== Collecting interests ==
Barnum started his collection of postage stamps in 1890 at the age of 12 and joined stamp clubs in his area, such as the Garfield-Perry Stamp Club in Cleveland, which he joined as a member in 1895 and served as club president in 1902.

== Philatelic activity ==
Barnum was active in organized philately. At the American Philatelic Society (then called the American Philatelic Association) he became an active member in 1894 and served the society in a variety of positions including being named to the Board of Vice Presidents. He was also active in the Philatelic Sons of America – the largest stamp club in the United States at the time—during the time when it started to attract young collectors. For the remainder of his life and philatelic career he made it a point of participating in all major activities of both philatelic societies.

== Honors and awards ==
For his efforts in establishing the hobby of stamp collecting, Barnum was named to the American Philatelic Society Hall of Fame in 1942.

== See also ==
- Philately
