= American Helvetia Philatelic Society =

Society for the postage stamps of Switzerland and Liechtenstein

- Formation: 1975 (lineage from 1938)
- Type: Philatelic society
- Headquarters: United States
- Region served: International
- Members: over 215 members from 11 countries (2026)
- President: Steven Opheim
- Vice President: Bob Zahm
- Secretary: Paul Sobon
- Affiliations: American Philatelic Society (Affiliate No. 52), Union of Swiss Philatelic Societies
- Website: https://www.swiss-stamps.org/

The American Helvetia Philatelic Society (AHPS) is an international philatelic society devoted to the study of postage stamps and postal history of Switzerland and Liechtenstein. Founded in 1975 in the United States, it is the largest English-language Swiss philatelic society in the world, with over 215 members from 11 countries as of 2025.

== History ==
The American Helvetia Philatelic Society was formed in 1975 through the merger of the Helvetia Philatelic Society of America and the Swiss American Stamp Society.

The society's lineage goes back to 1938, when the original Helvetia Society was founded and began publishing the Helvetia Bulletin (1938–1957), a journal of research on classic Swiss issues. After 1957, organized activity at the U.S. national level declined until the late 1960s, when two organizations revived interest in Swiss philately: the Helvetia Philatelic Society of America (publishing Helvetia Alphorn, 1969–1974) and the Swiss American Stamp Society (publishing Helvetia Herald, 1970–1974). The merger in 1975 created AHPS, which launched the bimonthly journal TELL. TELL continues as the society's journal, and all four publications are archived and accessible digitally.

Year	Event
1938	Helvetia Society founded; Helvetia Bulletin begins (1938–1957)
1957	Helvetia Bulletin ceases; activity becomes dormant
1969	Helvetia Philatelic Society of America founded; Helvetia Alphorn begins
1970	Swiss American Stamp Society founded; Helvetia Herald begins
1975	Merger creates AHPS; TELL launched (1975–present)

== Membership ==
Membership is open worldwide to collectors of all experience levels. As of 2025, the society counts over 215 members from 11 countries. AHPS emphasizes inclusivity and welcomes diversity in background, nationality, and collecting experience.

Members receive the bimonthly journal TELL, with access to the back-issue archive, and a digital subscription to the Helvetia Philatelic Society of Great Britain newsletter. The society holds monthly member meetings via Zoom featuring presentations and Show & Tell & Ask sessions, and runs member-only auctions. Members also take part in annual conventions and international stamp exhibitions in person, and have access to online research archives and guides.

AHPS members collect and study Swiss material from the cantonal issues of 1843–1854 through federal definitives, commemoratives, semi-postal (charity) issues, and modern issues including crypto stamps. Other areas of interest include postal history and postmarks, revenue and fiscal stamps, Liechtenstein stamps and postal history, and topical collections such as railways, landscapes, and art on stamps.

== Publications ==
AHPS and its predecessor societies have published English-language journals on Swiss and Liechtenstein philately continuously since 1938:

- Helvetia Bulletin (1938–1957), of the original Helvetia Society, focused on classic Swiss philatelic research
- Helvetia Alphorn (1969–1974), of the Helvetia Philatelic Society of America
- Helvetia Herald (1970–1974), of the Swiss American Stamp Society
- TELL (1975–present), of AHPS, which carries research, translations, Q&A, literature reviews, news, and dealer ads

Tables of contents, author indexes, and full back issues of all four journals are available through the AHPS website.

In addition to its in-house publications, AHPS and its members appear in wider philatelic literature. Richard T. Hall and George Struble published a short history of the society, "Communication through TELL and Zoom: The American Helvetia Philatelic Society," in Schweizer Briefmarken-Zeitung (SBZ), Nr. 5–6/2026, p. 58. Steven Opheim wrote about AHPS for the American Philatelic Society's The American Philatelist in December 2025. AHPS members also contribute regularly on Swiss philatelic topics: Richard T. Hall has written for Linn's Stamp News on Swiss folk festivals, the William Tell legend, Pro Juventute issues, and the borders on Switzerland's Arms issues. George Struble has contributed to Schweizer Briefmarken-Zeitung (SBZ), including a multi-part series on Swiss airmail rates to the United States from 1924 to 1939, articles on the 1920 Basel–Frankfurt airmail service, coverage of PIPEX 2023, and a two-part study (2025) of SCADTA from a Swiss perspective.

== Auctions ==
AHPS conducts member-only auctions of Swiss and Liechtenstein philatelic material several times a year.

== Awards ==
The society sponsors awards at exhibitions, including:

- Grand Award for best member exhibit at national conventions
- Swiss-themed gold, silver, and bronze medals at national-level exhibitions
- One-frame, novice, and youth awards
- Certificates for local show exhibits

== Affiliations ==
- Affiliate No. 52, American Philatelic Society
- Member, Union of Swiss Philatelic Societies
- Member, Collaboration Crew

== Online presence ==
AHPS runs a Facebook Group for members and others interested in Swiss philately. The society's website hosts the TELL archive, research documents, collecting guides, and online exhibits.

== See also ==
- Postage stamps and postal history of Switzerland
- Postage stamps and postal history of Liechtenstein
- Zumstein catalog
- Michel catalog
- Scott catalogue
- American Philatelic Society
- Royal Philatelic Society London
- Philatelic literature
