= Clifton A. Howes =

American philatelist

- Born: 1860
- Died: 1936 (aged 75–76)
- Occupation: Philatelist

Clifton A. Howes (1860–1936) was an American philatelist who signed the Roll of Distinguished Philatelists in 1921. He was president of the American Philatelic Society from 1915 to 1917.
