= Leon Vincent Rapkin =

English philatelist

- Born: 10 March 1929
- Died: 23 September 1991 (aged 62)
- Engineering career
- Institutions: Royal Philatelic Society London; Germany and Colonies Philatelic Society; British Philatelic Federation
- Projects: Created a world famous collection of early German postage stamps; served offices in various British philatelic organizations
- Awards: Roll of Distinguished Philatelists; APS Hall of Fame

Leon Vincent Rapkin (10 March 1929 – 23 September 1991), of England, was a philatelist who was active in various British philatelic organizations.

== Collecting interests ==
Rapkin was well known for his collection of classic German postage stamps and postal history, including German colonies and German post offices in other countries.

== Philatelic activity ==
Leon Rapkin served on the boards of various international philatelic exhibitions held in England between 1980 and 1990. He served the Royal Philatelic Society London as council member and vice president, the Germany and Colonies Philatelic Society as chairman and president, and, the British Philatelic Federation, also as chairman and president. He also served as the Keeper of the Roll of Distinguished Philatelists.

== Honors and awards ==
Leon Vincent Rapkin was named to the Keeper of the Roll of Distinguished Philatelists in 1984, and, in 1992, he was named to the American Philatelic Society Hall of Fame.

== See also ==
- Franceska Rapkin
- Postage stamps and postal history of Germany
