= Franceska Rapkin =

British philatelist

- Born: May 13, 1936
- Died: December 13, 2001 (aged 65)

Franceska Rapkin (15 May 1936 – 13 December 2001) was a British thematic philatelist who was appointed to the Roll of Distinguished Philatelists in 1998. She was the first chairperson of the British Thematic Association.

She was a refugee with her parents from Nazi Germany.

She was the first British philatelist to win a gold medal for a thematic exhibit which she did with her entry, "1936 Olympic Games" at ISRAPHIL ’85. In 1988, she received a second Gold model at OLYMPHILEX ’88. In 1989 she won the Congress Medal of the Association of British Philatelic Societies.

She is a member of the American Philatelic Society Hall of Fame.

== Selected publications ==
- Guidelines for Thematic Judges and Exhibitors at Local and Federation Level (c.1989)
- Guidelines for Successful Exhibiting (1991)

== See also ==
- Leon Vincent Rapkin
