= J. Murray Bartels =

American businessman (1871–1944)

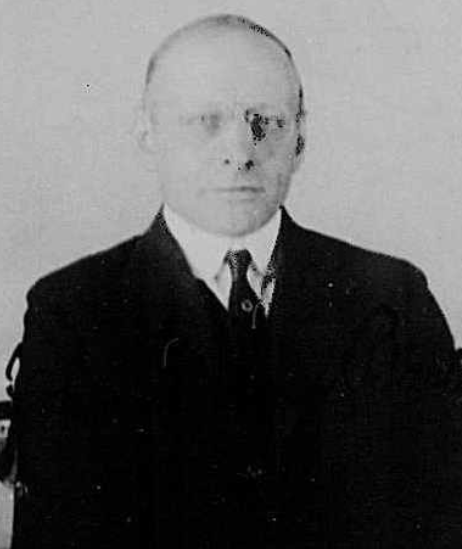
- John Murray Bartels in 1922
- Born: Julius Murray Bartels; July 15, 1871; Warrenton, Fauquier County, Virginia, U.S.
- Died: October 5, 1944 (aged 73)
- Other name: John Murray Bartels
- Occupations: Auctioned rare stamps; an authority on United States postal stationery

J. Murray Bartels (born Julius Murray Bartels; July 15, 1871 – October 5, 1944) was a New York City-based dealer and auctioneer of rare postage stamps. He was also well known for his knowledge of United States postal stationery.

== Family ==
Barthels was born in Warrenton, Fauquier County, Virginia, one of six or so siblings born to Hermann Friedrich Bartels and Sally Innes Bartels. His father was born in Germany.

== Collecting interests ==
Bartels was primarily interested in United States postal stationery and became an expert on the subject. He published the result of his studies in J.M. Bartels and Co.'s Catalogue and Reference List of the Stamped Envelopes, Wrappers and Letter Sheets in 1897, and several editions of Envelopes of the United States, from 1910 to 1938.

In 1943, he published a two volume set on stamped envelopes and wrappers. He published philatelic literature on other philatelic subjects, such as The Postage Stamps of the Philippines (co-authored with F.A. Foster and F.L. Palmer, in 1904), Bartel's Checklist of Canal Zone Stamps, in 1906 and 1908, and United States Virgin Islands (co-authored with Bertram William Henry Poole) in 1917.

== Philatelic activity ==
Bartels conducted 337 philatelic auctions. Among his most important sales were portions of the significant portions of the Clarence Eagle and Arthur Hind prize-winning collections.

== Honors and awards ==
Bartels was named to the American Philatelic Society Hall of Fame in 1946.

== Legacy ==
- Prescott Holden Thorp continued Bartels work with his publishing of "Thorp-Bartels" catalog editions.

== See also ==
- Philately
- Philatelic literature
