= Charles H. Coster =

Stamp dealer and financier (1852–1900)

Charles Henry Coster
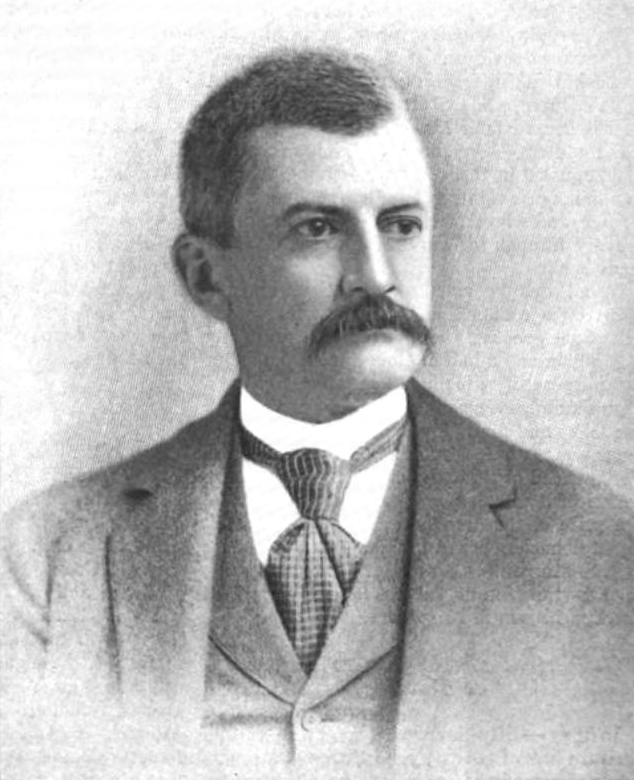
- Born: July 24, 1852; Newport, Rhode Island, United States
- Died: March 13, 1900 (aged 47); New York City, United States
- Occupation: Financier
- Known for: Wall street financier and stamp collector
- Notable work: The United States Locals and Their History
- Spouse: Emily Pell (m. 1886)
- Children: 4

Charles Henry Coster (1852–1900) was an American financier and noted philatelist. He was also the author of The United States Locals and Their History, a book considered to be the first major work on the private local posts in the United States.

== Early life ==
Coster was born on July 24, 1852, in Newport, Rhode Island. His ancestors were Dutch immigrants who settled in New York in the late 18th century. John Gerard Coster, his grandfather, was a native of the city of Harlem, the Netherlands. He and his brother, Henry, went to the United States and founded a mercantile house that became one of the most prosperous in New York. The family became prominent in the city's business and social world. It is claimed that the family was even represented in the novels of Edith Wharton - a relative - about New York's Gilded Age. Coster was the son of George W. Coster, John Gerard's youngest son, and Elizabeth Oakey. Coster was educated in private schools.

== Career ==
Coster began his career in business sometime in 1867 when he worked for Aymar & Co., an importing business. He remained with this company after it was acquired by Fabbri & Chauncey in 1872. He left in the latter part of 1883 and later joined Drexel, Morgan & Co. as a partner. This company became J.P. Morgan & Co., named after its founder J.P. Morgan. Coster became the general manager of Northern Pacific, a railroad company that J.P. Morgan reorganized.

Coster was recognized for is participation in rescuing struggling businesses, which some interpreted negatively. It was said, for instance, that "he got rich sitting up with sick railroads and going to their funerals". Together with Morgan, through Northern Pacific, Coster helped bankrupt railroad enterprises and give them new lease of life. He was tasked with finding solutions to problems, balancing the intricate and interwoven relations of railroad obligations, bonds, underlying bonds, collateral trust mortgages, and loan applications. During this period, he was characterized as Morgan's overworked partner, who had done the bulk of the spadework in reorganizations that Northern Pacific was involved in. An account described him as "a sort of financial chemist, and possessed a gift of analysis" that enable him to develop clear and sound solutions. This made it possible for Morgan to go ahead with structuring plans. Examples of companies that were successfully reorganized include The Southern Railroad, the Erie, the Chesapeake and Ohio, the Lehigh Valley, the Reading, and the Hocking Valley.

== Stamp collector ==
Coster reportedly began collecting stamps during his teenage years. By 1870, he was already considered one of America's most prominent philatelists. As a collector, he is considered prolific, while his interests in stamps were wide-ranging. This is demonstrated in his collections, which included U.S. locals and forgeries. His collection of stamped envelopes is said to be the best in the United States. Coster was a co-founder and vice-president of the National Philatelical Society during the 1870s.

Coster had also published books on U.S. locals and wrote extensively about stamp envelopes, postal cards and Confederate provisionals. Some of his notable works in this area was his published disagreements with the noted English philatelist, W. Dudley Atlee, and Edward Loines Pemberton. These involved the controversy about the descriptions and history of U.S. locals and Confederate provisionals.

== Personal life ==
He married Emily Pell in June 1886. The couple had four children: Emily, Charles Henry, Helen, and Maud. The family lived in 27 West Nineteenth Street, New York City.

Coster died from pneumonia on March 13, 1900, in New York. At the time of his death, he was at the prime of his life as a Wall Street financier.
