= Walton Tinsley =

American philatelist

Walton Eugene Tinsley (22 January 1921 – 12 April 1999) was an American philatelist who was added to the Roll of Distinguished Philatelists in 1983.
