= Jacob Weil (writer) =

German teacher and writer

Jacob Weil (1792 – November 18, 1864) was a German teacher and writer remembered for two editions of Fragmente aus Talmud und Rabbinen (the second in two parts, published in 1809 and 1811 respectively).

He taught in a Jewish "Philanthropin" in his birthplace of Frankfurt am Main, and ran what is described as an "educational institute" from 1818 to 1845.
