= Rossica Society of Russian Philately =

- Founded: 1929
- Founder: E. Arkhangelsky (Yugoslavia)
- Type: not-for-profit 501(c)(3) organization
- Purpose: from stampless covers to modern day issues
- Location: USA
- Region served: worldwide
- Method: chapters, newsletter, philatelic exhibitions
- Members: 300
- Key people: Ray Pietruszka, president
- Revenue: membership fees
- Website: Rossica Society of Russian Philately

The Rossica Society of Russian Philately (Общество русской филателии "Россика") is a society founded for the study and appreciation of the postage stamps and postal history of Russia.

== History ==
The society was founded in 1929 in Yugoslavia by E. Arkhangelsky. Administration of the society is now based out of the United States.

== Membership ==
Membership is open worldwide to all stamp collectors interested in Russian philately. Benefits of membership can be found on the Membership Page: http://www.rossica.org/membership.php

== ROSSICAPEX ==
The philatelic exhibition ROSSICAPEX, sponsored by the society, took place 25–28 June 2009 at the Santa Clara Convention Center, in Santa Clara, California. ROSSICAPEX was held in conjunction with the ASDA Stamp Show at the same venue.

== Rossica Journal of Russian Philately ==
The society publishes the Rossica Journal of Russian Philately, which was originally published in Russian, and is now published in English. The journal won the gold medal at SESCAL 2003, gold medals at NAPEX 2005 and 2015, and the vermeil medal at St. Petersburg, Russia, in 2007.

== Organization ==
The society is governed by a set of by-laws, and is administered by a board of directors, a president, vice president, secretary, treasurer, librarian and auditor. Current (2015) president is Ray Pietruschka of Madison, Alabama.

== See also ==
- Postage stamps and postal history of Russia
- 'The Journal of the Rossica Society of Russian Philately' Index content archive from 1998 No. 131/132 - 1954 No. 54

Rossica is not governed by a set of by-laws. They have a Constitution.
