= American Stamp Dealers Association =

The American Stamp Dealers Association (ASDA) is an international philatelic organization of stamp dealers.

== History ==
ASDA was founded in 1914 as an association “dedicated to promoting integrity, honesty and reliability, and we are the hobby builders of philately.” The ASDA is structured similarly to other philatelic organizations, with a president, vice president, treasurer, secretary, board of directors, general counsel, and various committees and regional chapters. It is located at 217-14 Northern Blvd., Suite 205, Bayside, New York 11361.

== Membership ==
Membership is open to all dealers and sellers of postage stamps and revenue stamps who agree to abide by the rules and regulations of ASDA. Several benefits of membership are: use of the ASDA logo, attending ASDA stamp shows which are held several times a year, receiving a membership directory and a subscription to the ASDA magazine.

== Society publication ==
The ASDA publishes a magazine entitled The American Stamp Dealer & Collector.

== Code of conduct ==
Members are required to abide by a Code of Conduct which requires, among other things, to abide by the ASDA constitution, to abide by all federal and local laws, to not buy or sell material which might be stolen, to correctly identify condition and grade of material, to clearly display terms of sale, to honor buying prices, to not produce or sell counterfeit material, and to submit disputes to arbitration.

== Miscellaneous benefits ==
In addition to providing membership to a valuable logo and reputation, the ASDA also provides members with an auction calendars, show calendars, and other information useful to the dealer of stamps.

== See also ==
- Philatelic Traders Society
