= Mortimer L. Neinken =

American philatelist

- Born: May 16, 1896
- Died: November 14, 1984 (aged 88)
- Engineering career
- Institutions: American Philatelic Society; The Philatelic Foundation
- Projects: Studied classic and rare United States stamps; continued the philatelic research of Stanley Bryan Ashbrook
- Awards: Luff Award; APS Hall of Fame; Lichtenstein Medal

Mortimer L. Neinken (May 16, 1896 – November 14, 1984) of New York City, was a collector and student of classic United States postage stamps. He studied with Stanley Bryan Ashbrook, and extended some of the philatelic literature work of Ashbrook.

== Philatelic literature ==
Neinken was primarily interested in 19th century United States postage stamps. He supplemented Ashbrook's work by publishing “The United States Ten Cent Stamps of 1855-1859” in 1960 and “The United States One Cent Stamp of 1851-1861” in 1972. Neinken also wrote “United States: The 1851-57 Twelve Cent Stamp (1964)” a work for which he received numerous honors and recognition.

== Philatelic activity ==
Neinken was active within the American Philatelic Society as well as at the National Philatelic Museum in Philadelphia. At The Philatelic Foundation he served as chairman and as expert.

== Honors and awards ==
Neinken received the Luff Award in 1962 for Distinguished Philatelic Research, the Lichtenstein Medal in 1971, and was recognized for Meritorious Service to Philately by The Philatelic Foundation in 1984, and was entered into the American Philatelic Society Hall of Fame in 1985. He was also the first recipient of the American Philatelic Research Library’s Cryer Research Award.

== Neinken medal ==
An award, first presented in 1981, when he received it in 1984 from The Philatelic Foundation, was renamed the Mortimer L. Neinken Medal for Meritorious Service in his honor.

== See also ==
- Philately
- Philatelic literature
