= The Philatelic Foundation =

- Founded: 1945
- Founder: Alfred F. Lichtenstein, Theodore E. Steinway, Louise Boyd Dale, et al
- Type: Not-for-Profit Organization
- Purpose: Certifying the authenticity of collectible stamps
- Location: New York City, USA
- Region served: Worldwide
- Method: Reference collection, philatelic library
- Subsidiaries: University of the State of New York
- Revenue: Certification fees
- Website: The Philatelic Foundation

The Philatelic Foundation is a philatelic organization granted a charter in 1945 by the University of the State of New York as a Nonprofit Educational Institution.

== Location ==
The Philatelic Foundation is located at 353 Lexington Ave Suite 804, New York, NY 10016.

== Philatelic expertise ==
The Philatelic Foundation maintains a reference collection of postage stamps and is a major source of authentication of rare and valuable postage stamps for stamp collectors who wish to know if the “valuable” stamp they have is authentic or counterfeit, and, if it is authentic, whether it is free of defect.

If the stamp submitted is authentic, a certification, containing a photo of the stamp and related technical details, is issued and sent to the person submitting the stamp.

Obtaining a certification of a valuable postage stamp by a stamp collector or a stamp dealer may be done for various reasons:

- personal satisfaction that the stamp purchased is authentic
- ease of subsequent sale of the stamp with its certificate of authenticity

== Publications ==
The Philatelic Foundation issues various publications on philatelic literature, including, for example, Analysis and Counterfeit Leaflets, quarterly magazines and bimonthly newsletters.

The Philatelic Foundation has long encouraged the creation of a diverse group of publications. This includes the “Opinions” books (I-VIII), The Pony Express – A Postal History by Richard C. Frajola, George J. Kramer and Steven C. Walske and Hawaii Foreign Mail to 1870 by Fred F. Gregory.

As part of being a non-profit, The Philatelic Foundation also keeps an up-to-date website which features various free resources for collectors. This includes recently expertized items, research articles, a section on fakes and forgeries, among much more.

== Other experts ==
Although the Philatelic Foundation is a recognized major source of philatelic expertise, especially of stamps issued in the United States, there are numerous other philatelic experts listed in stamp catalogs of various countries.

== See also ==
- Philatelic expertisation
- Philatelic literature
