= Stamp dealer =

Person who sells postage stamps

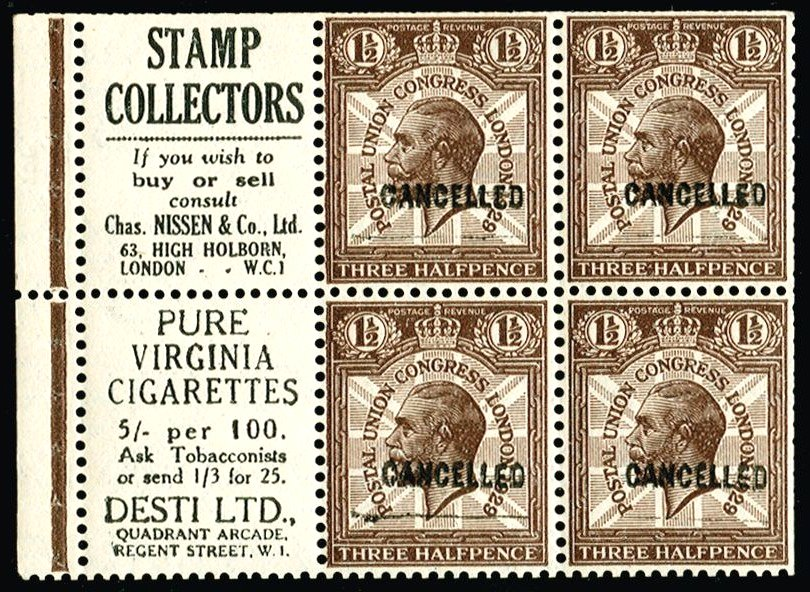
Advertising for the stamp dealer Charles Nissen on a booklet pane from the 1929 PUC stamps of Great Britain.

A stamp dealer is a company or individual engaged in the trade of stamps and philatelic products. This includes those who sell postage stamps for everyday use as well as revenue stamps for use on court documents. Stamp dealers who sell to stamp collectors and philatelists are of many kinds and their businesses range from small home operations to large international companies.

== Methods of sale ==
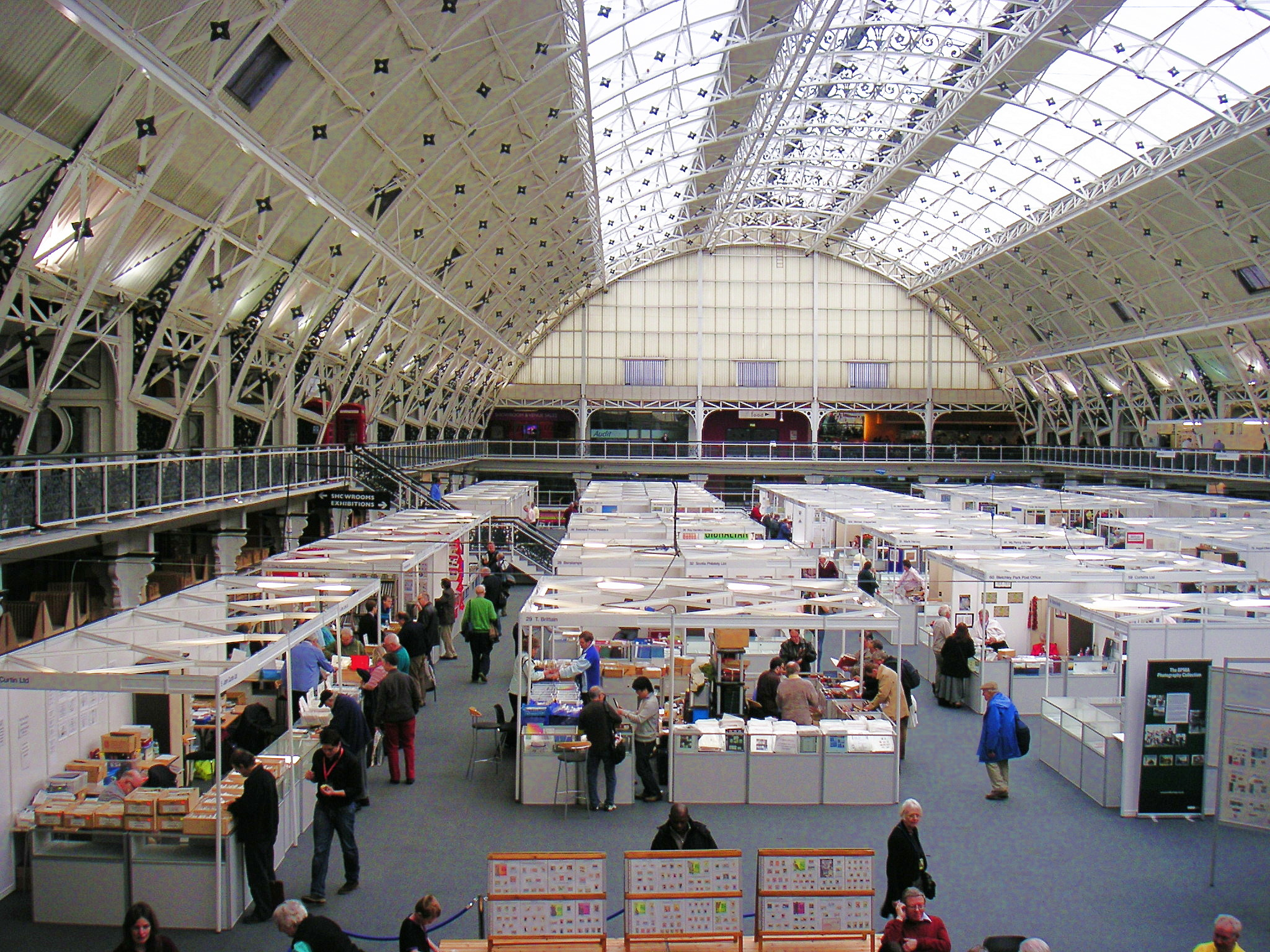
A large stamp show containing a bourse at which collectors and dealers meet.

Dealers may sell by mail order, at stamp fairs, at their own retail premises, through postal auctions or by sending packets of stamps on approval to collectors. Increasingly, dealers sell on internet auction sites like eBay or Delcampe. Dealers also vary in the type of material they handle, ranging from a general stock to highly specialised firms who only trade in particular countries or topical areas.

== Stamp catalogues ==
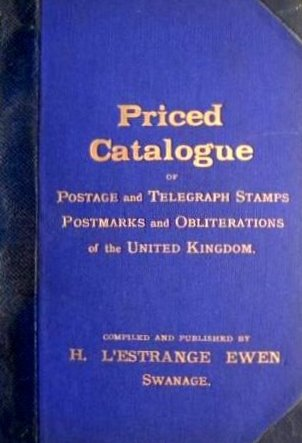
Herbert L'Estrange Ewen's Catalogue of Postage and Telegraph Stamps..., 4th edition 1895.

Stamp catalogues principally evolved from stamp dealer's price lists, though today most stamp catalogues no longer represent a retail price list. The Stanley Gibbons catalogue is an exception that, in principle, still shows the price at which they would sell a particular stamp over the counter at their London shop, or by mail order, if they had it in stock and it was in the exact condition outlined in the notes at the start of the catalogue. In practice, many items are not in stock, or are not in the same condition, or the price at which the stamp is for sale differs for some other reason from that shown in the catalogue. The Gibbons catalogue was originally published as a penny price list in November 1865.

== Size of the market ==
Unlike some other markets, such as stocks and shares, the majority of transactions in the philatelic or stamp market take place informally, by mail order or in retail environments, and therefore the size of the market is difficult to determine. It has been estimated at £5 billion. In a 2007 interview, Mike Hall of Stanley Gibbons estimated that "About $1 billion of rare stamps trade annually in the $10 billion-a-year stamp market." The number of collectors worldwide was estimated at 30 million in 2004. In 2009, Adrian Roose of Stanley Gibbons estimated the figure at 48 million including 18 million in China. It is not known how many of these are serious collectors.

== See also ==
- Philatelic investment
