= Philatelic literature =

Literature on the subject of postage stamps and postal history

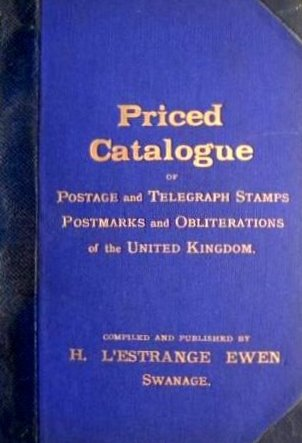
The cover of an early stamp catalogue from Herbert L'Estrange Ewen, 1895.

Philatelic literature is written material relating to philately, primarily information about postage stamps and postal history.

== Background to philatelic literature ==
Philatelic literature is held by stamp collectors and dealers, philatelic societies, and general and specialist libraries. The holdings of the British Library, for instance, are estimated at 30–35,000 works.

== Main types of philatelic literature ==
Philatelic literature is generally divided into the following categories:

- Stamp catalogues
  - Single country catalogues
  - Worldwide catalogues
  - Geographic area catalogues (e.g. Africa)
  - Time period catalogues (e.g. Reign of King George V)
  - Specialized catalogues (e.g. postmarks, plate blocks, perfins, etc.)
- Periodicals
  - Journals
  - Society newsletters
- Auction catalogues
- Books
- Bibliographies of philatelic literature
- Background material - Non philatelic material useful to stamp collectors. For example, currency exchange rates, maps, newspapers etc.

=== Stamp catalogues ===
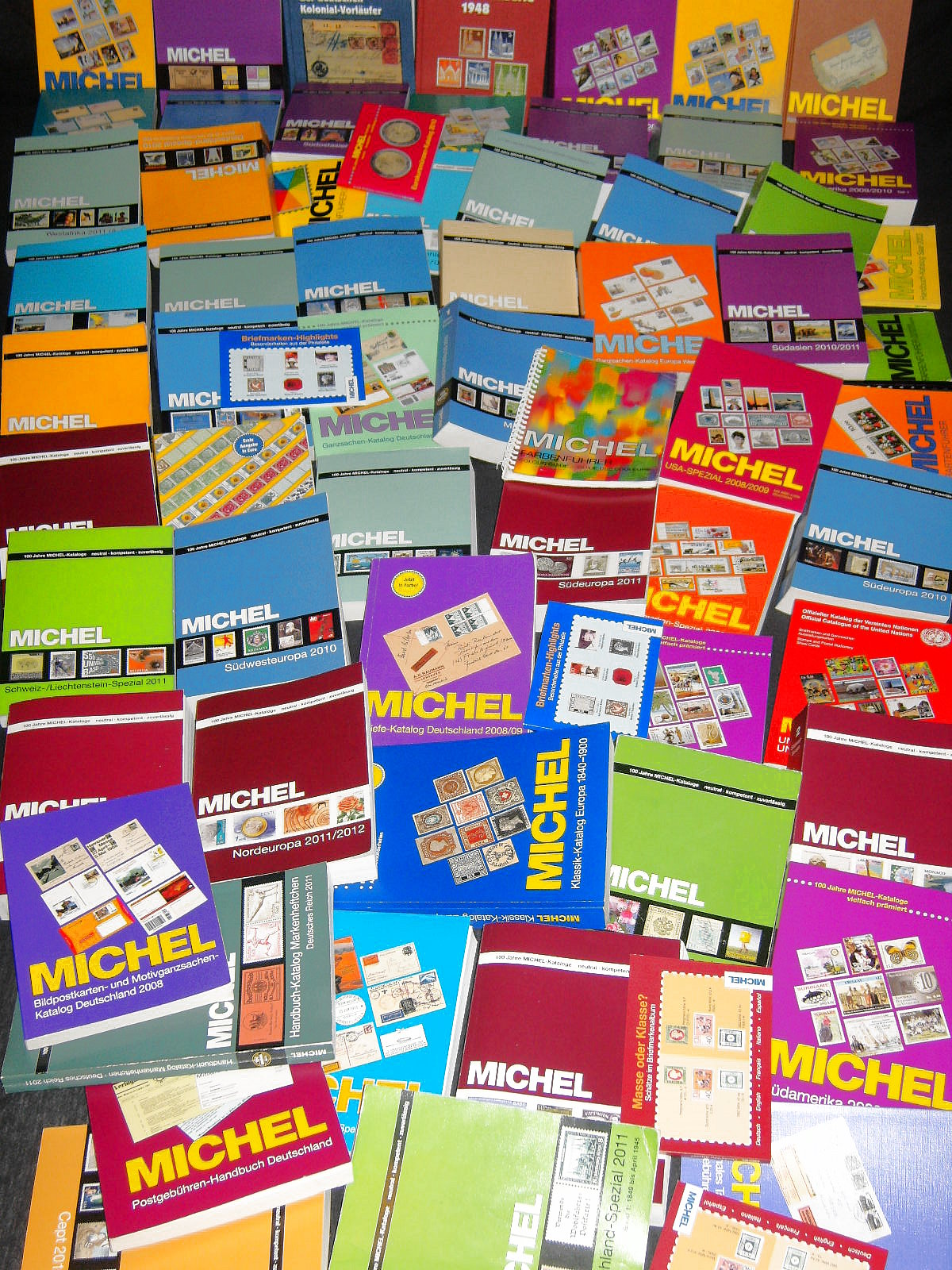
Catalogues from the Michel range.

Perhaps the most basic sort of literature is the stamp catalogue. This is basically a list of types of postage stamps along with their market values.

The first stamp catalogue was published in France by Oscar Berger-Levrault on 17 September 1861 and the first illustrated catalogue by Alfred Potiquet in December 1861 (based on the earlier work).

The first catalogues in Great Britain were published in 1862 by Frederick Booty, Mount Brown, and Dr. John Edward Gray. The first in the United States was The Stamp Collector's Manual by A.C. Kline (a pseudonym for John William Kline), also 1862.

Some catalogues, like the Michel catalogue and various one-country catalogues, offer a great deal of information going beyond the basic properties of each stamp type.

=== Single country books ===
Another common sort of book is the comprehensive "Stamps and Postal History" of a single country. These go beyond the basic date, denomination, and market price seen in the catalogues, explaining why particular stamps were issued, where and how they used, and more generally how the country's postal system worked in various periods.

=== Specialised studies ===
The next level of specialization is remarkable both for the level of minutiae and the number of works that have been published. Specialists write monographs summarizing everything that is known about a single type of stamp - the history of its design, the printing process, when and where the stamp was sold to the public, and all the ways it was used on mail. If the stamps is particularly rare (the Inverted Jenny or the missionary stamps of Hawaii), the book may actually include a census of every single copy known to exist. As might be expected, the audience is small, and the print runs of these books are small too. Classic works out of print may be much-sought-after, sometimes even more than the stamps they are describing!

Other kinds of specialized work include comprehensive studies of postal usage in limited areas and times, perhaps mail in Montana Territory before it became a state, or mail from missionaries in Uganda before it became a British colony.

=== Philatelic journals ===
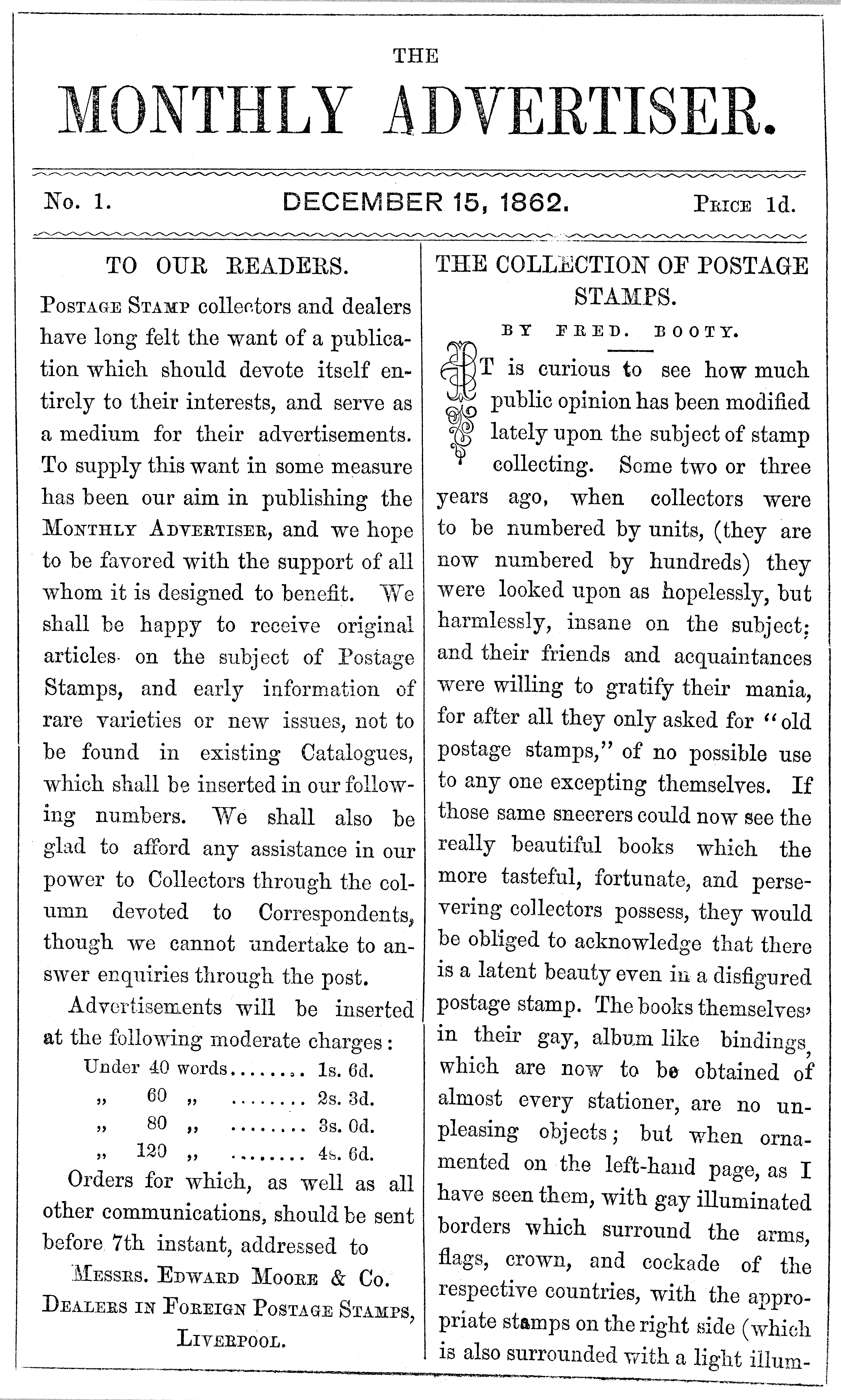
Front cover of first issue of the Stamp Collectors' Review and Monthly Advertiser, the world's first dedicated philatelic journal in 1862

In addition to books, there are a great number of philatelic journals. The first stamp magazine was the Monthly Intelligencer from Birmingham, England, followed shortly by many others. The journals and newsletters of clubs and societies also have an important role in philatelic literature. Many journals only run for a few numbers and then cease but they often contain information found nowhere else and therefore are valuable sources for philatelists.

Some popular philatelic periodicals are:

- The American Philatelist – worldwide topics with a focus on USA
- Canadian Stamp News – worldwide topics with a focus on Canada
- Deutsche Briefmarken Zeitung (Germany)
- Gibbons Stamp Monthly (UK) – worldwide topics with a focus on Great Britain and the British Commonwealth
- Linn's Stamp News (USA) – worldwide topics with a focus on USA

=== Philatelic bibliography ===
The scale and complexity of philatelic literature is such that it has its own journal, the Philatelic Literature Review, published quarterly by the American Philatelic Research Library.

There are also a number of libraries devoted solely to philatelic literature. (see link below)

== See also ==
- List of philatelic journals
- List of philatelic libraries
