= Supplementary Collection of the British Library Philatelic Department =

The Supplementary Collection of the British Library Philatelic Collections is a collection of mainly British Commonwealth philatelic material donated between 1900 and 1922, mainly by the Crown Agents. Almost all the material is unused, and the collection includes some important proofs. The collection is regarded as supplementary to the Tapling Collection. As of November 2007, the collection is held in 16 boxes.
