= Thomas Tapling =

English businessman and politician

Thomas Keay Tapling 1855–1891

Thomas Keay Tapling (30 October 1855 – 11 April 1891) was an English businessman and politician. He played first-class cricket and was also an eminent philatelist who formed one of the greatest stamp collections of his era.

== Early life ==
Tapling was born in Dulwich, London. He was educated first at home and then at Harrow School from age 15. Later he attended Trinity College, Cambridge, graduating BA and LL.B in 1880 and MA and LL.M in 1883. His father, also Thomas Tapling, was a businessman who made a fortune from the manufacture of carpets and household furnishings. His mother was Annie Elizabeth Tapling (née Keay).

Tapling originally intended a career in law, and he was called to the bar at the Middle Temple as a barrister.

In 1882, however, Thomas Tapling senior died and his son was forced to drop his plans and take over the family business of Thomas Tapling & Son. This does not appear to have been a burden and the business prospered and expanded, providing him with the money to travel and build his stamp collection. He had a reputation as an enlightened employer, who emphasised temperance and thrift to his employees.

== Cricket ==
Tapling played first-class cricket at the University of Cambridge, turning out for Trinity College, Trinity College Long Vacation Club and Cambridge University Long Vacation Club. He played for Marylebone Cricket Club (MCC) against Cambridge University in 1886, a match which has been retrospectively rated first-class by some sources; it was his sole appearance in top-class cricket. He was a right-handed batter and a wicket-keeper.

Tapling was invited to join George Vernon's team in the 1889/90 tour of Ceylon and India. He accepted but was late joining the squad after a close friend was taken ill in Italy and he opted to stay with him. Tapling arrived in India just before Christmas 1889 and played in six matches between then and the end of February.

== Politics ==
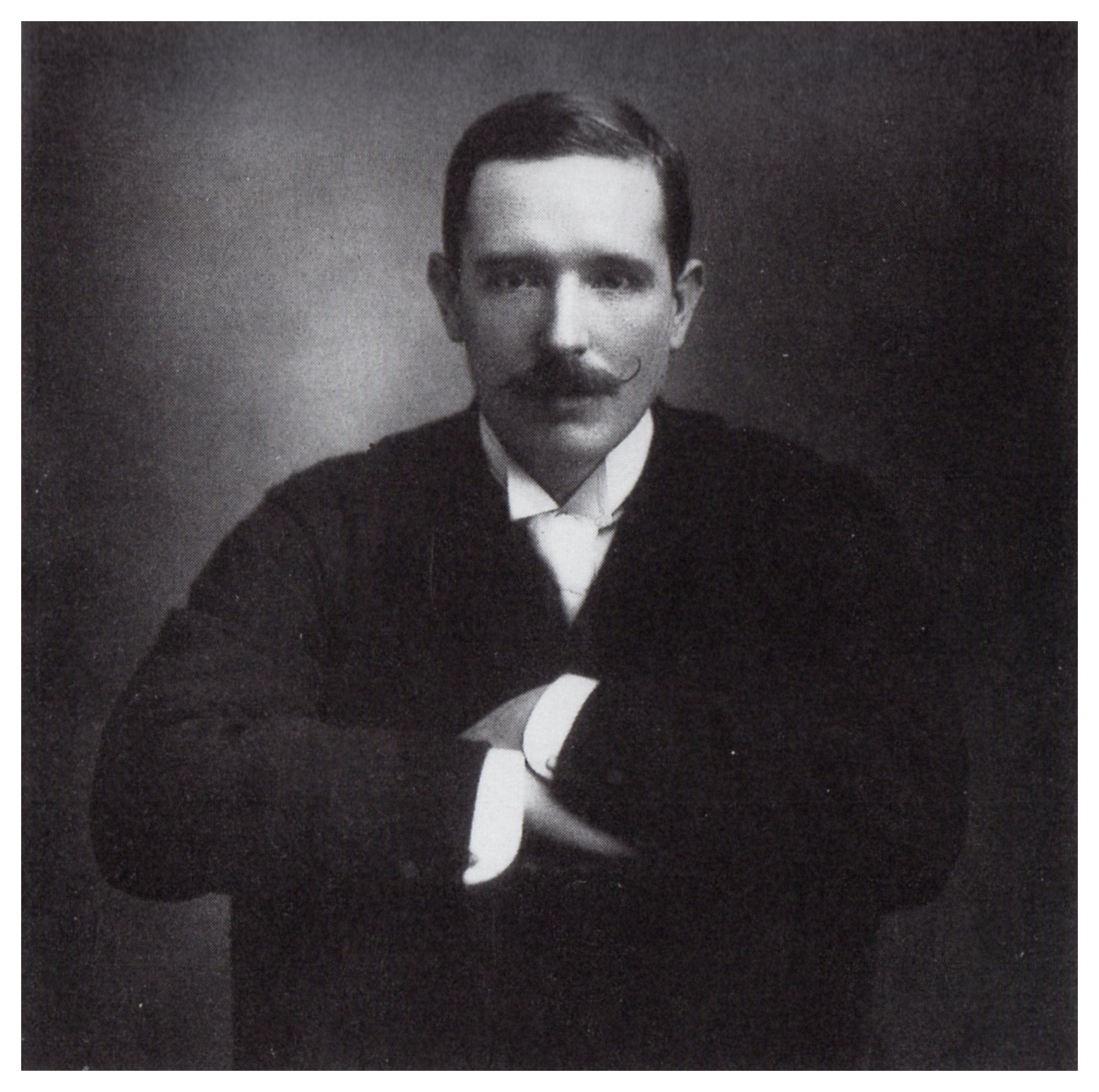
Tapling.

Tapling was a Conservative Member of Parliament (MP) for the Harborough Division of Leicestershire from 1886 to 1891. He was a member of the Standing Committee on Trade.

== Philately ==
Tapling began collecting stamps as a schoolboy in 1865. During the 1870s and 1880s he purchased existing collections from other philatelists, including those of William Image, W.A.S. Westoby, Edward B. Evans, and Gustave and Martial Caillebotte. By 1887 his collection was second only to that of Philippe Ferrari de La Renotière. Among his holdings were many world-famous rarities, including both values of the "Post Office" Mauritius and three examples of the Inverted Head Four Annas of India. It is the only intact private collection formed during the Nineteenth century, with examples of practically every stamp issued world-wide up to 1889.

In 1870 or 1871 Tapling joined the Philatelic Society in London (which subsequently became the Royal Philatelic Society London), being elected to its committee in 1876. He became vice-president in 1881 following the death of the former incumbent in a railway accident. The Tapling Medal, in silver, was created in his memory by the RPSL and first awarded in 1920. His name was recorded on the Roll of Distinguished Philatelists in 1921 as one of the original "Fathers of Philately".

== Death and legacy ==
Tapling died at the age of 35 of pleurisy at Gumley Hall, Market Harborough in Leicestershire.

His collection was bequeathed to the British Museum. It currently forms the Tapling Collection in the Philatelic Collections of the British Library. The collection includes these rarities:

- Gold Coast: 1883 (May) 1d on 4d magenta, unique;
- Great Britain: 1858–79 1d red, plate 77, one of a few known;
- Hawaii: 1851–52 2 cents to 13 cents (both types), the "Missionaries";
- India: 1854 4 annas blue and pale red, error head inverted, two used on a cover, unique;
- Mauritius: 1847 1d red used on cover and 2d blue, the "Post Office" issue;
- Spain: 1851 2 reales, error of colour, one of three known;
- Switzerland: Zürich: 1843 4 rappen, the unique unsevered horizontal strip of five;
- Uruguay: 1858 120 centavos blue and 180 centavos green, in tête beche pairs, two of five known;
- Western Australia: 1854–55 4d blue, error frame inverted.

The collection also includes a significant number of colour varieties of early United States postal issues.

Parliament of the United Kingdom
| Preceded by Thomas Paget | Member of Parliament for Harborough; 1886–1891 | Succeeded by Paddy Logan |
