= Postage stamps and postal history of Switzerland =

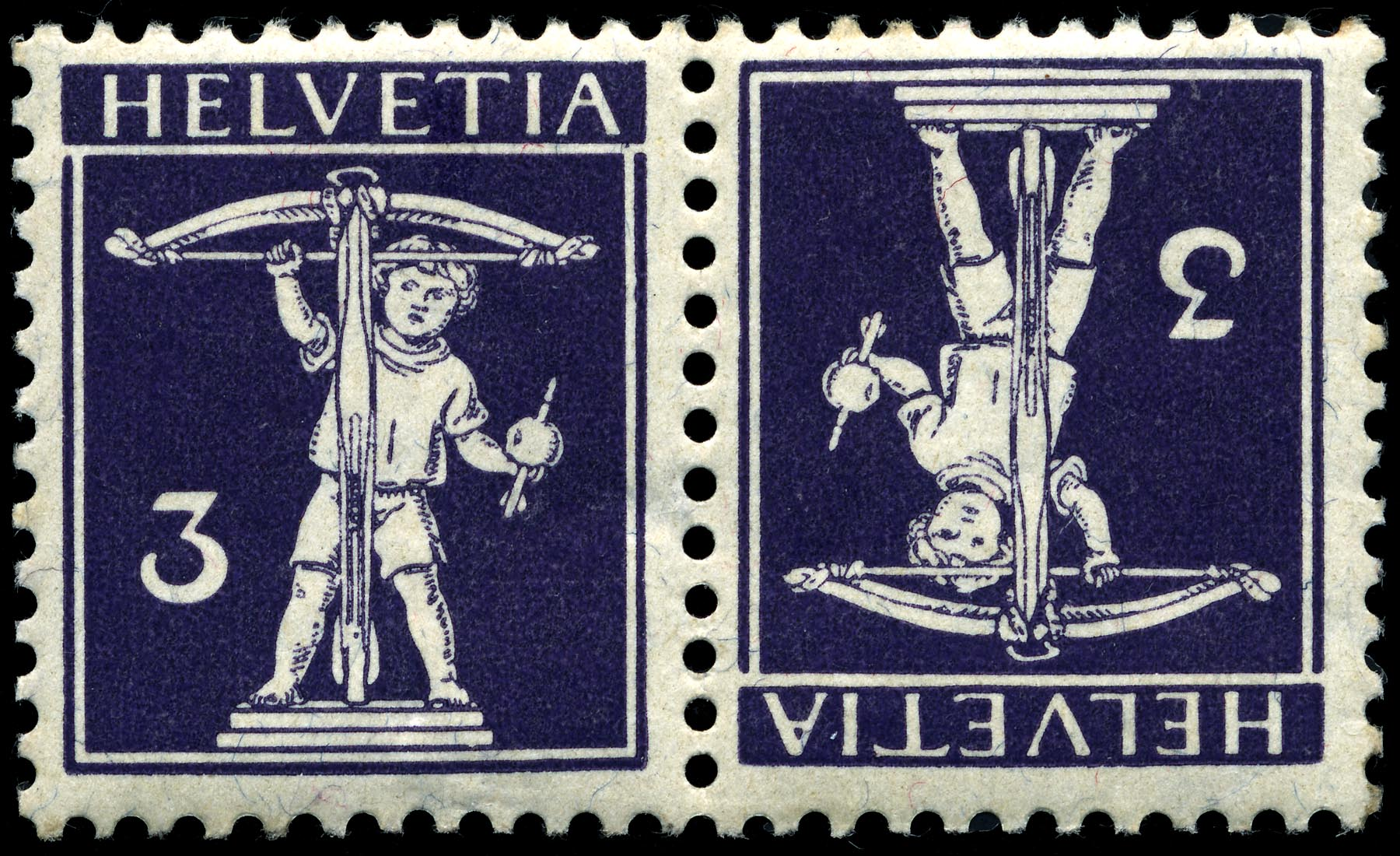
The Swiss stamps bear the indication "Helvetia" to indicate Switzerland.

This is a survey of the postage stamps and postal history of Switzerland.

== History ==
The first stamps used in Switzerland were issued by the cantons of Zürich (1843), Geneva (1843) and Basel (1845) for their own use, with the first federal issues coming several years later, on April 7, 1850.

By March 19, 1798, the Helvetic Republic had come into being; although it was not until September 1798 that the entire country was conquered. According to Napoleon, the country was "liberated" to form itself into a new State, which assumed the title of "Republique Helvetique Une et Indivisible." And, the Republic was administratively reorganized into twenty-two (22) Cantons. Later, that number was reduced to nineteen (19) due to mergers and to some changes at the frontiers. In September 1798, all postal mail was ordered to be "a natural and necessary property of the state" or, in modern parlance, nationalization was ordered.

Thus, the cantonal and private mail services were taken over. The country was then divided into five postal districts as follows: Berne, where Fischer Posts were entrusted with the administration of the mails; Basel; Zürich; St. Gallen; and Schaffhausen, where the administration was left in the hands of three mail farmers because of their close association with the Thurn and Taxis mails. The first Republican Decree of the Helvetic State relating to postal matters was one of suppressing the old and colorful cantonal uniforms worn by the letter carriers, and As a symbol of national service, a new uniform was issued in the Republican colors of green, red and yellow

Swiss stamps are inscribed with the word Helvetia, rather than "Schweiz", "Suisse" "Svizzera", or "Svizra". With four official languages - German, French, Italian, and Romansch. The Swiss would have had to put all four languages on each stamp, quite a problem to overcome with such limited space on a stamp. Switzerland is officially known by the Latin name "Confoederatio Helvetica" for historical reasons. "Confoederatio" means "confederation" and "Helvetica" is a reference to the Helvetians, a Celtic tribe that lived in Switzerland when the Romans invaded. The English equivalent of the Latin name is "Swiss Confederation." Hence, the use of Helvetia on stamps.

== Pre-stamp mail and cantonal Issues ==
The first Swiss stamps were those of the Cantons (States) of Zürich, Geneva, and Basel. These early Swiss stamps have another distinction. They were also the 3rd (1843), 4th (1843), and 5th (1845) adhesive postage stamp issuing nations of the World. Unfortunately, the Cantonal postage stamp issues are tremendously rare today.

=== Basel ===
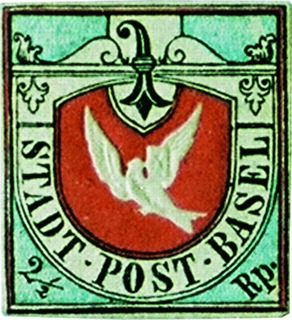
The Basel Dove was the world's first tri-colored stamp.

Basel issued their own stamp, the "Basel Dove" in 1845. This was a 2½-rappen value featuring a white embossed dove carrying a letter in its beak, and inscribed "STADT POST BASEL", a design by the architect Melchior Berry. It is printed in black, crimson, and blue, making it the world's first tri-colored stamp. A first printing in light green instead of the chosen blue was first believed to be a proof, but now acknowledged as first trial printing.

=== Berne ===
In 1675, Beat Fischer von Reichenbach was granted permission to operate a private postal service in Bern, Switzerland. The building next to the Berne Minster Gothic Chapel in Berne was used as a post office from 1675 to 1883. The service was named for him "Fischerpost". The service operated until 1832. Beat Fischer von Reichenbach was knighted by Leopold I, Holy Roman Emperor for establishing postal services between Germany and Spain. In 1975 a postage stamp dedicated to Beat Fischer von Reichenbach was issued in Switzerland.

In June 1799, the Seat of Government was transferred to Berne. A thorough reorganization took place at that time, and the post mark was changed to "Central Post Adminst. (for Central Post Administration). Therefore, there were two types of postmarks. Berne has a small 20 x 24 mm. mark which reads "Helvt. Republ. at top and "Central Post Bureau" at bottom, and in the center a "E" (for Eingegangen, received) and a "V" ( for Versandt, sent out). In the Lucerne marking, there was a line below the wording, and in the one used in Berne a small "posthorn" appeared. The post horn is synonymous in parts of Europe with the mail, and images of the instrument are still often used as a symbol of the post office. Postmen would often improvise or play well-known melodies on the horn to entertain those along their delivery. This even resulted in some reprimands from their superiors to stop playing “vulgar” opera arias that the post office thought undignified. The postal clerks were told to put a handwritten manuscript date after the "E" indicating the date the letter was received; yet there are examples of covers (envelopes) where the dates had not been filled in as ordered.

There are of course, recognized misprints called "Freaks" Some Bern covers dated June to December 1799, with the Central Post Bureau wording, and one cover that was dated July 1799, from Lucerne with the postmark applied in red ink; although the use of red ink had been curtailed earlier. The red ink was used in Lucerne from November 1798 to January 1799, when it was replaced with vermillion ink. The next time red ink markings would be found again would be on Berne post markings. This may indicate that when the Seat of the Government was changed, the red ink was taken from Lucerne to Berne for use there; but, perhaps at the last minute, a contingency developed and it was possibly also simultaneously used in Lucerne for a very short period.

=== Geneva ===
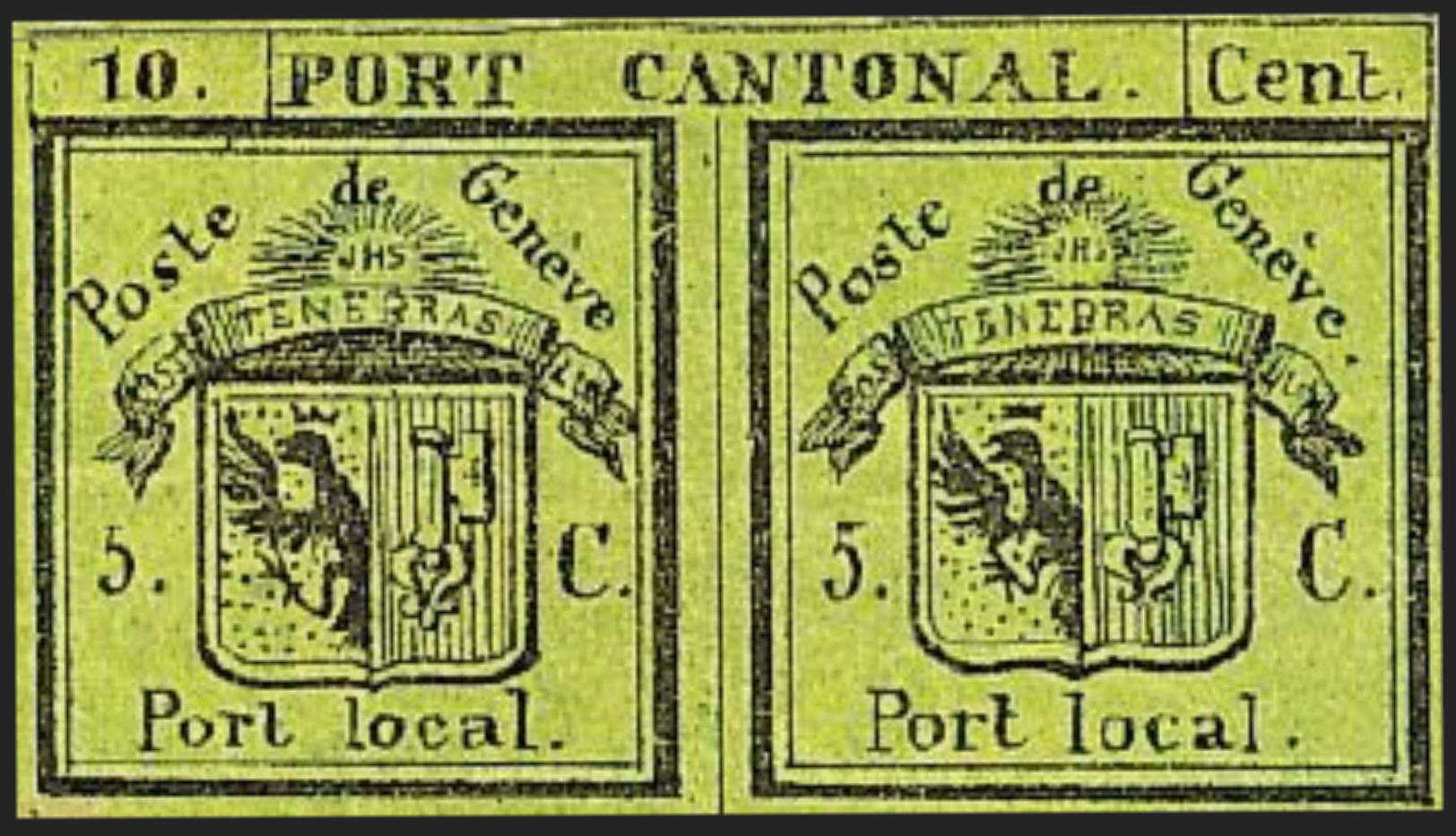
The "Double Geneva" was designed to be usable for both local and cantonal rates.

On September 30, 1843, Geneva issued their first stamps: the "Double Geneva", which was the world's first postage stamp in green colour. Like the first Zürich issue, it consisted of pairs of stamps; these were each printed in black on yellow-green paper, depicting the city's arms, and inscribed "Poste de Genềve" at the top and "Port local" at the bottom. But, an additional inscription, reading "10 PORT CANTONAL Cent" ran across the top of each pair. The idea was that the user could cut out a single stamp to pay the intra-commune rate, and a pair to make up the inter-commune rate. Only 6,000 of the doubles were ever printed, and as of 2008, intact used doubles typically go for around US$60,000 at auction. Very rarely, horizontally inverted pairs, and even more rarely, vertical pairs, can be found and are greatly sought after by collectors with values reaching sometimes US$150'000 to US$200'000 at auction.

In 1845, Geneva switched to conventional single 5c stamps. In 1849 it printed a 4c stamp featuring the federal cross, and similar 5c designs in 1850 and 1851.

=== Lucerne ===
Lucern was chosen as the headquarters seat for mail. All mail was handled through the Central Post Bureau, which was under the authority of the Minister of Finance All letters were handed into the central bureau for sorting and forwarding. At the bureau they received the first Helvetic Republic postmarks. Because all Postal Departments were in Lucerne, the volume of official correspondence was extremely heavy there; but purely private letters were quite rare. Such letters from Lucerne bore the title, "Central Post Bureau." These are known to have existed from November 1798 to July 1799.

=== Zürich ===
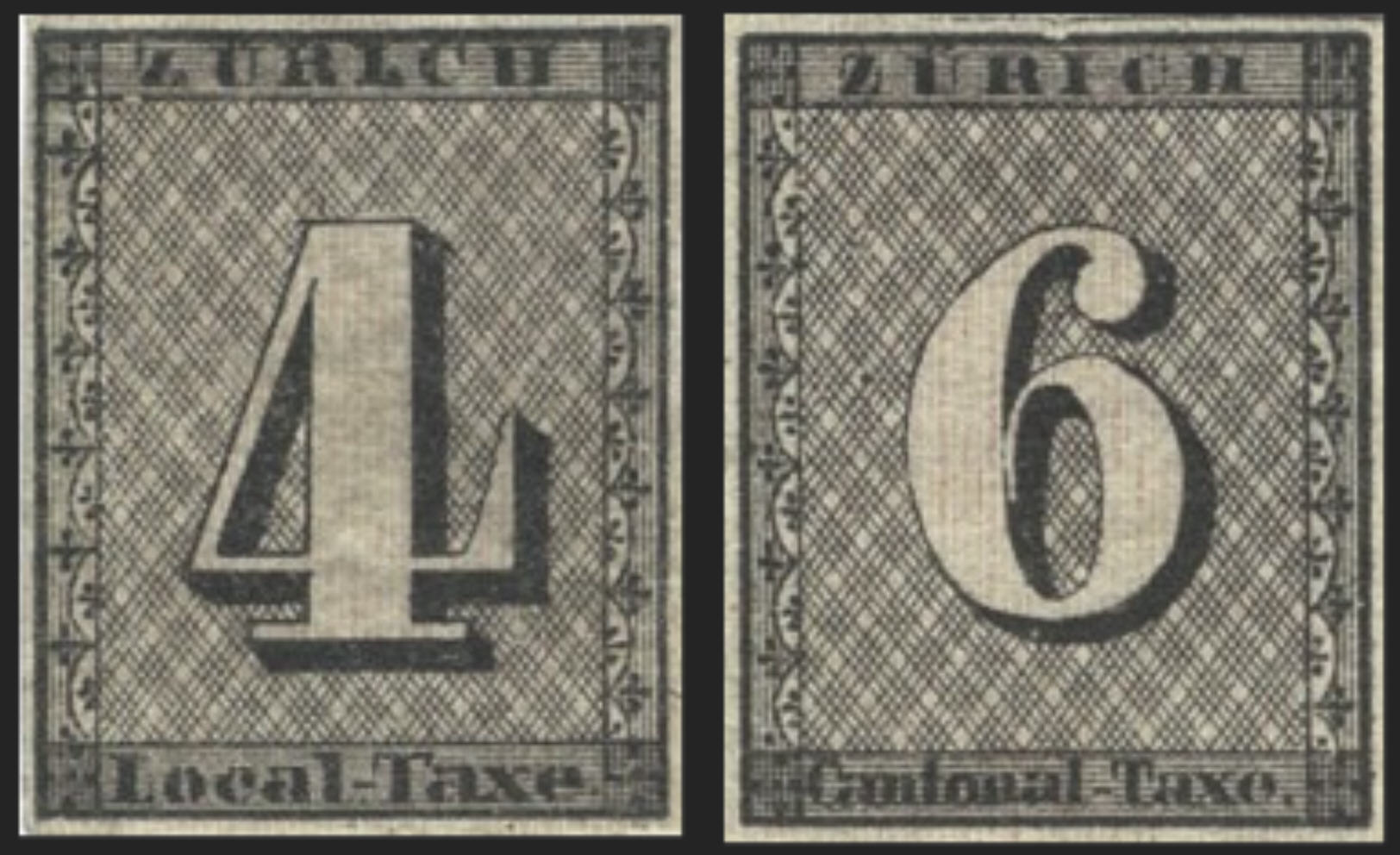
Monochrome image of the Zürich 4 and 6

On March 1, 1843, Zürich issued their first stamps, the Zürich 4 and 6, making it the second type of stamp in the world, after the UK's Penny Black three years earlier. The issue consisted of two imperforate stamps printed separately, each in five types, in sheets of 100, one with a large numeral "4" and the other with a "6", both inscribed "Zürich" at the top. The 4-rappen stamp was also inscribed "LOCAL-TAXE" at the bottom, since it was intended to pay for letters mailed within a city, while the 6-rappen, inscribed "CANTONAL-TAXE", was for use with letters going anywhere in the canton. The design was lithographed in black by Orell, Fuessli, and Company, with a pattern of fine red lines underneath, to discourage counterfeiting. Initially the red line were vertical, but starting in 1846 they were printed horizontal. These stamps were popular from the start, but were not printed in large numbers and are quite scarce today, with values ranging from US$1,500 to $20,000 depending on type. With the exception of one 6-rappen block of 9 (3x3) later split into a block of 6 (3x2) and a strip of three, all sheets were cut horizontally, so that no vertical pairs or larger are known to exist today.

Canton of Zürich also issued a stamp in 1850, known to collectors as the Winterthur issue, depicting the Swiss federal cross and a posthorn, which served as a transitional issue until the stamps of the Swiss federal government made their appearance later that same year (see under Geneva above).

== Federal issues ==
=== Local mail and rayon stamps ===
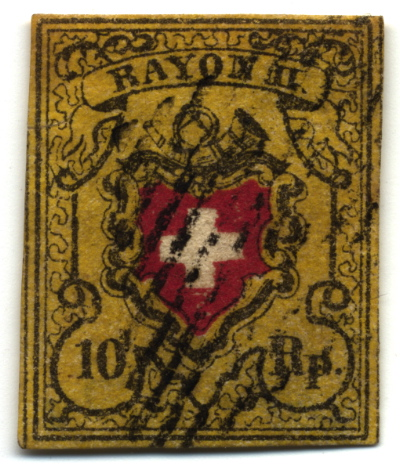
1850 10-rappen stamp of Switzerland

The adoption of the federal constitution in 1848 made it practical to issue confederation-wide stamps, and the first of these came out in 1850 (the exact date is uncertain). All used the same basic design, a Swiss cross surmounted by a posthorn, but there were a number of variations. The local-rate stamps had a value of 2½ rappen, with some inscribed "ORTS-POST" (German) and "POSTE LOCALE" (French). This was the first of many multi-language issues. For longer-distance mail, the 5-rappen stamp was inscribed "RAYON I" and the 10-rappen (for a greater distance) "RAYON II". Initially the stamps were issued with a black frame separating the white cross from the red background, but as a technically incorrect rendition of the Swiss arms, these were withdrawn.

In 1852 a 15-rappen/centime value inscribed "RAYON III" was issued, using the same design as previously, but printed entirely in vermilion. The "zone" (Rayon) system, in which the letter paid according to the distance travelled was later abolished: a fixed price took the mail to anywhere within Switzerland.

=== Helvetias ===
The classical definitive Swiss stamps were issued between 1854 and 1862, and were known as the Strubel Issues. They are the most popular specialization subject for most serious classical Swiss philatelists. Officially, these stamps are called The Imperforate Sitting Helvetia Issues of 1854–1862. These stamps feature a seated figure of Helvetia wearing a laurel wreath. She holds a spear in her right arm, and her left arm is resting on a shield, emblazoned with the arms of the Helvetic Confederation. The effect given by the shape of the wreath around her embossed head caused many German speaking collectors to jokingly refer to the design as "Strubel", referring to the visual effect of Helvetia having "unkempt" or "frizzy" hair. The nickname for these issues stuck, and just about every collector of Swiss stamps now refers to them as "The Strubels". This series of stamps have many, different variations including differing inks, paper, and paper thickness. Colored silk threads were used as a security device in the papers used to print the definitive Swiss stamps of 1854–1862.

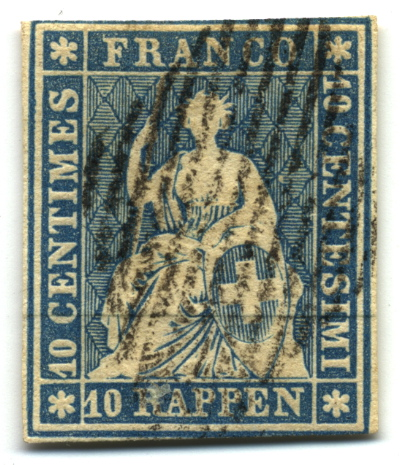
10 rappen, 1854, green thread

All of the preceding issues were declared invalid on 1 October 1854, and replaced with the seated allegorical figure "Helvetia", the first of several issues known as "seated Helvetias". The figure was embossed but only the outline was colored, making it rather hard to pick out. This was the first issue to deal with the multiple languages of Switzerland; in addition to the word "FRANCO" at the top, the other three sides listed the denomination in rappen, centimes, and (Italian) centesimi. The issue was also notable for the use of a colored silk thread running horizontally through the paper, as an anti-counterfeiting measure. (In the illustration to the left, the thread is faintly visible about 1/3 of the distance from the bottom of the stamp, looking almost like a crease.)

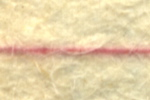
Closeup of the red thread embedded in the paper of the 1855 10rp stamp of Switzerland

A number of values were printed between 1854 and 1862, ranging from 5 rappen to 1 franc, and philatelists distinguish them further by type of paper and color of thread. The commonest type surviving today is the 5-rappen brown on thick paper with a green thread, costing US$20 used; certain other types are rare, and the pale yellow-green shade of the 40-rappen value will go for $7,000 or more.

A new design with more legible seated Helvetia appeared in 1862, now sporting a "watermark" consisting of a cross inside an ellipse (not a true watermark because it was impressed into the paper after printing), and for the first time, perforations. The units of currency disappeared, with "HELVETIA" inscribed at the top and "FRANCO" at the bottom. Initially printed on white wove paper, the stamps switched to granite paper in 1881. (The paper has red and blue silk threads, clearly visible in the larger image of the stamp to the left.) The stamps continued in use until 1883; many of them are common and cheaply available today, although legitimate cancellations on the granite paper varieties are uncommon because of the short period of use.

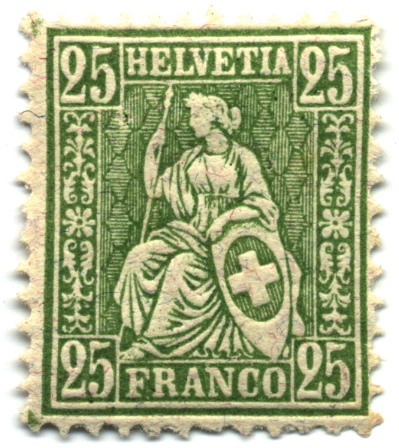
25 centimes, 1881, granite paper

In 1882, the low value stamps (up to 15c) were numerals, while the higher values featured a "Standing Helvetia". These continued in use, with a number of variations in color, perforation, and paper, until 1907. 1900 saw Switzerland's first commemorative stamps, a set of three values issued for the 25th anniversary of the Universal Postal Union, with an allegorical design featuring various symbols of communication.

=== 20th century ===
A new definitive series in 1907 showed William Tell's son holding a crossbow and an apple pierced by an arrow for values below 10c, a bust of Helvetia for 10c to 15c values, and another seated Helvetia for higher values. The William Tell's son design (by Albert Welti) went through several redrawings, including a temporary move of the bowstring in front of the crossbow's stock. From 1914 on, a portrait of William Tell himself was used for values between 10c and 30c. Also in 1914, the first of many scenic stamps were issued. The 5fr depicted the Rütli meadow, while the 3fr and 10fr stamps showed the Mythen and Jungfrau mountains, respectively.

Pro Juventute 1922 (Lucerne), 20 ct. + 5 ct.

The first semi-postal stamp was issued in 1913, but regular annual issues did not start until 1915. For many years an issue of 3-5 stamps came out on 1 December each year, until 1972.

A set of three stamps in 1919 celebrated peace at the end of World War I. Stamp printing experienced some difficulties during this period, and a variety of surcharges were needed in 1915 and 1921. The UPU was noted on its 50th anniversary in 1924 with two stamps, one depicting its building in Bern and the other the location of the 1874 Congress.

In about 1930 Switzerland began to use "grilled gum", a light grill applied along the gum to counteract the tendency for gummed stamps to curl. The grill is most obvious on mint stamps, but is faintly visible on used stamps as well. This was abandoned around 1944.

The next definitive series was a set of scenic views issued in 1934. The designs were typographed, resulting in a vigorous albeit somewhat crude-looking appearance, and they were superseded by engraved versions of the same basic designs, beginning in 1936. Several commemorative issues appeared in the 1930s, then in 1941 came new definitives honoring Swiss military heroes. Another definitive set in 1945 marked the end of the war; the higher values of this were issued in small numbers, and are relatively expensive today. The definitive series of 1949 depicted achievements of Swiss technology. Since that time, Swiss stamps have generally followed a regular pattern; an issue of about four commemoratives on a single date in the spring, and a similar group in the fall, as well as a Europa issue, usually in the spring. Starting in the 1980s, there have been additional themed issues; for instance, in 1993 an issue of four stamps featured works of art by Swiss women.

== See also ==
- Augustin Pyramus de Candolle

== Bibliography ==
=== Postal history ===
- Faulstich, Edith M. Central Post and Extra.-Courier Marks of the Helvetic Republic, 1798–1803, (with Catalog of Markings in English), Reprinted from Postal History Journal, December 1964, 16p.
- Keller, Max. Stempel aus der Stadt Bern zwischen 1803 und 1850. Erlach: Philatelistenverein Bern, 2010, 78p.
- Schäfer, Richard. Handbuch Postgeschichte von Genf: Anfänge bis 1854 = Histoire postale de Genève. Waldstetten: Just-prephilately, 2006, 276p.
- Schäfer, Richard. Das Postwesen der alten Eidgenossenschaft: Anfänge bis 1798 = Swiss postal history of the old Confederation = Histoire postale de l'ancienne Confédération. Reinach: Multipress Verlag, 2000, 418p.

=== Cantonal issues ===
- Bach, Jean-Paul and Felix Winterstein. Basler Taube. Reinach: Multipress, 1995 ISBN 3-9520837-2-0, 148p.
- Gnagi, Jakob. Die Zurcher Kantonalmarken von 1843. Bern: Organisationskomitee der NABA ZURI 84, mit Unterstutzung durch den Fonds zur Forderung der Philatelie, 1984, 113p.
- Reuterskiold, Axel de, Baron. Les timbres cantonaux de la Suisse et leurs falsifications. Lausanne: Societe Lausannoise de Timbrologie, 1898, 51p.

=== General issues ===
- Hall, Richard T. Philately of Switzerland: an introductory handbook. Asheville, N.C.: American Helvetia Philatelic Society, 2010 ISBN 0984431705, 345p.
- Hermann, Urs. Sitzende Helvetia Ungezähnt = Les Rappen (1854–1863). Wettingen: Strubel-Literatur, 2006 2 vols.
- Mirabaud, Paul and Alex de Reuterskiöld. The postage stamps of Switzerland, 1843–1862. Lawrence, MA: Quarterman Publications, 1975, 266p.
- Zinsmeister, Marian Carne. Switzerland, 1850–1958: detailed information concerning the stamps of Switzerland, when, why, and how issued. Lemont, Pa.: Society of Philatelic Americans, 1959, 80p.
- Zumstein. Katalog Schweiz/Liechtenstein, Campione und Vereinte Nationen, Genf = Catalogue Suisse/Liechtenstein, Campione et Nations Unies, Genève. Annual.

=== International organisations ===
- International Labour Office. Postage stamps and the International Labour Organisation. Genèva: International Labour Office, 1965, 15p.
- Misteli, Charles. Study on the postal stamps and cancellations of the League of Nations, the International Labor Office and their international conferences. Pasadena, CA.: United Nations Philatelists, Inc., 1995, 72p.
