= Johnson Collection =

The Johnson Collection is a collection of postcards relating mainly to the social aspects of the history of the British Post Office that forms part of the British Library Philatelic Collections. It was formed by Robert Johnson FRPSL and donated to the library in 2008.

== See also ==
- Social history
