= Landmark Trust Lundy Island Philatelic Archive =

The Landmark Trust Lundy Island Philatelic Archive was donated to the British Library by the Landmark Trust in 1991 and consists of artwork, essays, proofs and issued stamps of Lundy from 1969. The collection includes 48 handstamp postmark devices dating from 1929, when the postal service was introduced on Lundy Island and forms part of the British Library Philatelic Collections.

== See also ==
- Chinchen Collection
- Landmark Trust Archives
