= Chinchen Collection =

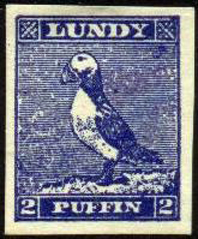
1939 Lundy puffin stamp

The Chinchen Collection is a collection of stamps, proofs, artwork and covers from Lundy Island donated by Barry Chinchen to the British Library Philatelic Collections in 1977 and is located at the British Library.

Chinchen assembled the collection during his time as the philatelic agent for the lessees of the Island, the Landmark Trust. He published "A Catalogue of Lundy Stamps" in 1969 which covered what he termed the "basic collection". Included were black-and-white photographs of cancelers (franking marks), postage stamps, over printing marks, postage labels and example forgeries. The postage labels were printed in tear-off rolls and gained the nickname "tram tickets". Detailed images to help identify stamp varieties, imperfections and forgeries were included. The catalogue was issued with a current one-page guide to non-dealer prices.

The GPO ended its presence on Lundy at the end of 1927. "King" Harman handled the mail to and from the island without charge. On 1 November 1929 he issued a series of private postage stamps, with a value expressed in "Puffins" in order to cover some of the cost of providing the service. The stamps have to be put on the bottom left hand corner of the envelope, so that the mainland sorting offices can process them. The price includes the standard Royal Mail charges for onward delivery. Puffins are a type of stamp known to philatelists as a local carriage label. Issues of increasing value were made over the years, including air mail. Many are now highly sought after by collectors and consequently are subject to forgery.

== See also ==
- List of people on stamps of Lundy
- Landmark Trust Lundy Island Philatelic Archive
- Lundy stamps
