= Muraleetharan Papers =

The Muraleetharan Papers are a collection of philatelic research documents by George Muraleetharan in eleven volumes that form part of the British Library Philatelic Collections. The papers relate to British Commonwealth postage stamps including: "...the 1935 Silver Jubilee issue, the 1937 Coronation issue, the 1947 Victory or Peace issue, 1953 Coronation issue, the Royal portraits for the issues of George V, George VI and Elizabeth II, correspondence relating to security printers, the Royal Mint Archives, De La Rue Archives, and Australian issues in the Australian Archives."
