= Mosely Collection =

British Africa philatelic collection

Cape of Good Hope, 1855-8, 4d, deep blue/white paper. Part of the British Library Mosely Collection.

The Mosely Collection of British Africa stamps dating to 1935 was formed by Dr Edward Mosely of Johannesburg, South Africa. The collection was donated to the British Museum by his daughter, Kathleen Cunningham, in 1946 and is now held as part of the British Library Philatelic Collections. After the Tapling Collection, this is considered the Library's most important philatelic acquisition due to the number of countries represented and the number of unique items included.

== Collection scope ==
The collection consists of stamps of the following countries and colonies: Ascension; the Bechuanalands; Cape of Good Hope (including Mafeking and Vryburg); Gambia; Gold Coast; Kenya, Uganda, and Tanganyika; Lagos; Mauritius; Natal; Niger Coast Protectorate (now part of Southern Nigeria); Nigeria; Northern Nigeria; Northern Rhodesia (now Zambia); Nyasaland; Orange Free State; Rhodesia; St. Helena; Seychelles; Sierra Leone; Union of South Africa; Southern Nigeria; Southern Rhodesia (now Zimbabwe); South-West Africa; Transvaal; Uganda Protectorate; Zanzibar; Zululand.

Of particular note for quality and completeness are the collections of Cape of Good Hope, Mauritius, Orange Free State, and Rhodesia. Mosely spared no efforts to try to make his collection as complete as possible, and included all known varieties, as well as essays, proofs, 'specimens', and stamps on original covers.

Highlights of the collection include:

- Ascension Island: a page of British stamps cancelled with the Ascension postmark before special stamps were introduced in 1922.
- Cape of Good Hope: Die proofs of 1d., 6d., and 1s with the rarest item being a 4d. black, one of seven known to exist.
- The Niger Coast collection has a number of proofs of the 1893 issue, some of which are unique.

The majority of the collection is unused or specimen stamps with a few used stamps.

== See also ==
- Postage stamps and postal history of the Cape of Good Hope
- Postage stamps and postal history of the Niger Coast Protectorate
- Postage stamps and postal history of Zululand
