= Postal Authority Pre-Issue Publicity Collection =

The Postal Authority Pre-Issue Publicity Collection is a collection of leaflets, press releases and other pre-issue publicity material from postal authorities for world new issues from the 1960s to 2000. It forms part of the British Library Philatelic Collections. As of January 2009, the collection was held in six stock books, 23 albums, and nine file boxes.
