= Orell Füssli =

Swiss banknote printing and bookselling company

Orell Füssli AG
- Type: Aktiengesellschaft (AG)
- Traded as: SIX: OFN
- ISIN: CH0003420806
- Industry: Printing; Publishing; Bookselling
- Founded: 1519, 1890 (AG); 1999 (Holding); 2020 (AG)
- Founder: Christoph Froschauer
- Headquarters: Dietzingerstrasse 3, 8036 Zürich, Switzerland
- Key people: Board of Directors: Dr. Thomas Moser; Dr. Martin Folini; Mirjana Blume; Dr. Luka Müller; Pascale Bruderer Management team: Daniel Link (CEO); Reto Janser (CFO); Desirée Heutschi (Head of Corporate Development); Dr. Michael Kasch (Managing Director Security Printing); Thorsten Trischler (Managing Director Zeiser)
- Operating income: ▲CHF272.8 million (2025) CHF252.5 million (2024) CHF232.2 million (2023)
- Net income: ▲CHF23 million (2025) CHF14.6 million (2023) CHF15 million (2020)
- Total equity: ▲CHF147.9 million (2025) CHF140.8 million (2024) CHF132.1 million (2023)
- Number of employees: ▲684 (2025) 659 (2024) 657 (2023)
- Divisions: Security Printing; Industrial Systems; Book Retailing; Other Business areas (incl. Publishing, Provicis)
- Website: orellfuessli.com

Orell Füssli is a Swiss banknote printing and bookselling company, established by Christoph Froschauer in 1519 as a book printer and publisher. It is currently operating in many print-related segments, such as security printing, bookselling, and publishing, with security printing being a primary contemporary product of the company. The company's shares have been traded on the SIX Swiss Exchange (SIX: OFN) since 1897. It is the oldest continuously publicly traded company in Switzerland.

== History ==
=== From Froschauer Druckerei (1519) to "Orell, Gessner, Füssli & Cie." (1770) ===
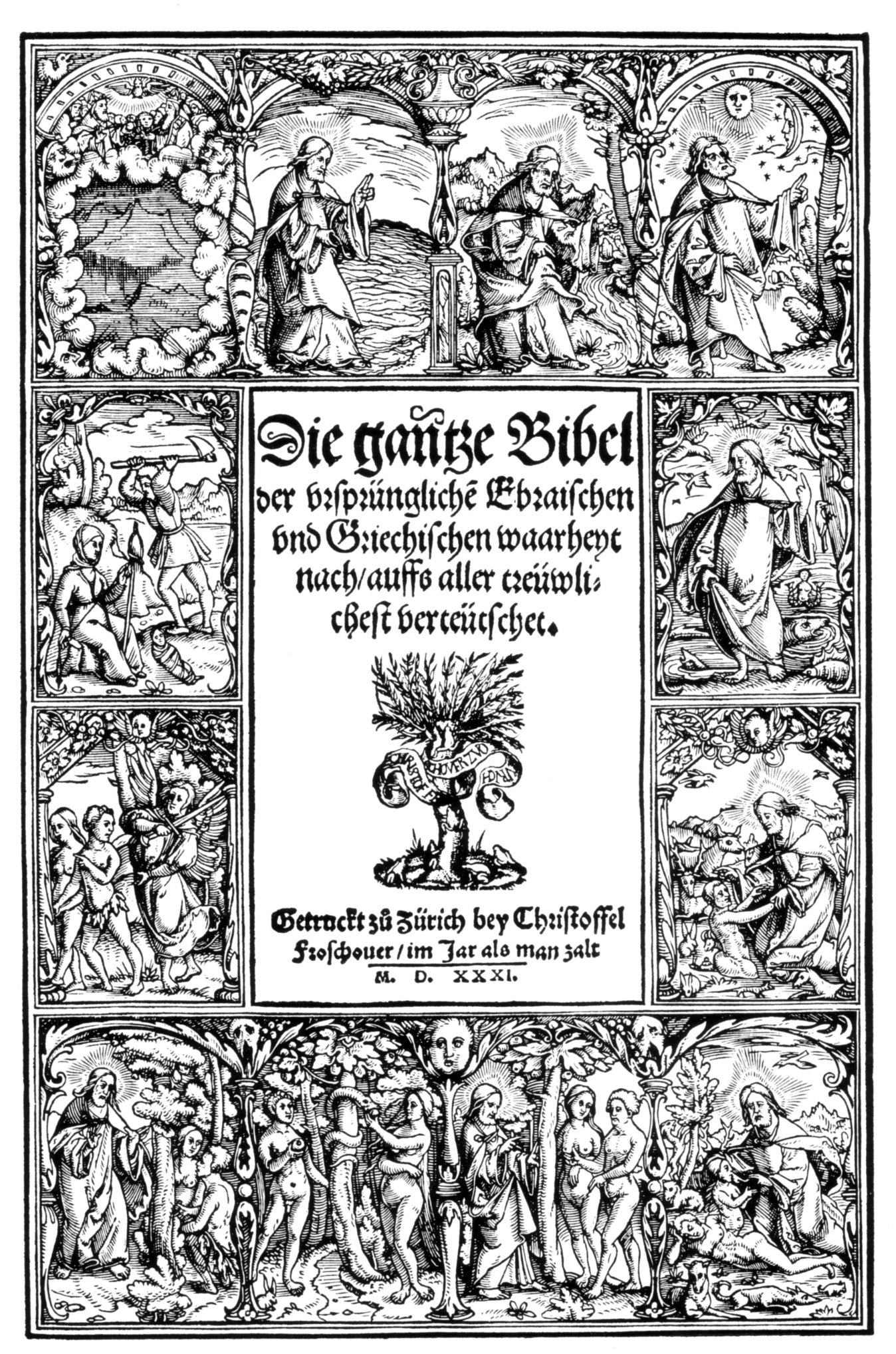
Titlepage of the Zwinglibibel of Zürich from 1531

At the beginning of the 16th century, the Imperial free city of Zürich became increasingly important as a location holding the Federal Diet of Switzerland. After the position of the Leutpriestertum (people's priest) of the Grossmünster at Zürich became vacant in late 1518, the canons of the foundation in charge of the Grossmünster elected Ulrich Zwingli to become the stipendiary priest, and on 27 December 1519, he moved permanently to Zürich, from where he subsequently initiated the Swiss Reformation.

Around the same time, book printer Christoph Froschauer relocated from Altötting in Bavaria to Zürich to be granted the rights of citizen of Zürich in 1519. The city commissioned him with the task of setting up a printing press along with further assignments that would result in the establishment and expansion of the printers. Froschauersche Druckerei received the status of a state printer and ultimately published the works of Erasmus von Rotterdam, Martin Luther, and Zwingli. Subsequently, Froschauer Druckerei expanded its product range to include historical, medical, and scientific writings.

From 1530 to 1585, the Druckerei emerged as one of the most prominent publishers in the German-speaking field, and in the years to follow, the business would change owners within the Zürich wealthy elite. Among the families involved were Escher, Wolf, Bodmer, Heidegger, and Rahn, with the Druckerei also changing its name after being acquired by one family from another.

In consequence of the progress of the Counter-Reformation in Germany, the Druckerei was to scale down its product range to offer mainly theological writings and Sittenmandate. It was not until 1744, when the Zürich Ratsherr Johann Rudolf Füssli joined the company as a partner and shifted the focus to the areas of theology, natural sciences, history, and arts. In 1766, he becomes the sole owner of the business, which from then on is referred to as "Füssli & Cie."

Hans Conrad von Orelli and his uncle Johann Jakob Bodmer run "Orell & Cie.", a publishing house with a Druckerei. The Gessner family, who also operated a Druckerei since 1670 and later a bookshop, joined "Orell & Cie." in 1761. Consequently, the business was renamed to "Orell, Gessner & Cie."

In 1770, the two businesses—"Füssli & Cie." and "Orell, Gessner & Cie."—merged to form "Orell, Gessner, Füssli & Cie."

In 1780 the company expanded its product range by entering into the newspaper business with the publication of the Zürcher Zeitung, which was to become Neue Zürcher Zeitung in 1821. Almost 90 years after its expansion, the newspaper business spun off as a separate Aktiengesellschaft in 1868.

At the end of the 18th century, it was notable for its bookshop in Zürich. It specialised in disseminating literature of the French Enlightenment by means of written orders through the publishing house Société typographique de Neuchâtel (STN), which was known to print banned books.

From 1793 to 1794, Orell Füssli published Marianne Ehrmann's Die Einsiedlerinn aus den Alpen, the first magazine published by a woman in Switzerland.

=== 19th century ===
Upon the end of the Napoleonic Wars, the appeal of Zürich as a publishing location sharply diminished. As competitive pressure increased on the market in Germany, the publishing program moved back to Swiss-related topics, and the focus of the business shifted to printing.

The evidence for the first printing of securities dates back to 1827, and the first share certificates for Escher Wyss are printed in 1839. In line with the developments of industrialisation in Switzerland, Orell Füssli becomes one of the first printers to introduce a high-speed newsprint press and would use it in the production of NZZ, which from 1843 on is published daily.

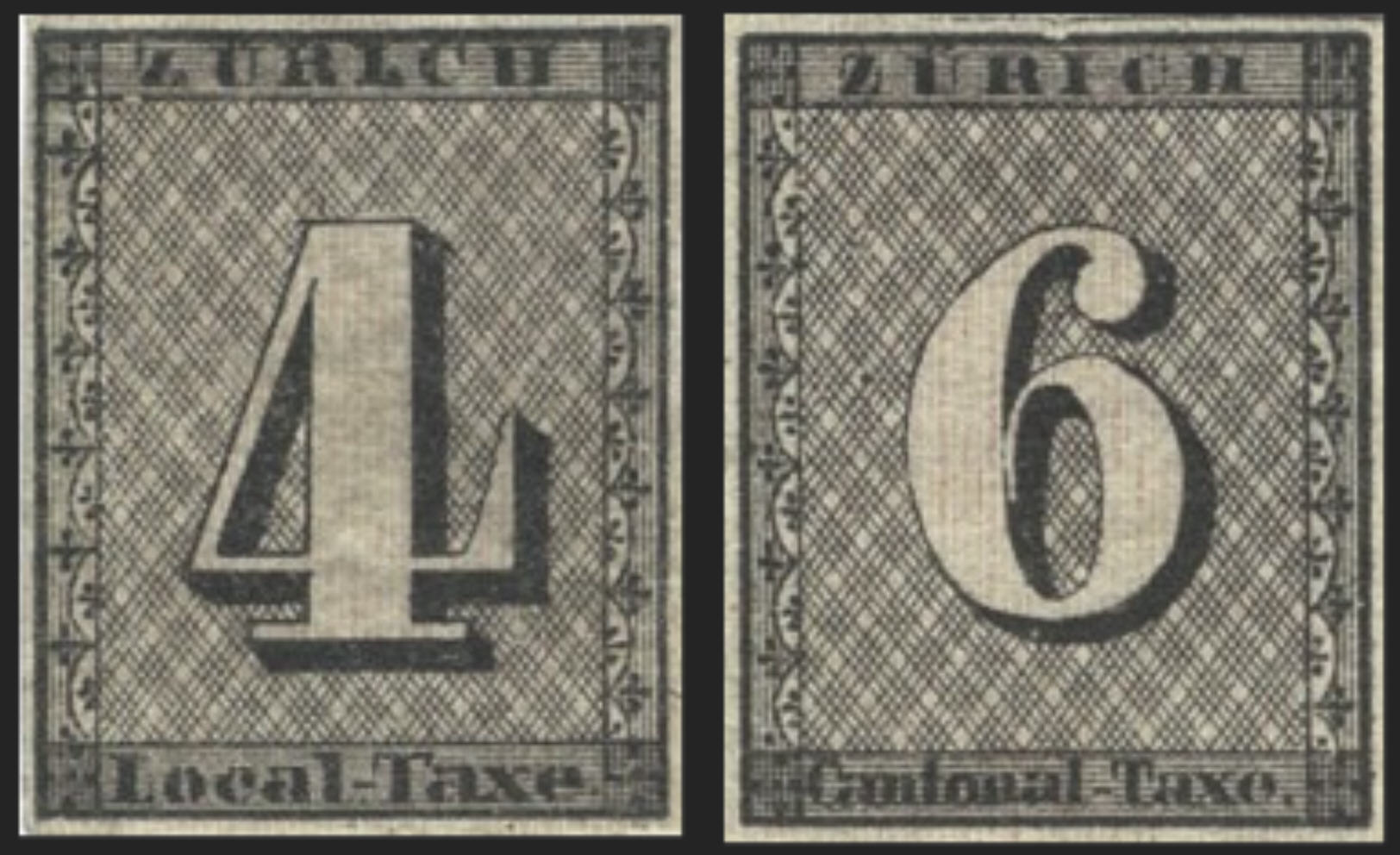
Zürich 4 and 6 (4 and 6 Rappen), Switzerland's first post stamps printed in 1843

On 1 March 1843, the canton of Zürich released the Zürich 4 and 6 printed by Orell Füssli, the first postage stamps in Switzerland and the second series worldwide, following the Penny Black issued in the UK in 1840. Upon the adoption of the Swiss Federal Constitution in 1848, the prerogative for operating postal services passed to the federal government in 1849, and the company did not further pursue this line of business.

The second half of the century provides Orell Füssli with enormous growth opportunities.

The establishment of Switzerland's first advertisement office ("Annoncenbüro") marked the beginning of Orell Füssli Werbe AG (OFA). Railway advertising starts at a large scale, requiring posters of all kinds alongside the emergence of tourist information offices that are looking for mass-printed travel brochures and timetables. Orell Füssli is able to accommodate for these demands. Upon the introduction of the 10-colour Photochrom process for colour reproductions in 1880, Orell Füssli further expanded its range of product offerings to include reproductions of all kinds and, in particular, series of maps of foreign territories. In quick succession, the company opens numerous branches on the European continent and in the USA.

On 15 February 1870, the "bank of the citizens of Zürich", Zürcher Kantonalbank, founded by the canton of Zürich, opened its first bank counter. The mandate to print banknotes is assigned to Orell Füssli, and the company begins to specialise in this field.

In 1890, the current company, Art. Institut Orell Füssli, came into existence and transitioned into a public limited company. One year earlier, the advertising agency, founded in the middle of the 19th century, had already been transformed into a public limited company, which later traded under the name Orell Füssli Werbe and was sold to Publigroupe in 1998.

The foundation of the Swiss National Bank (SNB) in 1907 signalled the introduction of a uniform currency system with banknotes throughout Switzerland. In 1909, Orell Füssli printed banknotes based on Swiss designs for the SNB on a trial basis for the first time. Individual denominations of OF were printed from the second series introduced by the SNB in 1911.

Orell Füssli moved from the city centre to the Wiedikon district, which was incorporated in 1893, in 1923 due to lack of space. The company's headquarters has been the inconspicuous building complex at Dietzingerstrasse 3, located in the immediate vicinity of the old village centre, ever since. With the move, the printing press equipment was upgraded, which led to the introduction of the inline intaglio printing process on a broad front and determined everyday printing for decades. The publishing business was given its independent market presence as Orell Füssli Verlag as early as 1925, and the name was immediately adopted as the company name in 1999 during the reorganisation and spin-off.

In 1974, the company changed its name to Orell Füssli Graphische Betriebe AG (OFGB). Around the same time, the OFGB security printing department became the sole printer for all Swiss banknotes with the design of the sixth banknote series introduced by the SNB in 1976.

The 1990s were characterised by upheaval, and a radical restructuring was carried out in 1992: the commercial printing plant was sold to Zürichsee Medien, Orell Füssli Kartographie became largely independent, and the banknote printing plant was further upgraded. The German book retailer Heinrich Hugendubel (Buchhandlung zum Elsässer) founded Orell Füssli Buchhandlungs AG as a minority shareholder. This transaction effectively created the present-day company in terms of its portfolio (publishing, book retailing, security printing).

Orell Füssli Buchhandlungs AG (51% OF, 49% Elsässer) moved into the prestigious Kramhof property at Füsslistrasse 4 and opened Switzerland's largest bookshop there in 1993, which has been associated with the name Orell Füssli in Zurich ever since and is often confused with the company's headquarters. In 1996, the revival of book retailing under the OF name led to the launch of online book retailing under the domain books.ch.

Orell Füssli Werbe was spun off as early as 1889 and taken over in 1998 by Lausanne-based Publigroupe, which merged the assets with its own companies, such as Publicis, thus removing the names OFA and Orell Füssli from the advertising market. A new group structure was created as part of a further reorganisation in 1999. Orell Füssli Graphische Betriebe Ltd. became Orell Füssli Holding Ltd., and the core operations of Graphische Betriebe—publishing (OFV) and security printing (OFS)—were spun off into independent subsidiaries under the holding company umbrella.

Orell Füssli acquired Teledata Ltd in its entirety in 2001 and renamed it Orell Füssli Wirtschaftsinformationen Ltd in 2003. On 1 July 2008, Orell Füssli Wirtschaftsinformationen Ltd. was wholly acquired by the Axon Active Ltd. group based in Lucerne. However, the name Orell Füssli Wirtschaftsinformationen AG was retained. The risk management solutions provider CRIF acquired the company in 2014.

In July 2002 Orell Füssli acquired a 76% majority interest in the Atlantic Zeiser Group Ltd, which is based in Emmingen-Liptingen (Germany) and had subsidiaries in France, Italy, Spain, the UK, and the USA. The acquisition expanded the company's repertoire and allowed it to market its expertise globally. The company's complete takeover was finalised at the beginning of November 2005.

Atlantic Zeiser Group AG was active in the telephone and credit card business, as well as passport systems and numbering boxes. With the advent of mobile phones and the decline of telephone cards, Atlantic Zeiser Group AG entered an economic crisis. In 2018, the card business was sold to Coesia (IT), while the business with components for the security printing industry remained with Orell Füssli Holding as Zeiser.

In 2020, Orell Füssli Holding merged with its subsidiaries Orell Füssli Security Printing Ltd and Orell Füssli Dienstleistungs Ltd and has since traded as Orell Füssli Ltd.

In 2020, Orell Füssli Ltd acquired a stake in the technology company Procivis, followed by the majority takeover in 2021.

In 2022, Orell Füssli Ltd acquired hep Verlag AG, a Swiss publisher of textbooks and reference books based in Berne.

In 2025, Orell Füssli AG acquired SKV AG, a leading Swiss provider of learning media for commercial and business education, from the Swiss Commercial Association.
