= Board of Inland Revenue Stamping Department Archive =

The Board of Inland Revenue Stamping Department Archive in the British Library contains artefacts from 1710 onwards, and has come into existence through amendments in United Kingdom legislation.

This collection is a key resource for researchers interested in Great Britain and some Commonwealth countries postal and revenue philately and particularly impressed duty stamps.

== Selected rare items ==
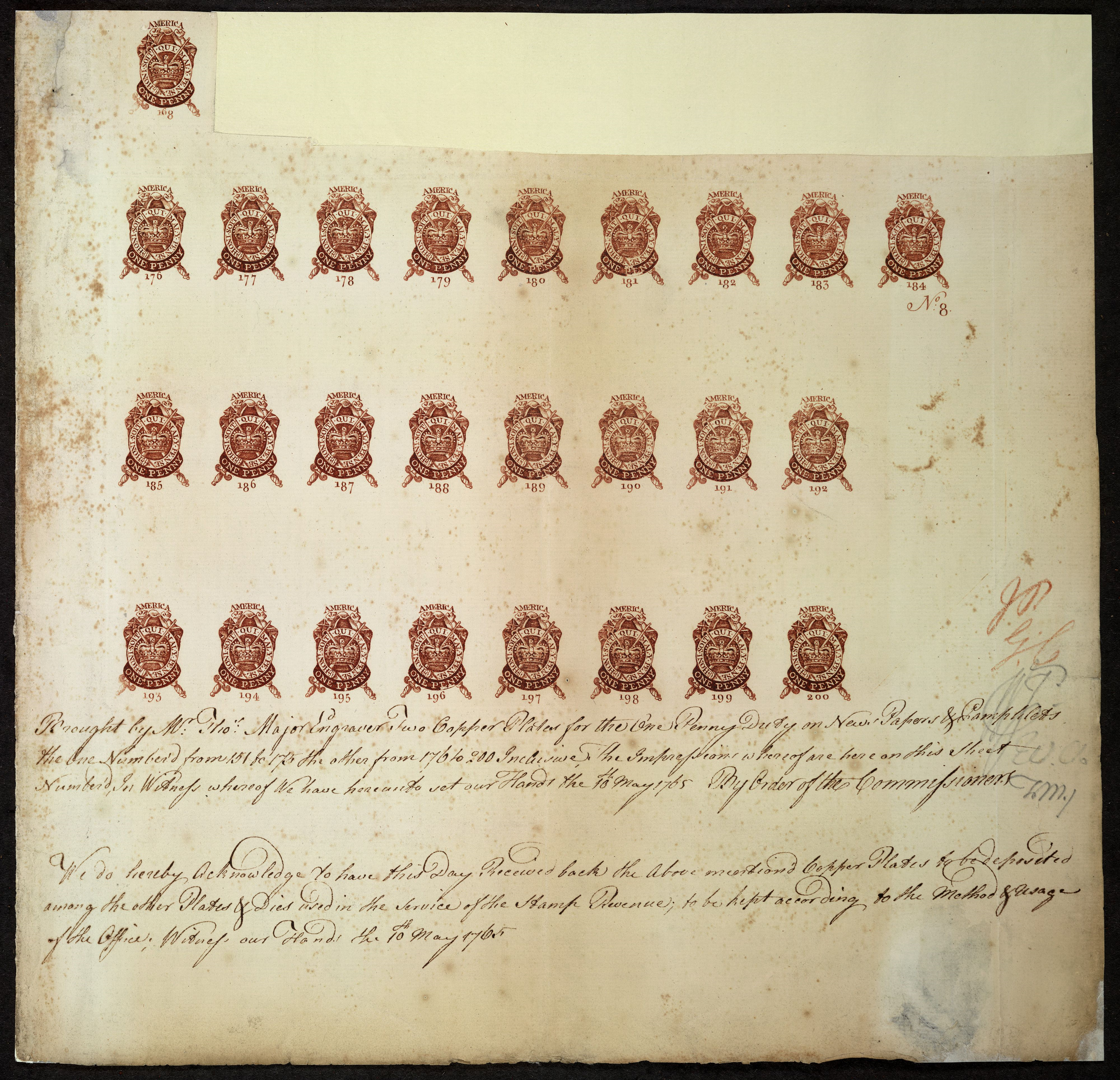
Proof sheet of one-penny stamps submitted for approval to Commissioners of Stamps by engraver. 10 May 1765.

The archive includes a unique proof sheet of 26 Revenue 1765 Newspaper and Pamphlet one penny impressions showing the registration certificate. These were issued to apply the Stamp Act 1765 intended to raise taxes to fund the defence of the American Colonies. The tax applied to legal documents, licenses, newspapers, pamphlets and almanacs in the American Colonies, Quebec, Nova Scotia, Newfoundland, Florida, the Bahamas and the West Indian Islands. The taxes resulted in public protest and rioting. The tax was abandoned after a few months due to its unpopularity but the political damage contributed to the War of Independence in 1775. 32 copies of the original dark-red proof impressions made in 1765 have survived worldwide and 26 are on this sheet. Five are in private hands and one is in the Smithsonian National Postal Museum's permanent collection.

== History ==
Under the Inland Revenue Board Act 1849 (12 & 13 Vict. c. 1) the control of revenue stamps transferred from the Excise Department to the Stamp Department at Somerset House. Proofs and specimens of stamps from 1710 were also deposited. The Stamping Department produced revenue and fee stamps until 1934 when responsibility was transferred to the Stationery Office.

Until 1914, stamping of legal documents and production of postage and revenue stamps had been by the Inland Revenue, and by managed external contractors. Under The Inland Revenue and Post Office (Powers and Duties) Order, 1914, responsibility for the manufacture of postage stamps passed to the General Post Office, with some production at Somerset House until 1934. During that period imprimatur sheets of stamps were kept by the Inland Revenue and the Post Office, and earlier examples from 1840-1914 was passed to the GPO Archives (now Royal Mail, Heritage Services). Reference collections of these stamps were maintained and are virtually complete.

== Scope ==
The archive has over 400,000 items and is more easily understood by being sub-divided into various collections:

- The earliest, and one of the most extensive set of registers of dies and stamps used by the Stamp Revenue dating from 1710-1849 contained in some 28 volumes.
- Registers of dies and stamps intended for use by the Stamp Revenue in America and the West Indies from 1765-66.
- A mixed collection of postage and revenue stamps, dating from 1849-1884 held in 7 volumes.
- The inspectors’ Specimen Books of impressed revenue and postage stamps for the period 1885-1964 in 10 volumes.
- The Registers of impressed revenue stamps and dies from 1916-1964 contained in 7 volumes, and the Secretary’s Specimen Book of Irish Dies.
- Proofs and specimens of Ace of Spades, Almanack, Hat Tax, Home Duty, Medicine, Newspaper, Pamphlet and Playing Card stamps and wrappers, in some 26 albums.
- A large number of registration sheets, in guard books, of postage and revenue stamps dating from 1914-1934. Some of these sheets were overprinted for use in overseas territories such as Bechuanaland, Eire, Hong Kong, Levant, Morocco and Nauru. There are also some sheets of stamps for use in the Palestine Mandate. In addition this group contains sheets of Postage Due Labels, Income Tax, Entertainment Tax, Unemployment Insurance, Health and Pensions, Company Registration, Coffee and Table Water Duty. There are also sections relating to Currency Notes, Savings stamps, Playing card wrappers and sugar coupons.
- Further albums containing stamps overprinted ‘CANCELLED’ or ‘SPECIMEN’, and includes Civil Service, Bankruptcy, Estate Duty, Foreign Bills, Judicature and Land Registry stamps.
- British stamps, housed in four albums, overprinted for official use by the Board of Education, Office of Works, Inland Revenue and the Royal Household, may include ‘SPECIMEN’ overprinted items.
- A selection of copper electros, dies and punches of British postage and revenue stamps.
- Several albums of proofs and colour trials of Queen Victoria and King Edward VII postage stamps.
- An album containing postcards, envelopes, printed wrappers and telegram forms for Great Britain, India and several of the Crown Colonies.
- A very large accumulation of stamps on cards, in payment of income tax, postage and revenue overprints, Coffee Excise labels, National War Savings stamps, sugar coupons, tobacco labels, Birmingham Corporation Savings Bank and essays for National Health Insurance stamps.
- A collection of die and plate proofs, essays, and imprimatur sheets relating to the Match Tax.
- A collection of Indian postage and revenue stamps, with various Indian dies and plates.
- A group of nine albums containing Indian fiscal stamps, Bonded Salt Boat notes, Court Fees, Hundi paper, promissory notes and sundry other duties. Also, copper dies and punches, and proofs and colour trials of stamps for Ceylon, India, Jamaica and Mauritius.
- Great Britain currency notes, incorporating uncut sheets of 25 in denominations up to £1.

== See also ==
- British Library Philatelic Collections
- Impressed duty stamp
- Revenue Society
