= Bob Schoolley-West =

Robin "Bob" F. Schoolley-West (born 12 December 1937, Brighton, died 14 July 2012, Dartford, Kent) was a former Head of the Philatelic Collections at the British Library (originally part of the British Museum).

He joined the Museum in 1973 after he investigated, as a police officer, the theft of items from the philatelic collections by James Mackay. In the mid-1980s he took an active part in tracking down forgeries of classic stamps made by Pro-Phila Forum in Germany based on photographs taken by a visitor to the Library.

Schoolley-West retired in 1991 and was succeeded at the British Library by his former assistant, David Beech.

== Publications ==
- Stamps, British Library, London, 1987. ISBN 0712301275
- The Care and Preservation of Philatelic Materials, British Library, London, 1989. (With T.J. Collings) ISBN 0712301364
