= Jamaica 1956–58 £1 chocolate and violet =

Unissued Jamaican postage stamp series

1956–58 £1 chocolate and violet
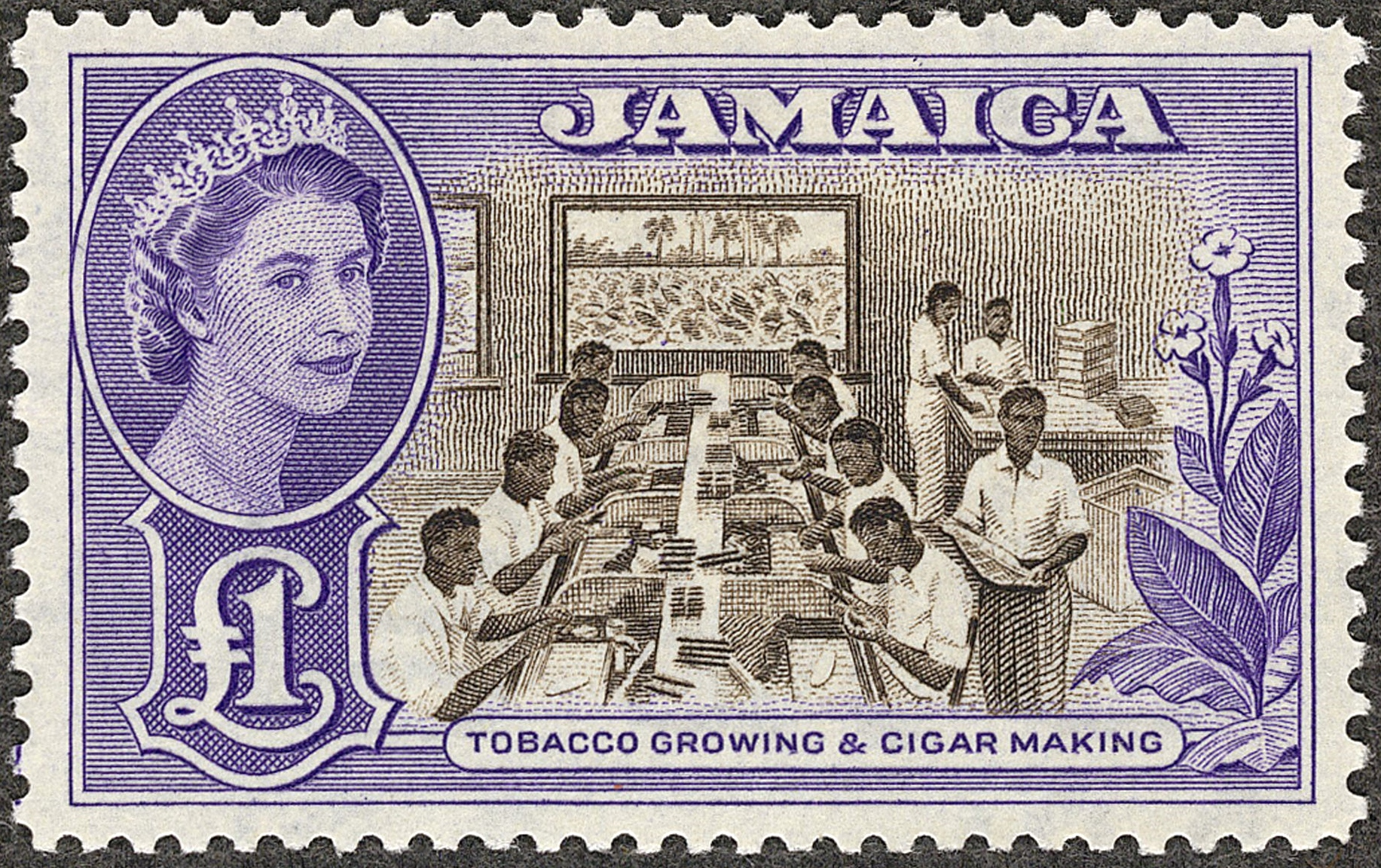
- Country of production: UK
- Location of production: Waterlow & Sons Ltd., London
- Date of production: 1956
- Nature of rarity: Unissued
- No. in existence: 7
- Face value: one pound

The Jamaica 1956–58 £1 chocolate and violet was a planned, but unissued, Jamaican postage stamp. The stamp's design was identical to the King George VI stamp, issued in 1949, which depicted a scene of workers rolling cigars by hand, but with the vignette image of King George VI replaced with that of Queen Elizabeth II. Although the stamp was abandoned after printing and not issued, there are seven copies in existence. It was replaced by a £1 stamp depicting Jamaica's coat of arms.

== See also ==
- British Library Philatelic Collections
- Postage stamps and postal history of Jamaica
