= Thomas Image =

Thomas Image (1772–1856) was a geologist and collector of fossil specimens.

Image, born in 1772, was son of John Image, vicar of Peterborough, and rector of Elton, Northamptonshire. He was educated at Corpus Christi College, Cambridge, and graduated B.A. 1795 and M.A. 1798. In 1798 he presented himself to the rectory of Whepstead, near Bury St. Edmund's, and in 1807 he became also rector of Stanningfield.

Image was a very diligent collector of fossils, and the specimens in the museum at Whepstead fully illustrated the geology of the eastern counties (cf. Clark and Hughes, Life of Sedgwick. ii. 320–2). In 1840 he was elected F.G.S. In 1856, owing to the exertions of Sedgwick, the fossils were bought by the university of Cambridge; they are now in the Woodwardian Museum. Image died at Whepstead rectory 8 March 1856. After his death his collection of minerals was sold by auction.

He had married Frances Freeman. His son was William Edmund Image, the philatelist.
