= Impressed duty stamp =

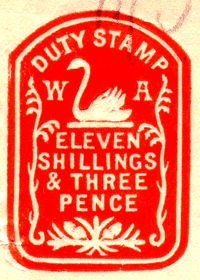
An impressed duty stamp of Western Australia for eleven shillings and three pence, c. 1907

An impressed duty stamp is a form of revenue stamp created by impressing (embossing) a stamp onto a document using a metal die to show that the required duty (tax) had been paid. The stamps have been used to collect a wide variety of taxes and duties, including stamp duty and duties on alcohol, financial transactions, receipts, cheques and court fees. Usage has been worldwide but particularly heavy in the United Kingdom and British Commonwealth.

Impressed duty stamps are to be distinguished from adhesive revenue stamps which are applied to documents in the same way that a postage stamp is applied to a letter.

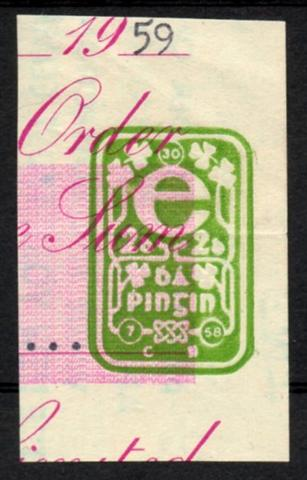
An Irish 1959 Impressed Duty Stamp on part of a cheque

== History in the United Kingdom ==
In the United Kingdom, the first impressed duty stamps were used following the introduction of stamp duty in the Stamps Act 1694, An act for granting to Their Majesties several duties on Vellum, Parchment and Paper for 10 years, towards carrying on the war against France (5 & 6 Will. & Mar. c. 21). The duty ranged from 1 penny to several shillings on a number of different legal documents including insurance policies and documents used as evidence in courts. It raised around £50,000 a year and although it was initially a temporary measure, it proved so successful that its use was continued.

Successive Acts have created new duties up to the present day and impressed duty stamps have been used until recently to collect the taxes with electronic methods now taking over.

The tax was enforced by making the documents unenforceable in court if they had not been properly stamped. The tax was either a fixed amount per document or ad valorem where the tax varied according to the value of the transaction being taxed.

The first stamps were issued by the newly created Board of Commissioners of Stamps. Distributors of the stamps were appointed throughout the country. Later, the poet William Wordsworth was the distributor in Westmorland. The stamps were embossed onto the document directly, at first without any inking (known as albino), and later using colour. In the case of parchment the stamp was first applied to paper which was attached to the document using glue and a tin metal strip.

== Adoption worldwide ==
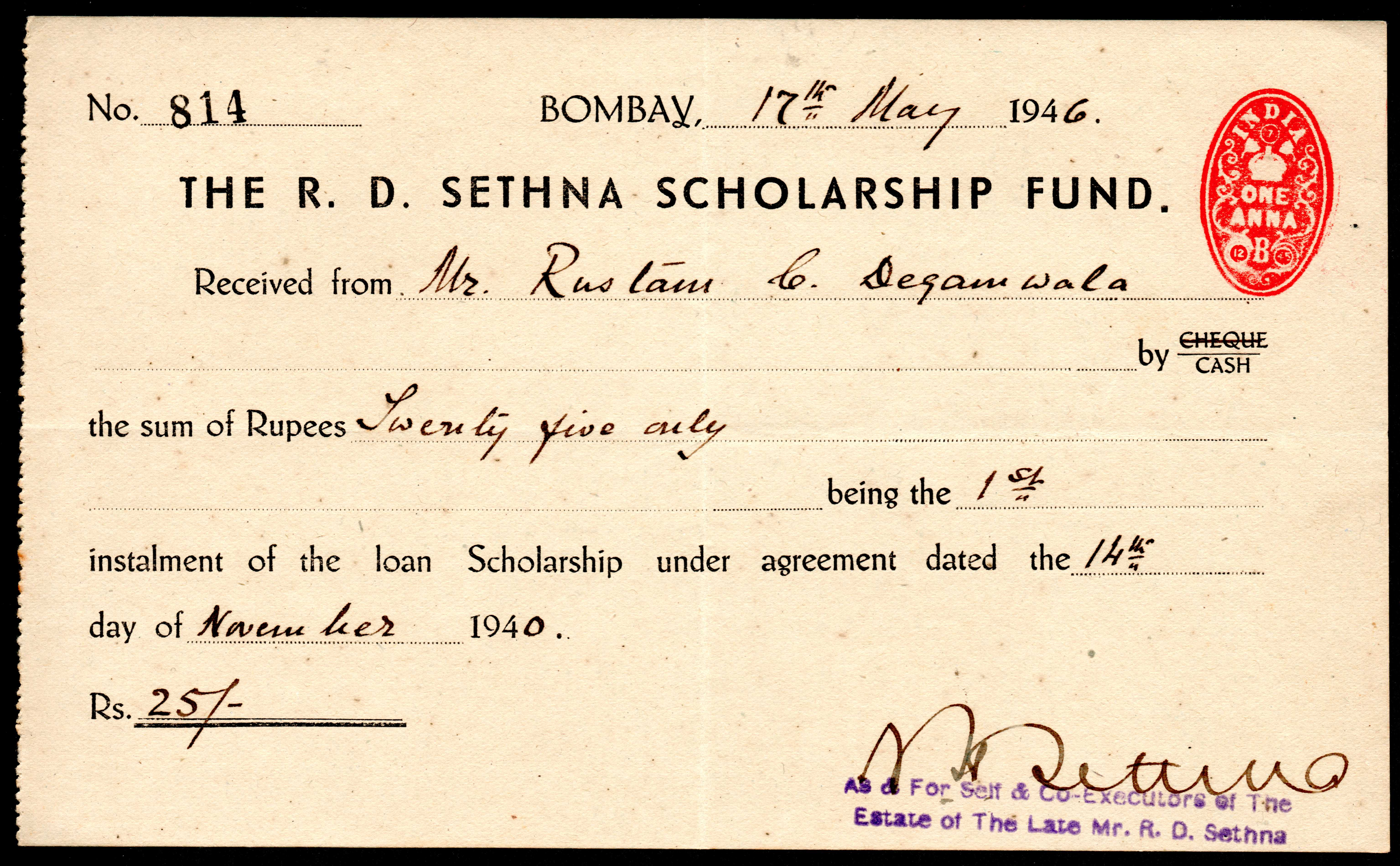
A 1946 India receipt bearing an impressed duty stamp

The use of the stamps in the United Kingdom was so successful that the same model was soon adopted in the rest of British Empire. The stamps have also been used in many other countries.

== Revenue meters ==
In many countries, revenue meters have replaced impressed stamps as they are more efficient and the stamp is quicker to apply. Operating like a meter franking machine, they are manufactured by many of the same companies, for instance Pitney Bowes and Neopost.

== Over-embossing dies ==
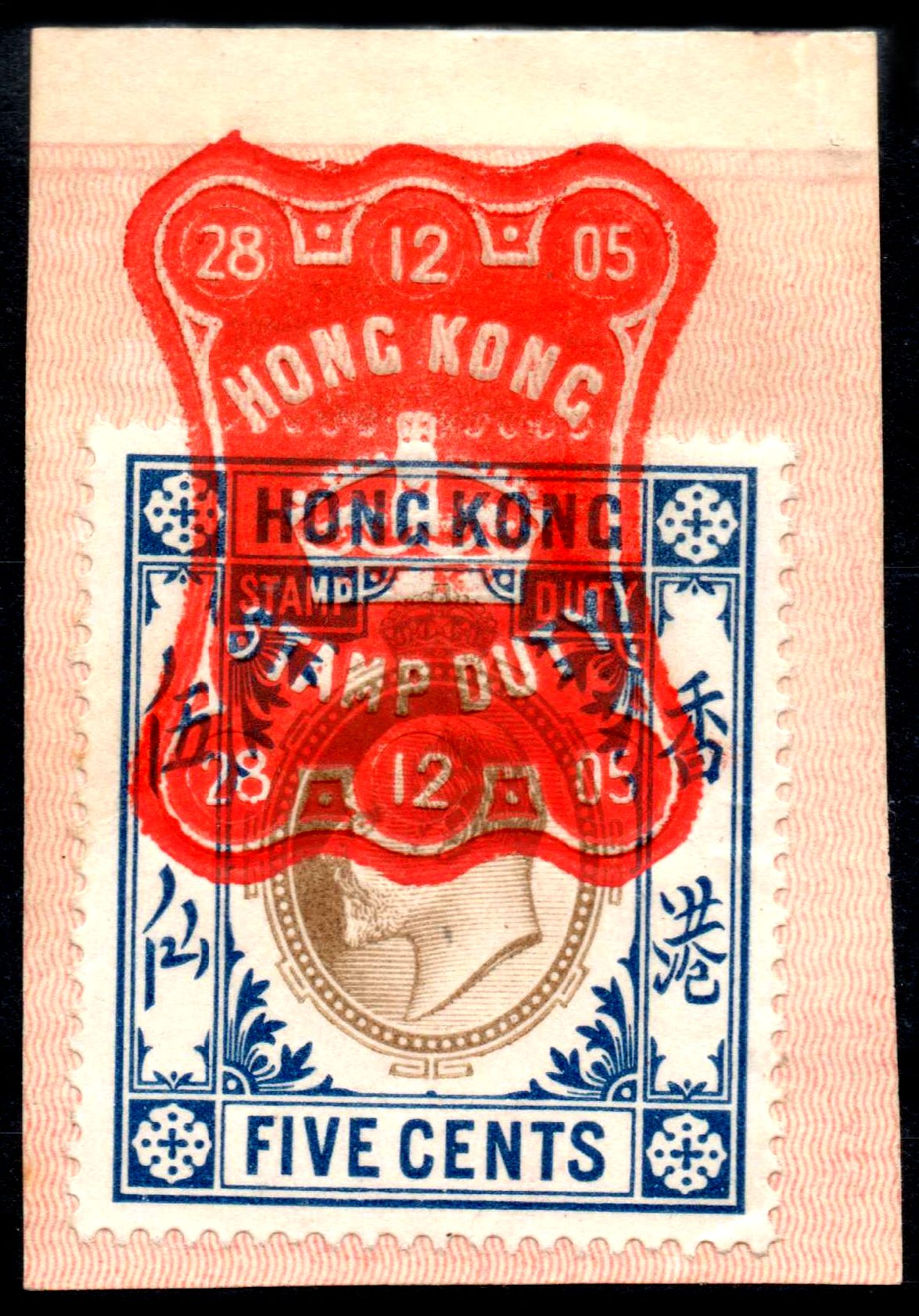
A 28 December 1905 over-embossing mark in red on a Hong Kong 5c stamp duty revenue stamp

Over-embossing dies may be confused with impressed duty stamps as they appear similar. In fact, they are applied to adhesive revenue stamps to cancel the stamp and tie the stamp to the document on which it is placed. Often in red, they will usually include the date on the top and bottom of the die and are produced using the same method as impressed duty stamps. They normally show no value as they are not stamps but in a few cases over-embossing dies have been adapted to include a value and to serve as stamps, for instance in Penang, Singapore and Malacca. In 1901, De La Rue produced a short Report upon Stamping of Documents that explained the advantages and disadvantages of the different methods of stamping and included a sample over-embossing on an Imperium stamp.

== Pre-printed revenue stamps ==
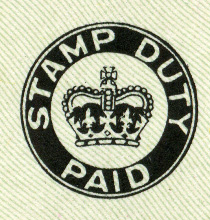
The "Stamp Duty Paid" mark that appeared on British cheques from 1956 to 1971 when the tax on cheques was cancelled

A pre-printed revenue stamp is a type of revenue stamp where the stamp is incorporated into the design of the document and printed at the same time as the rest of the document. They are distinct from impressed duty stamps in being neither impressed nor embossed. Pre-printed revenue stamps were often included in the design of cheques to prevent the need to separately stamp each cheque. They are also found incorporated into the design of stock certificates and are analogous to imprinted stamps in the postal field without the embossing sometimes found there. They also have similarities to stamped paper, but unlike stamped paper, where the stamp is usually large and the rest of the paper blank, the pre-printed revenue stamp is normally only a small part of the document, perhaps appearing in a corner, and often no larger than a typical postage stamp.

In the United Kingdom, a pre-printed stamp, without a stated value, appeared on cheques from 1956 bearing the words "Stamp Duty Paid" that prevented the need for each cheque to be separately embossed with a stamp as had previously been the case.

== See also ==
- Board of Inland Revenue Stamping Department Archive
- Stamp Act
- Stamped paper
