= British Library Philatelic Department Photograph Collection =

The British Library Philatelic Department Photograph Collection is a collection of photographs of philatelic material not in the British Library Philatelic Collections. Mostly composed of material donated by philatelic auctioneers, the collection is an important resource for researchers.
