= Tapling Collection =

Collection of postage stamps

Tapling collection
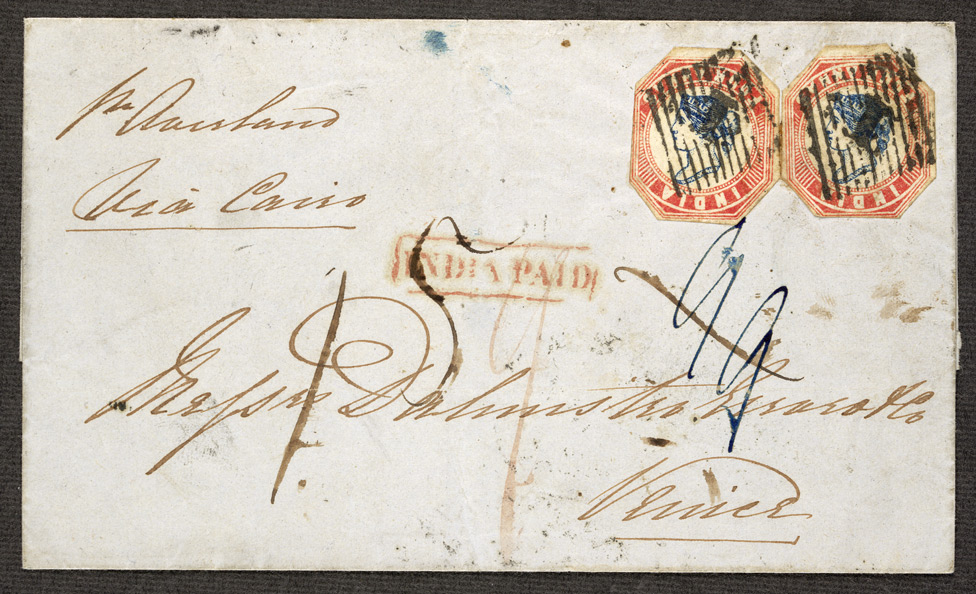
- The Tapling Collection includes this 1854, 4 annas stamp in blue and pale red from India with the error of having the head inverted.
- Housed at: British Library
- Curators: Richard Scott Morel

The Tapling Collection of postage stamps was donated to the British Museum from the estate of Thomas Tapling in 1891.

The probate value of the Tapling collection was set at £12,000 but on arrival Richard Garnett (assistant keeper of Printed Books) estimated their value at more than £50,000 and described the bequest as the most valuable gift since the Grenville Library in 1847 (equivalent to £24,000,000 in 2011).

It is held in the Philatelic Collections of the British Library and selected items are on permanent public exhibition.

The collection covers the period 1840 to 1890 with some items up to 1900 added subsequently and recorded on the album pages. As of January 2009 the stamps were held in 72 boxes and the postal stationery part held in 113 albums and seven boxes.

== Highlights ==
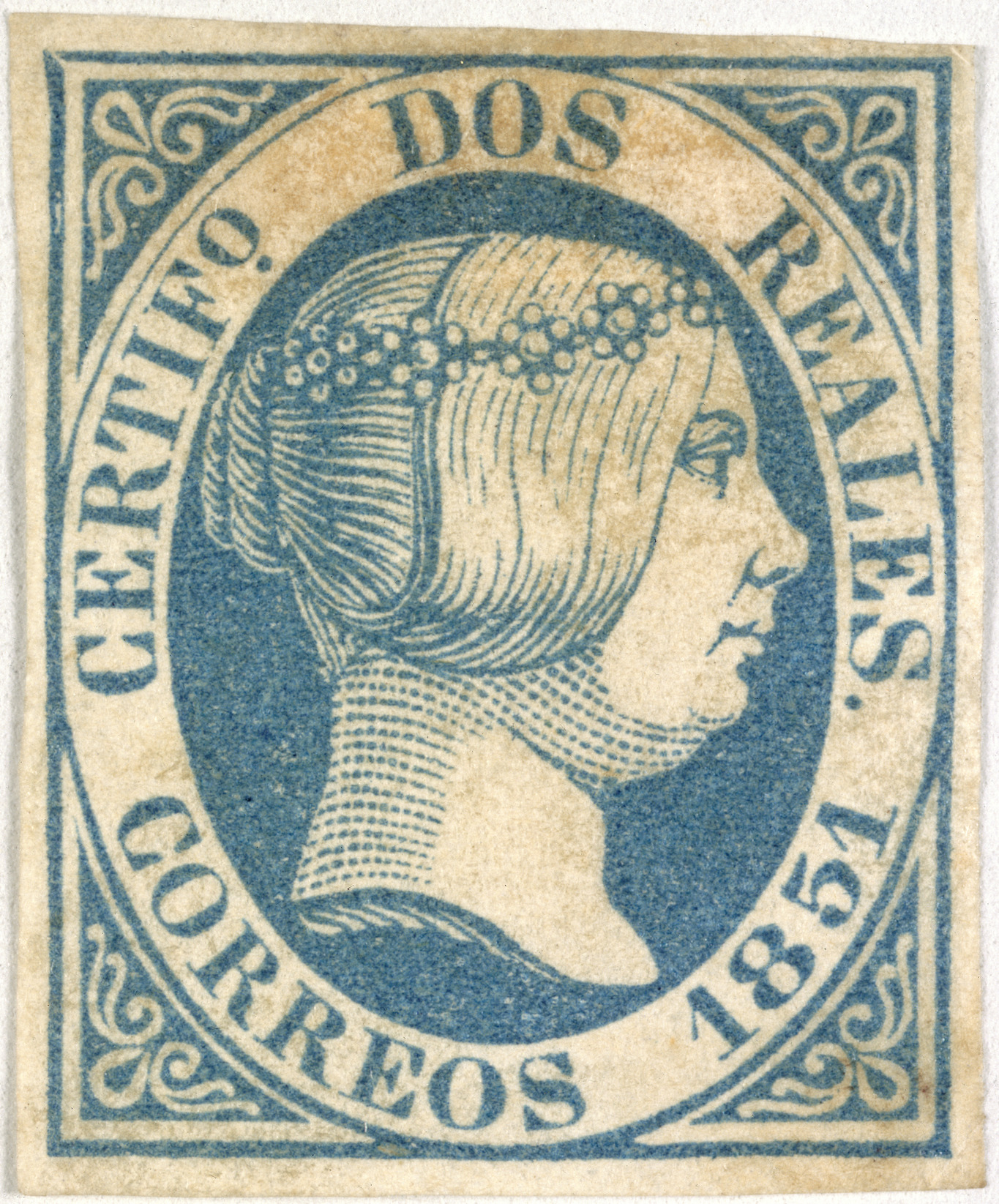
Queen Isabella II (2 reales stamp with colour error) - The Tapling Collection (1851) - BL

The collection features these rarities:

- Gold Coast: 1883 (May) 1d on 4d magenta, unique
- Great Britain: 1858-79 1d red, plate 77, one of a few known
- Hawaii: 1851-52 2 cents to 13 cents (both types), the "Missionaries"
- India: 1854 4 annas blue and pale red, error head inverted, two used on a cover, unique
- Mauritius: 1847 1d red used on cover and 2d blue, the "Post Office" issue
- Spain: 1851 2 reales, error of colour, one of three known
- Switzerland: Zürich: 1843 4 rappen, the unique unsevered horizontal strip of five
- Uruguay: 1858 120 centavos blue and 180 centavos green, in tête beche pairs, two of five known
- Western Australia: 1854-55 4d blue, error frame inverted

The collection also includes a significant number of colour varieties of early United States postal issues.

== See also ==
- British Library Philatelic Collections
- List of postage stamps

== References and sources ==
Sources

- Mackay, James A. (1964), The Tapling Collection of postage and telegraph stamps and postal stationery, British Museum
- Melville, Frederick J. (1905), The Tapling Collection of Stamps and Postal Stationery at the British Museum. A descriptive guide and index, Lawn & Barlow
- Index to the collection of postage and other stamps bequeathed to the British Museum by Thomas Keay Tapling, M.P., Trustees of the British Museum, 1903
- Harris, Philip Rowland (1998), A history of the British Museum Library, 1753-1973, British Library, ISBN 978-0-7123-4562-0
