= Inverted Swan =

1855 Australian stamp with invert error

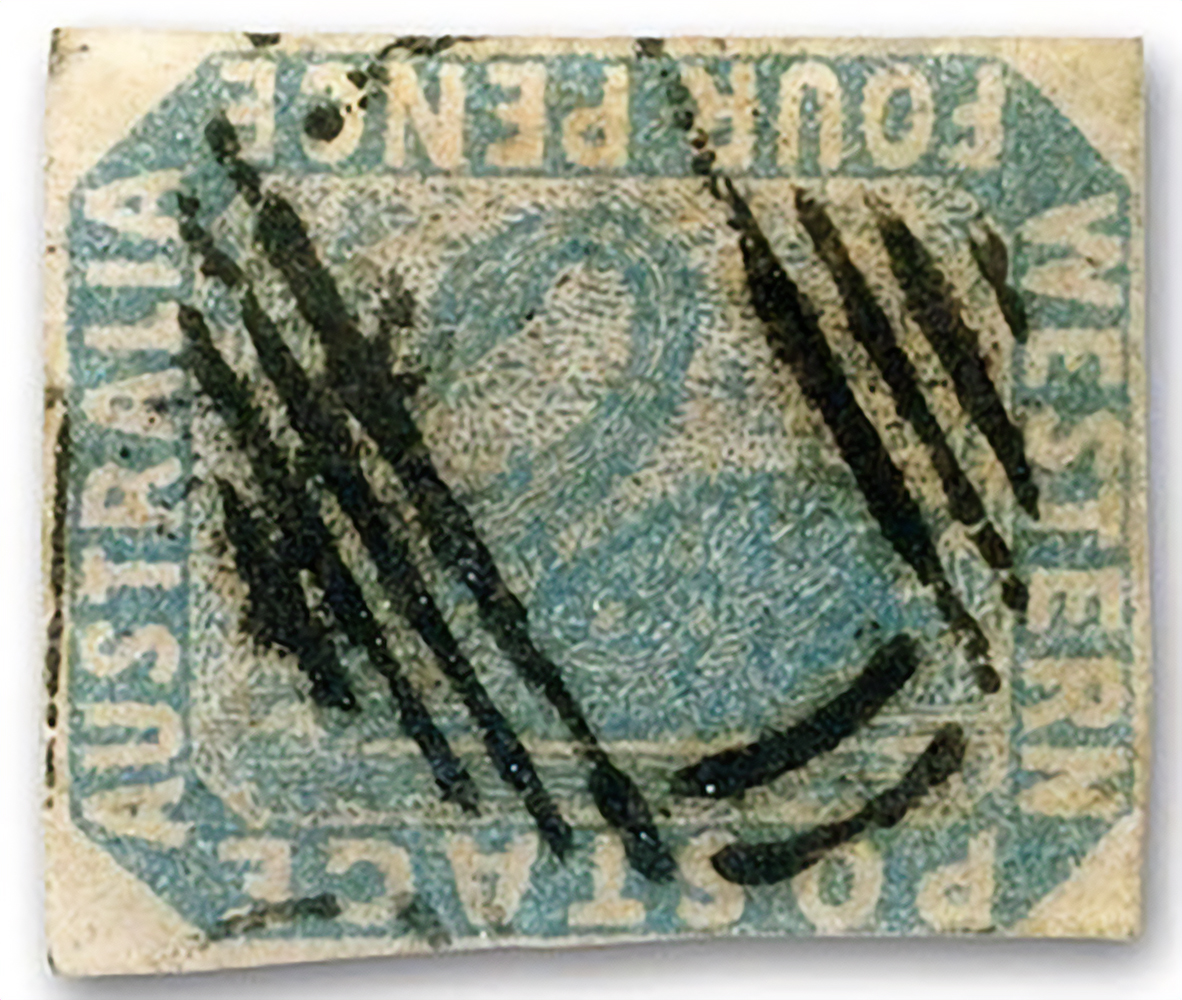
- Country of production: Western Australia
- Location of production: Perth
- Date of production: January 1855
- Nature of rarity: Invert error
- No. in existence: 15 + a partial
- Face value: 4-pence
- Estimated value: US$37,500 – US$80,000

The Inverted Swan, a 4-pence blue postage stamp issued in 1855 by Western Australia, was one of the world's first invert errors. Technically, it is the frame that is inverted, not the image of the swan, but it has become commonly known as the Inverted Swan.

In 1854, Western Australia issued its first stamps, featuring the colony's symbol, the black swan, as did all WA stamps until 1902. While the 1d black was engraved in Great Britain by Perkins Bacon, other values, including the 4d blue, were produced by Horace Samson in Perth using lithography, and with different frames around the swan design for each value.

== The error ==
In January 1855, additional 4d stamps were needed. When Alfred Hillman brought the printing stone out of storage, he found that two of the impressions had been damaged, so he had to redo them. One of the replaced frames was tilted; the other was accidentally redone upside-down. The stone's block of 60 was transferred four times to make the printing stone, and 97 sheets were printed before Hillman discovered the mistake and corrected it, resulting in a total of 388 errors being printed.

However, the errors went unrecognised and unreported for several years. Only 15 complete copies, plus a part of a stamp in a strip of three, have survived. No unused copies are known.

One example was discovered in Ireland in the 1860s, acquired by the Duke of Leinster, and bequeathed to Ireland in 1897. It is on display at a museum in Dublin. It was on displayed in 1890 at Royal Philatelic Society London's first philatelic exhibition. Other examples are in the Royal Collection, the Tapling Collection of the British Museum, at the State Library of New SOuth Wales and at museums in Sydney, and Perth, in addition to private collections.

In 1927 the locations of the nine known copies were listed in the Brisbane Telegraph. 1 – Collection of the Royal Family of Windsor. 2- Tapling collection, British Museum. 3 – Leinster collection, Dublin Science and Art Museum. 4 – White collection, State Library of New South Wales. 5 – EH Collins. 6 – PR England. 7 – Dr HA James. 8 – JA Nix. 9 – L Meinertzhagen

Copies of this stamp have been sold over the years such as, a 1980 auction realisation US$80,000, for $37,500 in 1983 and for £122,400 in a Spink auction on 19 May 2015.

== See also ==
- List of notable postage stamps

== Sources ==
- Philatelic Gems 1. Amos Press, 1989.

== External Sources ==
- The Inverted Swan, used Four Pence stamp, Western Australia, 1855, State Library of New South Wales, S.G.4a. ( 1 )
