= Zurich 4 and 6 =

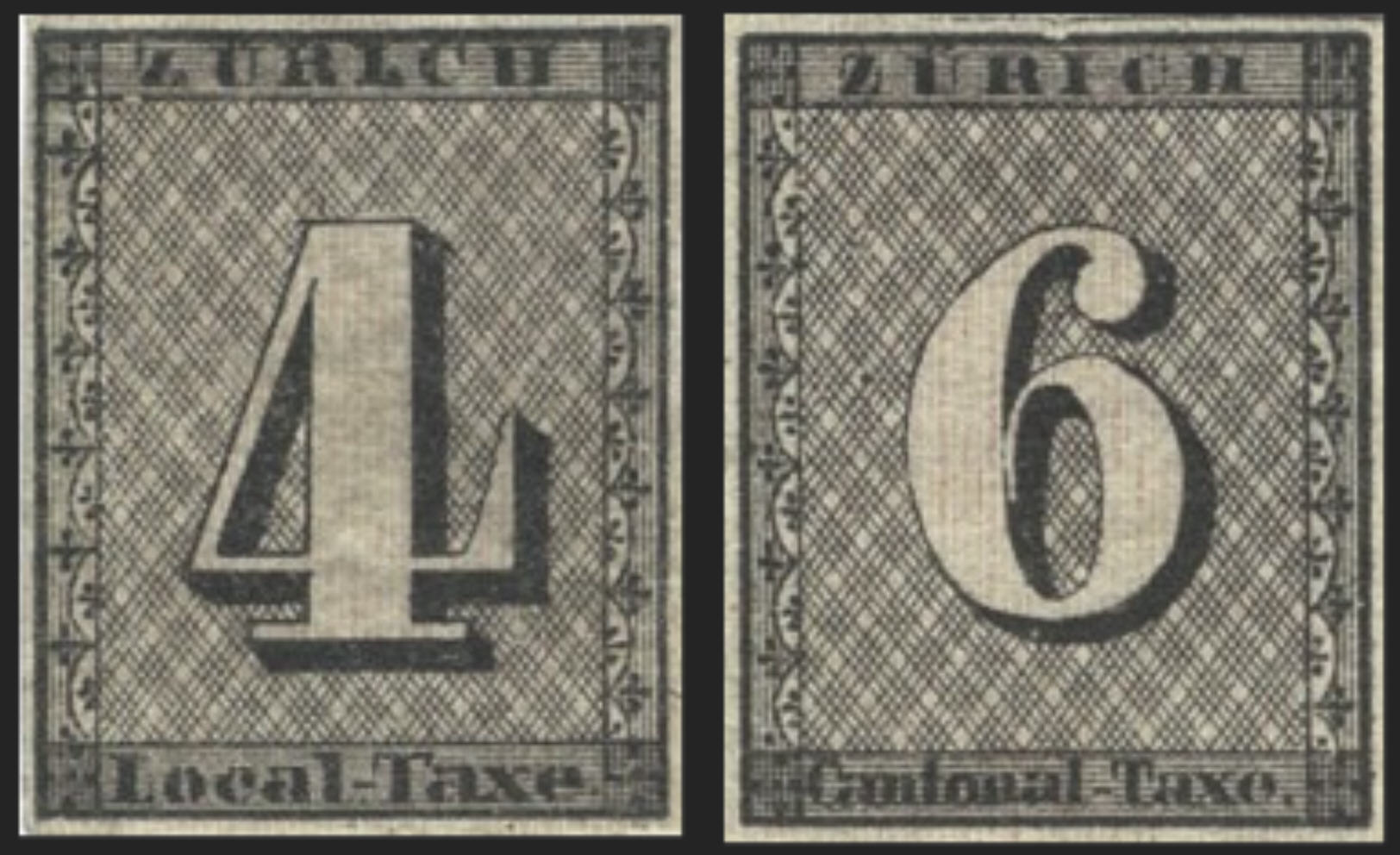
- Country of production: Switzerland
- Location of production: Zurich
- Date of production: 1 March 1843
- Nature of rarity: Extremely rare
- No. in existence: Unknown
- Face value: 4 and 6 rappen
- Estimated value: CHF 48,000 and above

The Zurich 4 and 6 were the first postage stamps issued in continental Europe, on 1 March 1843. Both were inscribed "Zurich" at the top.

The 4-rappen stamp was also inscribed "Local-Taxe" at the bottom, since it was intended to pay for letters mailed within the city, while the 6-rappen, inscribed "Cantonal-Taxe", was for use on letters going anywhere in the canton.

== See also ==
- Postage stamps and postal history of Switzerland
- List of postage stamps
