= British Library Philatelic Collections =

Collection within the British Library

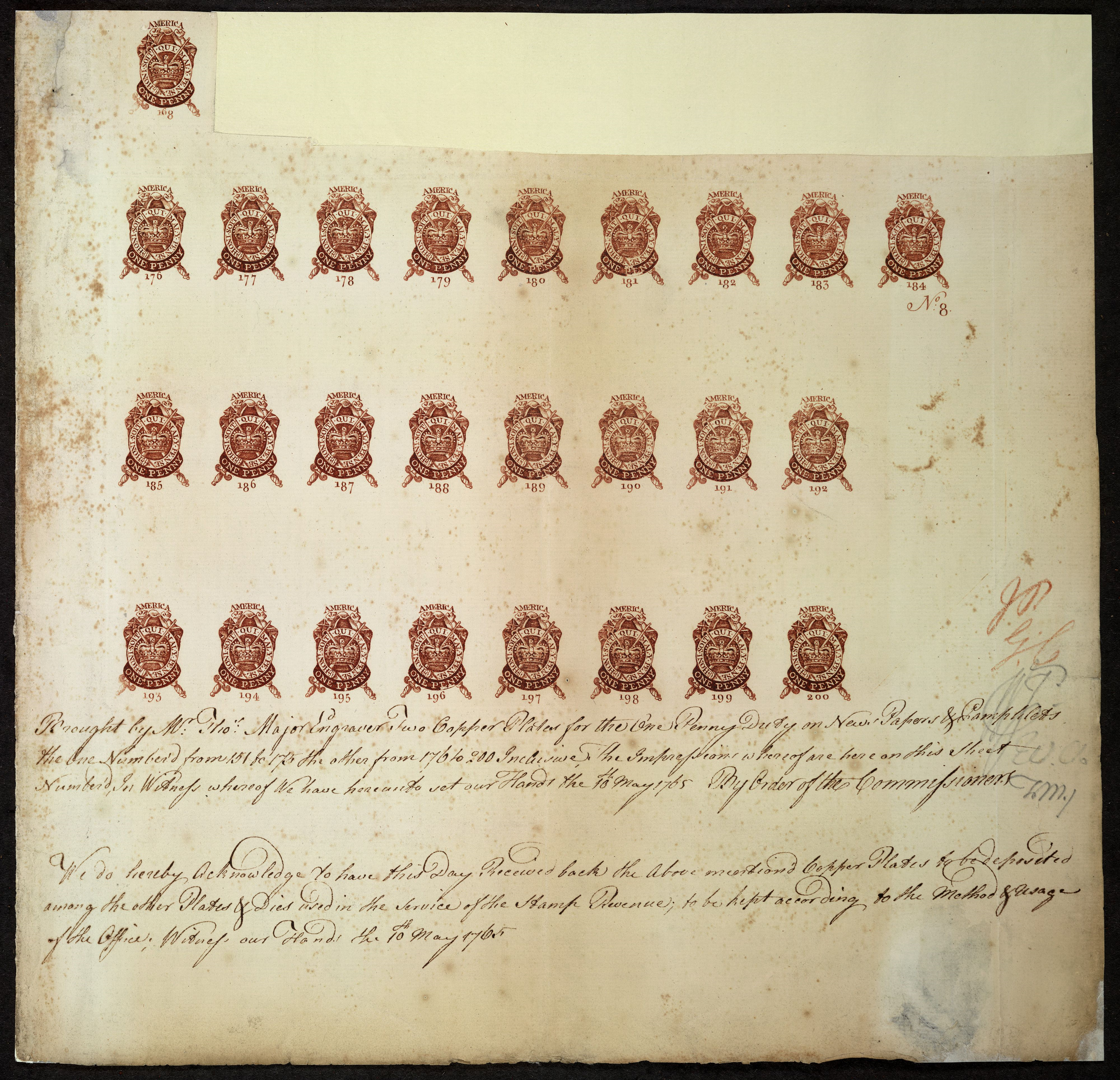
- A primary object in the Collections is this unique proof sheet of one-penny revenue stamps for America submitted for approval to the Commissioners of Stamps by the engraver, dated 10 May 1765.
- Housed at: British Library
- Curators: Richard Scott Morel
- Website: bl.uk/philatelycollectionshub

The British Library Philatelic Collections is the national philatelic collection of the United Kingdom with over 8 million items from around the world. It was established in 1891 as part of the British Museum Library, later to become the British Library, with the collection of Thomas Tapling. In addition to bequests and continuing donations, the library received consistent deposits by the Crown Agency and has become a primary research collection for British Empire and international history. The collections contain a wide range of artefacts in addition to postage stamps, from newspaper stamps to a press used to print the first British postage stamps.

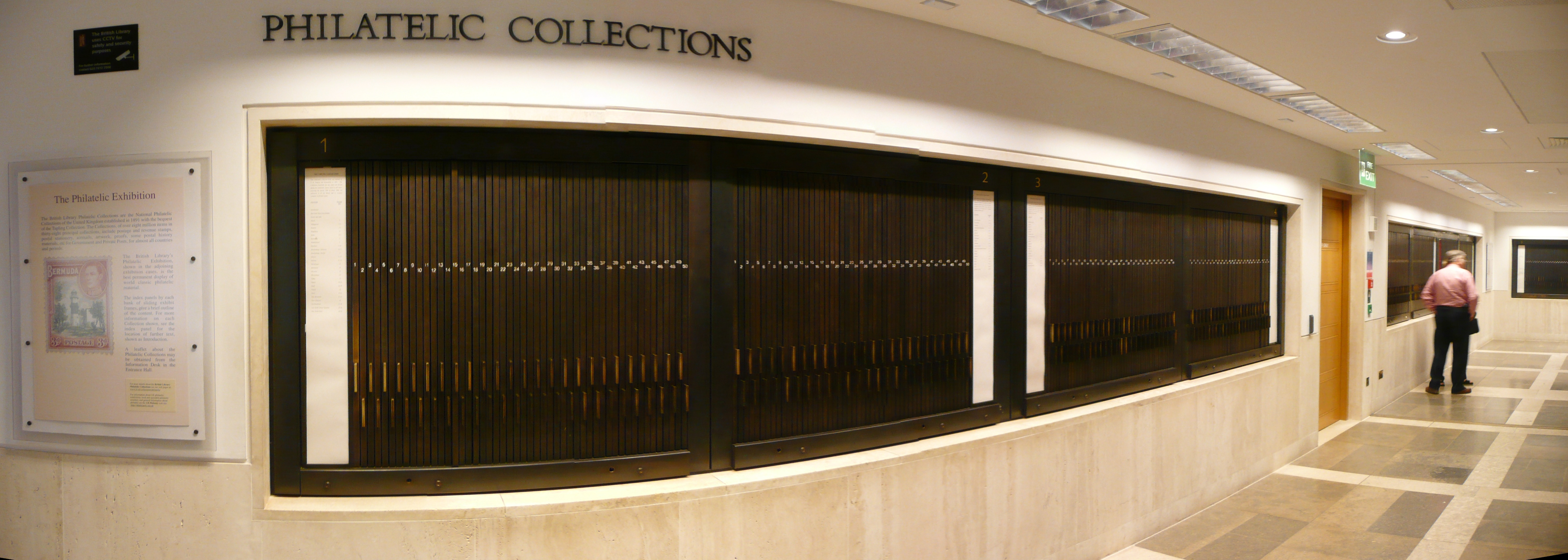
Panoramic view of the collections on display.

== History ==
A unique block of nine penny stamps from New South Wales, Australia, with an illustration of Sydney, dating from 1850 (August). Part of the Tapling Collection.

The first notable philatelic donation was in 1890 by Hubert Haes of two albums of postage stamps collected by himself and Walter Van Noorden. It was donated with the request that the British Museum library (now the British Library) would create a philatelic collection.

The following year the collections were established with the bequest of the Tapling Collection. The probate value of the Tapling Collection was set at £12,000 but on arrival Richard Garnett (Assistant Keeper of Printed Books) estimated their value at more than £50,000 and described the bequest as the most valuable gift since the Grenville Library in 1847.

In 1900 the Crown Agents for the Colonies sent three albums of postage stamps made on their order for colonial governments and then sent specimens of all future stamps commissioned.

In 1913, the Crawford Library was received which forms the cornerstone of the British Library's philatelic literature collection, containing about 4,500 works. The Crawford Library was donated by the Earl of Crawford in his Will and was the foremost collection of philatelic books in the world at the time.

In 1944 Mrs A. Cunningham donated her father's collection (Edward Mosely) of African stamps and in 1949 Mrs. Clement Williams donated her late brother's collection (H. L'Estrange Ewen) of railway letter stamps, valued at £10,000. After being offered in 1942 but delayed due to the collections being in secure war storage, in 1951 it was announced that Mrs Augustine Fitzgerald had donated an extensive air mail collection. The Mosely and Fitzgerald collections were valued at the time at £30,000.

The Department of Printed Books had been in charge of the Philatelic Collections by default rather than design. In 1936 there was an unsuccessful proposal to move the collections to the Department of Prints and Drawings and in 1946 there was a further proposal for the Department of Coins and Medals to take charge. No decision could be agreed and Printed Books continued to manage the collections until they were passed to the newly formed British Library in 1973.

== Curators ==
From 1948, H. R. Holmes had been the curator but in the late 1950s had wished to relinquish the post. A replacement curator was not easily found and the care of the Collections was managed on a part-time basis. A security crisis in 1959 developed after it was discovered that the contents of one of the frames in the Tapling Collection was missing. In 1961 James A. Mackay was recruited as a research assistant to take care of the Collections. In 1971 the police arrested Mackay (promoted to Assistant Keeper in 1965) and charged him with stealing items from the British Museum Philatelic Collections on loan from the Crown Agents. The stolen progressive proofs (test prints of stamp designs) should have been returned to the Crown Agents for destruction and were valued at £7,600. Mackay had exchanged the proofs for Winston Churchill stamps worth £400. He was fined £1,000 and dismissed from the Museum. As a result of the thefts, security was improved by recruiting Bob Schoolley-West, one of the investigating police officers. The Crown Agents withdrew their agreement for lending new stamps for display in the King's Library.

David Beech joined the British Library as a philatelic curator in 1983 and was appointed Head of the Philatelic Collections in 1991. Beech is a former President of The Royal Philatelic Society London and joint founder of the International Philatelic Libraries Association, he retired in 2013. Paul Skinner (philatelist) was appointed Curator in 2004 and became Lead Curator on the retirement of David Beech and retired in December 2025.

Richard Scott Morel joined as Curator in 2014. He is overseeing the digitization of the Philatelic Collection’s holdings. As a result of this work, the first digital version of the Row Collection was published online in 2025 to support public access and research. The collection comprises 23 volumes, 1,358 pages, and 24,473 items documenting the postage stamps and postal stationery of Siam (modern-day Thailand) from 1881 to 1918. High-resolution images and descriptive metadata are available through the Internet Archive. Archival catalogue records are structured to ISAD(G) standards and published on the Find an Archive section of The National Archives' Discovery database, where the collection is browsable at fonds, series, sub-series, and file level.

== Description ==
The material is organized in 78 major collections and archives which have been acquired by donation, bequest, or transfer from Government Departments. The Collections include postage and revenue stamps, postal stationery, essays, proofs, covers and entries, "cinderella stamp" material, specimen issues, airmails, some postal history materials and official and private posts for almost all countries and periods. Philately is interpreted in its widest sense and the more unusual artefacts include original unused artwork, horse licences and the pilot's licence of Captain John Alcock.

A permanent exhibit of items from the Collections is on display in the British Library entrance area upper ground floor, which may be the best gallery of diverse classic stamps and philatelic material in the world. Approximately 80,000 items on 6,000 sheets may be viewed in 1,000 display frames; 2,400 sheets are from the Tapling Collection. Other material, which covers the whole world, is available to students and researchers by appointment.

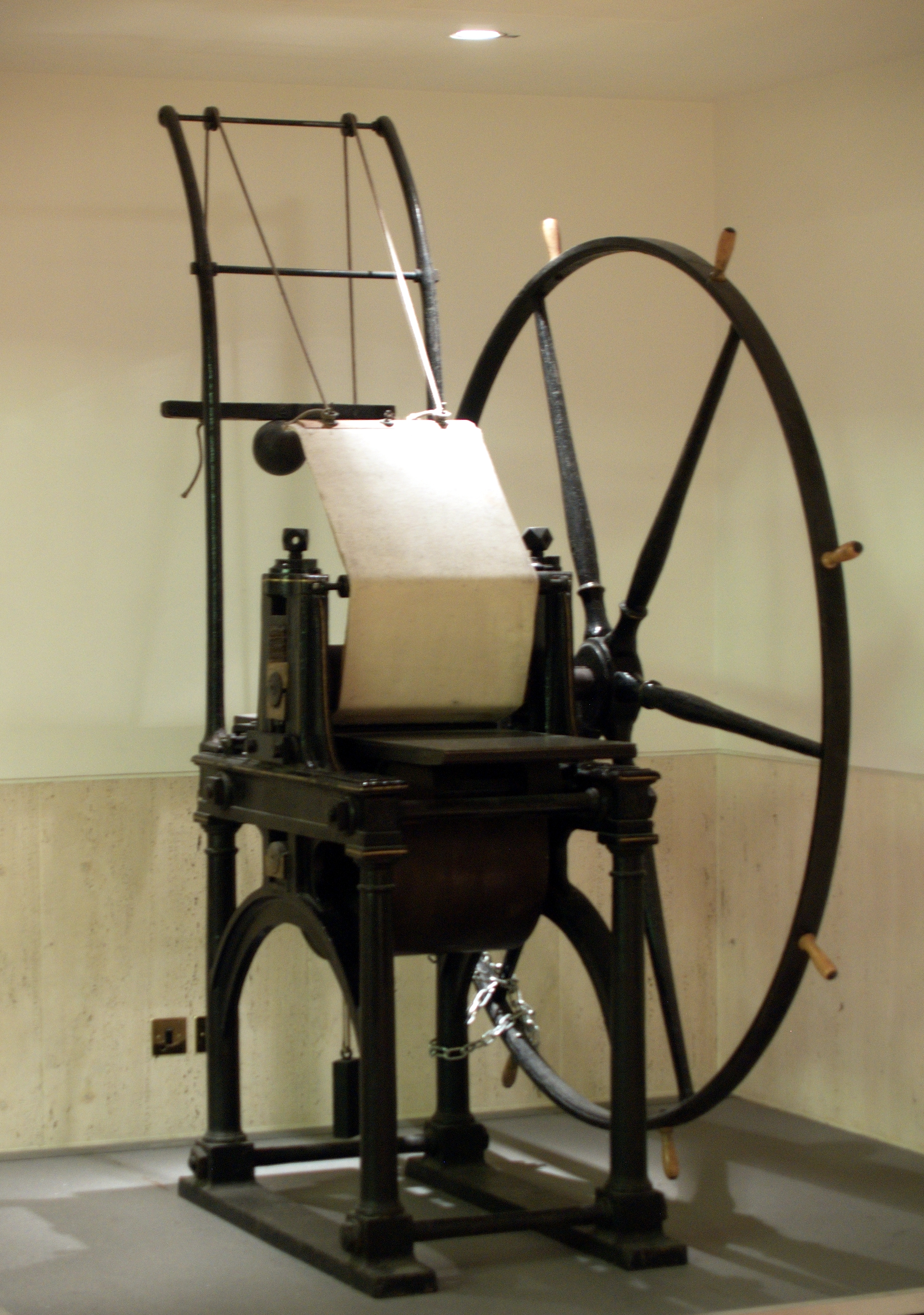
Perkins D cylinder press used to print the first postage stamps of Great Britain and Ireland, the Penny Black.

The British Library Philatelic Department Photograph Collection is a collection of photographs of philatelic material not in the Library's collections. Mostly composed of material donated by philatelic auctioneers, the collection is an important resource for researchers.

As well as these collections, the library actively acquires literature on the subject. This makes the British Library one of the world's leading philatelic research centres.

== Holdings of the British Library Philatelic Collections ==
This table has been compiled using David R. Beech Guide to Philatelic Research at the British Library. London: 2019 and the catalogue of the British Library Philatelic Collections available on the 'Find an Archive' platform accessible via the National Archives 'Discovery' database.

Title	Scope & Content	Date Range	Reference	Available Online
Bailey Collection	Philatelic and postal history collection of Spanish Civil War (1936-1949) material.	1936-1939	Philatelic 1	No
Blackburn Collection	Philatelic and postal history collection including Spanish Civil War (1936-1939) material; 17th century letters from Kings Philip II, Philip III and Phillip IV of Spain as well as correspondence carried by the Message Carriers of Cadiz.	1600-1939	Philatelic 2	No
Blaikie Collection	Collection of 19th century German postal seals.	1850-1900	Philatelic 3	No
Bojanowicz Collection	Collection of Polish 1938-1946 postage stamps and postal history. Includes ghetto posts, underground posts, Warsaw Scout post, Polish Government in Exile, Prisoner of War mail and Polish Free Forces.	1938-1946	Philatelic 4	No
Booth Papers	Collection of research documents compiled and used for the preparation of Roger Booth: 'A Catalogue of the Revenue Stamps of the U.K., Isle of Man, Channel Islands and Eire' published in 1990.	1980-1980	Philatelic 5	No
Burnett Collection	Collection of Hyderabad stamps, postal stationery and postal history.	1880-1950	Philatelic 6	No
Campbell-Johnston Collection	International collection of poster 'cinderella' stamps mainly advertising exhibitions c. 1850 to the 1920s.	1850-1929	Philatelic 7	No
Chinchen Collection	Collection comprising sheets of Lundy Island Postage Stamps, proofs and covers.	1912-1993	Philatelic 8	No
Chinchen Papers	Collection of research papers as well as facsimiles of documents and other materials relating to British revenue and social security.	1914-1920	Philatelic 9	No
Chismon Collection	Collection of Croatian postal history, postage stamps and other philatelic material.	1838-1942	Philatelic 10	No
Contributions Agency Collection	Collection of British National Insurance Stamps, primarily the essays for the unissued 1993-1994 set and a manual 'Grovering' machine for cancelling stamped cards.	1993-1994	Philatelic 11	No
Crawford Papers	Collection of papers relating to the postage stamps of Tristan da Cunha issued between 1945-1997.	1946-1997	Philatelic 12	No
Crown Agents Collection	International collection of unused British Commonwealth postage stamps both issued and some unissued.	1922-2007	Philatelic 13	No
Crown Agents Philatelic and Security Printing Archive	Official archive of the philatelic and security printing operations of the Crown Agents for the Colonies from 1861; Crown Agents for Overseas Governments and Administrations from 1954 and Crown Agents Ltd in 1997. Includes requisition books, registers of dies and plates, paper issue books, specimen issue books, proof material, pre-production artwork, research materials and colour trials for issued and unissued postage stamps, revenue stamps, postal stationery, covers, postal orders and paper money for much of the British Commonwealth and some other countries.	1913-2007	Philatelic 14	No
Davies Collection	Collection of Libya postage stamps, revenue (fiscal) stamps and their usage. Includes proofs, specimens, issued stamps, cylinder blocks, postage due stamps, international reply coupons, official mail and paper money.	1941-1976	Philatelic 15	No
Discworld Stamp Collection	Collection of Discworld fantasy stamps ('Cinderellas') derived from the stories of Terry Pratchett (1948-2015).	2004-2014	Philatelic 16	No
Dolphin Collection	Collection of Great Britain mail, primarily Post Paid impressions and similar material. Also includes mail tested for Anthrax contamination.	1990-2012	Philatelic 17	No
Drysdall Papers	Research papers of relating to Transvaal and various Southern Africa postage stamp issues from the nineteenth century.	1933-2017	Philatelic 18	No
Ertughrul Collection	Collection of philatelic material relating to the postal services of the United Nations Peacekeeping Force in Cyprus (UNFICYP) during the Greek-Turkish Conflict. Also includes some Red Cross and intercommunity covers.	1964-2010	Philatelic 19	No
Ewen Collection	Great Britain and Ireland railway letter stamps, used covers as well as associated materials and provenance papers.	1889-1912	Philatelic 20	No
The Feldheim Collection	Collection of German States with particular focus on Bavaria as well as Thurn and Taxis.	1908-1997	Philatelic 21	No
FitzGerald Collection	Worldwide collection of air mails to the 1930s particularly strong in material from Canada, France, Germany, Italy, Newfoundland, New Zealand and the United States of America (USA).	1870-1938	Philatelic 22	No
Fletcher Collection	Collection covering three centuries of the public and private postal services of Great Britain and Ireland. Half the collection focuses upon pre-adhesive era postal history and other markings illustrating the development and operation of various postal services. The remainder focuses on postage stamps, including plate reconstructions and postal stationery.	1660-1968	Philatelic 23	No
Foreign Office Collection	Archival collection of Germany 1945-1948 Allied Military Administration issues of postage stamps. Includes proofs, colour trials and issued stamps.	1945-1948	Philatelic 24	No
Foreign and Commonwealth Office (FCO) Collection	International collection of British Commonwealth stamps, revenue stamps, postal stationery and some paper money from c. 1890-1992. Includes some of the printing plates for the North Borneo 1894 issue postage stamps.	1840-1992	Philatelic 25	No
General Collection	World collection of all small acquisitions philatelic, postal history, paper money and security printing materials reviewed from 1922 to the present time. Includes the Great Britain St Kilda Mailboat, the Perkins 'D' Cylinder Press, various printing dies, plates and stamps.	1600-2022	Philatelic 26	No
Ginger Collection	Philatelic collection of Victoria (Australia) 1850 to 1883 postage stamps.	1850-1883	Philatelic 27	No
Harrison Collection	Working archive of British Commonwealth progressive and complete die proofs formed by prominent stamp engraver, Augustus Charles Harrison (1872-1955). Also includes book plate material and proofs from Brazil, Cook Islands Rarotonga, Great Britain, Jamaica, Siam, South Africa, Malta and North Borneo.	1911-1937	Philatelic 28	No
Harrison and Sons Collection	Collection of materials formed by the security printing firm Harrisons & Sons Limited, London on the Egypt 1921-1922 and Palestine 1927-1945 postage stamp issues.	1921-1945	Philatelic 29	No
Hasluck Collection	Collection of Albanian postage stamps relating to the first issue of independent Albania of 16 June.	1913	Philatelic 30	No
Hencke Collection	Collection of United States of America (USA) postage stamps c.1950-2004 and Chinese postage stamps from 1912-1986. Includes some 1944-1949 Communist Border postage stamp issues, 1966-1976 Cultural Revolution era postage stamps and some First Day Covers (FDCs).	1912-2004	Philatelic 31	No
Heys Collection	Worldwide collection of 'QSL' stamps and cards issued by amateur radio operators for radio reception reports.	1930-1997	Philatelic 32	No
Heyes Collection	Collection of Great Britain commemorative telegrams.	1935-1980	Philatelic 33	No
HM Customs and Excise Collection	Archive of British revenue stamps in proof or registration form. Includes Table Water Duty, Medicine Tax, Playing Cards Tax, Stamps and Pension Order Forms.	1827-1923	Philatelic 34	No
HM Stationery Office Collection	Official archive of British revenue material generated for the security printing activities of HM Stationery Office (HMSO) for Government. Includes National Savings, National Insurance, stamps, permits, licences, passes, coupons, tokens, cheques, postal orders and pension orders.	1934-1958	Philatelic 35	No
Holman Collection	Collection of Great Britain and Ireland local or private posts, official mail, postmarks, postal stationery, recorded delivery materials. Includes railway letter service, Christmas Scout posts, island posts, omnibus parcels posts materials and associated stamps.	1800-2017	Philatelic 36	No
Horton Collection	Collection of Second World War internee mail comprising the correspondence of the Horton family during their internment as prisoners of war in Europe.	1939-1945	Philatelic 37	No
Board of Inland Revenue Stamping Department Archive	Large government archive comprising official records of the Board of Inland Revenue Stamping Department, documenting the manufacture, registration, and control of British revenue stamps. Maintained by successive UK government bodies — the Board of Stamps (1694–1834), Board of Stamps & Taxes (1834–1849), and Board of Inland Revenue (1849–1966). Transferred to the British Museum Philatelic Collections in January 1966 under the Public Records Act and to the British Library in 1972 under the British Library Act.	1710–1971	Philatelic 38	No
Imperial War Museum's Stamp Collection	Worldwide collection of postage stamps issued during or associated with the First World War.	1914-1918	Philatelic 39	No
Johnson Collection	Postcard collection focusing upon social aspects of the British Post Office's history. Also includes Christmas cards and photographs illustrating letter boxes.	1900-2008	Philatelic 40	No
Josten Collection	Collection of Czechoslovakia 1939-1945 Second World War Government in exile philatelic and postal history materials.	1939-1945	Philatelic 41	No
Kay Collection	International collection of Great Britain and British Commonwealth embossed and adhesive revenue stamps from 1967 to c.1940.	1697-1940	Philatelic 42	No
Kaluski Collection	Collection of stamp issues and some postal history material from Poland, Russia, the German Occupation and Polish Government in Exile.	1835-2002	Philatelic 43	No
Krinsky Collection	nan	1950	Philatelic 44	No
Landmark Trust Lundy Island Philatelic Archive	Archival collection of artwork, essays, proof material and issued stamps for Lundy Island in addition to an extensive range of postmarking devices in used from 1929.	1929-1991	Philatelic 45	No
Langmead Collection	Collection of Great Britain and Ireland telegraph stamps and stationery.	1851-1881	Philatelic 46	No
Marx Collection	Collection of United States of America (USA) late nineteenth century 'fancy cancellations' on stamps and some covers. Includes some fakes.	1850-1900	Philatelic 47	No
McInroy Collection	Worldwide collection of postal meter stamps.	1900-2003	Philatelic 48	No
Model Collection	Collection of German local provisional postage stamps issued following the allied occupation of Germany after the Second World War (1939-1945). Includes unused and used on covers, comprising obliterated Hitler Head issues and several town issues.	1945-1946	Philatelic 49	No
Mosely Collection	Collection of postage stamps from British Colonial Africa. Largely in unused conditions with particular emphasis on the Cape of Good Hope, Mauritius, Rhodesia and St Helena.	1853-1935	Philatelic 50	No
Monks Collection	Collection of South African air mails.	1911-1960	Philatelic 51	No
Muraleetharan Papers	Research papers concerning various British Commonwealth postage stamp issues including the 1935 Silver Jubilee issue, the 1937 Coronation issue, the 1947 Victory or Peace issue and the 1953 Coronation issue. Materials on the Royal portraits adopted on postage stamps from the reigns of George V, George VI and Elizabeth II. Also correspondence relating to security printing with various organizations such as the Royal Mint, De La Rue and Australian archives.	1907-1953	Philatelic 52	No
Murray Collection	Collection of China postage stamps from the 1865 Large Dragon issues to the mid-1950s mainly in unused condition as well as some blocks and covers. Also includes postage stamps from Great Britain, Sarawak and other Commonwealth countries. Notable items within the collection includes a copy of the China 1897 Revenue 2c on 3c surcharge double both inverted being position twenty.	1865-1955	Philatelic 53	No
Philatelic & Postal History Photograph Collection	Photographic collection of important worldwide philatelic and postal history materials not held within the British Library's Philatelic Collections.	1973-2000	Philatelic 54	No
Postal Authority Pre-Issue Publicity Collection	Worldwide collection of official leaflets, press releases and associated ephemera concerning to the release of various postage stamp issues and related philatelic products.	1960-2000	Philatelic 55	No
ProPhil Forum Collection	International collection of reproduction, facsimile or forged stamps and covers produced without permission by ProPhil Forum POC GmbH in the mid-1980s from copyright photographs of philatelic material in the Philatelic Collections of the British Library in addition to material from the postal museums in Bonn and Bern. Includes numerous dies and plates.	1985-1987	Philatelic 56	No
Row Collection	Collection formed by Richard Williams Harold Row. Collection of Siam (Thailand) postage stamps and postal stationery from 1881 to 1918. Mainly unused with many blocks and includes issues used in Kedah and Kelantan.	1881–1918	Philatelic 57	Yes. Collection available online via external repository.
Royal Philatelic Society London (RPSL) Meeting Notes Collection	Collection of notes and papers presented to the membership and fellows of the Royal Philatelic Society London (RPSL) circulated during meetings or presentations.	1950-2022	Philatelic 58	No
Ryan Collection	Collection of Hungary municipal revenue stamps of Budapest, 1898-1947, in proof and issued form.	1898-1947	Philatelic 59	No
Schooley-West Collection	Collection of East Germany official mail between the 1940s and 1970s, comprising both postage stamps and covers.	1940-1970	Philatelic 60	No
Seymour Collection	Collection of Airmails associated with the development and operation of the British Comet aircraft formed by the philatelist Kenneth Aubrey Seymour (1914-2003).	1949-1960	Philatelic 61	No
Scott Collection	Collection of Great Britain Inland Air Mails. Includes a specialised section of 1912 Daily Mail flights.	1772-1977	Philatelic 62	No
Shelley Collection	Collection of Spanish Civil War philatelic and postal history material mainly comprising covers used to and from the International Brigades in Spain.	1936-1939	Philatelic 63	No
Sherborn Collection	Collection of Great Britain Queen Victoria embossed 1d pink postal stationery envelopes.	1841-1885	Philatelic 64	No
Smith Collection	International collection of League of Nations and United Nations (UN) postage stamps and covers.	1927-1995	Philatelic 65	No
Smithsonian National Postal Museum Collection	Archive of United States of America revenue stamps in proof blocks of four. Tax subjects covered include food, drugs, documents and taxable consumables.	1916-1970	Philatelic 66	No
Solidarity Collection	Collection of propaganda labels designed, printed and issued by the Independent Self-Governing Trade Union "Solidarity," an organization widely recognised to have played an important role in the end of Communist rule within Poland.	1985-1990	Philatelic 67	No
Supplementary Collection	Worldwide collection of postage stamps, postage dues and some proof material formed as a continuation of the Tapling Collection (See Philatelic 69) c. 1922. Includes British Commonwealth material donated to the British Museum's Philatelic Collections by the Crown Agents between 1900 and 1922.	1850-1922	Philatelic 68	No
Tapling Collection	Worldwide collection of 1840-1890 postage stamps and postal stationery with some telegraph stamps. Virtually complete in all basic issues it contains countless philatelic rarities strong in unused examples with an excellent range of shades. Includes essays, proof material, blocks and some covers.	1840-1890	Philatelic 69	No
HM Treasury Excise Correspondence Collection	Nationwide collection of British correspondence between the Treasury and Excise Offices which includes a wide variety of postal markings and rates.	1826-1849	Philatelic 70	No
Turner Collection	Three philatelic collections formed by Sidney Robert Turner (1881-1972) comprising: 1. Worldwide collection of forged postage stamps issued to c.1900; 2. Great Britain and Ireland Railway Letter stamps (1891-1940s); 3. Collection of Great Britain and Ireland newspaper, pamphlet and almanack tax stamps (1710-1870) and 1694 6d Revenue (Fiscal) stamps	1694-1945	Philatelic 71	No
Universal Postal Union (UPU) Collection	Official archive of worldwide postage stamps and postal stationery issued by Universal Postal Union (UPU) member countries from 1874 to 1992. Comprising specimen or unused examples as distributed by the Universal Postal Union.	1874-1992	Philatelic 72	No
Vermeule Collection	A small collection of United States of America pre-cancelled postage stamps.	1953	Philatelic 73	No
Walker Collection	Collection of Guernsey and Channel Islands 1939-1945, Second World War, German Occupation postage stamp issues. Includes various covers, bisected stamps and sheets.	1939-1945	Philatelic 74	No
Wherry Collection	Collection of 1914-1918 First World War postcards, mainly British and French.	1914-1918	Philatelic 75	No
Williams Papers	Research papers, notes and some photographs formed by Leon Norman Williams (1914-1999) and Maurice Williams (1905-1976) in preparation of their various books and articles.	1940-1999	Philatelic 76	No
Wilson-Todd Collection	International collection of covers and postage stamps issued during, or associated with the First World War including 'War Tax' issues.	1914-1918	Philatelic 77	No
Zagorsky Collection	Forgery collection of the early postage stamp issues of Bulgaria, 1879-1885.	1879-1885	Philatelic 78	No

== Selected notable items ==
The Collections include a unique proof sheet of 26 Revenue 1765 Newspaper and Pamphlet one penny impressions showing the registration certificate, held in the Board of Inland Revenue Stamping Department Archive. These were issued to apply the Stamp Act 1765 intended to raise taxes to fund the defence of the American Colonies from the French. The tax applied to legal documents, licences, newspapers, pamphlets and almanacs in the American Colonies, Quebec, Nova Scotia, Newfoundland, Florida, the Bahamas and the West Indian Islands. The taxes resulted in public protest and rioting. The tax was abandoned after a few months due to its unpopularity but the political damage contributed to the War of Independence in 1775.

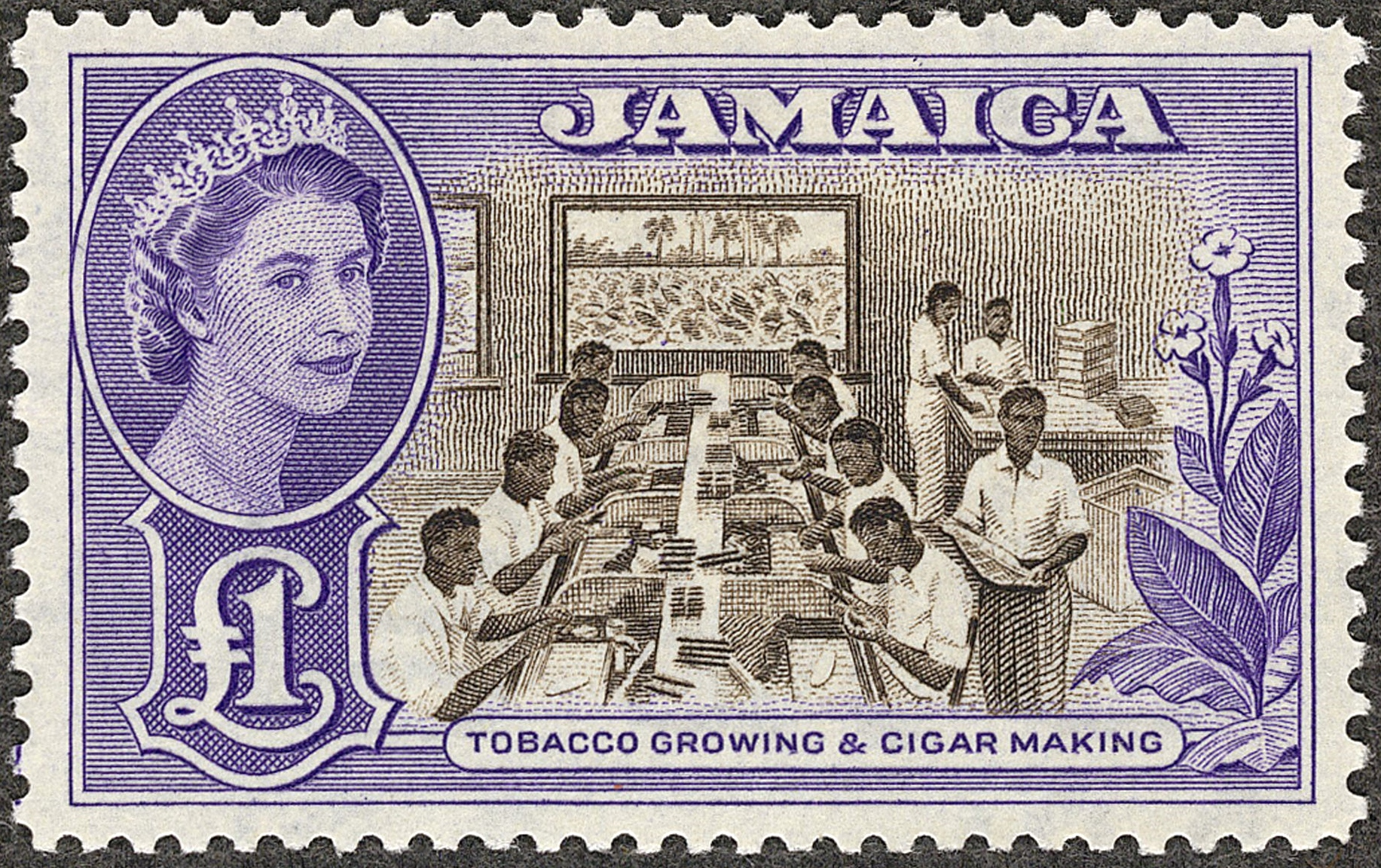
Unissued 1956 £1 Jamaican chocolate and violet, the first stamp designed for Queen Elizabeth II. Held in the British Library Crown Agents Collection.

The largest object in the British Library is the Perkins D cylinder press developed by Jacob Perkins and patented in 1819. This press was one of several used to print the first postage stamps of Great Britain and Ireland which were issued in 1840. The press was used for printing many early stamps for British Colonial territories from 1853 including for Cape of Good Hope, Ceylon, Mauritius, St Helena, Trinidad, Western Australia, Ionian Islands, New Brunswick, New South Wales, New Zealand and Victoria.

The £1 stamp issued in Jamaica (1956–1958) in the reign of King George VI shows Tobacco Growing and Cigar Making. The first stamp for Queen Elizabeth II was to be in the same design (chocolate and violet) but was abandoned after printing. There are only seven examples in existence.

The cover of the British Library pocket guide Treasures in Focus - Stamps features the 1913 King George V seahorse master dye proof, part of the Harrison Collection. The engraver, J.A.C. Harrison, took proofs during the creation of the die of which this image is one. The engraving was used on the high value stamps 2/6, 5/-, 10/- and £1.

The Collections feature these rarities which demonstrate international scope:

- Gold Coast: 1883 (May) 1d on 4d magenta, unique
- India: 1854 4 annas blue and pale red, error head inverted, two used on a cover, unique.
- Mauritius 1847 1d red used on cover and 2d blue, the "Post Office" issue 1d. orange-red, used on cover. The first British Colonial postage stamps were issued in Mauritius in 1847.
- New South Wales: 1850 1d and 3d essays of the Sydney View issue. The first stamps of New South Wales, being 1d, 2d and 3d values, were issued in 1850.
- Spain: 1851 2 reales, error of colour, one of three known.
- St Helena: 1961 Tristan Relief Fund 5c.+6d., 7½c.+9d., and 10c.+1/-, used on a postcard. Only the Colonial Office in London could authorize new stamps, a fact clearly unknown to the Governor, and the issue was withdrawn. These are among the rarest of modern stamps as only 434 sets were sold.
- Switzerland: Zürich: 1843 4 rappen, the unique unsevered horizontal strip of five.
- Uruguay: 1858 120 centavos blue and 180 centavos green, in tête-bêche pairs, two of five known.
- Western Australia: 1854-55 4d blue, error frame inverted.
- United States of America - Inverted Jenny, one of a set of 100 postage stamps first issued on May 10, 1918, with probably the most famous error in American philately and one of the most expensive stamps ever produced

== See also ==
- The Row Collection, 1883–1918 at the Internet Archive
- The Row Collection entry in Find an Archive at The National Archives
- List of philatelic libraries
- National Philatelic Collection (United States)
- Philately
- Royal Philatelic Society London

== References and sources ==
Sources

- Day, Alan Edwin (1998), Inside the British Library, Library Association, ISBN 978-1-85604-280-2
- Harris, Philip Rowland (1998), A History of the British Museum Library, 1753–1973, British Library, ISBN 978-0-7123-4562-0
- Schoolley-West, R. F. (1987), Stamps, British Library, ISBN 978-0-7123-0127-5
