= List of stamp catalogues =

This article is an incomplete list of stamp catalogs.

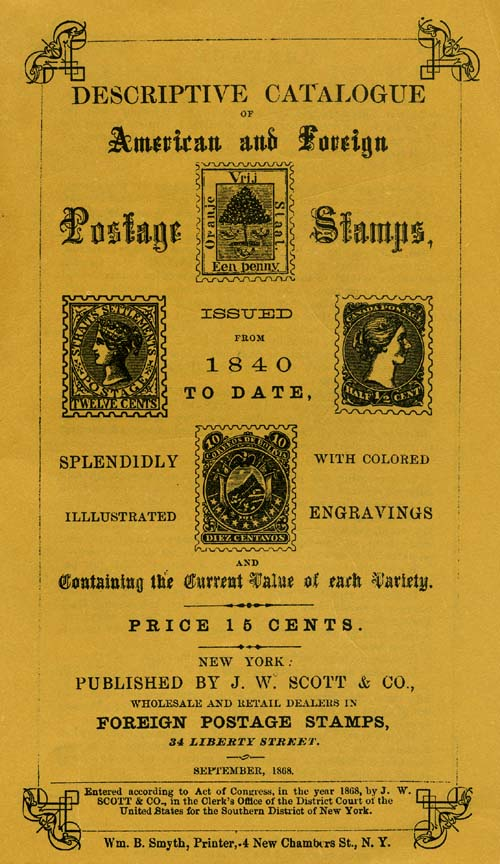
An early stamp catalogue from Scott published in 1868

== Europe ==
- AFA specialkatalog: Danmark, Færøerne, Grønland, Dansk Vestindien og Slesvig (Denmark)
- Afinsa (Portugal)
- Anfils (Spain)
- Austria Netto Katalog (ANK) (Austria)
- Bolaffi (Italy)
- Catalogue of USSR postage stamps (Soviet Union, Russia; Каталог почтовых марок СССР)
- CEI (Italy)
- Cérès (France)
- Chuchin, F.G. (Russia - Zemstvos)
- Connoisseur Catalogue of Machin Stamps (United Kingdom)
- Dallay (France)
- Domfil (Spain)
- Edifil (Spain)
- Facit catalog (all countries of Scandinavia)
- Fischer catalog (Poland)
- Froede (Germany, active to 1941)
- Hellas 2012: stamp catalogue and postal history = katalogos grammatosēmōn kai tachydromikē historia (Greece)
- Hermes (Greece)
- Hibernian (Ireland)
- Jacobs, V.A. (Russia - USSR special catalogue)
- JB Catalogue (Malta)
- LAPE (Finland) Standard catalogue is published annually, specialized catalogue replaces standard catalogue every few years.
- Lipsia (until 1990), only stamp catalog of the DDR. (Editor: Verlag Transpress Leipzig, DDR)
- MacDonnell Whyte (Stamps of Ireland Specialised Catalogue)
- Magyar Posta és Illetékbélyeg Katalógus (Hungary)
- Maury (France), A specialized catalog of France formed from the combination of Cérès and Dallay
- Michel catalog (Germany)
- Mundifil Postage Stamps of Portugal and Colonies
- Norgeskatalogen (Norway)
- Norma Norma [year] – a specialized catalog of Finland postage stamps published annually, tri-lingual (Finnish, Swedish, English) Standard catalogue is published annually, specialized catalogue replaces standard catalogue every few years. Currently in internet https://www.kapylanmerkki.fi/norma/
- NVPH Speciale Catalogus (The Netherlands & colonies)
- OBP-COB (Belgium)
- Philex (Germany)
- Pofis catalogue (Czechoslovakia)
- Prifix (Luxembourg)
- Ruch catalog (Poland)
- Sassone (Italy)
- Stoneham Great Britain Stamp Catalogue (United Kingdom)
- V.U. Soloviev (Russia)
- Stanley Gibbons (Great Britain)
- The Complete Machin Stamp Catalogue (United Kingdom)
- Unificato (Italy)
- Yvert et Tellier (France)
- Zagorsky Standard Collection (Russia)
- Zumstein (Switzerland)

== Americas ==
- Durland Standard Plate Number Catalog (plate blocks of United States postage and revenue issues and related areas)
- Hebert's Catalogue of Plate Number Singles (specializing in plate number singles of United States and related stamp issues)
- Holmes (Canada, published from 1935 to 1968)
- Ma's Illustrated Catalogue Of The Stamps Of China (China)
- Minkus (USA, active until 2004)
- Newfoundland specialized stamp catalogue (Canada)
- Schiffer catalog: Catálogo de Selos do Brasil (Brazil)
- Scott catalogue (USA)
- Sellos postales argentinos: 1856-2010 (Argentina)
- Unitrade Specialized Catalogue of Canadian Stamps

== Asia and Oceania ==
- Australasian stamp catalogue (Australia)
- BALE (Israel)
- Brusden-White (Australia)
- Burak Pul Evi Kataloğu - Spesyalize Türk Pullari Kataloğu (Specialized Postage Stamp Catalog of Turkey)
- Burak Pul Evi Yayinlari - Ilk Türk Pullari / Tugrali Pullar (The First Turkish Stamps Stamps with the monogram of the Sultans)
- Catabooks Publishing - Thematic Catalogs / Gandhi Stamp Catalog (The First India theme based Stamp Caatalogs)
- Campbell Paterson (New Zealand)
- Chan Stamp Catalogue of China (1878-1949)
- Comprehensive Colour Catalogue of Australian Stamps
- Farahbakhash Catalogue Of 2010: The Stamps Of Iran – Qajar, Pahlavi, Islamic Republic Of Iran (Iran)
- Isfila (Turkey)
- JSCA Japanese Stamp Specialized Catalog (Japan)
- JSDA Japanese Stamp Dealers’ Association Catalogue (Japan)
- Katalog Prangko Indonesia = Indonesian postage stamp catalogue (Indonesia)
- Len Jury Stamp catalogue - New Zealand
- Stamps NZ - New Zealand
- Livingston "Catalog of the Shanghai Postal System" (Wei-Liang Chow 2nd edition 1990)/(L.F. Livingston First edition 1971)
- Ngo’s Catalogue of Philippine Republic Stamps & Postal Stationeries (Philippine)
- Phila India (India)
- Postage Stamps Catalogue of the People's Republic of China (China), China Posts and Telecom Press
- Pulko Osmali İmpararatorluğu ve Türkiye Cumhuriyeti Posta Pullari Kataloğu (Ottoman Empire and Republic of Turkey Postage Stamp Catalog)
- Pulhan: Türk Pullari Kataloğu (Turkey Postage Stamp Catalog)
- Sakura Catalogue of Japanese Stamps (Japan)
- Standard Catalogue of Malaysia, Singapore, Brunei, Steven Tan, International Stamp & Coin Sdn. Bhd.
- Siddiqui Stamps Catalogue (Pakistan)
- Suriwongse (Sakserm) until 2004 (Thailand)
- Thai Stamps Catalogue (Thailand), Somchai Saeng-Ngern
- Taiwan Color Catalogue, Alex Yeh
- Umungwan Korean Postage Stamp Catalogue (South Korea)
- Yang (Hong Kong, Liberated areas, PRC)

== Other, worldwide, unspecified ==
- Atlas Catalogue of R.S.A (Republic of South Africa)
- Barefoot Catalogue (Revenues)
- Borek (World catalogue)
- Colnect (online only)
- Find Your Stamps Value (online only) (specializing in US, GB, and other stamps)
- Freestampcatalogue
- Inoubli (Tunisia)
- Richard Zimmermann Catalog (The joint stamp issues catalog)
- Sanabria's Air Post Catalogue (Worldwide airmail stamps; last full catalog, 1966; partial, 1972)
- The South African stamp colour catalogue (South Africa)
- Zonnebloem (stamp catalogue) (Netherlands, Indonesia, Israel, Surinam, United Europe)
