= Minkus =

Minkus is a surname. Notable people with the surname include:

== People ==
- Christian Minkus (1770–1849), German politician;
- Ludwig Minkus (1826–1917), Austrian ballet composer and violinist, best known for his work in Russia;
- Jacques Minkus (1901–1996), philatelic dealer;
- Hannelore Minkus (1928–2020), German actress; (de)
- Friedrich Minkus (born 1968), German architect; (de)

== See also ==
- Minkus catalog for stamp collectors
