= Stamp numbering system =

Philatelists' traditional method of identifying postage stamps uniquely has long been to number each country's stamps consecutively; Norway #1 is the 4-skilling blue stamp issued in 1855, and so forth. However, this seemingly straightforward numbering system runs into immediate difficulties, which have been solved in different ways by different stamp catalogs.

== Issues ==
The difficulties are as follows:

- What is a "country"?
- What is a postage stamp?
- What is a distinct type of postage stamp?
- What if several stamps are issued on the same day?
- What if the date of issue is unknown?
- What if stamps of a single series appear one at a time, interspersed with commemorative stamps?
- Should special-purpose stamps be grouped together?

Although the definition of "country" may seem obvious, there are occupations of one country by another, stamp issued by areas in rebellion, reunifications, and regions that have issued their own stamps for one reason or another. A classic example is Germany: unified from many smaller entities, then divided into multiple zones of occupation at the end of World War II, then divided into West Germany and East Germany, then reunified. Catalogs typically treat West Germany as part of a single sequence under the name "Germany" while giving East German stamps their own numbers.

The definition of "postage stamp" can also be problematic for catalogers. For instance, some countries have issued adhesive labels purporting to be postage stamps, but which had the "cancel" printed directly on the stamp and shipped to dealers, without ever being sold to the public for use on letters. The treatment of these has long been a vexing issue, and catalogs vary greatly on whether to list the stamps. A related issue is a small number of extremely rare stamps that may or may not be old forgeries; the assignment or removal of a number is a key step in the consensus as to their authenticity.

Philatelists typically identify more types of stamps than do the governments issuing them. Changes of perforation, watermark, often occur without any official notice, as do printing errors. In a few cases, even the date of first issue of a stamp has no surviving record.

The issuance of multiple types on a single day is an old practice, but usually these were different denominations, and could be numbered in ascending order of value. More recently, it has become common to issue a group of stamps with related designs and the same denomination on the same day.

Finally, it is common for the stamps of a definitive series to be issued one or a few at a time, as postal rates change. Logically, they are part of a single group, with a unified design theme and a sequence of values, even though ten years or more may have elapsed from the first to the last. The same reasoning could be applied to special-purpose stamps such as airmail or postage due stamps.

== Catalog numbering systems ==
Over time, stamp numbers may become a shorthand for collectors and dealers. Scott Catalogue, Gibbons, Yvert and Michel catalogs all use different arrangements for numbering regular and special-purpose types, and attach different importance to variations in paper, perforation, watermark and other types.

Because of its commercial importance, the publishers of the Scott Catalogue claim copyright on their numbering system, and grant only limited licences for its use by others. The inconsistency with which Scott enforced these licences resulted in a lawsuit by Krause Publications (publishers of the Minkus Catalogue) for copyright infringement. After Krause filed a defence the suit was settled out of court, and Krause continued to reference the Scott numbers. It has been speculated that Scott was not successful. Attempts by philatelists to establish an alternative have not yet been successful.

== Official numbering systems ==
In general, governments have not tried to number their own stamps. The People's Republic of China is a notable exception, having inscribed most of its stamps with a unique numbering system since 1949.

In 2002, as part of efforts to control allegedly illegal stamps, the Universal Postal Union introduced the WADP Numbering System (WNS) for new issues by UPU members.
