= Yang Stamp Catalogue =

Yang's catalogue is one of the three stamp catalogues published by Yang's Philatelic Trading Co. Hong Kong:

Yang's Postage Stamps and Postal History Catalogue of Hong Kong Ming Yang, Tak Yang (25th ed 2018)
Yang's Postage Stamp Catalogue of The People's Republic of China (Liberated Area) Nai-Chiang Yang, 1998, 7th edition
Yang's Postage Stamp Catalogue of the People's Republic of China Part II Nai-Chiang Yang (15th ed 2009)

To correlate Wang catalog numbers and Scott catalogue numbers for Hong Kong consult Hong Kong Scott-Yang Catalog Correlation by Ralph Weil with Michael Rogers. 2006, second edition. To correlate Wang catalog numbers and Scott catalog numbers for the People's Republic of China consult Scott-Yang/Yang-Scott Catalog Correlation of the People's Republic of China (Liberated and Unified Areas) edited by Ralph Weil with Michael Rogers. 2006, Softbound, second edition. To correlate Wang catalog numbers and Scott catalog numbers for the Macau consult Macau Scott-Yang/Yang-Scott Catalog Correlation by Ralph Weil with Michael Rogers. 2006, second edition.

Although the Liberated Area (Communist local issues from 1930-1950) catalogue is now quite old, it is still considered the best existing catalogue of this specialised area.

== Sources ==
- China and Asia Literature Michael Rogers Inc
- Amazon review of the Liberated Area Catalogue
