= WADP =

WADP may refer to:

- World Association for the Development of Philately, a stamp collecting association which sponsors the WADP Numbering System
- WQLE, a defunct radio station (960 AM) licensed to Kane, Pennsylvania, which held the call sign WADP from 1954 to 1965
