= Austria Netto Katalog =

2017 four country Austria Netto Katalog

The Austria Netto Kataloge are Austria's most popular collectors' catalogs. They have been regularly issued since the mid-20th century. Among philatelists, numismatists, and phone card collectors they are considered the authoritative reference catalogs.

The most famous of these catalogs are those issued in the field of philately. These are limited to the Austrian collecting field, and are issued annually. The oldest of these, the Österreich Spezial Katalog (Austria Special Catalog), as of 2007, is in its 63rd edition. Also issued annually are the Österreich Standardkatalog (Austria Standard Catalog) and the Vierländerkatalog (Four Countries Catalog), the latter of which lists all stamps issued in each of the four German-speaking countries: Austria, Germany, Liechtenstein, and Switzerland.

In addition to its stamp catalogs, the Austria Netto Kataloge line also includes annually-issued Austrian coin catalogs and Austrian phone card catalogs. The catalogs' publisher also issues catalogs for special cancellations.

The editor-in-chief of the Austria Netto Kataloge, as of 2008, is Christine Steyrer.

Due to the length of the name Austria Netto Kataloge, collectors often use the abbreviation ANK. Therefore, while also commonly used, the expression ANK catalog is technically redundant.

== Contents ==
The Austria Special Catalog has substantially more content than the Austria Standard Catalog, including:

- personalized stamps
- telegraph stamps
- court tax/revenue stamps
- fiscal and newspaper stamps
- official new prints
- army post (from 1955)
- Lombardy–Venetia stamps
- Austrian Post in Levante Countries
- Austrian Post in Crete
- Bosnia and Herzegovina stamps
- overprinted issues of the successor states
- local issues of the First and Second Austrian Republics
- advertisements and commemorative sheets
- rocket mail
- Austrian Airlines opening flights
- United Nations stamps

== See also ==
- List of stamp catalogues
