= Ruch catalog =

The Ruch catalog of postage stamps of Poland, officially titled Ilustrowany Katalog Znaczków Polskich, contained detailed information on Polish postage stamps, and was published on a yearly basis.

The purpose of the catalog was to describe postage stamps related to the country of Poland and to estimate their value in the philatelic market at the time of publication.

== Publisher ==
The catalog was published in Warsaw, Poland, by Agencja Wydawnicza “Ruch”.

== Format ==
The catalog contains black and white illustrations of polish stamps, cancellations, and overprints. Value of individual stamps is listed in Polish currency. The entire catalog is written in Polish.

== Content ==
The catalog covers the full extent of Polish philately and is comprehensive in the following categories.

- Postage stamps of Poland
- City locals
- Austrian occupation
- German occupation
- Military mail
- Exile stamps
- Propaganda stamps
- Post-wartime overprints
- Prisoner-of-war
- Displaced persons
- Postal stationery
- Plebiscite issues
- Port Gdansk
- Cinderellas
- Charity stamps

In addition, the catalog provides detailed information on counterfeit stamps, cancellations and overprints, such as porto and groszy, plus information that is not found or described in depth in other philatelic catalogs, such as Fischer catalog.

== Availability ==
A current edition of the catalog may no longer be available. However, previous yearly editions provide a valuable historic and philatelic resource.

== See also ==
- Stamp catalog
- List of stamp catalogues
- Philately
