= Chan Stamp Catalogue of China =

The Chan's Colour-Illustrated Stamp Catalogue of China (1878–1949) is published in softcover and hardcover editions. Text is in both English and Chinese. As of 2011 the latest edition is the 2-volume, 898 page, 2010 edition.

To correlate catalog numbers between the Chan, Ma, and Scott catalogs China 1878–1949 Scott/Ma/Chan Catalog Correlation Including Japanese Occupation of China, Shanghai-Treaty Ports, and Manchukuo by Ralph Weil with Michael Rogers. 2006, second edition may be useful.

== External links and further reading ==
- "New edition of Chan catalog is indispensable for collectors" article by Michael Rogers published in Linn's November 1, 2010
