= Illegal stamp =

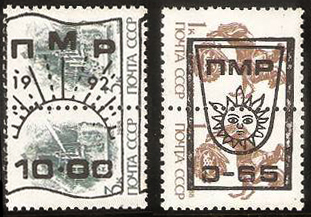
Stamps of the Soviet Union with overprints supposedly from the Pridnestrovian Moldavian Republic. These were produced in 1992 or 1993 without the knowledge or permission of PMR authorities.

Illegal stamps are postage stamp-like labels issued in the names of existing independent countries or territories used to defraud postal administrations, stamp collectors, and the general public. Often, but not always, a member nation of the Universal Postal Union (UPU) will have asked the UPU to issue an "International Bureau Circular" advising others of the illegal stamps. According to the UPU, the market is estimated to be at least $500 million per year.

Illegal stamps are to be distinguished from the many varieties of cinderella stamps which may have some of the same characteristics as illegal stamps but which are not usually issued in the name of an existing country, and from postal forgeries, the illegal counterfeiting of actual stamps.

== Identifying illegal stamps ==
There is no definitive method to identifying illegal stamp issues.

- Many illegal stamps are issued in the names of countries or territories from Africa or the former Soviet Union, or smaller island nations from around the world. Older illegal issues (from the 1970s) were often in the names of Arab states.
- Most illegal stamps are not listed in the major stamp catalogues, though some may have been included in error or because their status is unclear or because the criteria for entry differ from those used by the UPU to recognise valid stamp issues.
- The WADP Numbering System (WNS), developed by the World Association for the Development of Philately and the UPU, catalogues stamps issued by UPU member nations since 2002. Not all UPU members participate.

== See also ==
- Society for the Suppression of Speculative Stamps
