= Hugh Massey Clark =

American philatelist and publisher (1886–1956)

- Born: 1886
- Died: January 21, 1956 (aged 69–70)
- Spouse: Theresa Maria Clark
- Engineering career
- Institutions: American Stamp Dealers Association; Association for Stamp Exhibitions; Philatelic Foundation
- Projects: Purchased Scott Stamp and Coin Company in 1938; served in various philatelic organizations
- Awards: Roll of Distinguished Philatelists; APS Hall of Fame

Hugh Massey Clark (21 January 1886 – 21 January 1956), of New York City, was a noted philatelist and publisher. He was married to Theresa Maria Clark.

== Philatelic editing ==
Hugh Clark joined the Scott Stamp and Coin Company in 1912 and served in various capacities at the company, including being appointed as manager in 1914. Theresa Maria Clark (née Scheidemantel) also worked as an editor at the firm, and they eventually married. In 1935 he and his wife Theresa co-edited the Scott Standard Postage Stamp Catalogue.

In 1938 Hugh and Theresa purchased the firm, sold off the retail postage stamp and coin sales portions of the business, and renamed it Scott Publications. They both continued their work at Scott until they finally sold the firm to Gordon R. Harmer in 1946.

== Philatelic activity ==
Hugh Clark was active in promoting stamp collecting through various media, including radio, newspapers, advertising, and lending frames to philatelists for use at philatelic exhibitions.

Clark was active in supporting or founding a number of philatelic organizations. He was president of the American Stamp Dealers Association for a number of years, was very active in supporting philatelic exhibitions in association with the Association for Stamp Exhibitions, and was a founding member of the Philatelic Foundation.

== Honors and awards ==
In 1947 Hugh Clark signed the Roll of Distinguished Philatelists, and, he was named to the American Philatelic Society Hall of Fame in 1957.

== Legacy ==
When the Clarks sold Scott Publications, they donated its famous reference collection, originally constructed by John Nicholas Luff, to the Philatelic Foundation.

== See also ==
- Stamp collecting
- Philatelic literature
