= Minkus catalogue =

Postage stamps collection

- 1956 edition
- Author: Jacques Minkus (originally)
- Media type: Catalogue

The Minkus catalogue was a comprehensive of American and worldwide postage stamps, edited by George A Tlamsa and published by Krause Publications. In the United States Minkus competed with the Scott catalogue as a distant second. Generally sold through department store stamp collecting departments, it had its own system of numbering stamps which was used in its catalogues and stamp albums; Scott's numbering system is proprietary. The Minkus catalogue and numbering system was acquired by Amos Press in 2004 and no further editions were published. The last US catalog was the 2004 Krause-Minkus Standard Catalog of U.S. Stamps.

The Minkus catalogues had more extensive information about the subjects of stamps, a short paragraph about the subject portrayed on the stamp, than the Scott catalogue, which has only a name or brief sentence.

As late as 1974 a two-volume hardbound Minkus New World-Wide Postage Stamp Catalog was published, Volume 1 covering the United States and the British Commonwealth ran to 2004 pages in 1974, Volume 2, covering Europe and the rest of the world was slightly smaller, running to 1292 pages in 1973.

A Change in Catalog Format. Beginning with the 1977-78 Minkus New World-Wide Postage Stamp Catalog editions, a significant change in format took place. Since 1956, the catalogue had been produced as two-book set: Volume I & II were combined as one book and catalogued stamps of the United States, the Americas, Great Britain, British Commonwealth, and Independent Nations of Asia and Africa, while Volume III (one book) covered the stamps of Europe and Colonies. As the decades wore on, those two books great larger and larger as more stamp listings were added annually. The editors of the Minkus World-Wide Postage Stamp Catalog decided it was time to split up the volumes further. Beginning in 1977, and reaching completion in 1979, a new format for the catalog was rolled out under the new name "Minkus New World Wide Stamp Catalog," with the Volumes organized as follows:

Volume I, Part I: British Commonwealth and Ireland (800 pages); 1977-78)

Volume I, Part II: Free Asia and Africa (832 pages; 1977-78)

Volume I, Part III: Latin America (688 pages; 1977-78)

Volume II, Part I: Europe and Colonies [Albania to Hungary] (1128 pages; 1978-79)

Volume II, Part II: Europe and Colonies [Iceland to Yugoslavia] (1018 pages; 1978-79)

Omitted from these five books was any listing of stamps from the United States; those listings were now relegated exclusively to Minkus' New American Stamp Catalog (which had been produced annually since 1954).

The End of the World Wide Catalog. The newly crafted five-book World Wide Stamp Catalog saw only one more iteration -- in 1980, an updated Volume I, Parts I, II, and III, were issued at 872 pages, 874 pages and 714 pages respectively. No further Europe and Colonies editions were published. Beginning in 1981, the Minkus company returned to a format it had flirted with over the previous 20 years: single-country or single-region catalogs, which continued until about 1984. By that point in time, Minkus had discontinued its entire catalog series (with the exception of one United States Catalog issued in 1988), its publication Minkus Stamp and Coin Journal, and most of its once overwhelming retail space in American department store, with only a few Minkus counter locations remaining open.

1998-2004: A Brief Revival. In the late 1990s, following Minkus' late 1980s sale to Novus Debut, Inc., Minkus found itself sold to the Krause Company. Thereafter Minkus products was ascribe the prefix "Krause-Minkus." With that sale, Minkus once again began to dabble in the catalog market. Issues during this era, until the full and final demise of Minkus, were the following:

The Krause-Minkus Catalog of U.S. Stamps (1998-2004; 1st through 7th editions)

Krause-Minkus Standard Catalog of Canadian & United Nations Stamps (1999-2001)

Krause-Minkus Standard Catalog of Australia Stamps (2001)

Krause-Minkus Standard Catalog of Israel Stamps (2001)

Krause-Minkus Standard Catalog of Great Britain Stamps (2001)

Krause-Minkus Standard Catalog of Italy (2001)

The Aftermath. Minkus albums, issued since the 1950s (including the Supreme Global Stamp Album and Master Global Stamp Album, both comprehensive worldwide albums; individual country albums; and albums for American collectors) had utilized catalog numbers from the Minkus World Wide Stamp Catalog. However in 2004, when the Krause company divested its Minkus line, Amos Advantage bought the rights to Minkus and its catalogs and albums. As Amos Advantage was the primary distributor for Minkus' long time rival Scott Publications known for its stamp catalogs and proprietary numbering system, Minkus catalogs ceased production. However, Minkus Global series of albums and annual supplements to most of Minkus' albums continued to be released by Amos Advantage, but its catalogs are no longer stocked or produced.

== See also ==
- Jacques Minkus
- List of stamp catalogues
