= Society for the Suppression of Speculative Stamps =

The Society for the Suppression of Speculative Stamps (S.S.S.S.) was a short-lived and ill-fated attempt by philatelists before 1900 to suppress the issue of stamps designed mainly for sale to collectors.

The society was formed on 6 May 1895 and lasted until about 1897 when it broke up due to the failure of dealers and collectors within its ranks to boycott speculative issues.

The society was supported by the Royal Philatelic Society London and the American Philatelic Society.

== Examples of society publications ==
- The Society for the Suppression of Speculative Stamps. The Post Office, 1895, Vol. V, No. 53, p. 59.
- The Society for the Suppression of Speculative Stamps. St. Martin's-le-Grand, F. J. Beckley (ed.), 1895, Vol. V, No. 20, pp. 478–479.

== See also ==
- Commemorative stamp
- Illegal stamps
