= Oscar Berger-Levrault =

French philatelist (1826 - 1903)

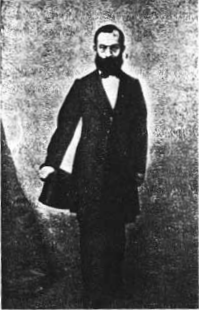
Oscar Berger-Levrault

Oscar François George Berger-Levrault (9 May 1826 in Strasbourg – 24 September 1903 in Nancy) was a French philatelist. The invention of the stamp catalogue is attributed to him and to the Englishman, John Edward Gray.

== Life ==
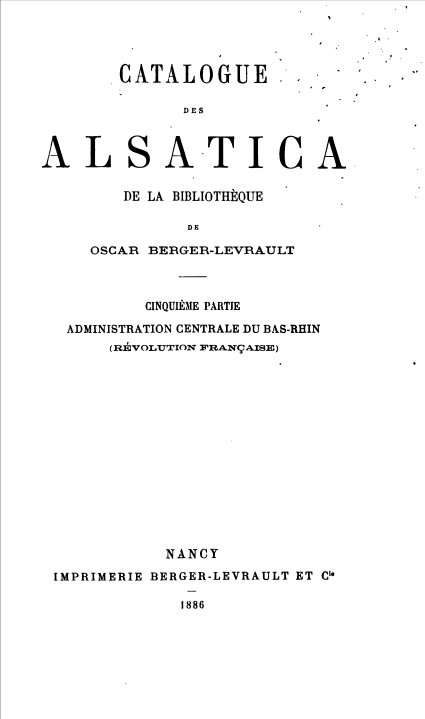
"Alsatica" catalogue issued by Oscar Berger-Levrault (Nancy, 1886).

Oscar Berger-Levrault was a bookseller in his birthplace, Strasbourg. Besides his work, he found the time to engage in philately. He was one of the first stamp collectors, who dealt with the scientific and systematic establishment of stamp collections. In the course of his philatelic work, he published a stamp and postal stationery register ("Description of the stamps known to date") on 17 September 1861, which can definitely be referred to as the world's first stamp catalogue, although it was rather a list than a catalogue because of the complete lack of illustrations. However, it listed all of the 973 postage stamps known to the bookseller which had been issued around the world up to then.

Because Berger-Levrault was the first to make such a list, errors had crept in. It was used by Alfred Potiquet as a template for the first illustrated stamp catalogue issued in December 1861.

Although Berger-Levrault's philatelic work was only intended for his friends and only 40 to 50 copies of the catalogue were produced, one copy found its way into the library of the British Museum, now the British Library in London, where it can be found today.

== Catalogues issued ==
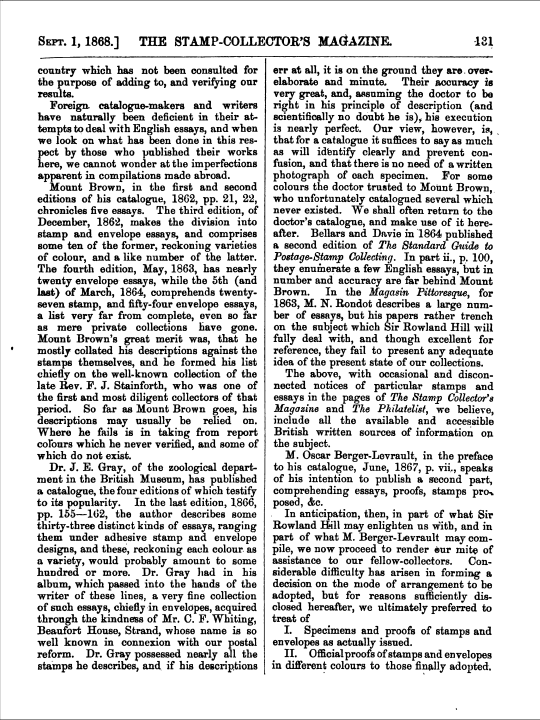
A page of the philatelic magazine, "Stamp Collector's Magazine" (London, 1868), describing the stamp catalogue issued by Berger-Levreault in June, 1867.

- Berger-Levrault O. Timbres-poste. — Strasbourg : Ve. Berger-Levrault & fils, 1861. — 12 p.
- Les timbres-poste: catalogue méthodique et descriptif de tous les timbres-poste connus. — Paris : Ve. Berger-Levrault et fils, 1867. — xiii, 147 p.

== Sources ==
- Häger, Ullrich: Großes Lexikon der Philatelie, Gütersloh et al.: Bertelsmann Lexikon 1973. (In German)
