= Stanley Gibbons catalogue =

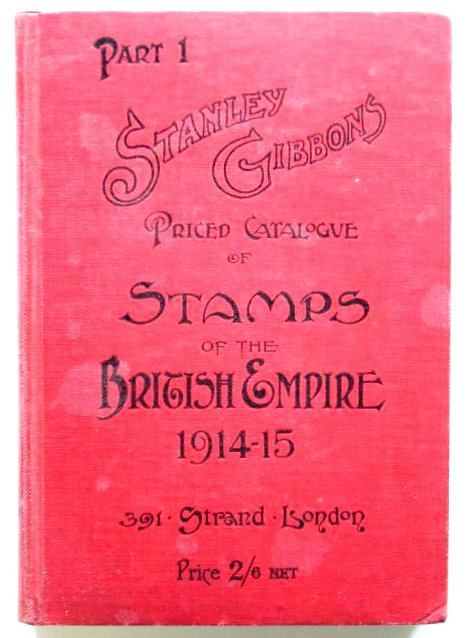
The cover of a 1914-15 edition of the "Part One" British Commonwealth catalogue.

The first Stanley Gibbons stamp catalogue was a penny price list issued in November 1865 and reissued at monthly intervals for the next 14 years. The company produces numerous catalogues covering different countries, regions and specialisms; many of them are reissued annually. The catalogues list all known adhesive postage stamp issues and include prices for used and unused stamps.

== Stamp prices ==
Unlike other dealers' catalogues, Stanley Gibbons state that their catalogue is a retail price list. In other words, if they had that exact stamp in stock in the exact condition specified, the current catalogue price is the price that they would charge for it. This contrasts with most other catalogues which are produced by firms that do not sell stamps and therefore base their pricing on an average of market values in the country where the catalogue is published. In practice, the actual price charged by Stanley Gibbons for an individual stamp may be different from the catalogue price because the specimen for sale is of a different grade, the market conditions have changed since the catalogue was produced, the firm has a plentiful or restricted supply of that stamp, or for a variety of other reasons.

== Catalogue range ==
The range includes the following catalogues:

- Simplified Catalogues
  - Stamps of the World. (An annual catalogue, first published in 1934, now in six volumes listing stamps from every country in the world.) and its regional subsets:
  - Africa, 1st edition (2010)
  - Asia Volume 1, 1st edition (2010)
  - Commonwealth, 5th edition (2013)
  - Western Europe, 2nd edition (2012)
- Regional Catalogues
  - Antarctica, 2nd edition (2012)
  - North America, 1st edition (2010)
  - North-East Africa, 2nd edition (2017)
  - United Nations, 1st edition (2010)
- Comprehensive Catalogues
  - Commonwealth & British Empire Stamps, 1840-1970. (This annual lists stamps from 1840 only till 1970. Sometimes known as 'Part 1'.) Also, its chronological subsets:
  - King George V Stamp Catalogue, 1st edition (2010)
  - King George VI Stamp Catalogue, 9th edition (2018)
  - Elizabethan Specialised Catalogue of Modern British Commonwealth Stamps, 21st edition (1985)
- Individual standard catalogues for Commonwealth countries. (The same content as Part 1 but up to date.)
  - Australia, 12th edition (2022). A concise edition was published in 1989.
  - Bangladesh, Burma, Pakistan & Sri Lanka, 3rd edition (2015)
  - Belize, Guyana, Trinidad and Tobago, 1st edition (2009)
  - Brunei, Malaysia & Singapore, 6th edition (2025)
  - Canada & Provinces, 8th edition (2024)
  - Central Africa, 3rd edition (2025)
  - Cyprus, Gibraltar & Malta, 6th edition (2023)
  - East Africa with Egypt and Sudan, 4th edition (2018)
  - Eastern Pacific (including Cook Islands, Aitutaki, Penrhyn Island, Niue, Pitcairn Islands and Samoa), 3rd edition (2015)
  - Falkland Islands & Dependencies, 9th edition (2024). Also, Collect Falkland Islands Stamps, a checklist (2001)
  - Hong Kong, 7th edition (2025)
  - India (including Convention and Feudatory States), 6th edition (2023)
  - Indian Ocean, 4th edition (2022)
  - Ireland, 8th edition (2024). Also, Collect Irish Stamps, a checklist (1999)
  - Leeward Islands, 3rd edition (2017)
  - New Zealand and Dependencies, 8th edition (2025). A concise edition was published in 1990.
  - Northern Caribbean, Bahamas & Bermuda, 4th edition (2016)
  - St. Helena, Ascension & Tristan da Cunha, 6th edition (2017)
  - Southern Africa, 3rd edition (2026)
  - West Africa, 2nd edition (2012)
  - Western Pacific, 4th edition (2016)
  - Windward Islands and Barbados, 3rd edition (2015)
- Individual standard catalogues for Foreign (non-Commonwealth) countries (New Series).
  - Arabia, 2nd edition (2026)
  - Belgium and Luxembourg (Including Belgian Congo and Colonies) (2015)
  - China (including Hong Kong, Macau and Taiwan), 12th edition (2019)
  - Czech Republic and Slovakia (including Czechoslovakia) (2016)
  - Denmark and Norway (also includes Faröe Islands, Greenland and Iceland) (2018)
  - Finland and Sweden (including Aland Islands) (2016)
  - France (also covering Andorra and Monaco) 2nd Edition (2023)
  - French Colonies (2016)
  - Germany, 13th edition (2022)
  - Italy and Colonies (2022)
  - Middle East (2018)
  - Netherlands and Colonies (2016)
  - Poland, 2nd edition (2023)
  - Portugal and Colonies (2022)
  - Southern Balkans (Albania, Bulgaria, Greece and Macedonia) (2019)
  - Spain and Colonies (2019)
  - Switzerland inc. Liechtenstein and United Nations (Geneva Headquarters) (2019)
- Individual standard catalogues for Foreign (non-Commonwealth) countries (Old Series).
  - Part 2 Austria & Hungary, 8th edition (2014)
  - Part 3 Balkans, 5th edition (2009)
  - Part 10 Russia, 7th edition (2014)
  - Part 12 Africa since Independence A-E, 2nd edition (1983)
  - Part 13 Africa since Independence F-M, 1st edition (1981)
  - Part 14 Africa since Independence N-Z, 1st edition (1981)
  - Part 15 Central America, 3rd edition (2007)
  - Part 16 Central Asia, 4th edition (2006)
  - Part 18 Japan & Korea, 5th edition (2008)
  - Part 20 South America, 4th edition (2008)
  - Part 21 South East Asia, 5th edition (2012)
  - Part 22 United States, 8th edition (2015)
- Thematic Catalogues
  - Collect Aircraft On Stamps, 2nd edition (2009)
  - Collect Birds On Stamps, 4th edition (1996)
  - Collect Butterflies and other Insects On Stamps, 1st edition (1991)
  - Collect Chess On Stamps, 2nd edition (1999)
  - Collect Fish On Stamps, 1st edition (1999)
  - Collect Fungi On Stamps, 2nd edition (1997)
  - Collect Mammals On Stamps, 1st edition (1986)
  - Collect Motor Vehicles On Stamps, 1st edition (2004)
  - Collect Railways On Stamps, 3rd edition (1999)
  - Collect Shells On Stamps, 1st edition (1995)
  - Collect Ships On Stamps, 3rd edition (2001)
- Great Britain Catalogues
  - Collect British Stamps. Also Collect Channel Islands and Isle of Man Stamps. (Simple colour catalogues - Annual.)
  - The Great Britain Concise catalogue. (Intermediate level of detail - Annual.)
- The Great Britain specialised catalogues, comprising:
  - Vol. 1 Queen Victoria: Part 1, published in 2020
  - Vol. 2 King Edward VII to King George VI (14th Edition), published in May 2015
  - Vol. 3 Queen Elizabeth II Pre-Decimal Issues (13th Edition), published in 2019
  - Vol. 4 Queen Elizabeth Decimal Definitive Issues Part 1 (10th Edition), published in April 2008
  - Vol. 4 Queen Elizabeth Decimal Definitive Issues Part 2 (10th Edition), published in April 2010
  - Vol. 5 Queen Elizabeth Decimal Special Issues (13th Edition), published in February 1998 with two loose-leaf supplements in 2000 and 2002
  - Channel Islands Specialised Catalogue of Stamps and Postal History, 2nd edition (1983)
  - Collect British Postmarks, 9th edition (2013)

All are based on the same numbering system drawn from 'Stamps of the World', apart from the British specialised catalogues which have their own numbering system.
