= Frederick Booty =

English artist and author (1841–1924)

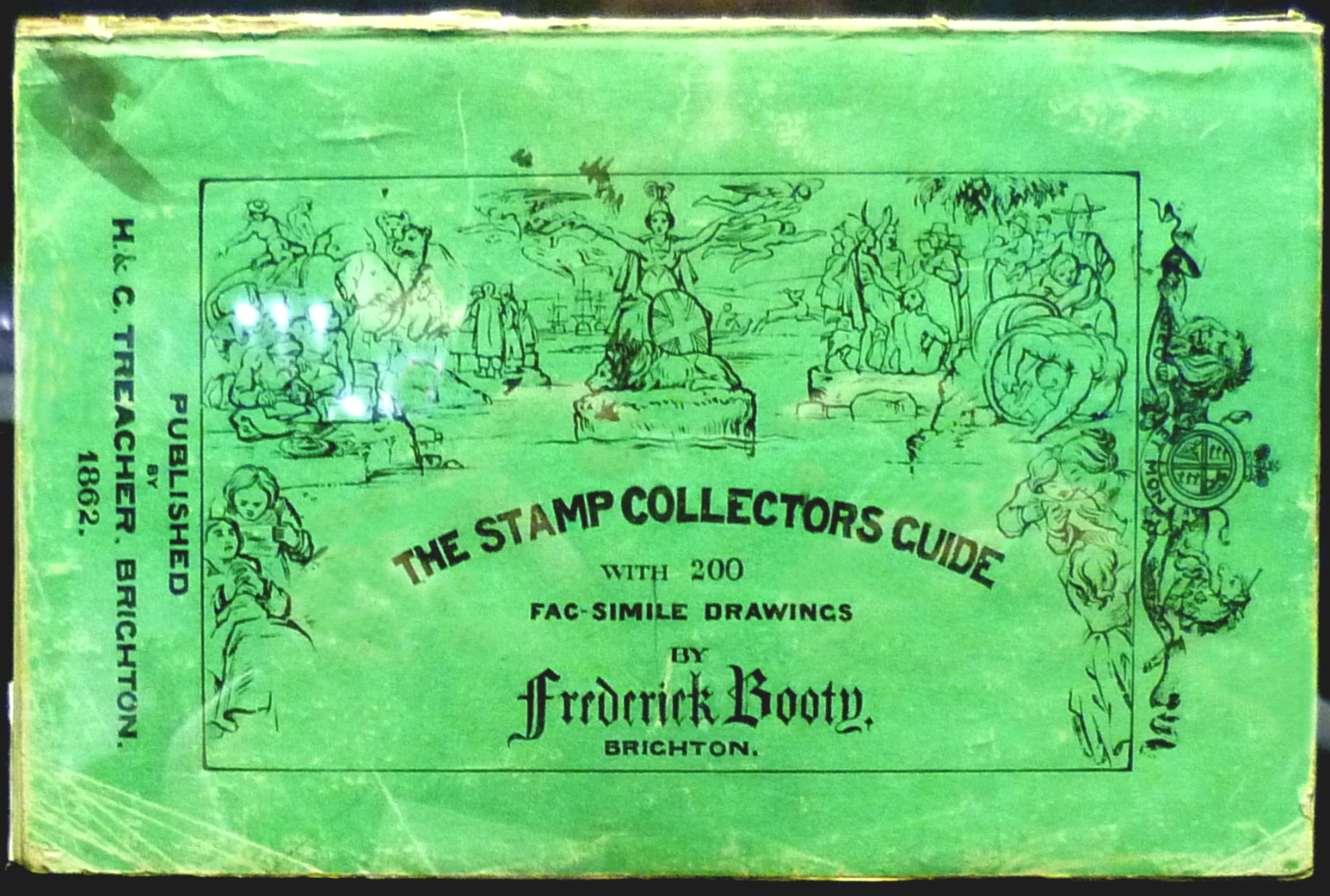
The cover of Booty's first illustrated stamp catalogue.

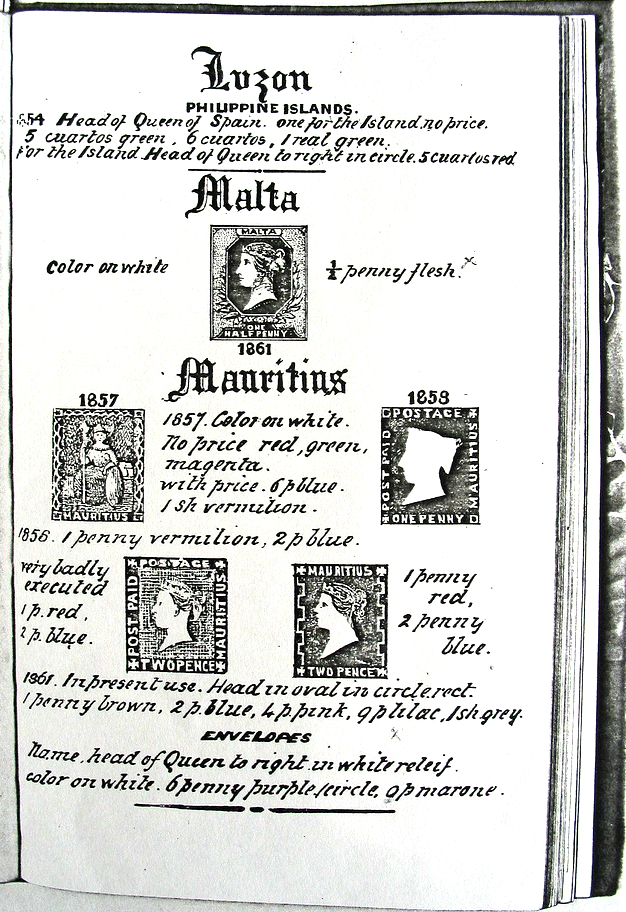
A hand-drawn page from Booty's catalogue showing early Malta and Mauritius stamps but not the famous Mauritius "Post Office"

Frederick William Booty (1841 – 13 October 1924) was an English artist who was also the author of the first postage stamp catalogue in English, and the first illustrated stamp catalogue anywhere.

== Education ==
Booty was born in Brighton, Sussex, the son of Edward and Fanny Booty. He later worked as an art professor in Yorkshire.

== Stamp catalogues ==
Booty's Aids to Stamp Collectors, being a list of British and Foreign Postage Stamps in Circulation since 1840 - by a Stamp Collector, was published in April 1862, just weeks before Mount Brown issued his more successful work, and when Booty was in his early twenties. The catalogue was partly based on earlier works produced in Belgium and France.

Later in 1862, Booty was also the first to issue an illustrated catalogue, titled The Stamp Collector’s Guide; being a list of English and Foreign Postage Stamps, with 200 fac-simile drawings. This edition listed 1100 stamps and Booty drew all of the illustrations himself. He reportedly used half a million stamps to compile the catalogue.

Booty also contributed to the Monthly Advertiser, published by Edward Moore & Co., in 1862.

These catalogues appear to have been a business venture, capitalising on Booty's artistic skills, as there is no evidence that Booty was a philatelist.

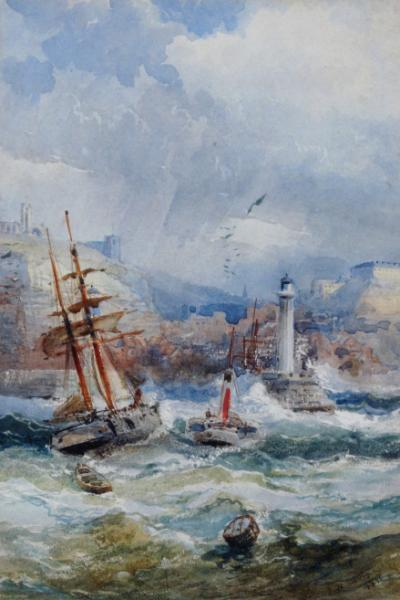
"Whitby", a watercolour painting by Frederick Booty from 1886.

== Art ==
Booty's watercolour landscape pictures are still regularly featured in art auctions in Britain. Although originally based in Brighton, his later work is mainly of scenes from Yorkshire, including Hull and the ports of Scarborough and Whitby. Harbour scenes were a popular subject with Booty. He also painted Yorkshire panoramas and the peacocks at Haddon Hall, Derbyshire.

== See also ==
- Alfred Potiquet Author of the world's first illustrated stamp catalogue published 1861.

== Publications ==
- Aids to Stamp Collectors, being a list of British and Foreign Postage Stamps in Circulation since 1840 - by a Stamp Collector. 1st edition, H.& C. Treacher, Brighton, April 1862. (2nd edition 1862)
- The Stamp Collector’s Guide; being a list of English and Foreign Postage Stamps, with 200 fac-simile drawings. 1st edition, H. & C. Treacher, Brighton, & Hamilton, Adams & Co., London, 1862.
