= Theresa Mathilde Clark =

- Born: October 30, 1884; Brooklyn, New York, US
- Died: December 22, 1953 (aged 67); San Diego, California, US
- Occupation: Philatelist
- Organization: American Stamp Dealers Association
- Known for: Bought Scott Stamp and Coin Company in 1935 with her husband
- Notable work: 1935 & 1936 Scott catalog
- Spouse: Hugh Massey Clark
- Awards: APS Hall of Fame

Theresa Mathilde Clark (née Scheidemantle; October 30, 1884 – December 22, 1953) of New York City, was a philatelist and philatelic editor. She was the wife of Hugh Massey Clark, with whom she purchased the Scott Stamp and Coin Company in 1935.

== Early life and family ==
Clark was born in Brooklyn, New York to German-American parents. Her father, Rudolph, fought in the Civil War.

== Philatelic activity ==
In about 1908, Theresa Clark joined the Scott Stamp and Coin Company and served in various positions with the firm until 1946. While working at Scott's, she met Hugh Massey Clark and the two eventually married. They both were co-editors of the 1935 and 1936 issues of the Scott Standard Postage Stamp Catalogue. Theresa also, while at Scott, was the editor of The Chronicle of New Issues.

== Purchase of Scott's ==
In 1938 Theresa and Hugh Clark purchased the Scott Stamp and Coin Company and renamed it Scott Publications. They eventually sold the firm to Gordon R. Harmer in 1946.

== Honors and awards ==
Theresa Clark was named to the American Philatelic Society Hall of Fame in 1954.

== See also ==
- Stamp collecting
- Scott catalog
- Philatelic literature
