= Alfred Potiquet =

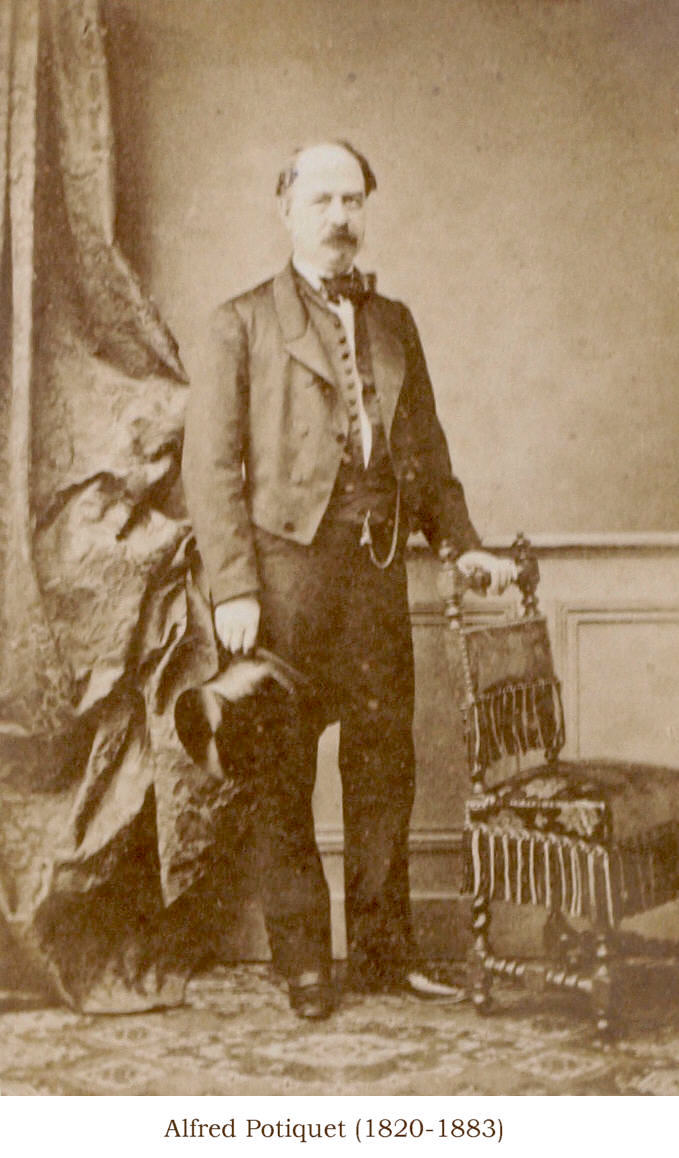
Alfred Potiquet

François-Gabriel-Alfred Potiquet (4 December 1820 – 9 April 1883) was a French official who was responsible for the first stamp catalogue in the world. The 1861 first edition is held by the Royal Philatelic Society London.

Alfred Potiquet developed his catalogue on the basis of the postage stamp and postal stationery register of the Strasbourg bookseller, Oscar Berger-Levrault. In fact, that register is referred to as the world's first stamp catalogue, although it was not intended for the public. Potiquet added a lot of stamp issues which had been overlooked by Oscar Berger-Levrault and corrected his errors.

His work was published in December 1861 in Paris under the title, "Catalogue des timbres-poste crées dans les divers états du globe". It already contained 1080 postage stamps and 132 postal stationeries. This much improved stamp catalogue was still not error-free. For example, there was no information about stamps which were still unknown at that time, such as the "Post Office" stamps of Mauritius.

Besides these stamp catalogues of Oscar Berger-Levrault and Alfred Potiquet, there was a similar work made in parallel in England by John Edward Gray.

== Selected editions ==
- Potiquet, Alfred (1876). Jean-Baptiste Santerre, peintre: sa vie et son oeuvre (in French). Magny-en-Vexin: Petit.
  - Potiquet, Alfred (1878) [1876]. Jean-Baptiste Santerre, peintre: sa vie et son oeuvre (in French) (2nd ed.). Magny-en-Vexin: Petit. OCLC 458077934.

== See also ==
- Frederick Booty, author of the first illustrated stamp catalogue in English.
