= Sakura catalog =

Japanese stamp catalog

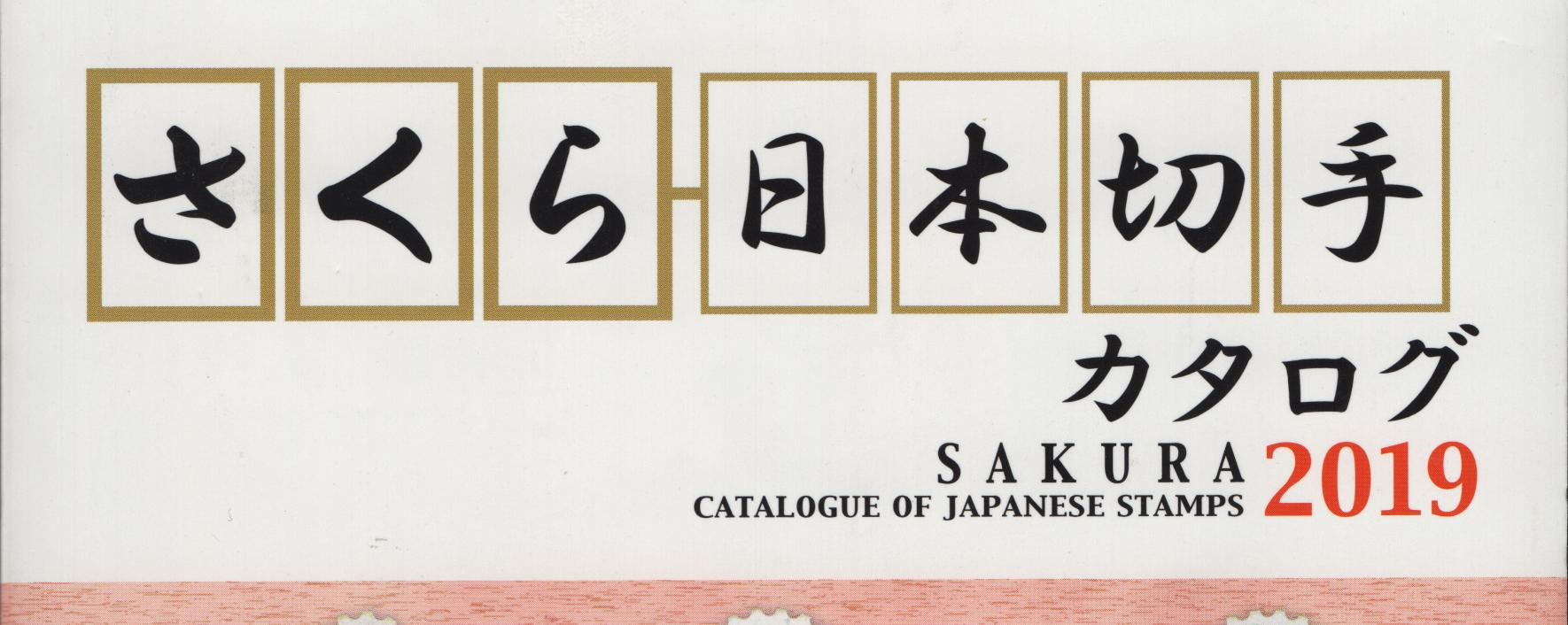
The cover top of the Sakura stamp catalog 2019 (2018.4.20)

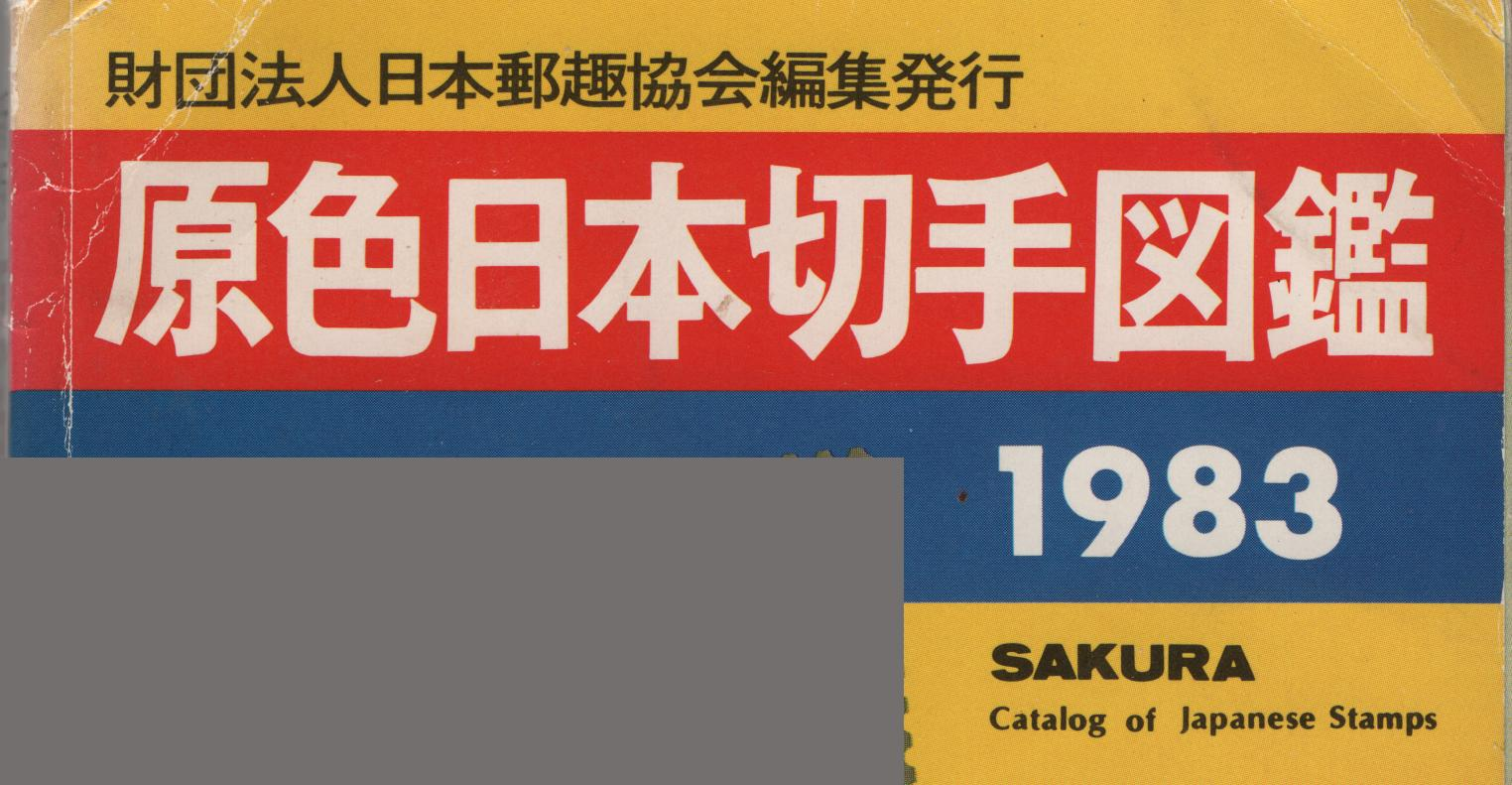
The cover top of the Sakura stamp catalog 1983 (1982.9.5)

The Sakura catalog is an illustrated full-color Japanese stamp catalog.

The Japanese Stamp Catalog Illustrated in Colors (Japanese: 原色日本切手図鑑, romanized: genshoku-Nippon-kitte-zukan) (now Sakura Catalogue of Japanese Stamps (Japanese: さくら日本切手カタログ, romanized: sakura-Nippon-kitte-katarogu)) was first published in October 1967 with full-color illustrations, which surprised the philatelic world since a colored stamp catalog had never been thought of. Regarded as the most reliable and popular publication in Japan, it goes through fifteen editions in 1979, and more than 4,500,000 copies have been released in all. This is the companion volume to the Japanese Stamp Specialized Catalog. The catalog, nicknamed Sakura Catalog, has been in pocket-size (118 × 148 mm) for several years, but now it is printed in B6 (128 × 182 mm) size so that it can be printed using a multicolor rotary press to meet the increased circulation and to make the use of thinner paper possible. As all pages have to be composed anew for the enlarged size, English version of stamp names is added for the convenience of foreign collectors, and many symbols are used to facilitate their understanding how the stamps are classified here.

Please see the contents of the SAKURA Catalogue of Japanese Stamps 2019 and other editions.

== Most recently published catalog structure ==
The structure of the most recently published catalog is as follows:

=== Catalogue information and contents ===
Catalogue Information & Contents (Japanese: さくら日本切手カタログの使い方・目次)

- Catalogue Contents in Japan (Japanese: 目次)
- Catalogue Information in Japan (Japanese: さくら日本切手カタログの使い方)
- Catalogue Information for Users in English
- [Brief] Contents in English

=== Commemorative stamps (Japanese: 記念・特殊切手) ===
==== Pre-War Issues (Japanese: 戦前の記念・特殊切手) ====
- Unissued (Japanese: 不発行切手)

==== Post-War Issues (Japanese: 戦後（1946年以降発行）の記念・特殊切手) ====
- 1st Men of Culture Series (Japanese: 1949–52（昭和24–27）第1次文化人切手 全18集)
- Tourist Series (Japanese: 1951–53（昭和26–28）観光地 百選切手 全10集)
- Flower Series (Japanese: 1961(昭和36) 花 シリーズ切手 全12集)
- Tokyo Olympic Games (Japanese: 1961–64（昭和36–39）オリンピック 東京大会募金 全6集)
- Season's Folklore Series (Japanese: 1962–63（昭和37–38）年中行事シリーズ 全4集)
- Bird Series (Japanese: 1963–64（昭和38–39）鳥シリーズ 全6集)
- Festival Series (Japanese: 1964–65（昭和39–40）お祭りシリーズ 全6集)
- Fish Series (Japanese: 1966–67（昭和41–42）魚介シリーズ 全12集)
- Famous Gardens Series (Japanese: 1966–67（昭和41–42）名園シリーズ 全3集)
- 1st National Treasure Series (Japanese: 1967–69（昭和42–44）第1次国宝シリーズ 全7集)
- Classic Art Series (Japanese: 1970–72（昭和45–47）古典芸能シリーズ 全4集)
- Folk Tale Series (Japanese: 1973–75（昭和48–50）昔ばなしシリーズ 全7集)
- Nature Conservation Series (Japanese: 1974–78（昭和49–53）自然 保護シリーズ 全5集)
- Steam locomotive Series (Japanese: 1974–75（昭和49–50）SLシリーズ 全5集)
- Ship Series (Japanese: 1975–76（昭和50–51）船シリーズ 全6集)
- 2nd National Treasure Series (Japanese: 1976–78（昭和51–53）第2次国宝シリーズ 全8集)
- "Sumo" Ukiyoe (Picture) Series (Japanese: 1978–79（昭和53–54）相撲 絵シリーズ 全5集)
- Modern art Series (Japanese: 1979–83（昭和54–58）近代 美術シリーズ 全16集)
- Japanese Song Series (Japanese: 1979–81（昭和54–56）日本の歌シリーズ 全9集)
- Modern Western-Style Architecture Series (Japanese: 1981–84（昭和56–59）近代洋風建築シリーズ 全10集)
- Endangered Native Bird Series (Japanese: 1983–84（昭和58–59）特殊鳥類シリーズ 全5集)
- Alpine plant Series (Japanese: 1984–86（昭和59–61）高山植物シリーズ 全7集)
- 1st Traditional Arts and Crafts Series (Japanese: 1984–86（昭和59–61）第1次伝統的工芸品シリーズ 全7集)
- Insect Series (Japanese: 1986–87（昭和61–62）昆虫シリーズ 全5集)
- Oku no Hosomichi (Matsuo Basho's Diary) Series (Japanese: 1987–89（昭和62-平成1）奥の細道シリーズ 全10集)
- 3rd National Treasure Series (Japanese: 1987–89（昭和62-平成1）第3次国宝シリーズ 全8集)
- Electric locomotive Series (Japanese: 1990（平成2）電気機関車シリーズ 全5集)
- Horse Series (Japanese: 1990–91（平成2–3）馬と文化シリーズ 全5集)
- Kabuki Series (Japanese: 1991–92（平成3–4）歌舞伎シリーズ 全6集)
- Water Side Birds Series (Japanese: 1991–93（平成3–5）水辺の鳥シリーズ 全8集)
- 2nd Men of Culture Series (Japanese: 1992–2004（平成4–16）第2次文化人切手 全13集)
- Flowers of Four Seasons Series (Japanese: 1993–94（平成5–6）四季の花シリーズ 全4集)
- History of Japanese Stamp Series (Japanese: 1994–96（平成6–8）郵便切手の歩みシリーズ 全6集)
- 1st World Heritage Series (Japanese: 1994–95（平成6–7）第1次世界遺産シリーズ 全4集)
- 50 Postwar Memorable Years Series (Japanese: 1996–97（平成8–9）戦後50年 メモリアルシリーズ 全5集)
- My Favorite Song Series (Japanese: 1997–99（平成9-11）わたしの愛 唱 歌シリーズ 全9集)
- Traditional Japanese House Series (Japanese: 1997–99（平成9-11）日本の民家シリーズ 全5集)
- 20th Century Series (Japanese: 1999–2000（平成11–12）20世紀シリーズ 全17集)
- 2nd World Heritage Series (Japanese: 2001–03（平成13–15）第2次世界遺産シリーズ 全11集)

[Published by Japan Post] (Japanese: 日本郵政公社 発行)
- The 400th Anniversary of the Edo Shogunate (Japanese: 2003（平成15）江戸開府400年シリーズ 全3集)
- Science and Technology and Animation Series (Japanese: 2005–13（平成17–25）科学技術とアニメ・ヒーロー・ヒロインシリーズ 全7集)
- Animation Hero and Heroine Series (Japanese: 2005–13（平成17–25）アニメ・ヒーロー・ヒロインシリーズ 全20集)
- 3rd World Heritage Series (Japanese: 2006–（平成18-）第3次世界遺産シリーズ)
[Published by Japan Post Service] (Japanese: 郵便事業株式会社 発行)
- The Constellation Series (Japanese: 2011–13（平成23–25）星座シリーズ 全4集)
- Harmony with Nature Series (Japanese: 2011–14（平成23–26）自然との共生シリーズ 全4集)
- Japanese Mountains Series (Japanese: 2011–15（平成23–27）日本の山岳シリーズ 全6集)
- Evocative Memory of Seasons Series (Japanese: 2012–14（平成24–26）季節のおもいでシリーズ 全4集)
- Ukiyoe Series (Japanese: 2012–17（平成24–29）浮世絵シリーズ 全6集)
- 2nd Japanese Traditional Craft Series (Japanese: 2012–16（平成24–28）第2次伝統的工芸品シリーズ 全5集)
- Overseas World Heritage Series (Japanese: 2013–15（平成25–27）海外の世界遺産シリーズ 全5集)
- Vegetable & Fruits Series (Japanese: 2013–16（平成25–28）野菜とくだものシリーズ 全6集)
- Heartwarming Animal Scene Series (Japanese: 2013–15（平成25–27）ほっとする動物 全3集)
- Railroad Series (Japanese: 2013–（平成25-）鉄道)
- Japanese Castle Series (Japanese: 2013–16（平成25–28）日本の城シリーズ 全6集)
- "Omotenashi" (Hospitality) Flowers Series (Japanese: 2014–（平成26-）おもてなしの花シリーズ)
- Tales from Stars Series (Japanese: 2014–17（平成26–29）星の物語シリーズ 全5集)
- The Treasures of the Shoso-in Series (Japanese: 2014–16（平成26–28）正倉院の宝物シリーズ 全3集)
- Nostalgia of Pictures for Children Series (Japanese: 2015–16（平成27–28）童 画のノスタルジーシリーズ 全4集)
- Familiar Animal Series (Japanese: 2015–18（平成27–30）身近な動物シリーズ 全5集)
- Traditional Dietary Culture of Japan Series (Japanese: 2015–（平成27-）和の食 文化シリーズ)
- Japanese Night View Series (Japanese: 2015–（平成27-）日本の食景シリーズ)
- Japanese Architecture Series (Japanese: 2016–18（平成28–30）日本の建築シリーズ 全3集)
- Traditional Japanese Design Series (Japanese: 2016–18（平成28–30）和の文様シリーズ 全4集)
- My Journey Stamps Series (Japanese: 2016–（平成28-）My旅シリーズ)
- Natural monument Series (Japanese: 2016–（平成28-）天然記念物シリーズ)
- Sea Life Series (Japanese: 2017–（平成29-）海のいきものシリーズ)
- Japanese Traditional Color Series (Japanese: 2017–（平成29-）伝統 色シリーズ)
- Gifts from the Forest Series (Japanese: 2017–（平成29-）森の贈リものシリーズ)
- The World of Children's Picture Book Series (Japanese: 2017–（平成29-）絵本の世界シリーズ)
- Astronomical World Series (Japanese: 2018–（平成30-）天体シリーズ)

=== Greetings Stamps (Japanese: グリーティング 切手) ===
[Published by Japan Post] (Japanese: 日本郵政公社 発行)
- Chinese zodiac Sign Series (Japanese: 2004–2015（平成16–27）干支 文字切手 全12集)
[Published by Japan Post Service] (Japanese: 郵便事業株式会社 発行)
[Published by Japan Post Co., Ltd.] (Japanese: 日本郵便株式会社 発行)
- [Hello Kitty (regional version)] (Japanese: 2015（平成27）グリーティングハローキティ（地方版）)

=== Furusato Stamps (Prefectural Issues) (Japanese: ふるさと切手) ===
- Prefectural Flowers (Japanese: 1990（平成2）.4.27. 47都道府県の花)

[Published by Japan Post] (Japanese: 日本郵政公社 発行)
[Published by Japan Post Service] (Japanese: 郵便事業株式会社 発行)
- Hometowns-Scenes in My Heart Series (Japanese: 2008–11（平成20–23）ふるさと 心の風景 全10集)
- Flowers of the Hometown Series (Japanese: 2008–11（平成20–23）ふるさとの花 全10集)
- 60th Anniversary of Local Government Law (Japanese: 2008–16（平成20–28）地方自治法施行60周年シリーズ 全47集)
- Festivals of the Hometown Series (Japanese: 2008–13（平成20–25）ふるさとの祭シリーズ 全10集)
- Travel Scenes Series (Japanese: 2008–13（平成20–25）旅の風景シリーズ 全18集)
- Seasonal Flowers Series (Japanese: 2011–13（平成23–25）季節の花シリーズ 全8集)
- Afforestation [(Greening)] (Japanese: 2008–（平成20-）国土 緑化)
- Edo famous places and neat Ukiyoe Series (Japanese: 2007–11（平成19–23）江戸 名所と粋の浮世絵シリーズ 全5集)
- National Athletic Meets (Japanese: 2008–（平成20-）国民 体育 大会)
- [Furusato Stamps (Prefectural Issue), except the series] (Japanese: シリーズ以外のふるさと切手)

=== National Park Stamps (Japanese: 公園切手) ===
- 1st National Park Series (Japanese: 1936–56（昭和11–31）第1次国立公園切手)
- 2nd National Park Series (Japanese: 1962–74（昭和37–49）第2次国立公園切手)
- Quasi-national park Series (Japanese: 1958–73（昭和33–48）国定公園切手)

=== New Year's Greeting Stamps (Japanese: 年賀切手) ===
[Published by Japan Post] (Japanese: 日本郵政公社 発行)
[Published by Japan Post Service] (Japanese: 郵便事業株式会社 発行)
[Published by Japan Post Co., Ltd.] (Japanese: 日本郵便株式会社 発行)

=== Definitives (Japanese: 普通切手) ===
- Etched Stamps (Japanese: 1871–76（明治4–9）手彫切手)
  - I Dragon Series (Japanese: I. 龍切手)
  - II Cherry Blossom Series, Native Paper (Japanese: II. 桜切手(和紙))
  - III Cherry Blossom Series, Transitional Period (Japanese: III. 桜切手(過渡期))
  - IV Cherry Blossom Series, Foreign Paper (Japanese: IV. 桜切手(洋紙))
  - V Bird Stamps (Japanese: V. 鳥切手)
  - VI Cherry Blossom Series, Changed Colors (Japanese: VI. 桜切手(改色))
  - VII Cherry Blossom Series, Changed Designs (Japanese: VII. 桜切手(図案改正))
- Koban Series (Japanese: 1876–92（明治9–25）小判 切手)
- Chrysanthemum Series (Japanese: 1899–1907（明治32–40）菊切手)
- Old High Value Issues (Japanese: 1908–14（明治41-大正3）旧高額切手)
- Tazawa Series (Japanese: 1913–38（大正2-昭和13）田沢型切手)
- Mt. Fuji & Deer Series (Japanese: 1922–37（大正11-昭和12）富士 鹿切手)
- Earthquake Emergency Issue (Japanese: 1923（大正12）震災切手)
- New High Value Issue (Japanese: 1924–37（大正13-昭和12）新高額切手)
- Scenery Series (Japanese: 1926–37（大正15-昭和12）風景切手)
- Showa Stamps (Japanese: 1937–46（昭和12–21）昭和切手)
- Taiwan Local Issue (Japanese: 台湾地方切手)
- New Showa Stamps (Japanese: 1946–48（昭和21–23）新昭和切手)
- Vocational Series (Japanese: 1948–49（昭和23–24）産業 図案切手)
- Showa Unwmkd. Series (Japanese: 1951–52（昭和26–27）昭和すかしなし切手)
- Animal, Plant, & National Treasure Series (Japanese: 1950–65（昭和25–40）動植物 国宝図案切手)
- New Animal, Plant, & National Treasure Series (Japanese: 1966–89（昭和41-平成1）新動植物国宝図案切手)
- Heisei Stamps (Japanese: 1992–（平成4-）平成切手)
  [Published by Japan Post] (Japanese: 日本郵政公社 発行)
  [Published by Japan Post Co., Ltd.] (Japanese: 日本郵便株式会社 発行)
- For Celebration or Condolence, etc. (Japanese: 慶弔切手ほか)
  [Published by Japan Post] (Japanese: 日本郵政公社 発行)
- P-Stamp, Frame Stamp (Japanese: 写真付き切手・フレーム切手)
  [Published by Japan Post Service] (Japanese: 郵便事業株式会社 発行)
  [Published by Japan Post Co., Ltd.] (Japanese: 日本郵便株式会社 発行)
- [Sheet Inscriptions on Definitives (after Animal, Plant, & National Treasure Series)] (Japanese: 銘版つき普通切手リスト(動植物国宝図案切手以降))
- [Color Marks on Definitives] (Japanese: カラーマークつき普通切手リスト)
- Air Mail Stamps (Japanese: 1929–61（昭和4–36）航空切手)
- Booklets (Japanese: 切手帳)
- [Commemorative Booklets] (Japanese: 記念切手帳)

== The outdated sections ==
=== Non-renewable issues. Till 2013 ===
Sources:

- Military Franchise Issues (Japanese: 軍事切手)
- Japanese Post offices abroad (Japanese: 在外国局切手)
  - Korea, I.J.P.O. (Japanese: 在朝鮮局)
  - China, I.J.P.O. (Japanese: 在中国局)
- Miscellaneous (Japanese: その他の切手類)
  - Postal Saving Stamp (Japanese: 郵便貯金切手)
  - Election Stamp (Japanese: 選挙切手)
  - Telegraph stamps (Japanese: 電信切手)
  - Official Urgent Stamps (Japanese: 飛信逓送切手)
  - Tosa Local Stamp (Japanese: 村送（むらおくり）切手)
  - Sutherland Stamps (Japanese: サザーランド切手)
  - BANDO P.O.W. Stamps (Japanese: 板東収容所切手)
  - British Forces Occupation Issues (Japanese: 日本占領イギリス連邦軍切手)
- "Manchukuo" Puppet Government (Japanese: 「満州国」切手)
  - Postal Savings Stamps (Japanese: 貯金切手)
  - Unissued (Japanese: 不発行切手)
  - Booklets (Japanese: 郵便 切手帳)
- Japanese Occupation Issues (fragments) (Japanese: 南方 占領 地域切手 (抜粋))
  - Burma (Japanese: ビルマ)
  - Java (Japanese: ジャワ)
  - Japanese Naval Control Area (Japanese: 海軍民政府)
  - Sumatra (Japanese: スマトラ)
  - Malaya (Japanese: マライ)
  - Philippine Islands (Japanese: フィリピン)
  - North Borneo (Japanese: 北ボルネオ)
  - Hong Kong (Japanese: ホンコン)
  - [Japanese Occupation of China (fragments)] (Japanese: 中国占領地域切手 (抜粋))
    - North China (Japanese: 華北地区)
    - Mengkiang (Japanese: 蒙疆地区)
    - Central China (Japanese: 華中地区)

=== Okinawa, under US Administration (Japanese: 沖縄切手). Till 2014 ===
Sources:

- Unissued (Japanese: 不発行切手)

=== Postal stationery (Japanese: ステーショナリー). Till 2015 ===
Sources:

- Postal cards (Japanese: 〔普通 はがき〕)
  - 1 [Etched Cards. Size 78×163 mm] (Japanese: 1. 手彫（てぼり）はがき 大きさ:78×163ミリ)
  - 2 [Koban Cards. Size 90×142 mm] (Japanese: 2. 小判はがき 大きさ:90×142ミリ)
  - 3 [Chrysanthemum Cards. Size 90×140 mm] (Japanese: 3. 菊はがき 大きさ:90×140ミリ)
  - 4 ["Weights" Cards. Size 90×142 mm] (Japanese: 4. 分銅（ふんどう）はがき 大きさ:90×142ミリ)
  - 5 [Earthquake Emergency Cards. Size 80×130 mm] (Japanese: 5. 震災はがき 大きさ:80×130ミリ)
  - 6 [Kusunoki Masashige Cards. Size 90×140 mm] (Japanese: 6. 楠公（なんこう）はがき 大きさ:90×140ミリ)
  - 6A [Little Kusunoki Masashige Cards. Size 70×120 mm] (Japanese: 6A. 小型楠公はがき 大きさ:70×120ミリ)
  - 7 [Cherry blossom Cards. Size 90×140 mm] (Japanese: 7. 桜はがき 大きさ:90×140ミリ)
  - 8 [Rice Cards. Size 90×140 mm] (Japanese: 8. 稲 束はがき 大きさ:90×140ミリ)
  - 9 [National Diet Building Cards. Size 90×140 mm] (Japanese: 9. 議事堂はがき 大きさ:90×140ミリ)
  - 10 [Yumedono Cards] (Japanese: 10. 夢殿（ゆめどの）はがき)
  - 11 [Flying Mythological Creatures Cards. Size 100×148 mm] (Japanese: 11. 飛天はがき 大きさ:100×148ミリ)
  - 12 [Earthenware Cards. Size 100×148 mm] (Japanese: 12. 土器はがき 大きさ:100×148ミリ)
  - 13 [Station bell Cards. Size 100×148 mm] (Japanese: 13. 駅鈴はがき 大きさ:100×148ミリ)
  - 14 [Bodhisattva Cards. Size 100×148 mm] (Japanese: 14. 麻布菩薩はがき 大きさ:100×148ミリ)
  - 15 [Fenghuang Cards. Size 100×148 mm] (Japanese: 15. 鳳凰はがき 大きさ:100×148ミリ)
  - 16 [Bell tower Cards. Size 100×148 mm] (Japanese: 16. 鐘楼はがき 大きさ:100×148ミリ)
  - 17 [Old Mandarin Duck Cards. Size 100×148 mm] (Japanese: 17. 旧オシドリはがき 大きさ:100×148ミリ)
  - 18 [Flying Horse Cards. Size 100×148 mm] (Japanese: 18. 天馬はがき 大きさ:100×148ミリ)
  - 19 [New Mandarin Duck Cards. Size 100×148 mm] (Japanese: 19. 新オシドリはがき 大きさ:100×148ミリ)
  - 20 [Hand fan. Size 100×148 mm] (Japanese: 20. 扇面はがき 大きさ:100×148ミリ)
- International Mail Postal Cards (Japanese: 〔外信用はがき〕)
- Commemorative Postal Cards (Japanese: 〔記念・特殊はがき〕)
- New Year's Postal Cards (Japanese: 〔年賀はがき〕)
- Season Greeting Postal Cards (Japanese: 〔季節見舞はがき〕)
- Blue Bird Postal Cards (Japanese: 〔青い鳥はがき〕)
- Heart Mail (Japanese: 〔はあとめーる〕)
- [Miscellaneous] (Japanese: その他の官製はがき)
  - [Postal Cards with Advertisements] (Japanese: 広告つきはがき（エコーはがき）)
  - [Picture Postal Cards] (Japanese: 絵入リはがき)
  - [Prefecture Postal Cards] (Japanese: ふるさと絵はがき)
- Stamped envelopes (Japanese: 〔切手つき封筒〕)
- Letter sheets (Japanese: 〔封緘はがき〕)
- Aerogrammes (Japanese: 〔航空書簡〕)
- Cards for Parcel post (Japanese: 〔小包はがき〕)
- Wrappers (Japanese: 〔郵便帯紙〕)
- For Official Mail (Japanese: 〔事務用はがき〕)
- Weather Reports (Japanese: 〔気象 報告帯紙〕)
- For Military Post (Japanese: 〔軍事郵便はがき〕)
- Post Offices Abroad (Japanese: 〔在外局発行〕)
  - 1 "For Use in China" Ovpt. Issue (Japanese: 1. 在中国 局（〈支那〉加刷）)
  - 2 South Manchuria Railway Zone (Japanese: 2. 関東庁発行（南満州鉄道付属地使用）)
- Taiwan and Korea Provisional Issues (Japanese: 〔旧植民地発行〕)
  - 1 Taiwan Provisional Issue (Japanese: 1. 台湾総督府発行（台湾楠公）)
  - 2 Korean Provisional Issue (Japanese: 2. 朝鮮総督府発行（朝鮮楠公）)

=== [Some "Comb" Type Cancellations] (Japanese: 櫛 型 日付印の見わけ方) (1983) ===
- I [Main Japanese Mail] (Japanese: I. 国内一般局)
  - 1 [Inland Mail] (Japanese: 1. 国内用和文印)
  - 2 [Non-Mail Mark] (Japanese: 2. 国内用非郵便印)
  - 3 [Air cargo] (Japanese: 3. 国内用のその便の印)
  - 4 [Foreign Mail] (Japanese: 4. 外国用欧文印)
- II [Special and Military mail] (Japanese: II. 国内特殊局と軍事局)
  - 1 [Railway Mail Service] (Japanese: 1. 鉄道郵便局)
  - 2 [Seapost Service] (Japanese: 2. 船内郵便局)
  - 3 [Military mail] (Japanese: 3. 軍事郵便局)
- III [Colonies] (Japanese: III. 旧植民地)
  - 1 [Korea] (Japanese: 1. 朝鮮)
  - 2 [Taiwan] (Japanese: 2. 台湾)
  - 3 [Kwantung and South Manchuria Railway] (Japanese: 3. 関東州・南満州鉄道付属地)
  - 4 [Sakhalin] (Japanese: 4. 樺太)
  - 5 [Shandong Peninsula] (Japanese: 5. 山東半島)
  - 6 [South Seas Mandate] (Japanese: 6. 南洋諸島)
- IV [Japan Office in China] (Japanese: IV. 在中国日本局)

=== Pre-Paid Card for Postage (Japanese: ふみ力ード（郵便用プリペイド・力ード）) (Sakura 1990–Sakura 1992) ===
- [National Newspaper Pre-Paid Card] (Japanese: 〔全国版〕)
- [Local Newspaper Pre-Paid Card] (Japanese: 〔地方版〕)

=== JPS Original Philatelic Materials (Japanese: JPS郵便活動マテリアル) (1999) ===
- [Announcement] (Japanese: 〔フォアランナー〕)
- [U-Card] (Japanese: 〔ゆうぺーン〕)
- [Cards with Advertisements] (Japanese: 〔エコーはがき〕)
- [Stored-value cards (Fumi Cards)] (Japanese: 〔ふみカード〕)

=== Small additions ===
- [Perforation gauge] (Japanese: ライン 式 目打 ゲ一ジ) (Sakura 1967–Sakura 1988)
- Notices (Sakura 1980–Sakura 1994)
