= Zumstein catalog =

Swiss postage stamp catalog

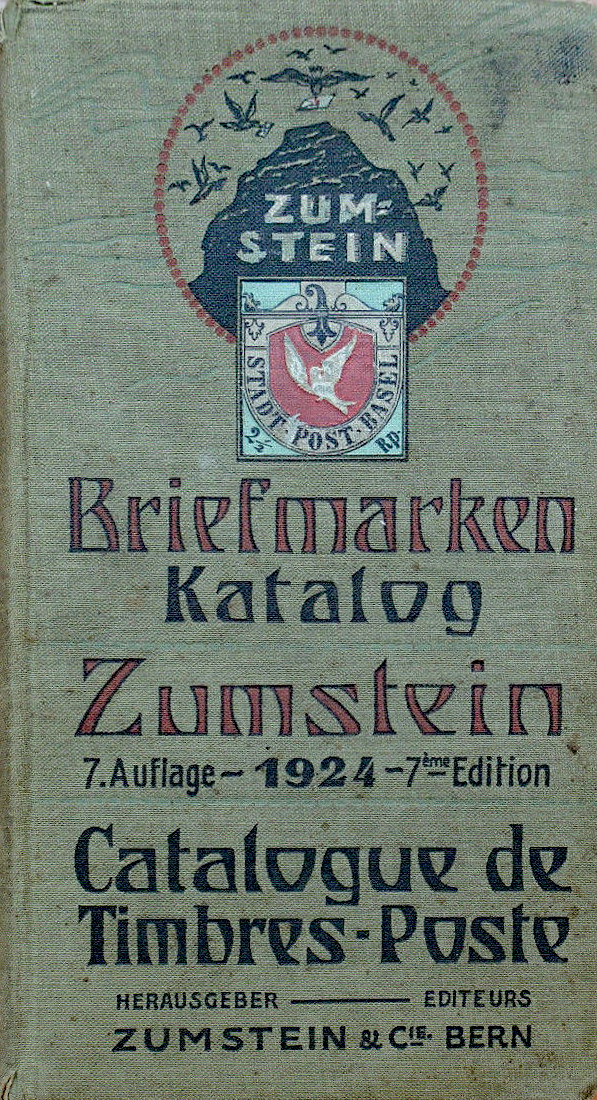
1924 catalog: Volume 7, 7th edition

The Zumstein catalog is a postage stamp catalog from Switzerland. It has been issued regularly since 1909 and is considered to be an important reference work of Swiss philately. It is published in German and French languages.

The catalog is produced by the Swiss company Zumstein & Cie in Bern. While their main product is a catalog for the stamps of Switzerland and neighboring country Liechtenstein, updated annually, they also publish catalogs for "Europa West" (Western Europe) and "Europa Ost" (Eastern Europe). In addition, they produce a lengthier specialized catalog for Switzerland, as well as a number of monographs on topics in Swiss philately.

The Zumstein catalogs were originated by the philatelist Ernst Zumstein, who founded the stamp shop Zumstein in 1905 and published the journal Philatelistische Börsennachrichten starting in 1907 (this journal is still published today, since 1915 under the name Berner Briefmarken-Zeitung).
