= Colnect =

Online collectibles catalog website

Colnect Collectors Club Community
- Website type: Online collectible item catalogs and personal collection management
- Available in: 62 languages
- Founded: 28 April 2002
- Owners: Colnect, private
- Founder: Amir Wald
- Website: colnect.com/en
- Registration: free registration is optional
- Current status: Active

Colnect Collectors Club Community is a website containing wiki-like collectables catalogs. It allows collectors to manage their personal collection using these catalogs and automatically match their swap/wish-lists with those of other collectors. Colnect provides a marketplace dedicated to buying and selling collectibles. Colnect's phone cards catalog is the biggest in the world.

== History ==
Colnect was founded in 2002 as Islands Phonecards Database with the aim to create a catalog of all phonecards. Since autumn 2008, stamps and coins are supported in addition to phone cards. In the meantime, 43 types of collectables are represented.

== Features ==
The collectables catalogs on Colnect are created by collectors using the site. New items are added by contributors and verified by volunteering editors. Though any collector may add their comments on a catalog item, actual changes are done only by site-trusted editors. All users can see the catalog information (issue dates, print runs, pictures, etc.). Registered users can additionally manage their personal collection by marking each item as belonging to their collection, swap list or wish list while browsing through the catalogs. These users automatically can match their swap list with a wish list of another user and vice versa. Users can purchase a Premium membership with additional features. Contributors get it for free. Premium members can download any list with collectables and open it as a spreadsheet.

Colnect provides a marketplace for collectibles. It is publicly available since December 27, 2017. Sales on the marketplace are connected to the centralized catalogs. Sellers can post items for sale directly from the catalog and buyers can view information about a collectible on the item's page.

== Statistics ==
The site reports it caters for collectors from 113 countries. Hundreds of them are helping the site voluntarily, including the translators who translate Colnect into 62 languages.

As of 2018 Colnect lists 435 Chinese transportation tickets, which are issued by 147 different Chinese companies.

== Rewards ==
On April 25, 2009 Colnect was announced as the winner in the European Startup 2.0 competition, out of about 200 competing companies and 11 finalists.

On December 31, 2009 Colnect was a close runner up on the TechAviv Peer Awards startup companies competition. It has lost to 5min by a single vote.

== See also ==
- Coin Collecting - Coins and Currencies
- Deltiology - Postcards
- Stamp collecting - Stamps
- Notaphily - Banknotes
- Phillumeny - Matchboxes
- Philography - Autographs
- Scutelliphily - Patches and Badges
- Sucrology - Sugar Packets
- Tegestology - Beer Coasters
