= Christian Minkus =

Christian Minkus (May or June 1770 in Klein-Lassowitz – November 20, 1849 in Marienfeld) represented Silesian constituencies of the former German provinces Rosenberg O.S. and Kreuzburg O.S. as a member of the Frankfurt Assembly.

== Life ==
He was born in May or June 1770 in Klein-Lassowitz, Silesia, as the son of a farmer. He travelled through Upper Silesia as a salesman and thus became familiar with the needs of the local population. Through this awareness, Minkus became a representative of the counties Rosenberg O.S. and Kreuzburg O.S. in the Frankfurt National Assembly from May 29, 1848 to May 26, 1849. He was one of the oldest members of the first German National Assembly and was a member of the left-leaning faction Deutscher Hof and, after November 21, 1848, the united left coalition, the Centralmärzverein. Minkus voted for Friedrich Wilhelm IV to become the German Emperor. In October 1848, he was remanded to custody pending investigations into accusations of incitement to treason, murder, and conspiracy against the state after the death of politicians Felix Lichnowsky and Hans von Auserwald at the hands of a mob during the September 1848 riots. An extradition request by the municipal court of Rosenberg was rejected in January 1849 by the National Assembly.

=== Minkus Affair ===
Minkus later sued three conservative representatives, who defamed him, saying that he was instrumental in the murders. He won the trial. This happening is known as the Minkus affair, exemplary for the behaviour of the conservatives in the later stages of the assembly. Maximilian Reinganum, lawyer of the Rothschilds in Frankfurt, defended Minkus in Court, and the finance minister von Beckerath held a speech in Minkus' name. Minkus died in Marienfeld, Silesia, in November 1849.

On March 7, 1849, Minkus wrote in the Parliament's album:

Blessed is such the moment that appears only rarely, where a kind fate unites a like-minded people, and a man's heart finds connection through friendship to this noble work. I was lucky to be part of this: I may call some people friend, and for me friendship is more valuable than gold. Soon we must separate, I and this beautiful assembly I once dared to join.
