= WADP Numbering System =

The WADP Numbering System (WNS) is a project referring to postage stamps issued in the world since 1 January 2002. It is monitored by the World Association for the Development of Philately (WADP) and the Universal Postal Union. Its inventory is made possible by the declarations of the postal administrations participating in the project.

Its publication appeared on a website where visitors can look for an issue by country, date, topic or key words.

The WNS goals are to give stamp buyers and collectors a stamp catalogue of all official issues and to fight illegal stamps printed without the postal administrations' consent. Since 2002, some developing countries have succeeded in reducing their philatelic program and officially denouncing illegal stamps via the UPU.

When declared, each isolated stamp with a graphic difference (in the design, denomination, color or dimensions) is given a WNS number :

- two letters : the country or region's code in the ISO 3166-1 alpha-2 standard,
- three digits for the position in the year of issue,
- after a point, two digits for the year (.02 means year 2002).
