= Facit catalog =

Postage stamp catalog for the countries of Scandinavia

Facit catalog for Sweden, 2017.

The Facit catalog is a specialized postage stamp catalog for the countries of Scandinavia. First published in 1947, it is the most detailed and complete catalog available for philatelists interested in the stamps of Denmark, Faroes, Finland, Iceland, Norway, Sweden, Greenland, Åland, and the Danish West Indies. Although published in Sweden, the language of the catalog is now English.

Catalog content is developed by a committee of 20 leading philatelists. Beginning with the 2007 catalog, and following a trend among catalog publishers, images of the stamps are printed in color.

Specific recent versions of the catalog include:

- FACIT 2007 Special (2007) - includes all countries, and a handbook section with informative articles
- FACIT Postal VII (2004) - postal history and postmarks of Sweden
- FACIT Sverige 2005 (2005) - nonspecialized catalog for Sweden only
- FACIT Special Classic (2018) - includes all countries with varieties and specialties up to 1951.

The catalogs are published by Facit Förlag AB, located in Västerås, Sweden.
