= Jacques Minkus =

American philatelist

- Born: December 15, 1901; Poland
- Died: September 17, 1996 (aged 94)
- Engineering career
- Projects: Originator of the Minkus stamp catalog and numerous albums for philatelists
- Awards: Luff Award; APS Hall of Fame

Jacques Minkus (December 15, 1901 – September 17, 1996), of New York City, emigrated to the United States in 1929 and established stamp counters for postage stamp collectors at numerous department stores in the United States.

== Philatelic activity ==
Minkus established his first stamp counter at Gimbels department store in Manhattan in 1931. He was successful in this method of selling stamps and continued to open stamp counters in department stores until the 1960s, when he had opened thirty eight counters.

Minkus also published a stamp catalog titled Minkus New World Wide Stamp Catalog starting in 1955. In addition to the catalog, he published over one hundred stamp albums for collectors.

== Honors and awards ==
The Service to Philately Award was presented to Minkus by the American Stamp Dealers Association in 1966. In 1993 he was awarded the Luff Award for Exceptional Contributions to Philately. In 1997 he was elected to the American Philatelic Society Hall of Fame.

== Legacy ==
The Minkus catalog is still used by some collectors today, as it contains material not included in other stamp catalogs.

== See also ==
- Minkus catalogue
- Philatelic literature
