= Ma's Illustrated Catalogue of the Stamps of China =

1947 historical stamp catalogue by Ma Ren Chuen

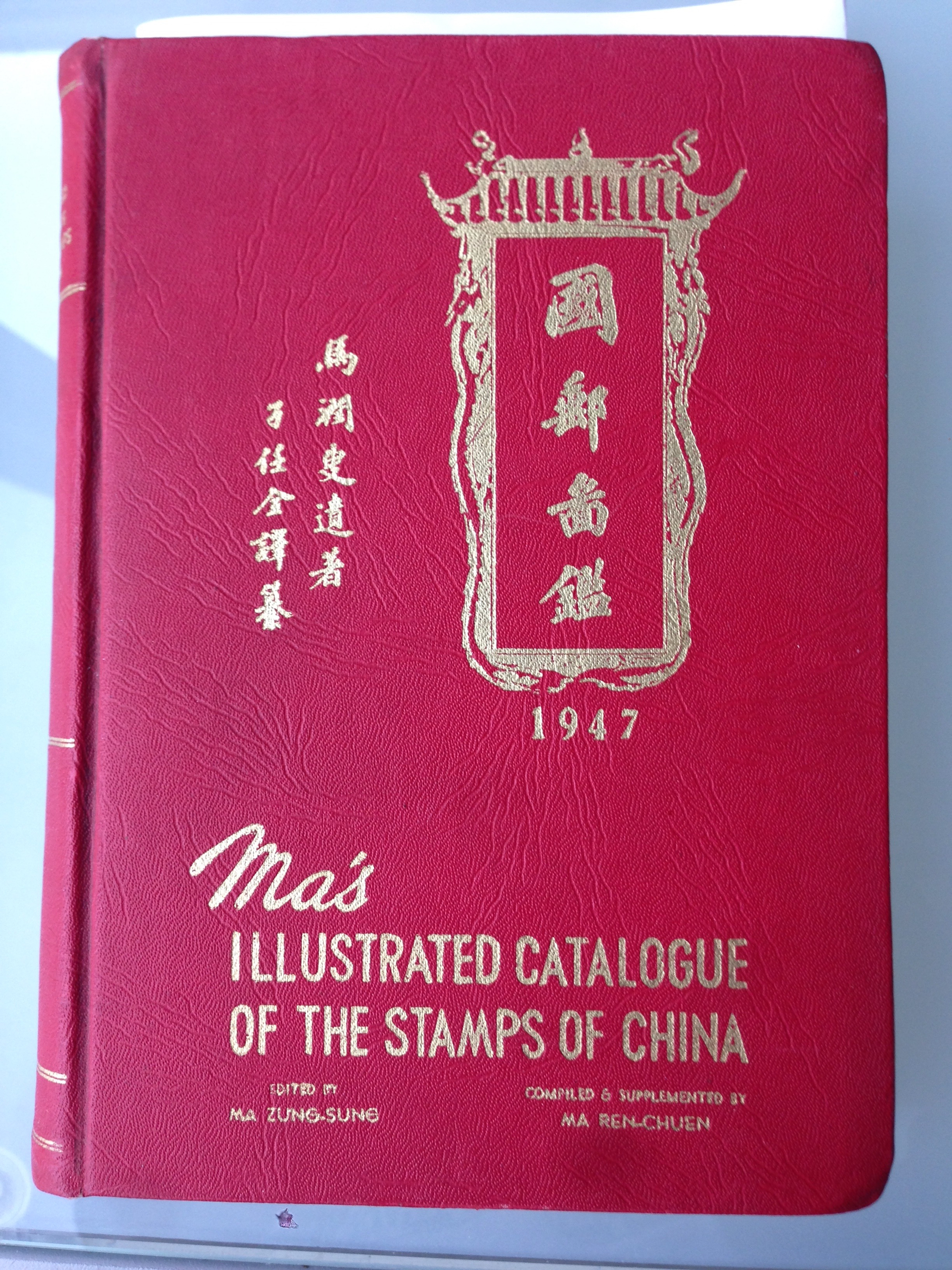
- Author: Ma Ren Chuen
- Original title: 國郵啚鑑
- Language: Traditional Chinese and English
- Series: First Edition
- Release number: 1,000
- Subject: Catalogue of Early Chinese Postage Stamps
- Published: June 1947
- Publisher: Shun Chang & Co., Shanghai
- Publication date: July 1947
- Publication place: Republic of China
- Media type: Hard cover print
- Pages: 568
- Followed by: 中国邮票图鉴(1878 －1949)

Ma's Illustrated Catalogue of the Stamps of China (國郵啚鑑 or 國郵圖鑑) is a specialized catalogue of earlier Chinese stamps covering the periods from the Qing dynasty to the Republic of China. It provides the most comprehensive and systematic record of every stamp from the first Customs issue of 1878 to the Dah Tung print Postage Due stamp in 1947. Ma's Illustrated Catalogue differs from other stamp catalogues as it goes beyond a simple listing of stamps. Ma's catalogue provides a wealth of philately related information of high historical significance that is much needed in the research and study of early Chinese stamps. Today many refer to this catalogue as simply "馬氏圖鑑" or "馬氏國郵圖鑑".

The first edition was primarily sourced from hand written manuscripts edited by the late Ma Zung-Sung (馬潤叟, 1872–1945). His son, Ma Ren-Chuen (馬任全, 1908–1988), already a postal expert in Chinese stamps and like his father a philatelist, was inspired by his father's unfinished wish to put together a comprehensive catalogue during the last four years of his life. After his father's death in 1945, and after extensive consultation with a number of Shanghai's authoritative philatelic experts and philatelic literature collectors, he compiled and supplemented his father's original manuscripts and then translated the entire work from traditional Chinese to English.

The first edition was published with 661 black and white illustrations. The costs for typesetting, proofreading, printing, publishing, and distributing were self-funded by Ma alone. A small quantity of 1000 copies was printed by Shun Chang & Co. (順昌), in Shanghai, China in June 1947.

== See also ==
- Postage stamps and postal history of China
