= Michel catalog =

Largest and best-known stamp catalog in the German-speaking world

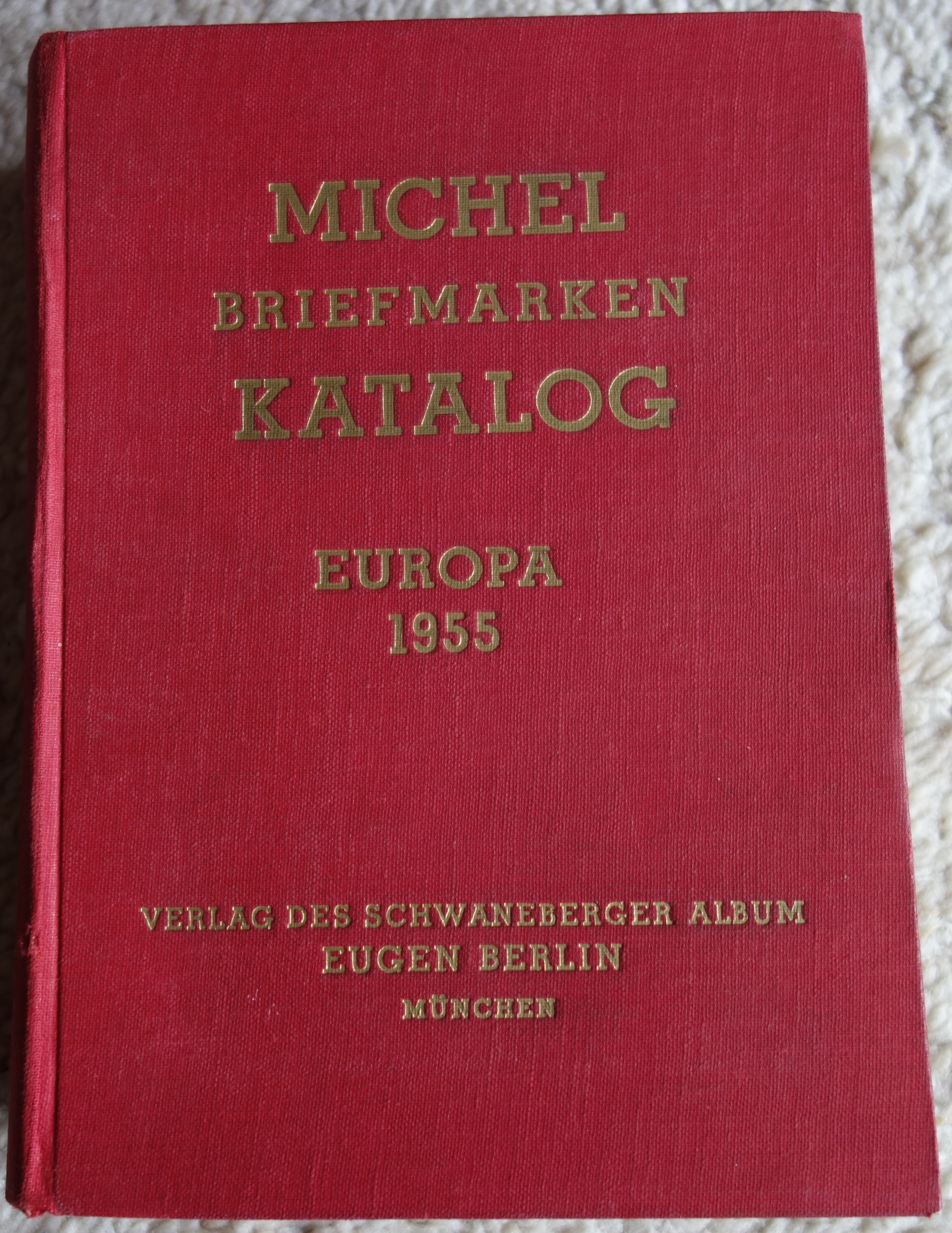
Cover of the 1955 Europa volume, bound in linen

Cover of the 1996 Europa West volume

Michel page describing 1995 Iraq issues not mentioned in the Scott catalog

The Michel catalog (German: MICHEL-Briefmarken-Katalog) is the largest and best-known stamp catalog in the German-speaking world. First published in 1910, it has become an important reference work for philately, with information not available in the English-language Scott catalogue.

== Origins ==
The catalog started out as a price list for the dealer Hugo Michel of Apolda.

By 1920 it was split into two volumes, for "Europe" and "overseas", and eventually grew to a present-day size of about a dozen volumes covering the entire world, with additional specialized volumes bringing the total to some forty catalogs.

== Scope ==
It extensively covers specialized Germany collecting including the complex World War II era stamps of Germany, occupied territories, and provisional stamps.

Unlike Scott, Michel does not issue a complete set of catalogs every year, instead updating only several of the volumes. Michel is also more detailed, with quantities issued, sheet formats, and so forth. Also of significance to some collectors is its coverage of countries and periods omitted by Scott for editorial or political reasons. For instance, US embargoes against Cuba, Iraq, and North Korea are reflected by Scott's failure to show market values for those countries' stamp issues (as late as 2002, Scott did not supply any information at all about North Korean stamps), and Michel is one of few sources for that information.

Michel also documents stamps issued apparently with little or no intent of being used to pay postage and stamps issued by regions or areas with dubious political status. Scott excludes many issues that were unlikely to be actually used to pay postage.

== Catalogue publications ==
There are 15 main catalogues, all issued in German; about 400,000 are printed annually. Their information is also accessible on the Michel internet pages.

=== Germany ===
The standard Germany catalogue (Michel-Deutschland-Katalog) covers all German stamps issues . A more detailed specialized catalogue is available. For young collectors a simplified "Junior Catalogue" is available. All these catalogues are published on an annual basis.

=== Europe ===
Called "Europa-Katalog (EK)" these catalogues appear annually and are divided as follows:

- EK1 West and Central Europe
- EK2 Southern Europe
- EK3 North and Northwest Europe
- EK4 Eastern Europe

=== Overseas ===
Called "Übersee-Katalog (ÜK)" these catalogues appear about every three years. As of 2014 there are 10 issues, some in two volumes. In contrast to the European catalogues the number of stamps printed is not indicated. Not all issues are represented by images.

- ÜK1 North and Central America
- ÜK2 Caribbean Islands
- ÜK3 South America
- ÜK4 North and East Africa
- ÜK5 West Africa
- ÜK6 Southern Africa
- ÜK7 Australia, Oceania, Antarctic Territories
- ÜK8 South and Southeast Asia
- ÜK9 Central and East Asia
- ÜK10 Middle East

=== Other stamp catalogues ===
Aside from Germany, a number of other countries are covered in specialized catalogues that indicate more details such as variations and first day cancellation. Specialized catalogues are available for Austria, Switzerland and Liechtenstein, Great Britain, United States, Croatia, and the United Nations. In addition, other philatelic titles are published.

== English issues ==
Recently Michel publishers (Schwaneberger Verlag) has issued some English-language titles, viz.:

- Gulf States (2006, all colour focussed on the Arabian peninsula from Abu Dhabi-Yemen inc. the "sheikhdom issues");
- Germany Specialized. Vol. 1 (2007, empire, colonies ec. up to 1945), Vol. 2 (2009, WWII and aftermath inc. related as Generalgouvernement, allied occ. zones); not covered up to now old German states and post-1949, probably in a Vol. 3. The Germany specializeds are issued in co-operation with the APS affiliate German Philatelic Society.
