= Commemorative stamp =

Postage stamp created to honor or commemorate a place, event, person, or object

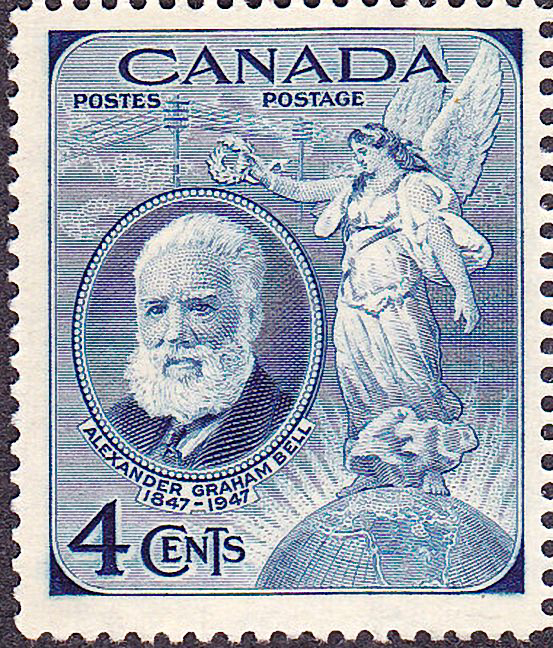
Alexander Graham Bell commemorative issue of 1947

A commemorative stamp is a postage stamp, often issued on a significant date such as an anniversary, to honor or commemorate a place, event, person, or object. The subject of the commemorative stamp is usually spelled out in print, unlike definitive stamps which normally depict the subject along with the denomination and country name only. Many postal services issue several commemorative stamps each year, sometimes holding first day of issue ceremonies at locations connected with the subjects. Commemorative stamps can be used alongside ordinary stamps. Unlike definitive stamps that are often reprinted and sold over a prolonged period of time for general usage, commemorative stamps are usually printed in limited quantities and sold for a much shorter period of time, usually, until supplies run out.

== First commemoratives ==
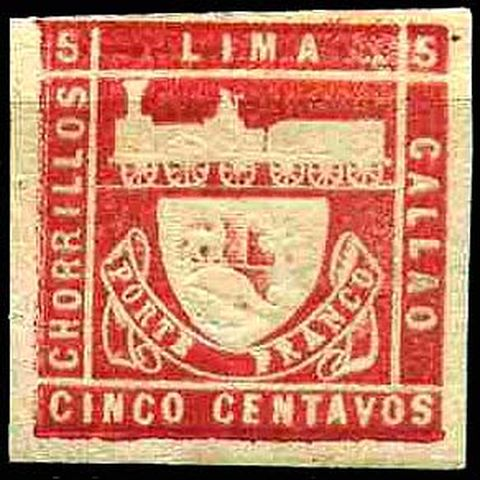
First Peru commemorative stamp issue, 1870

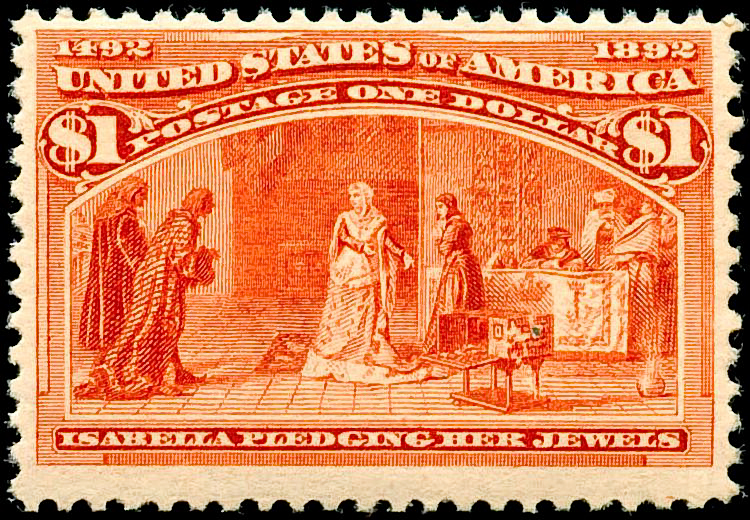
The $1 stamp included in the US issue of commemoratives, introduced on January 2, 1893

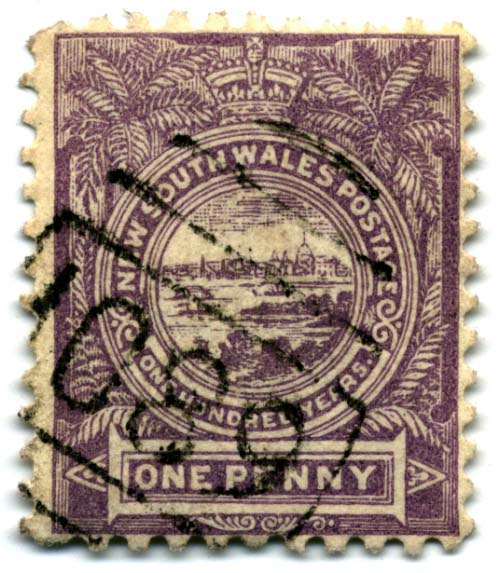
New South Wales first commemorative stamp, 1888

There are several candidates for the title of the first commemorative. A 17-cent stamp issued in 1860 by New Brunswick, showing the Prince of Wales in anticipation of his visit is one possibility. Often cited as the world's first commemoratives are the sixteen stamps of the United States Columbian Issue, produced to celebrate the World Columbian Exposition in Chicago honoring the 400th anniversary of Christopher Columbus's arrival in the New World in 1492. (Illustrated here is the $1 stamp from the series: "Isabella pledging her jewels.")

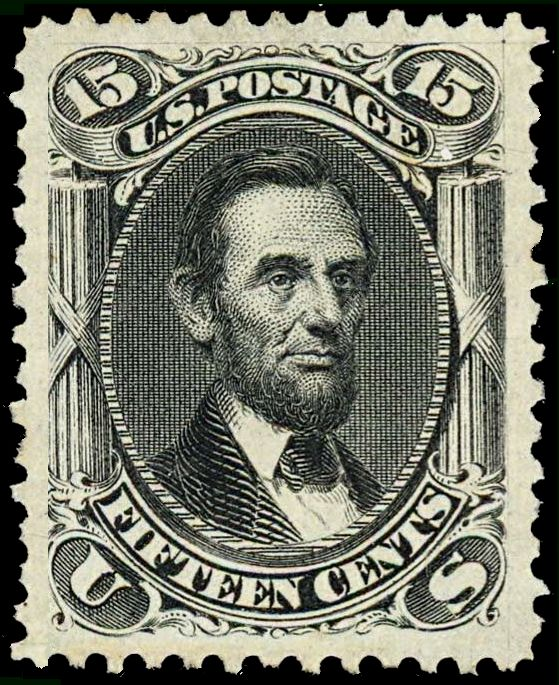
Abraham Lincoln Issue of 1866

The United States 15-cent black stamp of 1866 depicts Abraham Lincoln and was the first stamp issued after his assassination in 1865, but it was not officially declared as a memorial to him. The U.S. also issued a 5-cent stamp in 1882 showing the recently assassinated President James A. Garfield. In addition, the United States issued stamped envelopes for the Centennial Exposition in 1876, although technically these are postal stationery and not stamps. The British Jubilee Issue of 1887 may be thought of as commemorative of the 50 years' reign of Queen Victoria, although there are no special inscriptions on the stamps, and they were intended as regular stamps. In 1870 Peru issued a 5¢ scarlet Locomotive and Arms stamp and is regarded as the first commemorative postage stamp, issued to commemorate the 20th anniversary of the first railway in South America.

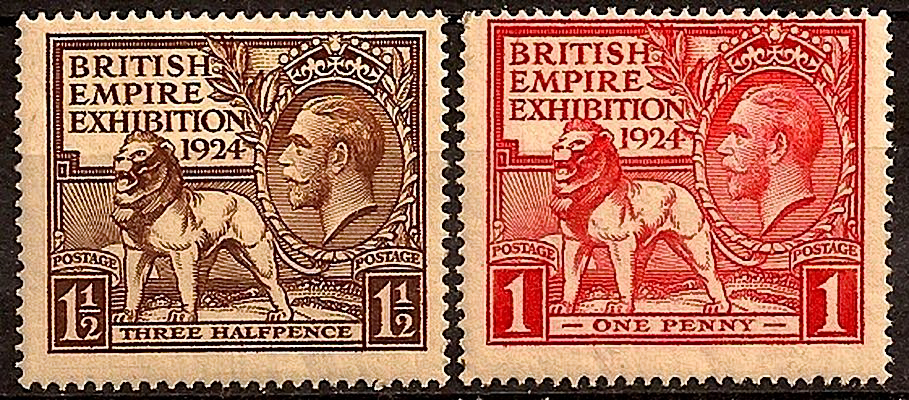
First UK commemorative stamps Issue of 1924

Though the United Kingdom often set the precedent for postage stamps and their designs, they were late runners with the issue of their first commemorative stamp, not issuing one until 1924 when they printed and released the British Empire Exhibition issue of 1924.

Other premier commemorative stamps were issued by New South Wales in 1888 to mark its 100th anniversary; the six types all include the inscription "ONE HUNDRED YEARS". Commemoratives followed in 1891 for Hong Kong and Romania. In 1892 and 1893 a half-dozen nations of America and Spain issued commemorative stamps for the 400th anniversary of the West's discovery of America by Christopher Columbus.

== Backlash ==
The appearance of commemorative postage stamps caused a backlash among some stamp collectors in the early years of stamp collecting, who balked at the prospect of laying out ever-larger sums to acquire the stamps of the world. This led to the formation of the Society for the Suppression of Speculative Stamps in 1895. The organization broke up after unsuccessful attempts at getting collectors at large to comply with their wishes. Today early commemoratives are still prized by collectors.

== See also ==
- Airmail stamp
- Stamp collecting
- Territories of the United States on stamps
- Template:US stamp locator
