= Stamp catalog =

Catalog of types of postage stamps

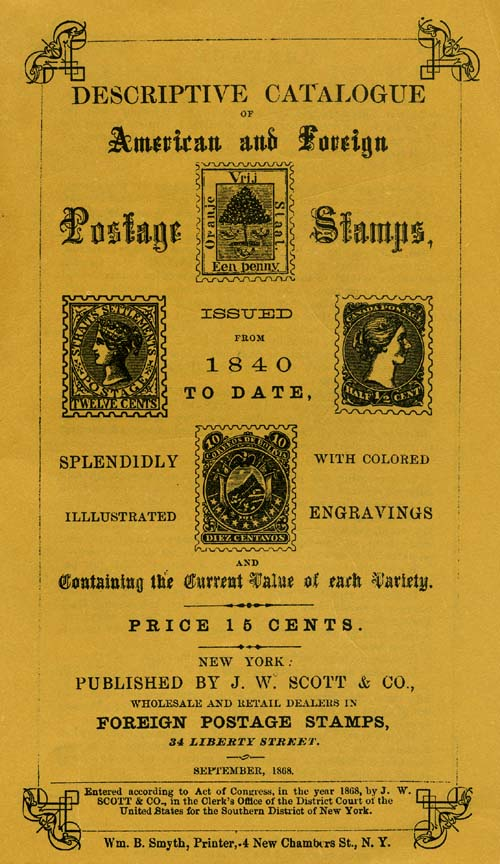
Cover of the 1868 Scott catalogue covering the first 28 years of stamps; "America and Foreign"

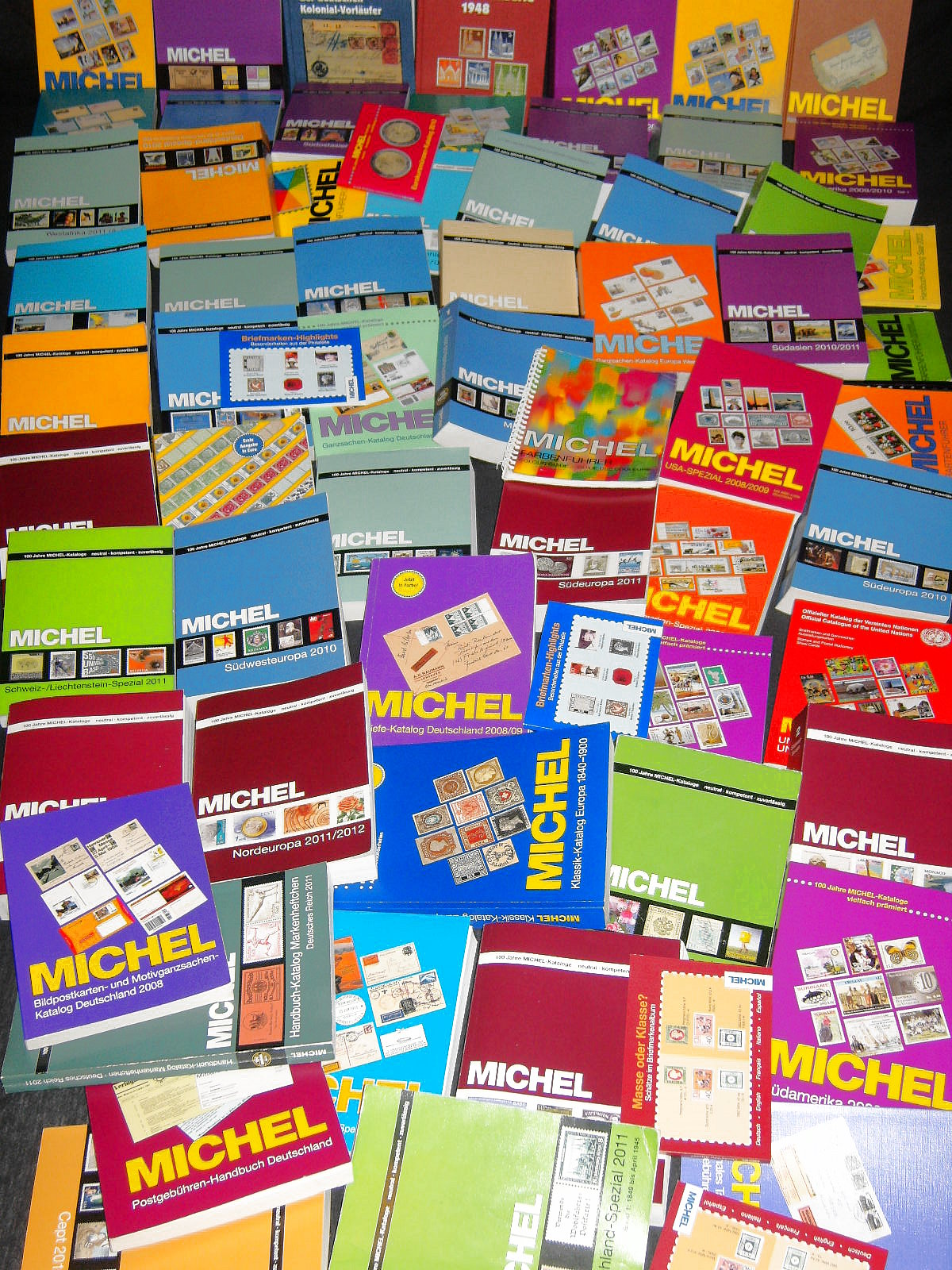
Catalogs from the Michel range

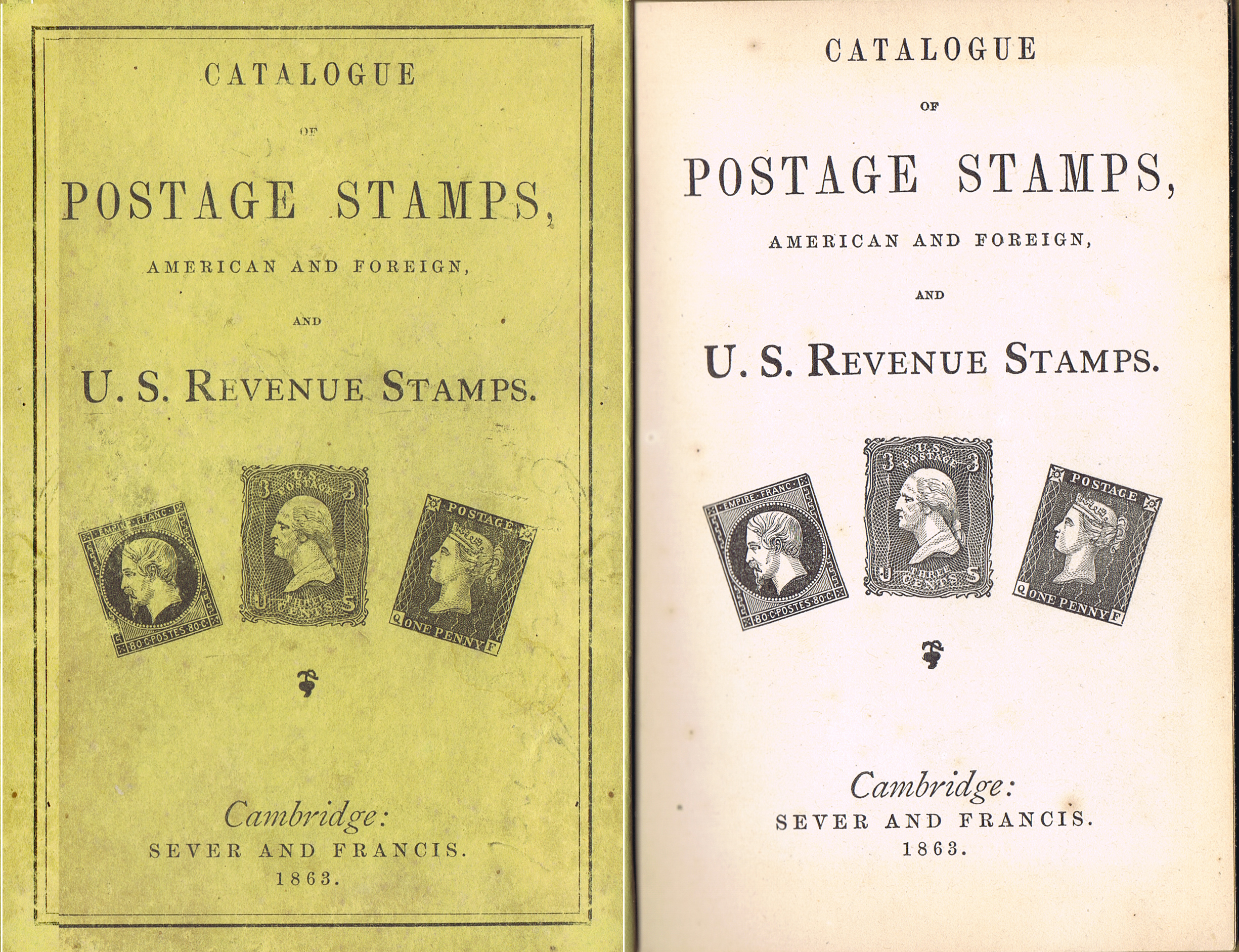
First original American stamp catalog

A stamp catalog (or stamp catalogue) is a catalog of postage stamp types with descriptions and prices.

The stamp catalog is an essential tool of philately and stamp collecting. Stamp catalogs are part of philatelic literature.

Similar catalogs of other collectible objects, such as matchboxes (phillumeny) and postcards (deltiology) have also been issued.

== History ==
The first stamp catalog was published in France by Oscar Berger-Levrault on 17 September 1861 and the first illustrated catalog by Alfred Potiquet in December 1861 (based on the earlier work).

The first catalogs in Great Britain were published in 1862 by Frederick Booty, Mount Brown, and Dr. John Edward Gray. The first in the United States was The Stamp Collector's Manual by A.C. Kline (a pseudonym for John William Kline), also 1862.

Originally catalogs were just dealers' price lists, though today that is less common. The catalogs of some major publishers continue to serve as an official price list for the publisher. For example, Stanley Gibbons in the United Kingdom specifically states in the catalog that the price listed is the estimated selling price by Stanley Gibbons Ltd. On the other hand, Scott in the United States does not sell stamps. Rather, the Scott catalog serves as a reference document for expected prices used by buyers and sellers. Over time, as philately developed, catalogs tended to accumulate additional supporting details about the stamps, such as dates of issue, color variations, and so forth. As their use by collectors became widespread, the catalogs came to define what was and was not a legitimate stamp, since many collectors would avoid stamps not described in the catalog. In recent years, the Internet has become a common resource for information about stamps. Some catalogs have an on-line version while others are available only on-line.

== Current catalogs ==
The following catalogs have a worldwide coverage:

- Michel - printed, software and online
- Scott - printed and online
- Stanley Gibbons - printed and online
- Yvert et Tellier - printed only

These are large undertakings, since there are thousands of new stamps to describe each year, and the prices of all stamps may go up or down. For publishers that are not dealers, the prices are estimated by data from dealers and auctions.

In addition, the catalog publishers usually put out specialized volumes with additional details, generally by nationality: Michel has a specialized German catalog, Scott a specialized US catalog, and so forth.

Many countries have their own "national catalogs", typically put out by a leading publisher or dealer in that country. Postal administrations may themselves put out catalogs, although they tend to be aimed at less-experienced collectors, and rarely provide fully detailed stamp data. Some notable country catalogs include:

- ABDA (Philippines)
- Aerophil (Switzerland)
- AFA (Denmark)
- AFINSA (Portugal)
- Brusden-White (Australia)
- Edifil catalogs (Spain and its former colonies)
- Facit (all countries of Scandinavia)
- Fischer (Poland)
- Hellas (Greece)
- Hibernian Catalogue and Handbook (Ireland)
- JB Catalogue of Malta Stamps and Postal History (Malta)
- JSCA catalog (Japan) (ru)
- KPC- Korean Postage Stamp Catalogue (Korea)
- Lamy (Peru)
- Ma catalog (China)
- Chan catalog (China)
- Yang catalog (China, published in Hong Kong)
- Phila India - Manik (India)
- RHM (Brazil)
- Sassone (Italy)
- Sakura catalog (Japan)
- NVPH catalog (Netherlands)
- Zumstein (Switzerland)

== Online catalogs ==
- Colnect 1,432,751 stamps by themes, years, countries, free, with values
- FindYourStampsValue 144,383 stamps worldwide, fee based membership, search by keywords, photos
- Freestampcatalogue 246,479 stamps worldwide, with topic lists
- Italian Stamps Catalog 25,249 stamps, website in Italian
- StampData 748,921 stamp types, free, without values
- New Zealand Online Catalog by themes, years and face values
- Stamps of the World Wiki 27,757 pages containing 382,414 images, free, without values
- StampWorld 840,739, free, with values
- The WikiBooks Worldwide Stamp Catalogue

Stamp counters updated from the respective websites on 2024-5-29

== See also ==
- List of stamp catalogues
- Stamp album
