= Luff Award =

Philatelic award

The Luff Award is awarded by the American Philatelic Society (commonly known as the APS) for meritorious contributions to philately by living philatelists.

== Established ==
The award was established in 1940 in memory of John N. Luff, distinguished philatelist and president of the APS from 1907 to 1909.

== Basis of the award ==
The recipient of the award must be a living philatelist. Three Luff Awards are usually presented each year – one each for:

- distinguished philatelic research
- exceptional contributions to philately
- outstanding service to the American Philatelic Society

== Honorees ==
Luff Awards were presented by the society, starting in 1940 and continuing to this day. During some years, awards were not presented for various reasons.

Year	Distinguished Philatelic Research	Exceptional Contributions to Philately	Outstanding Service to the Society
2024	Kenneth H. Trettin	Jay B. Stotts	Stephen Reinhard
2023	Jerzy W. Kupiec-Weglinski	Lloyd A. de Vries	Patricia A. (Trish) Kaufmann
2022	Hal Vogel	Jacquelyn S. Alton	Kenneth R. Nilsestuen
2021	Ron Lesher	Darrell Ertzberger	Alfredo Frohlich
2020	James Peter Gough	Yamil H. Kouri, Jr	Kenneth Grant
2019	Thomas M. Lera	R. Timothy Bartshe	Kathryn J. Johnson
2018	John H. Barwis	Denise L. Stotts	Wayne L. Youngblood
2017	Fred F. Gregory	Allen R. Kane	Wade E. Saadi
2016	Robert Dalton Harris and Diane DeBlois	Cheryl R. Ganz	Dennis Gilson
2015	Leo J. Harris	MaryAnn Bowman	James E. McDevitt
2014	Edward J.J. Grabowski	Richard E. Drews	Janet Klug
2013	Dr. Arthur H. Groten	George Jay Kramer	Richard S. Nakles
2012	James W. Graue	Michael D. Dixon	Steven J. Rod
2011	Len Piszkiewicz	Patricia Stilwell Walker	Roger Schnell
2010	A.D. (Don) Jones	James P. Mazepa	Donald J. Sundman
2009	Kees Adema	David A. Kent	Not Given
2008	Stanley J. Luft	Nancy B. Clark	Peter P. McCann
2007	Roger S. Brody	Stephen D. Schumann	E. Eugene Fricks
2006	Harlan F. Stone II	Joseph E. Foley	Charles J. Peterson
2005	Alfred F. Kugel	Cheryl Edgcomb	Ann Triggle
2004	Kurt Kimmel	Diane Boehret	John M. Hotchner
2003	Reuben Ramkissoon	George B. Griffenhagen	W. Danforth Walker
2002	Anthony S. Wawrukiewicz	Alan Warren	William L. Welch, Jr.
2001	George B. Arfken	Elizabeth G. Towle	David A. Flood
2000	Calvet M. Hahn	James H. Bruns	Randy Laning Neil
1999	Richard F. Winter	John E. Lievsay	Frank L. Sente
1998	Varro Eugene Tyler	Raymond Henry Weill	F. Burton Sellers
1997	Philip T. Wall	Lester E. Winick	Robert de Violini
1996	Victor E. Engstrom	Robert P. Odenweller	Not Given
1995	Ernst Max Cohn	Charles Jenkins	Gordon P. Wrenn
1994	Hubert C. Skinner	Jerome D. Husak	Keith A. Wagner
1993	C.W. 'Bert' Christian	Jacques Minkus	Not Given
1992	Richard B. Graham	C. Belmont Faries	Herbert A. Trenchard
1991	L. Norman Williams	Mary Ann Owens	Lois Evans de Violini
1990	Austin Haller	Leo August	Dmytro Bykovetz, Jr.
1989	Werner M. Bohne	Clyde Jennings	Not Given
1988	Karl H. Schimmer	Charles J. Peterson	Wilbur F. Cannon
1987	Henry M. Gobie	Kenneth A. Wood	William H. Bauer
1986	Charles J. Starnes	Susan Marshall McDonald	Walton Eugene Tinsley
1985	Thomas J. Alexander	James H. Beal	Robert Laurenson Dashiell Davidson
1984	Dr. Soichi Ichida	Gordon C. Morison	Not Given
1983	Robert Granville Stone	F. Burton Sellers	John E. Foxworth, Jr.
1982	Carl H. Werenskiold	Richard H. Thompson	Bernard A. Hennig
1981	Charles A. Fricke	Enzo Diena	Cyrus R. Thompson
1980	George E. Hargest	Robson Lowe	Emerson A. Clark
1979	Philip Silver	William W. Wylie	Not Given
1978	George Wendell Brett	John Robert Boker, Jr.	Daniel W. Vooys
1976	Denwood N. Kelly	Ernest Anthony Kehr	George Townsend Turner
1974	Horace W. Harrison	Eugene N. Costales	George M. Martin
1972	Alex L. ter Braake	Edward N. Sampson	Frederick B. Thomas
1970	Creighton C. Hart	Ezra Danolds Cole	Mrs. Arthur G. Lane
1968	Arnold H. Warren	Herbert J. Bloch	Anna D. and Paul J. Plant
1966	Richard McPherren Cabeen	Henry E. Harris	H. Clay Musser
1964	Judge Edward I.P. Tatelman	James M. Chemi	Joseph M. Clary
1962	Mortimer L. Neinken	Earl P. L. Apfelbaum	George A. Blizil
1961	Frank J. Kovarik	Herman Herst, Jr.	Charles C. Cratsenberg
1958	Col. James T. DeVoss	Henry Abt	Bernard Davis
1956	Barbara R. Mueller	Daniel W. Vooys	Not Given
1954	Solomon Glass	Dr. Holland A. Davis	Not Given
1952	Winthrop Smillie Boggs	Van Dyk Mac Bride	Major James T. DeVoss
1950	Max G. Johl	Donald F. Lybarger	Laurence D. Shoemaker
1948	Lester George Brookman	Chester Smeltzer	Harry L. Lindquist
1946	Clarence W. Brazer	Lester George Brookman	David Louis Lidman
1944	Dr. Carroll Chase	Elliott Perry	Col. Ralph A. Kimble
1940	Stanley Bryan Ashbrook	August Dietz	Not Given
