= List of philatelic libraries =

This is a list of philatelic libraries.

== Philatelic libraries ==
- International Postal History Library (Belgium)
- American Philatelic Research Library (United States)
- Chunghwa Postal Museum Library (Taiwan)
- Crawford Library, part of the British Library Philatelic Collection (United Kingdom)
- Hamburg Philatelic Library (Germany)
- KNBF Bondsbibliotheek (Netherlands)
- Munich Philatelic Library (Germany)
- Northern Philatelic Library (United States)
- Northwest Philatelic Library (United States)
- Philas Library (Australia)
- Rocky Mountain Philatelic Library (United States)
- San Diego Philatelic Library (United States)
- Scandinavian Collectors Club Library (United States)
- Western Philatelic Library (United States)
- Wineburgh Philatelic Research Library (United States)

== Institutions with philatelic libraries ==
- Istituto di studi storici postali "Aldo Cecchi" onlus (Italy)
- Postal History Foundation, Peggy J. Slusser Memorial Philatelic Library (United States)
- Spellman Museum of Stamps & Postal History (United States)
- Smithsonian National Postal Museum (United States)
- The Philately Museum of Oaxaca (México)
- The Postal Museum (U.K.)
- The Royal Philatelic Society London (United Kingdom)
- Vincent Graves Greene Philatelic Research Foundation (The Harry Sutherland Philatelic Library, Canada)

== See also ==
- British Library Philatelic Department Photograph Collection
- International Philatelic Libraries Association
- List of philatelic magazines
- Philatelic literature
- Royal Philatelic Society London
