= Bernard Davis =

Bernard Davis may refer to:

- Bernard Davis (biologist) (1916–1994), American biologist
- Bernard Davis (politician), Canadian politician
- Bernard Davis (British Empire Medal holder) (1933–2015), awarded the British Empire Medal for risking his life rescuing a 3-year-old girl
- Bernard Davis (philanthropist) (1893–1973), Ukrainian-American philanthropist and former owner of the Miami Museum of Modern Art
- Bernard George Davis (1906–1972), American publishing executive
