= Charles Peterson (philatelist) =

American philatelist

Charles J. Peterson (7 December 1933 – 12 June 2009) was an American philatelist who signed the Roll of Distinguished Philatelists in 1991.

Peterson twice received the John N. Luff award and was editor of the American Philatelic Research Library's (APRL) Philatelic Literature Review and the United States Philatelic Classics Society’s Chronicle of the U.S. Classic Postal Issues. He was credited by the American Philatelic Society with originating the idea of competitive philatelic literature exhibitions. He was president of the Fédération Internationale de Philatélie's philatelic literature commission, and the APRL.

In 2008, he received the Alfred F. Lichtenstein Memorial Award for Distinguished Service to Philately.

The APS award the Charles J. Peterson Philatelic Literature Life Achievement Award in his memory. The award recognises one individual whose work has "furthered philatelic knowledge through philatelic literature".
