= David Louis Lidman =

Stamp historian (1905–1982)

- Born: July 11, 1905
- Died: September 18, 1982 (aged 77)
- Engineering career
- Institutions: American Philatelic Society
- Projects: Philatelic writer in journals and newspapers; founder of the APS Writers Unit 30
- Awards: Luff Award; APS Hall of Fame; APS Gold Medal

David Louis Lidman (July 11, 1905 – September 18, 1982) was an American writer of philatelic literature in journals, books and newspapers.

== Philatelic literature ==
Lidman wrote a number of books on stamp collecting, among them The New York Times Guide to Collecting Stamps (published in 1970), Treasury of Stamps: 1200 Rare and Beautiful Stamps in Color (published in 1975) and The World of Stamps and Collecting, which he co-authored with John Apfelbaum in 1981. He also wrote other books, including Philately Below Zero, A Postal History of Alaska (in 1958) and The First Day Cover Collector's Handbook (in 1976).

Lidman contributed philatelic articles to the Chicago Sun and The New York Times. He edited Chambers Stamps Journal, Philately, Essay-Proof Journal, The American Philatelist, The Congress Books, 1851 Centennial Book, U.S. Perforation Centennial Book, and other stamp publications.

== Philatelic activity ==
David Louis Lidman was active in philatelic societies. He was one of the founders of the APS Writers Unit 30 and was named its first president. At the American Philatelic Society (APS) he served as vice president. He also served as president of the Board of Trustees of the American Philatelic Research Library.

== Honors and awards ==
Lidman won numerous honors. He received the first Newbury Award in 1945 and in 1946 received the Luff Award. In 1981 he was elected to the Writers Hall of Fame. And, in 1971, he was presented the APS Gold Medal for outstanding contributions to the society. Lidman was named to the American Philatelic Society Hall of Fame in 1983.
