= Victor E. Engstrom =

American philatelist (1913–2000)

- Born: October 20, 1913
- Died: July 1, 2000 (aged 86)
- Engineering career
- Institutions: Scandinavian Collectors Club
- Projects: created stamp collections of the Nordic countries; expert on stamps of the Danish West Indies
- Awards: Luff Award; APS Hall of Fame

Victor E. Engstrom (20 October 1913 – July 1, 2000 Clearwater, FL) was an American philatelist known for his knowledge and collections of stamps of Nordic countries.

== Background ==
Engstrom came from Montclair, New Jersey. He was an Army veteran of World War II with the rank of colonel and served in military intelligence. He graduated from Lehigh University in 1936. He retired as president of a major building firm founded by his father.

== Collecting interests ==
Victor Engstrom was a student of postage stamps and postal history of Nordic countries and their possessions. He had a world-famous reputation for his knowledge and collection of postage stamps and postal history of the Danish West Indies.

== Philatelic activity ==
Victor Engstrom was a member of the Scandinavian Collectors Club, where he established the Danish West Indies Study Unit and wrote extensively on the Danish West Indies in the unit's journal. He was also editor-in-chief of the three volume Danish West Indies Mail 1754-1917, published from 1979 to 1982. Engstrom served various posts at the Scandinavian Collectors Club, including the office of president. He also edited the club's journal, The Posthorn.

== Selected works ==
- Danish West Indies Postal Stationery (The Scandinavian postal stationery lexicon)(Scandinavian Scribe. 1971)
- Danish West Indies Mails, 1754-1917. Volume I: Postal History (Scandinavian Printing and Publishing Company. 1979)
- Danish West Indies Mails, 1754-1917. Volume 2: The Postal Emissions(Scandinavian Printing and Publishing Company. 1981)

== Honors and awards ==
Engstrom received numerous awards for his expertise and his dedication to the growth of the hobby of stamp collecting. In 1975, he received the World Series Champion of Champions from the American Philatelic Society Hall of Fame. He received the Earl Grant Jacobson Award for research, the Carl Pelander Award for outstanding service, and the Eugene Klein Research Award from the American Philatelic Congress. He was honored by the United States Classics Society and received the Luff Award for Distinguished Philatelic Research in 1996. In 1997, he received the Distinguished Philatelist Award from the U.S. Philatelic Classics Society. He was named to the American Philatelic Society Hall of Fame in 2002.

== See also ==
- Philately
- Philatelic literature
