= Solomon Glass =

American philatelist (1893–1973)

- Born: March 8, 1893
- Died: March 7, 1973 (aged 79)
- Engineering career
- Institutions: Fédération Internationale de Philatélie; Baltimore Philatelic Society
- Projects: Served as president of the Baltimore Philatelic Society; wrote popular books on 20th century postage stamps
- Awards: APS Hall of Fame; Luff Award

Solomon Glass (March 8, 1893 – March 7, 1973), of Baltimore, Maryland, was a philatelist who was recognized as a foremost expert in United States postage stamps of the 20th century.

== Philatelic literature ==
Glass is known for his books United States Postage Stamps 1945–1952, published in 1954, and The Story of United Nations Postage Stamps, which was published in 1953 and subsequently re-issued as an official United Nations publication.

== Philatelic activity ==
Glass' philatelic activities were international. At the Fédération Internationale de Philatélie, he was its first American member of the Executive Board (1955). Glass was active in a number of philatelic organizations, including, the American Philatelic Society (Board of Vice-Presidents), American Philatelic Congress, and at the Bureau Issues Association, which is now renamed the United States Stamp Society.

At the Baltimore Philatelic Society, Glass served in a number of capacities, including president.

== Honors and awards ==
Glass received the Benjamin Franklin Award for Distinguished and Outstanding Public Service and the Luff Award in 1954 for Distinguished Philatelic Research. In 1966 he received the Medal for Distinguished Service from the Fédération Internationale de Philatélie, and in 1974 was named to the American Philatelic Society Hall of Fame.

== See also ==
- Philately
- Philatelic literature
