= Morton Dean Joyce =

American philatelist

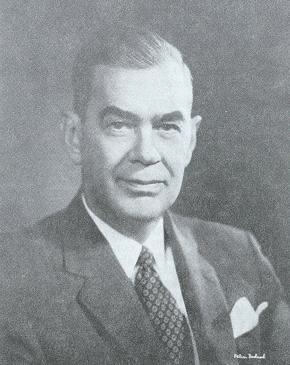
- Born: 1900
- Died: September 1989 (aged 88–89)
- Engineering career
- Institutions: Bureau Issues Association; American Philatelic Society; Booklet Pane Society; Collectors Club of New York
- Projects: Formed one of the most famous collections of revenue stamps of the United States
- Awards: Hopkinson Trophy; APS Hall of Fame; Southgate Trophy; USSC Hall of Fame

Morton Dean Joyce (1900–1989), of New York City, was a philatelist who specialized in the collection of United States revenue stamps and became known by his philatelic friends as the "Dean of United States revenue collectors."

== Collecting interests ==
Joyce was noted for his collecting and studying revenue stamps of the United States. However, his interests in United States postage stamps were more widespread and included classic postal issues.

Portions of Joyce's revenue collections, when placed on exhibit at FIPEX (Fifth International Philatelic Exhibition) in 1956, won the National Grand Prize, the first time ever that a "back-of-the-book" exhibit ever won so prestigious an award.

== Philatelic activity ==
Joyce was an active member of a number of stamp societies, including the Collectors Club of New York, where he was a member of the Board of Directors, and the American Philatelic Society. He was a founding member of the American Revenue Association and was also president of the Booklet Pane Society.

== Philatelic literature ==
Morton Joyce acquired the Butler and Carpenter letter books and made them available to philatelic researchers, and, in his will, he bequeathed them to the Smithsonian Institution, in Washington, D.C.

Joyce wrote numerous articles on the results of his studies of United States revenue stamps. In addition to authoring philatelic literature himself, he financially supported other authors and editors including the work of his friend George Townsend Turner in assembling Sloane's Column into book form. He also supported financially the publishing of United States Revenue Essays and Proofs.

== Legacy ==
The Morton Dean Joyce Collection of United States Revenue Stamps was sold at the Daniel F. Kelleher Company auction June 4 to 6, 1991 and by the auction house of Andrew Levitt, in Danbury, Connecticut, in six sessions from September 12 to 14. The latter auction contained 3,300 lots of Mr. Joyce's philatelic material.

A number of books and articles have been written on Joyce's collections. A description of a portion of Joyce's collection was published in 1991 by Andrew Levitt in a book entitled The Morton Dean Joyce Private Die Proprietary Collection. Another book, entitled Collector's handbook for private die proprietary proofs and census of the Morton Dean Joyce Collection of these issues was published by Richard Friedberg.

== Honors and awards ==
Joyce was recognized with numerous major philatelic awards, including the Hopkinson Trophy in 1957. The Bureau Issues Association, now renamed the United States Stamp Society (USSS), awarded him its first Southgate Trophy and named him to the USSS Hall of Fame. Morton Dean Joyce was named to the American Philatelic Society Hall of Fame in 2008.

== See also ==
- Philately
- Philatelic literature
