= Leo August =

- Born: March 2, 1914
- Died: December 4, 1997 (aged 83)
- Engineering career
- Institutions: American First Day Cover Society; National Postal Museum; American Philatelic Society
- Projects: Created the “White Ace” brand of albums for stamp collectors; created "ArtCraft" cachets for first day covers
- Awards: Luff Award; APS Hall of Fame

Leo August (March 2, 1914 – December 4, 1997), of New Jersey, was an American philatelist who, as a stamp dealer and publisher, created interest and awareness in the collection of first day covers through the introduction in 1939 of "ArtCraft" engraved illustrated (or "cacheted") envelopes for use as first day covers. He also established the landmark line of "White Ace" stamp albums. ArtCraft became one of the world's most popular cachets.

== Albums and cachets ==
In 1933 Leo and his brother Samuel formed the Washington Stamp Exchange on Washington Street in Newark, New Jersey. In 1939 they established the Washington Press, which created and sold White Ace album pages for collectors. They also printed and sold high-quality envelopes bearing an Artcraft (later "ArtCraft") cachet of each anticipated United States stamp to be issued, so that stamp collectors could have the envelope franked and canceled by the post office with a “first day of issue” cancellation.

== Philatelic philanthropy ==
Leo and his brother were very interested in expanding the hobby of collecting first day covers and helped found the American First Day Cover Society in 1955 and supported it financially during its early years. He also helped create interest for the hobby of first day covers by instituting awards at various stamp shows and exhibitions.

Leo was a benefactor of the Smithsonian Institution's National Postal Museum in Washington, D.C. and American Philatelic Society in Bellefonte, Pennsylvania, and one of the founders of the Cardinal Spellman Philatelic Museum on the campus of Regis College in Weston, Massachusetts.

== Honors and awards ==
Leo received numerous honors for his work in the field of philately. He was awarded the Luff Award in 1990 by the American Philatelic Society for outstanding contributions to philately, and was named Man of the Year in 1997 by the American First Day Cover Society. In 1998 he was named to the American Philatelic Society Hall of Fame.

== Legacy ==
The Leo and Samuel August Memorial Award for best topical first day cover exhibit is given on an annual basis by the American First Day Cover Society. And, in his will, Leo provided a large bequest to The American Philatelic Research Library. The

== See also ==
- Philately
