= Postage stamps and postal history of Greenland =

This is a survey of the postage stamps and postal history of Greenland.

Greenland is an autonomous country within the Kingdom of Denmark, located between the Arctic and Atlantic Oceans, east of the Canadian Arctic Archipelago.

== Pakke-Porto stamps ==
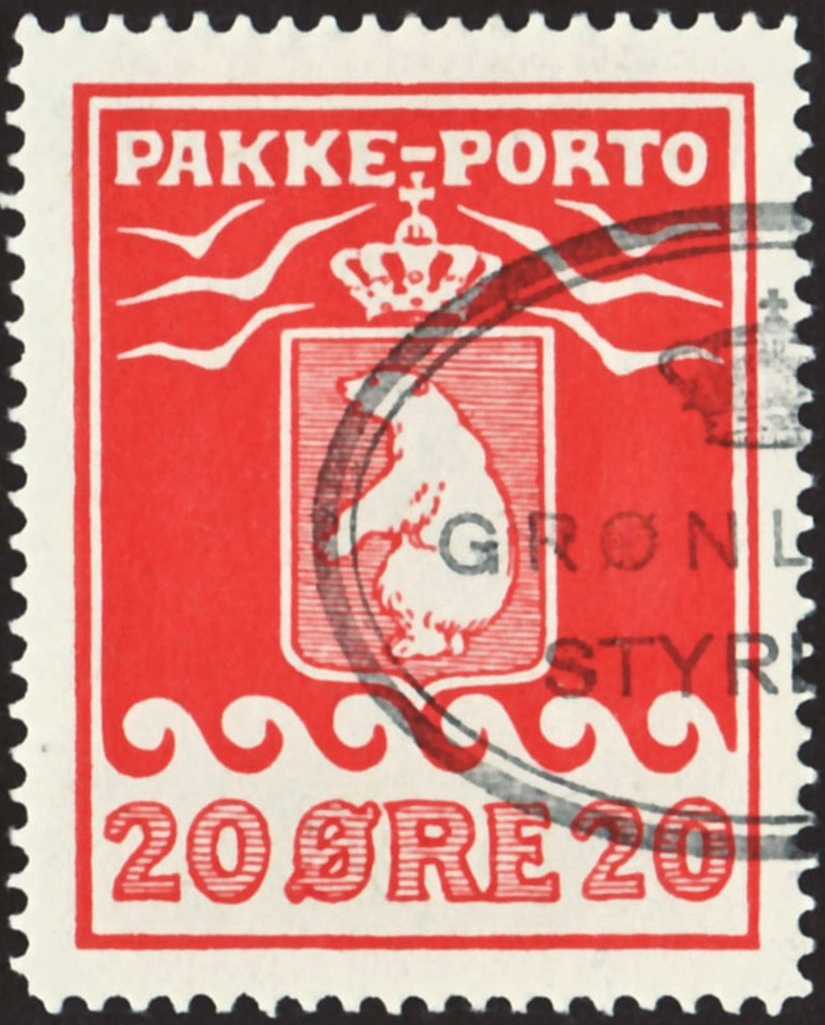
A Pakke-Porto stamp

Stamps were issued by the Kongelige Grønlandske Handel in 1905 for use as parcel stamps. The stamps showed the coat of arms of Greenland, featuring a standing polar bear. Letters were handled free of charge by the Kongelige Grønlandske Handel until 1938.

== First stamps ==
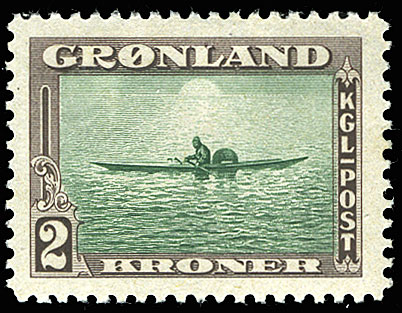
The 1945 series

In 1938, postal service was established and the first postage stamps of Greenland were issued on 1 December. The series consisted of five stamps with a portrait of the Danish king Christian X and two with the image of a polar bear.

== Later issues ==
In 1945, during the Second World War, a new set of stamps was printed by the American Bank Note Company. This series consisted of nine values, which in addition to King Christian X, also showed seals, Inuit in a kayak, dog sleds and polar bears.

On March 11, 1969, Greenland issued a stamp dedicated to the 70th birthday of King Frederik IX. For the first time, the name of the country was inscribed in two languages, Danish and Greenlandic.

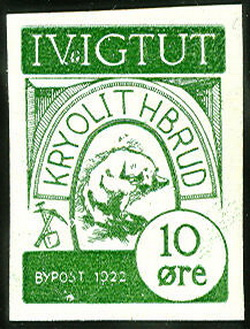
A stamp issued in Ivigtût

== Local issues ==
=== Ivigtut ===
In 1922, in the town of Ivigtût (located in the southwestern part of Greenland, now abandoned), a green stamp with the image of a polar bear and the inscription “Ivigtut Kryolithbrud Bypost 1922" (Ivigtut Cryolite Mining Local mail 1922) was issued by the local mining company providing mail delivery to the small town.

The legitimacy of these stamps is strongly questioned, and are believed to have been created by American stamp collector Brad Arch in the 1960s.

=== Thule ===
Stamps were issued in 1935 for the remote settlement of Thule in North Star Bay, in the northernmost area of Greenland, founded by Knud Rasmussen. The series was issued on the 25th anniversary of the founding of the settlement and depicted Knud Rasmussen, the Danish flag, walruses and local scenery. The stamps were valid for mail from Thule to Copenhagen.

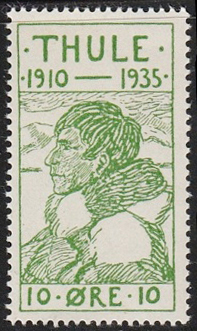
Knud Rasmussen

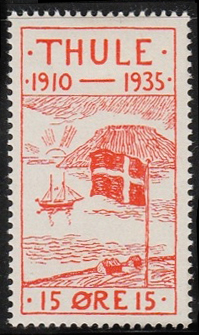
Danish flag at Thule

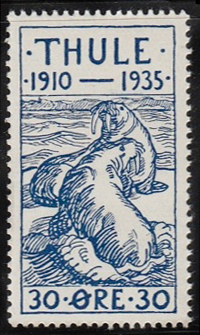
Walruses

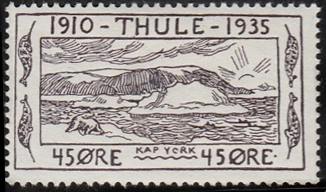
Cape York

== See also ==
- Facit Catalog
- Postage stamps and postal history of Denmark
- Scandinavian Collectors Club
- Scandinavia Philatelic Society
