= Hugh McLellan Southgate =

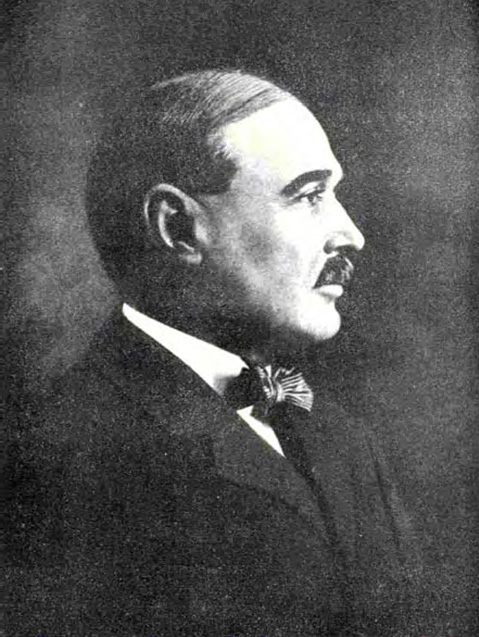
- circa 1920
- Born: September 3, 1871
- Died: October 23, 1940 (aged 69)
- Engineering career
- Institutions: Philatelic Plate Number Association; Bureau Issues Association; American Philatelic Society
- Projects: Student and expert on Bureau Issues active within the Washington, D.C., philatelic community
- Awards: APS Hall of Fame

Hugh McLellan Southgate (September 3, 1871 – October 23, 1940), of Washington, D.C., was an avid stamp collector, active in the Washington area as well as on the national level.

== Collecting interests ==
Southgate was a student and expert of the Bureau Issues of the United States.

== Philatelic activity ==
In addition to participating in philatelic activities in the Washington, D.C. area, Southgate was a founder of the Philatelic Plate Number Association and was its president from 1926 to 1928. At the Bureau Issues Association (now the United States Stamp Society) he was its first president and chairman of the board (1939–1940). Southgate was also active in the American Philatelic Society and was one of the first to investigate and study the archives of the Bureau of Engraving and Printing.

== Hugh M. Southgate Memorial Trophy ==
The Hugh M. Southgate Memorial Trophy, also known as the Southgate Trophy, was established by the United States Stamp Society in November 1968 as its most important award for 19th century exhibiting. Winner of the trophy include Morton Dean Joyce, Henry M. Gobie, William M. Fitch, Cortlande Clarke and Eliot Landau.

== Honors and awards ==
Hugh Southgate was named to the American Philatelic Society Hall of Fame in 1941.

== See also ==
- Philately
