= Ernst Max Cohn =

- Born: March 31, 1920
- Died: December 30, 2004 (aged 84)
- Engineering career
- Institutions: American Philatelic Society
- Projects: Wrote books and articles on postal history; served in various philatelic societies
- Awards: Lichtenstein Medal; APS Hall of Fame; Luff Award

Ernst Max Cohn (March 31, 1920 – December 30, 2004), was a multi-lingual philatelic researcher and expert from Alabama, who advocated re-researching original philatelic sources rather than relying on subsequent published philatelic literature.

== Collecting interests ==
Cohn was particularly interested in the siege mail of the Franco-German War of 1870–71 although his collecting interests were previously more widespread.

== Philatelic literature ==
Ernst Cohn authored a number of books during his philatelic career, including: Die “Papillons” von Metz (1976), The Flight of the “Ville d’Orleans (1978), Ordinary Mail by Diplomatic Means (1995), Unusual Mail in Occupied France 1870–1871 (2000), and A Book of Postal History (1988) which contained many of his articles he had previously written for The American Philatelist.

== Philatelic activity ==
Cohn was a member of the most important philatelic societies in the United States, France, Belgium and the United Kingdom. At the American Philatelic Society, he served a number of posts, including representative to the FIP Postal History Commission and on the Postal History Committee. At the Postal History Society he held a number of posts including president and associate editor.

== Honors and awards ==
Ernst Cohn was awarded the Luff Award for distinguished philatelic research in 1995 and the Lichtenstein award for distinguished service to philately in 2004. He received recognition for his work from the American Philatelic Congress, the Fédération Internationale des Sociétés Aérophilatéliques (FISA), the Fédération Internationale de Philatélie (FIP), and others.

He was named to the American Philatelic Society Hall of Fame in 2006.
