= Robert Laurenson Dashiell Davidson =

Dr. Robert Laurenson Dashiell Davidson
- Born: January 11, 1909
- Died: June 20, 1998 (aged 89)
- Engineering career
- Institutions: Smithsonian Institution; American Philatelic Society; U.S. Philatelic Classics Society
- Projects: Distinguished Philatelic Lecturer at the Smithsonian Institution; Director of the American Philatelic Society
- Awards: Luff Award; APS Hall of Fame

Dr. Robert Laurenson Dashiell Davidson (January 11, 1909 – June 20, 1998), of Missouri, was an active philatelist in the Missouri area, and also at the national level.

== Philatelic activity ==
Davidson was active in encouraging and promoting philately in the St. Louis, Missouri, area and throughout the state. Because of his organizational and managerial talent, he served in various capacities in a number of national philatelic societies, such as the American Philatelic Society (APS), where he was director from 1971 to 1976, and also chaired the Literature Committee. Named as the APS Historian, Davidson wrote a history of the society and made it available in 1986 at the society's centenary celebration. At the American Philatelic Research Library, Davidson was an original trustee, and later, he served as its president.

At the Smithsonian Institution in Washington, D.C., Davidson was named a Distinguished Philatelic Lecturer.

== Philatelic literature ==
At the U.S. Philatelic Classics Society Davidson was editor and contributor to its philatelic journal, The Chronicle of U.S. Classic Postal Issues.

== Honors and awards ==
Davidson was awarded the Luff Award for Outstanding Service to Philately in 1985. He was named to the American Philatelic Society Hall of Fame in 1999.

== See also ==
- Philately
- Philatelic literature
