= Nancy B. Clark =

American philatelist (1946–2024)

- Born: 1946
- Died: January 29, 2024 (aged 77)
- Organizations: President of Cardinal Spellman Philatelic Museum; American Philatelic Society; Royal Philatelic Society London; Georgia Federation of Stamp Clubs Service Award; Luff Award
- Known for: Helped advance stamp collecting among the Boy Scouts and other youth groups; founded and served in many philatelic organizations

Nancy B. Clark (December 11, 1946 – January 29, 2024) was an American philatelist who served the philatelic community by her pioneering work with the Boy Scouts of America and her dedication to work at the American Philatelic Society. Clark died on January 29, 2024, at the age of 77.

== Philatelic activity ==
Nancy Clark, during her philatelic career, has dedicated much of her time to children, developing in them an interest in stamp collecting. She assisted Boy Scout groups with philatelic activities that led to boys obtaining badges for stamp collecting. She also introduced stamp collecting to grammar school students and helped them develop skills in exhibiting their displays of stamps.

Clark was very active with both the national and international philatelic organizations. She was a member of the American Philatelic Society where she served on various committees, was director at large, and appointed society treasurer. She was a Fellow of the Royal Philatelic Society London. She was appointed Interpretive Master Planner for the Spellman Museum of Stamps and Postal History in 2010.

Clark served as president of the show committee for World Stamp Show Boston 2026, until 2022, when she became emerita.

Clark also hosted APS Stamp Talk with Nancy Clark, an online radio show that aired multiple times a year and featured guests from organized philately for seventeen years.

On the local level, Clark served in numerous positions in various organizations. At the Rochester Philatelic Association she served as president and vice president. She was one of the founders of Georgia Federation of Stamp Clubs, the Peach State Stamp Show, and the Auxiliary Markings Club. She served as secretary of the Massachusetts Postal Research Society and as president and treasurer of the Mobile Post Office Society.

== Philatelic literature ==
Clark was a prolific writer of philatelic articles which appeared in The American Philatelist, the American Philatelic Congress books, Scott Stamp Monthly, and other philatelic publications.

Clark served as a philatelic literature judge at Chicagopex 2017 in Itasca, Illinois. And was both an international FIP juror and a Chief Judge in stamps and literature in the United States.

== Community involvement ==
Clark acted in supporting public libraries, serving on the board for libraries in two states: Cliffside Park in New Jersey, and Oglethorpe County and Athens-Clarke County in Georgia. She wrote book reviews for The Oglethorpe Echo newspaper for several years.

Clark worked on and chaired historic preservation commissions in Georgia and Massachusetts: City of Oglethorpe, GA, and Town of Barnstable, MA.

Clark published a children's book authored by her husband, Douglas Clark, and mother-in-law Eleanor Linton Clark and illustrated by her sister-in-law, Broadway designer Peggy Clark Kelly in 2002. She worked on a book about interrupted mail traveling by rail.

== Honors and awards ==
Clark received awards for her work including the Georgia Federation of Stamp Clubs Service Award, the Rowland Hill Lifetime Achievement Award of the Southeast Federation of Stamp Clubs, the APS Ernest Kehr Award, and the Clyde Jennings Award of the Errors, Freaks, and Oddities Collectors Club.

In 2008 Clark received the Luff Award for Exceptional Contributions to Philately from the American Philatelic Society.

In 2018 she received the Neinkin Award from the Philatelic Foundation, recognizing meritorious service to philately.
