= Rocky Mountain Philatelic Library =

Public library on stamps, stamp collecting, and postal history

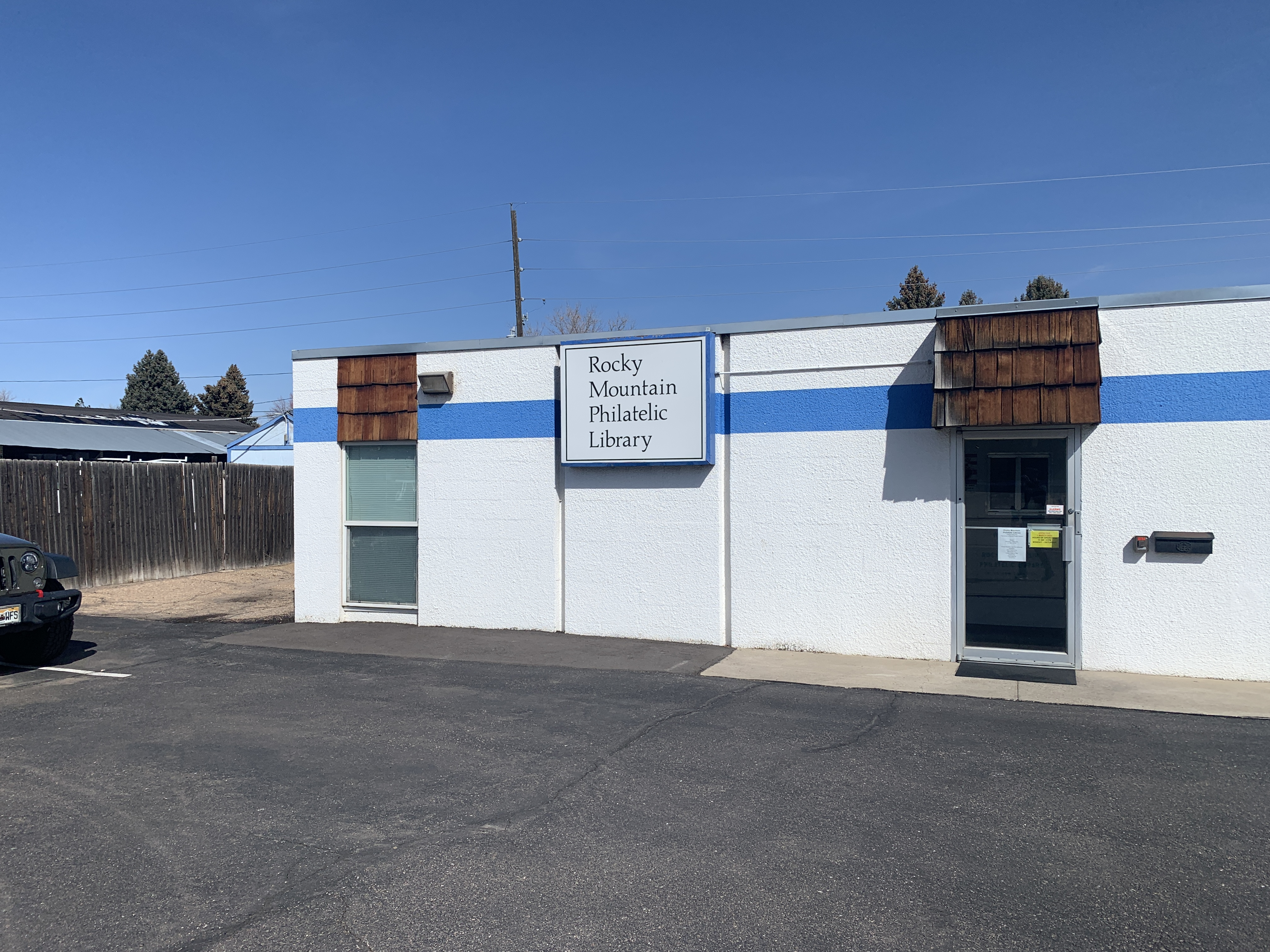
- Exterior view of the Rocky Mountain Philatelic Library building in March 2022
- 39°40′32″N 104°54′02″W
- Location: Denver, Colorado, U.S.
- Type: Philatelic library
- Scope: Western history
- Established: August 1, 1993 (33 years ago)

Collection
- Specialization: Colorado postal history
- Items collected: Books, catalogs, periodicals, auction catalogs
- Size: 800+ stamp catalogs, ~1,500 periodicals, 2,000+ auction catalogs

Access and use
- Access requirements: Free to access, membership dues to checkout items

Other information
- Director: Tonny Van Loij (President)
- Affiliation: Scandinavian Collectors Club, Society for Czechoslovak Philately, Postal Stationary Society
- Public transit access: S Quebec St & Evans Ave, Regional Transportation District
- Website: www.rockymountainphilateliclibrary.org

The Rocky Mountain Philatelic Library is a privately funded public library in Denver, Colorado.

== History ==
The library opened on 1 August 1993. A number of moves followed but eventually on 3 August 1996 it opened at its current premises which it owns outright.

== Legal status ==
The library is a chartered Colorado non-profit corporation with 501(c)(3) status with the United States Internal Revenue Service. The library is a public charity and donations are treated as a charitable deduction for the purposes of United States Federal Income Tax.

== Collections ==
In addition to the main collection of philatelic literature, maps, auction catalogues, journals and clippings, the library is home to several specialist collections and club collections. These include the Western History and Railroad collection and the Scandinavian Collectors Club library. The holdings of the library are included in the Philatelic Union Catalog, a partnership formed by the Smithsonian National Postal Museum, hosted by the American Philatelic Research Library.

== Staff and facilities ==
The library is entirely staffed by volunteers. The library has a dedicated room for society meetings and several local societies hold their regular meetings at the library. There is also a successful stamp sales division. In 2009 an additional building was purchased adjacent to the existing premises and which doubled the library's available space.

== Outreach and programs ==
In 2022, the library began a program that awards a Special Delivery of Dreams Scholarship to four students committed to community outreach and philately. The library hosts monthly meetings of the Colorado Young Philatelic Explorers and Researchers (CYPHER) Stamp Club.
