= Mary Ann Aspinwall Owens =

American stamp collector and advocate

- Born: June 24, 1928
- Died: November 21, 2005 (aged 77)
- Engineering career
- Institutions: American Philatelic Society
- Projects: Advocated the acceptance of thematic collecting as a valid component of philately
- Awards: APS Hall of Fame

Mary Ann Aspinwall Owens (June 24, 1928 – November 21, 2005), of New York City, was an advocate of thematic collecting of postage stamps, such as collecting stamps showing birds, ships or famous art. She helped introduce thematic collecting into national and international philatelic exhibitions.

== Collecting interests ==
Owens was a collector of thematic subjects on stamps, and was a pioneer in getting the philatelic community to accept thematic collecting as a valid branch of philately. She exhibited her collections at national and international philatelic events, and won numerous gold prizes. Her exhibit of “elephants on stamps” was the first thematic exhibit to win gold and large gold according to the American Hall of Fame.

== Philatelic activity ==
Owens served on the Citizens' Stamp Advisory Committee . She was accredited as a thematic judge by the American Topical Association, the American Philatelic Society, and the Fédération Internationale de Philatélie, and served as judge at many shows.

== Honors and awards ==
In 1969 she was awarded the Distinguished Topical Philatelist Award by the American Topical Association, and, in 1978, she was elected to the Wisconsin Philatelic Hall of Fame. In 1991 she received the Luff Award of the American Philatelic Society in the category Exceptional Contributions to Philately. She was named to the American Philatelic Society Hall of Fame in 2007.

== See also ==
- Philately
- Philatelic literature
- Theodore E. Steinway
