= Charles C. Cratsenberg =

American philatelist

- Born: August 1, 1903
- Died: January 27, 1995 (aged 91)
- Spouse: Treva Clayton Cratsenberg
- Children: Marilyn Jane Cratsenberg McDonough
- Parent(s): Frank Erie Cratsenberg and Minnie E. Headington
- Engineering career
- Institutions: American Philatelic Society; Trans Mississippi Philatelic Society; Iowa and Illinois Federations of Stamp Clubs
- Projects: Contributed to philately on a local and national level; helped track down forger Raoul Ch. De Thuin
- Awards: Luff Award; APS Hall of Fame

Charles C. Cratsenberg (August 1, 1903 – January 27, 1995), of Illinois and Arizona, was a dedicated stamp collector who served philately by active participation in major philatelic organizations.

== Philatelic activity ==
Cratsenberg was an active participant in local stamp collecting clubs. He served the Trans Mississippi Philatelic Society as president and held offices in the Iowa and Illinois Federations of Stamp Clubs. At the national level, Cratsenberg served as president of the American Philatelic Society (APS), from 1957 to 1961, and helped coordinate and manage the transitional changes that occurred within the society caused by its move to State College, Pennsylvania. He also helped found the APS Writers Unit 30, and was named to the "Committee of Five" to investigate and track down counterfeiter Raoul Ch. De Thuin, an effort that was successful and described in the 1974 APS publication, The Yucatán Affair.

== Honors and awards ==
In 1961 Charles C. Cratsenberg received the Luff Award in 1961 for Outstanding Service to the Society, and, inn 1962, he was elected to the Arizona State Philatelic Hall of Fame. Because of his dedicated service to the American Philatelic Society, he was named to the American Philatelic Society Hall of Fame in 1996.

== See also ==
- Philately
