= David Beech =

British philatelist

David Richard Beech
- Born: 1954 (age 71–72)
- Occupation: Philatelist

David Richard Beech MBE (born 1954) was the curator of the British Library Philatelic Collections from 1983–2013. He is a fellow and past president of the Royal Philatelic Society London (RPSL). In 2013, it was announced that Beech was to receive the Smithsonian Philatelic Achievement Award for outstanding lifetime accomplishments in the field of philately.

== Early life ==
David Beech was born in 1954. As a child, he collected British private post stamps including railway stamps, college stamps, British circular delivery companies and bus parcel stamps but he ceased personally collecting stamps when he joined the philatelic auctioneers H. R. Harmer Limited in 1970. He is a cousin to John Holman.

== Career at the British Library ==
Beech became a curator at the British Library in 1983 where one of his first tasks was to build up a philatelic reference library which had increased to approximately 10,000 volumes by 2003. He became head of the Philatelic Collection in 1991.

== Organised philately ==
Beech is active in organised philately. In 1974 he became a member of the Exhibition Committee of the British Philatelic Exhibition and in 1980 he became a Council member of the British Philatelic Federation and subsequently of the Association of British Philatelic Societies. He was a member of the Council of the National Philatelic Society from 1981 to 1996. He was the Controller of Exhibits for the International Philatelic Exhibition London 1980 and a member of the Philatelic Committee and Court of Honour Design Group for Stamp World London 90. He is a member of The Royal Philatelic Society of New Zealand, The Royal Philatelic Society of Canada, the Collectors Club of New York, the American Philatelic Research Library and the Académie Europeénne de Philatélie. He is also a Trustee of the Revenue Philately Trust.

He was president of the Royal Philatelic Society from 2003 to 2005. In 2012, he was awarded the MBE for services to philately and in 2013 the Smithsonian Institution Philatelic Achievement Award "for outstanding lifetime accomplishments in the field of philately".

Beech was a joint founder of the International Philatelic Libraries Association.

== The Grinnell Missionary stamps ==
Beech was instrumental in the Grinnell Missionary stamps being expertised by the Royal Philatelic Society London in 2002 to 2004 and arranged access to the Missionary stamps held in the Tapling Collection at the British Library.

== Selected publications ==
=== Books ===
- New Zealand and Dependencies – A Philatelic Bibliography, Thames, New Zealand, 2004. (With Allan P. Berry & Robin M. Startup) ISBN 0-476-00516-7

=== Articles ===
- "Philatelic research at the British Library", Cross Post, The Friends of Postal Heritage, 10 (3), 2004, pp. 119–128. Download link.
- "Stamp albums in the Printed Book Collections of the British Library", Philatelic Literature Review, American Philatelic Research Library, 54 (1st quarter), 2005, pp. 16–24..
- "New Zealand Philately at the British Library" in The New Zealand Stamp Collector, The Royal Philatelic Society of New Zealand and The New Zealand Philatelic Federation, 85, 2005, pp. 38–41..
- "The British Library Philatelic Collections 1998 to 2005" a paper given at a meeting of the Royal Philatelic Society London, 17 November 2005..
- "Philatelic Research – a basic guide" in Stamp Lover, National Philatelic Society, 100, 2008, pp. 101–104..
- Great Britain and Ireland: The Carriage of Parcels by Tramway and Omnibus: Services and Stamps. London: British Library, 2008.
- "Notes for philatelic researchers" in The London Philatelist, The Royal Philatelic Society London, 118, 2009, pp. 8–11..
- "The Printing Plate of the Mauritius 1847 Post Office Issue" in The London Philatelist, Vol. 121, No. 1392, Jan/Feb 2012, pp. 2–9.
