= Joseph M. Clary =

- Born: January 18, 1905; Florence, Colorado
- Died: August 8, 1996 (aged 91)
- Engineering career
- Institutions: American Philatelic Society; California Collectors Club
- Projects: Chairman of the American Philatelic Society Convention Committee from 1961 to 1979
- Awards: Luff Award; APS Hall of Fame

Joseph M. Clary (January 18, 1905 – August 8, 1996), of San Francisco, California, was a philatelist who dedicated himself to the advancement of the hobby of stamp collecting in California and on a national scale.

== California philatelic efforts ==
Clary was one of the founders of the California Collectors Club in 1937. He was a member of a number of stamp clubs in the San Francisco area and was active in their activities. He was celebrated for his role, starting in 1960, as a director for the philatelic exhibition WESTPEX.

== National efforts ==
Clary was active within the American Philatelic Society (APS), served as director-at-large and as vice president, and was responsible for overseeing the transfer of the Sales Division to its current location in State College, Pennsylvania. He was also chairman of the APS Convention Committee from 1961 to 1979 and was responsible for the APS organizing its own conventions and philatelic exhibitions. The first show was the 91st APS Convention, held in 1977 in San Francisco, and Clary was its chairman.

== Honors and awards ==
Clary was awarded the Luff Award for Outstanding Service to the Society in 1964, and, in 1997, he was named to the American Philatelic Society Hall of Fame.

== See also ==
- Philately
