= John E. Foxworth Jr. =

American philatelist

- Born: April 6, 1932
- Died: February 25, 1998 (aged 65)
- Engineering career
- Institutions: American Philatelic Society
- Projects: Served as an official in various philatelic organizations
- Awards: Luff Award; APS Hall of Fame

John E. Foxworth Jr. (April 6, 1932 – February 25, 1998), of Michigan, was a philatelist who served in various organizations which advocated and supported the hobby of philately.

== Philatelic activity ==
Foxworth was very active within the philatelic community. He served the American Philatelic Society (APS) in a number of elective positions, including director, secretary, and president. He also served as president of the APS Writers Unit. At the American Philatelic Research Library he served as trustee and, later, president. and, at the Council of Philatelic Organizations, he was one of the founding members and the first president.

Foxworth also served on the Citizens' Stamp Advisory Committee.

== Honors and awards ==
Foxworth received the Luff Award in 1983 for Outstanding Service to the Society. He was named to the American Philatelic Society Hall of Fame in 1999.
