= Hargest =

Hargest may refer to:

== People ==
- Brandon Hargest, member of Jump5 (American Christian music group)
- Brigadier James Hargest CBE
- Brittany Hargest (born August 2, 1988, in Durham, North Carolina)
- George E. Hargest (1906–1983), philatelist of Florida

== Other ==
- Hargest, New Zealand, a suburb of Invercargill, New Zealand
  - James Hargest College, a large school in the suburb
