= John McCaslin =

American journalist

John McCaslin (born October 31, 1957) is an American newspaperman, broadcaster and author. He is the former co-anchor of America’s Morning News, produced by Talk Radio Network. On a daily basis for nearly two decades, he penned the syndicated political column titled Inside the Beltway.

== Personal life ==
McCaslin was born in Alexandria, Virginia, the son of senior FBI special agent Robert W. McCaslin. He graduated from Old Dominion University in 1980 with a degree in speech communication.

== Career ==
McCaslin began his journalism career in 1980 in Kalispell, Montana, working as news director and anchor of radio station KOFI-AM. From 1982 to 1984 he was news director and anchor of Bee Broadcasting, Inc. stations KJJR-AM and KBBZ-FM in Whitefish, Montana. He was also an award-winning correspondent for United Press International and stringer for NBC and ABC.

In 1984, McCaslin joined The Washington Times as a White House correspondent, working under Jeremiah A. O’Leary. For two years, he covered the war in Nicaragua from Washington, Miami and Managua. His other beats included the U.S. Justice Department and U.S. Congress. He was appointed assistant national editor, and became metropolitan editor when DC Mayor Marion Barry was the target of a federal investigation and indictment. In 1992 he began penning Inside the Beltway, which was later syndicated by the Los Angeles Times Syndicate and Chicago’s Tribune Media Services and was hosted on wsRadio in 2008–2009. His writings have appeared in a number of national publications. His cover stories for Capitol File magazine have featured Katie Couric, Katherine Heigl, Mira Sorvino, Padma Lakshmi, Kerry Washington, and Lauren Graham. He has also been a travel writer, filing extensively from around the world.

McCaslin has been a regular guest of MSNBC’s Hardball with Chris Matthews, Fox News Channel’s Fox & Friends, C-SPAN’s Washington Journal and Booknotes with Brian Lamb, National Public Radio’s Weekend Edition Sunday, and the BBC. He has been guest host for Rush Limbaugh, Mary Matalin, Sam Donaldson, Oliver North and Michael Reagan, among other syndicated radio hosts. In 2009, McCaslin was tapped by the Talk Radio Network to be co-host of America's Morning News, syndicated to 200-plus stations around the country and featuring interviews with U.S. presidents and politicians to Hollywood elites and national sports figures. McCaslin resigned as co-host in 2013. In 2014, McCaslin joined the digital news startup Styrk as director of content. In January 2017, he became editor of the Rappahannock News, published since 1877 in Little Washington, Virginia. In September 2022, he became a columnist for the Flathead Beacon in Kalispell.

== Books ==
External videos
- Booknotes interview with McCaslin on Inside the Beltway, October 17, 2004, C-SPAN
- After Words interview with McCaslin on Weed Man, August 22, 2009, C-SPAN

- Weed Man: The Remarkable Journey of Jimmy Divine (2009)
- Inside the Beltway: Offbeat Stories, Scoops and Shenanigans from Around the Nation’s Capitol (2004)
- Chicken Soup for the Grandma's Soul (2006)
