= Foxworth =

Foxworth may refer to:

== Foxworth (surname) ==
- Domonique Foxworth (born 1983), retired American football player
- Jaimee Foxworth (born 1979), American actress, model, singer and former pornographic film actress
- Josephine "Jo" Foxworth (1918–2006), American advertising executive
- John E. Foxworth, Jr. (1932-1998), philatelist from Michigan
- Percy E. Foxworth (1906-1943), served as chief of the FBI's Special Intelligence Service
- Robert Heath Foxworth (born 1941), American film, stage, and television actor

== Places ==
- Foxworth, Mississippi
