= National Philatelic Museum =

National Philatelic Museum may refer to

- National Philatelic Museum, New Delhi
- National Philatelic Museum, Philadelphia
