= Barbara R. Mueller =

American philatelist

Barbara Ruth Mueller
- Born: September 10, 1925; Jefferson, Wisconsin
- Died: November 17, 2016 (aged 91); Madison, Wisconsin
- Engineering career
- Institutions: United States Stamp Society; American Philatelic Society
- Projects: Studied philatelic subjects; an acclaimed writer of philatelic literature
- Awards: USSS Hall of Fame; Luff Award; Lichtenstein Medal; Smithsonian Philatelic Achievement Award; Roll of Distinguished Philatelists

Barbara Ruth Mueller (September 10, 1925 – November 17, 2016) was an American philatelist.

== Philatelic activity ==
Mueller's interests lay in philately of the United States. She created various collections as part of her studies, such as her collection of Pomeroy's Express labels.

Mueller was very active in American philately. She was a life member of the American Philatelic Society (APS), having been a member for 65 years. She also had served the United States Stamp Society, chairing a number of committees and contributing to, and editing, the society’s journal, The United States Specialist from 1972 through 1977. At the National Postal Museum at the Smithsonian Institution in Washington, D.C., she worked on the files of former Post Office department executive Arthur M. Travers.

From 1986 to 1990, Mueller was editor of the American Philatelic Congress Book and, from 1963 to 1993, editor of the Essay Proof Journal.

== Publications ==
Barbara Mueller authored a number of publications. Her book Common Sense Philately was published in 1956. Based on her detailed studies, she published various detailed studies, such as John E. Javit, American Engraver and Printer.

== Honors and awards ==
Mueller received many awards for her writings, including the McCoy award, the Luff Award in 1956, the Lichtenstein Medal in 1981, and the Smithsonian Philatelic Achievement Award. She has been named to the United States Stamp Society Hall of Fame and the APS Writers Unit 30 Hall of Fame, and she was invited to sign the Roll of Distinguished Philatelists in July 2009.

== Barbara R. Mueller Award ==
The Barbara R. Mueller Award for the best article published each year in the APS monthly journal American Philatelist, was established in 2007 by the United States Stamp Society in Mueller's honor.

== See also ==
- Philately
- Philatelic literature
