= Lester George Brookman =

American stamp dealer (1904–1971)

- Born: September 3, 1904
- Died: November 23, 1971 (aged 67)
- Engineering career
- Projects: Expert on 19th century United States postage stamps
- Awards: APS Hall of Fame; Luff Award twice

Lester George Brookman (September 3, 1904 – November 23, 1971), of Minnesota, was a stamp dealer who was an expert on 19th century United States postage stamps and postal history.

== Stamp dealer ==
Brookman started his business of selling stamps in 1934. He published the Brookman's U.S. Price List, which was used as a standard pricing tool by stamp dealers for many years.

== Philatelic literature ==
Brookman published his most significant work, The United States Postage Stamps of the 19th Century, in three volumes from 1947 to 1967 for which he was awarded the Grand Award. From 1941 to 1945 Brookman was editor of the philatelic journal, The American Philatelist.

== Honors and awards ==
Brookman received the Luff Award in 1946 for Exceptional Contributions to Philately and again in 1948 for Distinguished Philatelic Research. In 1968 he was awarded the Grand Award by the American Philatelic Society's Writer's Unit 30. He signed the Roll of Distinguished Philatelists in 1950 and was named to the American Philatelic Society Hall of Fame in 1972.

== See also ==
- Philately
- Philatelic literature

== References and sources ==
Sources

- Lester George Brookman
- APS Writers Unit #30 Hall of Fame
