= Varro Eugene Tyler =

American professor of pharmacognosy and philatelist (1926–2001)

- Born: December 19, 1926
- Died: August 22, 2001 (aged 74)
- Occupation: Professor of Pharmacognosy
- Known for: Studied and wrote about forged postage stamps and the forgers who created them
- Honors: Distinguished Economic Botanist Award (1995); Luff Award (1998); APS Hall of Fame (2003)

Varro Eugene Tyler (December 19, 1926 – August 22, 2001), of Auburn, Nebraska, was an American professor of pharmacognosy and philatelist who specialized in the study of forged postage stamps and the forgers who created them.

== Academic career ==
Tyler graduated in pharmacy from the University of Nebraska in 1949, attended Yale University as an Eli Lilly Research Fellow and received M.S. and Ph.D. degrees from the University of Connecticut in 1951 and 1953.

Dr. Tyler was appointed associate professor and chairman of the Department of Pharmacognosy at the University of Nebraska and held similar positions at the University of Washington. Dr. Tyler accepted the appointment as dean of the School of Pharmacy and Pharmaceutical Sciences at Purdue University in 1966 and was closely associated with the Purdue University for the rest of his career.

His research interests included medicinal and toxic constituents of higher fungi, phytochemical analysis, alkaloid biosynthesis, drug plant cultivation, and herbal medicine.

According to his opinion "true herbalism encompasses scientific testing, honest reporting of the results, and safe use of effective herbs by informed practitioners and the public". He was opposed to what he called "paraherbalism" or "herbalism based on pseudoscience".

== Philately ==
Tyler initially specialized in the postage stamps of Japan, and studied forged copies of classic Japanese stamps.

He wrote substantial literature on stamp forgery, including Philatelic Forgers: Their Lives and Works (1976; revised and expanded in 1991) and a regular feature in Linn's Stamp News which was compiled as the book Focus on Forgeries: A Guide to Forgeries of Common Stamps (2000).

During his long association with the International Society for Japanese Philately, Tyler co-authored a number of monographs on forged Japanese stamps: Forgeries and Imitations of the Dragon Stamps of Japan (1971), The Wada Cherry Blossom Forgeries (1974), and The Koban Forgeries of Japan (1979).

"Tip" Tyler chaired the American Philatelic Society's Committee on Fakes and Forgeries from its inception in 1992 until 1998. He also conducted classes at the American Philatelic Society on "Detecting Fakes and Forgeries."

He was awarded the Meritorious Service Award of the Korea Stamp Society and the Luff Award for Distinguished Philatelic Research in 1998. He was named to the American Philatelic Society Hall of Fame in 2003.

== See also ==
- Philately
- Philatelic literature
