= W. Danforth Walker =

American philatelist

- Occupation: Philatelist

W. Danforth "Dan" Walker is an American philatelist who in 2014 was elected to the Roll of Distinguished Philatelists. Walker is a specialist in the philately of Grenada. Previously he received the American Philatelic Society Luff Award in 2003 for Outstanding Service to the Society. Walker is a philatelic judge and was on the international jury for Praga 2018 and for Chicagopex 2019.
