= Barbara Müller =

Barbara Müller or Mueller may refer to:

- Barbara Mueller (athlete) (born 1933), American hurdler
- Barbara Warren (1943–2008), née Müller, Austrian-American counselor, model, actress, author, and triathlete
- Barbara R. Mueller (1925–2016), American philatelist
- Barbara Müller (rower) (born 1937), East German rower
- Barbara Müller (footballer) (born 1983), German footballer in 2002 FIFA U-19 Women's World Championship
