= Holland Archer Davis =

Dr. Holland Archer Davis
- Born: June 6, 1869
- Died: December 27, 1955 (aged 86)
- Engineering career
- Institutions: American Philatelic Society; Denver Stamp Club
- Projects: Secretary of the American Philatelic Society; President of the Denver Stamp Club
- Awards: APS Hall of Fame; Luff Award

Dr. Holland Archer Davis (June 6, 1869 – December 27, 1955), of Denver, Colorado, was an ardent stamp collector who served the philatelic community in various positions.

== Collecting interests ==
Dr. Davis had numerous stamp collections. He wrote a monograph entitled U.S. 1887 3-cent Vermillion in 1922.

== Philatelic activity ==
Davis maintained the position of Secretary of the American Philatelic Society for a period of 30 years, from 1916 to 1945. Besides being the founding member of the United States Revenue Society (later renamed the American Revenue Association), he was President of the Denver Stamp Club for a number of years.

== Honors and awards ==
Davis received the Luff Award in 1954 for Exceptional Contributions to Philately, and was admitted to the American Philatelic Society Hall of Fame in 1956.

== See also ==
- Philately
- Philatelic literature
