= Peter P. McCann =

American philatelist

- Organization(s): American Philatelic Society; Royal Philatelic Society London; Philatelic Foundation; National Postal Museum
- Known for: President of various national philatelic societies; served as judge at 125 national philatelic events
- Awards: Roll of Distinguished Philatelists; Luff Award; Phoenix Award

Peter P. McCann, of Sarasota, Florida, is a philatelist who has supported the hobby of philately on a national scale. For his varied services to the American Philatelic Society (APS) over several decades, he was awarded in 2008 the Luff Award for outstanding service to the society.

== Philatelic activity ==
Peter McCann served the APS in a variety of ways, including acting as president, vice president, chairman, board member, and ambassador-at-large for the society. He served on, and chaired, various committees, and he also served as judge on at least 125 national stamp exhibitions.

In addition to judging exhibits of others at stamp exhibitions, McCann has exhibited, nationally and internationally, selections from his own collections and has won national grand awards with three different exhibits.

McCann has served as president of the American Philatelic Congress, the American Association of Philatelic Exhibitors, and the British Caribbean Philatelic Study Group. He is a Fellow of the Royal Philatelic Society London, and has been a trustee of the Philatelic Foundation. He served as co-chairman of the Council of Philatelists at the National Postal Museum at the Smithsonian Institution in Washington, D.C. He was elected Vice President of FIP, the Fédération Internationale de Philatélie, in 2004 and reelected in 2008.

== Philatelic literature ==
McCann has written articles on various aspects of philately and has served as co-editor and co-author of several books related to philately of Caribbean islands and the islands of the South Atlantic Ocean.

== Honors and awards ==
In addition to receiving the Luff Award in 2008, McCann signed the Roll of Distinguished Philatelists in 2007. He has also been awarded the Eugene Klein Memorial Award, the Phoenix Award, and the Skavaril Award. In 2010 he was awarded the Alfred F. Lichtenstein Memorial Award.

== See also ==
- Philatelic literature
