= Crawford Library =

Philatelic library

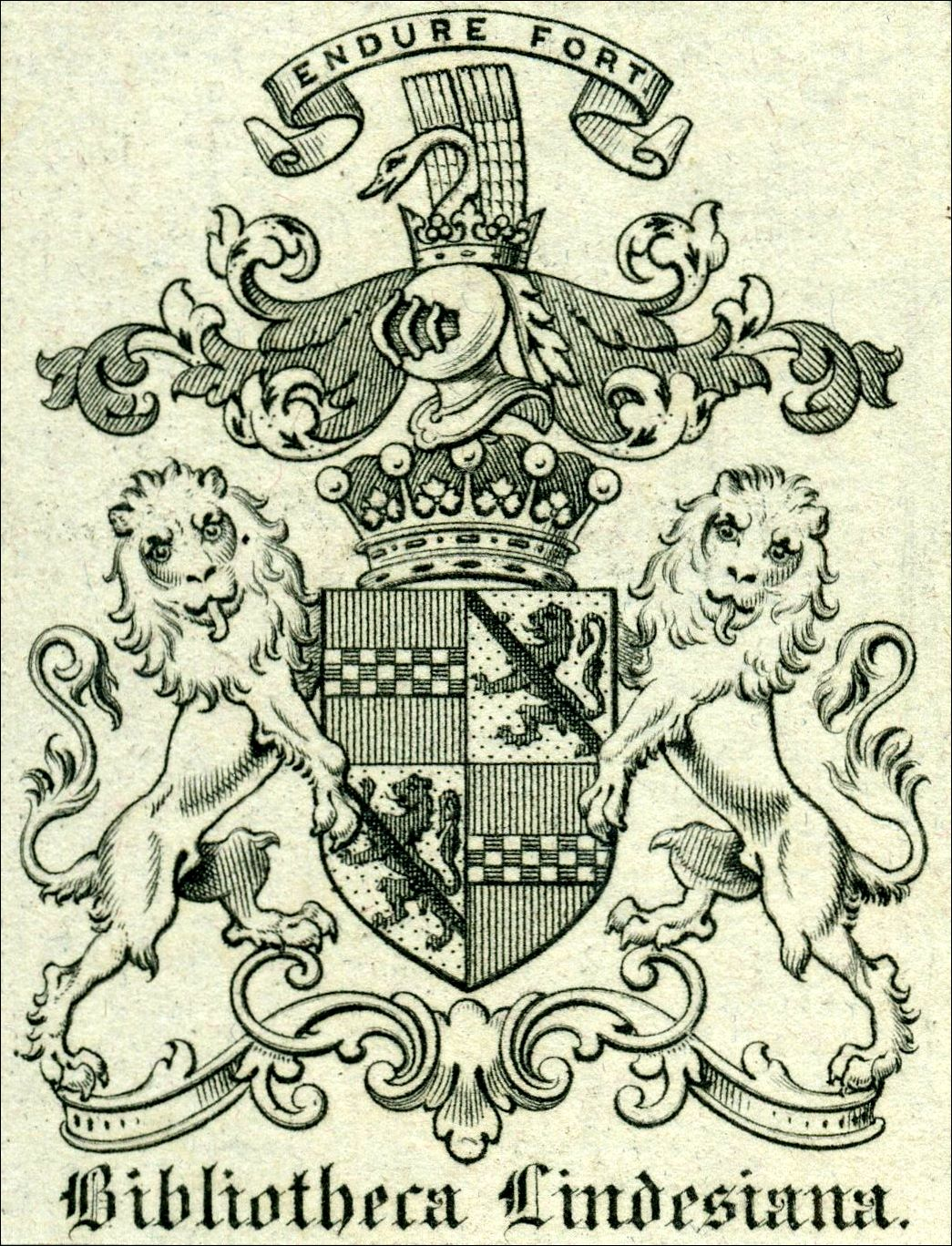
A book plate from the Bibliotheca Lindesiana.

The Crawford Library is a library of early books about philately formed between 1898 and 1913 by James Lindsay, 26th Earl of Crawford. By the time of his death in 1913, Crawford was thought to have amassed the greatest philatelic library of his time. Today, the library is part of the British Library Philatelic Collections.

== Formation and bequest ==
Crawford was a noted bibliophile long before he became interested in philately. The family library, the "Bibliotheca Lindesiana" located at Haigh Hall in Haigh near Wigan, had its origins in the sixteenth century and became world-famous among scholars for its scope and the many bibliographies of its stock which exceeded 100,000 volumes.

=== The Tiffany Library ===
Not long after 1897, Crawford purchased the library of philatelic literature formed by John K. Tiffany of St. Louis, Missouri, the first president of the American Philatelic Society, and which was thought to be the most complete formed up to that time. Tiffany's library was particularly strong on United States philatelic journals and he was calculated to have 97% of everything published on American philately by the time of his death, including dealer's price lists, society records and even stamp related music. Much of Tiffany's library was included in the work which he produced for the Boston Public Library in 1874 entitled The Philatelical Library. (Free download of The Philatelical Library here.)

The Tiffany Library was acquired for Crawford by Charles J. Phillips, then managing director of Stanley Gibbons, who viewed it while travelling in America. He informed Crawford that the condition of the library was not good and the price of $10,000 (about £2,000 at the time) was too high but Crawford told him to buy it at that price anyway. The library consisted of 909 bound volumes and 136 unbound as well as an extensive card index to its contents which was valuable in itself. It was delivered to Crawford in 39 boxes at his London home of 2 Cavendish Square on 28 June 1901. Phillips charged a 5% commission for the negotiations.

After the purchase of the Tiffany Library, Crawford employed Edward Denny Bacon as curator of the collection. Bacon worked from Cavendish Square, sorting and cataloguing the works and he was assiduous in tracking down missing philatelic periodicals with the help of Stanley Gibbons.

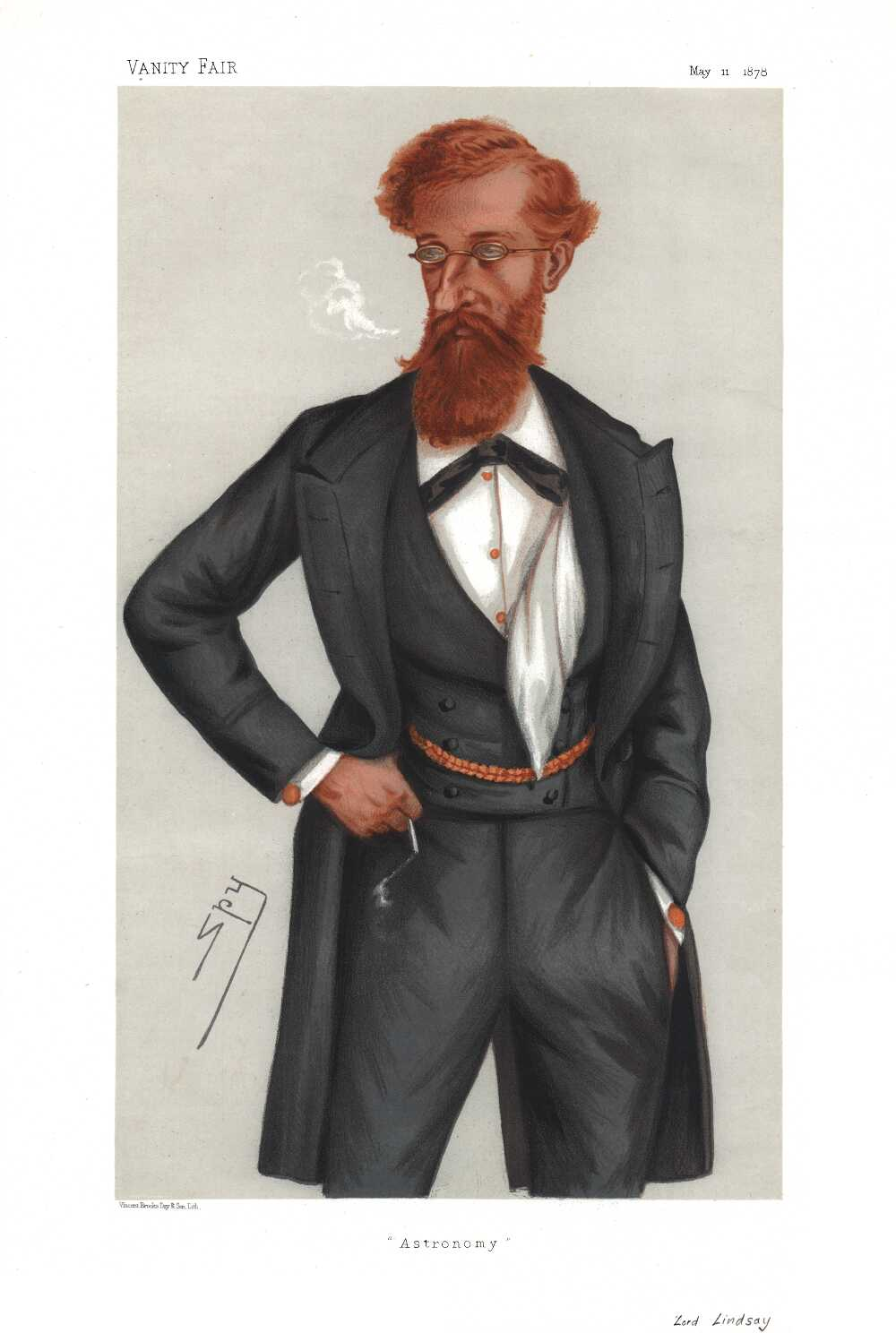
A caricature of Crawford by Leslie Ward.

=== The Fraenkel Library ===
A further addition was the library of the late Judge Heinrich Fraenkel of Berlin, a former librarian of the Berliner Philatelisten-Klub, which included strong holdings of German literature and also incorporated the library of Sigmund Friedl of Vienna. This library totalled 39 cases of books with surplus material being donated to the Royal Philatelic Society for their library.

=== Donation ===
Crawford was a trustee of the British Museum and following his death on 31 January 1913, the library was donated to the British Museum by a codicil to his Will. The library was received on 17 March 1913. In 1973 it passed to the British Library following a reorganisation.

== Catalogues ==
In 1911, a catalogue of the library by Edward Denny Bacon was published by the Aberdeen University Press under the title Bibliotheca Lindesiana, Vol VII: A Bibliography of the Writings General, Special and Periodical Forming the Literature of Philately and in 1911 the rights to the work were assigned to the Philatelic Literature Society (PLS). The Society republished the work as The Catalogue of the Philatelic Library of the Earl of Crawford, K.T., a work which won a Large Gold medal at the Postwertzeichen Ausstellung stamp exhibition in Vienna in 1911. A supplement to the catalogue was published in 1926 by the PLS and an addenda in the March 1938 edition of The London Philatelist, both by E.D. Bacon.

In 1991, a new edition of the catalogue was published by the British Library with shelf marks and marginalia by E.D. Bacon included and a preface by David Beech.

Not all the works mentioned in these books are included in the library, as the original book was a bibliography of all known philatelic works, and not a catalogue of Crawford's library.

== Preservation ==
In 1985 a major project started to microfilm the library as many of the works were found to have deteriorated with age. This has now been completed.

In addition, by February 2011, about 80% of the library had been rebound, with and without conservation work such as deacidification and lamination.

== Viewing the library ==
The works may be viewed in the British Library's Rare Books & Music Reading Room.

== Contents ==
The library includes approximately 4500 volumes and is notable for containing:

- Early postal notices of China.
- Frederick Booty's Aids to Stamp Collectors, 1862. The first postage stamp catalogue in English.
- The notebooks of Judge F.A. Philbrick, one of the first philatelists.
- Literature and ephemera from the early Philatelic Congresses of Great Britain.
- Mount Brown's Catalogue of British, Colonial, and Foreign Postage Stamps, 1862. The second stamp catalogue in English.
- The earliest known Stanley Gibbons stamp catalogue.
- Dr J.E. Gray's A Hand Catalogue of Postage Stamps for the use of the Collector, 1862. One of the first stamp catalogues. Free download here.
- The first fifteen editions of the catalogue by J.W. Scott & Co.
- A.C. Kline's Stamp Collectors' Manual. First edition.
- Material from Oscar Berger-Levrault, Jean-Baptiste Moens and Pierre Mahé & Son.
- A drawing by Adolph Reinheimer depicting the first recorded public display of postage stamps at the Vandermaelen Museum in Brussels (1852).

== See also ==
- The Crawford Medal. A medal awarded by the Royal Philatelic Society London for philatelic literature.
- List of philatelic libraries
- Philatelic literature
- The Crawford Collection at the Royal Observatory, Edinburgh.
