= Clyde Jennings =

American philatelist

- Born: March 28, 1916
- Died: May 17, 2006 (aged 90)
- Engineering career
- Institutions: Society of Philatelic Americans; American Academy of Philately; Florida Federation of Stamp Clubs
- Projects: Accumulated award winning U.S. stamp collection; noted, speaker, philatelic judge
- Awards: Luff Award; APS Hall of Fame

Clyde Jennings (March 28, 1916 – May 17, 2006), of Florida, was a prominent figure in philately with his colorful speeches, writings, and personality, as well as his leadership.

== Collecting interests ==
Jennings specialized in the collecting of United States stamps and postal history, especially cancellations of stamps on cover. His collection was so significant that it won numerous gold awards at national and international philatelic shows.

== Philatelic activity ==
Jennings helped to provide leadership for the hobby. He served as president of the Society of Philatelic Americans, a director of the American Academy of Philately, president of the Florida Federation of Stamp Clubs, and was a founding member of the American Association of Philatelic Exhibitors. He encouraged stamp collecting by juniors, and served as mentor to collectors both young and old. His knowledge of philately was extensive, and he was assigned by the American Philatelic Society to serve on juries of their stamp shows.

Because of his enthusiasm and strong ties to Florida, Jennings was a major force on the Florida Philatelic Exhibition (FLOREX) show committee of the Florida Federation of Stamp Clubs.

== Honors and awards ==
Clyde Jennings received the Southeast Pennsylvania and Delaware (SEPAD) National Merit Award in 1989 and the John N. Luff Award for Exceptional Contributions to Philately in 1988. He was named to the American Philatelic Society Hall of Fame in 2007.

== See also ==
- Philately
- Philatelic literature
