= Starnes =

Starnes is a surname. Notable people with the surname include:

- Charles J. Starnes (1912–1993), of Michigan
- Colin Starnes, professor and author
- Cortlandt Starnes (1864–1934)
- Donna Feore (born 1963), Canadian choreographer and theatre director born Donna Starnes
- Edgar V. Starnes, Republican member of the North Carolina General Assembly
- Henry Starnes (1816–1896), Quebec businessman
- Joe Starnes (1895–1962), congressional representative from Alabama
- Kalib Starnes (born 1975)
- Paul M. Starnes (1934–2015), American politician
- Todd Starnes, American conservative writer and commentator
