= Herman Herst Jr. =

American philatelist

Herman "Pat" Herst Jr. (March 17, 1909 – January 31, 1999) was a writer of philatelic literature, in many cases on the history of the hobby, as well as a stamp dealer and stamp auctioneer. He began his career on Nassau Street in New York City in 1933, moving to Shrub Oak, New York in 1946, remaining there until he finally retired to Florida in 1973.

In Florida he remained involved in philately, giving speeches and talks at the Hollywood Stamp Club (Hollywood, Florida) and other institutions. When he died, his extensive library was donated to Florida Atlantic University, at Boca Raton, Florida.

He was active in the ACLU, The Baker Street Irregulars and other non-philatelic groups.

== Life ==
Herst was born on March 17, 1909, the son of a New York lawyer. When his father died in 1913, he added the "Jr." His friends, noting his birthday fell on St Patrick's Day, called him "Pat" - ironic because Herst was Jewish.

His mother, Lillian Myers Herst, was a violinist who conducted music lessons for summer camps. She also performed in John Philips Sousa's all-female orchestra. Herst was sent to his aunt's home in Portland, Oregon when he was 12.

At Reed College, he studied International law.

While working for a brokerage firm, he made a delivery to a stamp dealer on Nassau Street, the hub for New York stamp dealers. This meeting started Herst on his course to becoming a stamp dealer himself.

== Philatelic accomplishments ==
Herst was primarily known for his writing, which included numerous books and articles:

- Nassau Street: a Quarter Century of Stamp Dealing (1960), republished by Amos Media as Nassau Street in 1988
- Fun and Profit in Stamp Collecting (1962)
- Stories to Collect Stamps by (1968)
- The Complete Philatelist (1979)
- More Stories to Collect Stamps By (1982)
- Forensic Philately: an Account of the Famous English Stamp Fraud Trials... (1986)
- Herst's Outbursts, a newsletter issued from the 1940s to 1973
- wrote articles in most U.S. philatelic publications
- set up a local post in Shrub Oak, NY, which issued and postmarked its own stamps

He received several notable awards, including the American Philatelic Society's Luff Award in 1961, and was elected as the only American on the board of the Philatelic Traders Society in the UK. In 2000, he was posthumously inducted in the American Philatelic Society Hall of Fame.

== Philatelic leadership ==
Herst's literary work in the field of philately helped introduce newcomers to the hobby; at the same time, his literature delved into the history of philately, which proved interesting to both the newcomer and the advanced collector of stamps.

He participated in philatelic events, such as auctions, issued his own local stamps showing his German Shepherd Alfie (based on an obscure 1862 law), and gave speeches on philatelic subjects.

== Family ==
He was married to Ingeborg Ursula Adam, who died in 1954, and later to Ida Busch. He was survived by his second wife Ida, and two children: Kenneth of Springfield, Virginia, and Patricia Held of Centreville, Virginia. He had two stepchildren: Gary K. Busch of London and Gail C. Busch of Manhattan. He left behind six grandchildren and four great-grandchildren.

== Selected publications ==
- Fancy Cancellations on Nineteenth Century United States Postage Stamps. Self-published. 1963. p. 288.
- Forensic Philately (An Account of the Famous English Stamp Fraud Trials involving Messrs. Bluett, Benjamin, Sarpy, Jeffryes and Dr. Assmus Originally Published in "The Stamp News", 1890-1892). Lake Oswego, Oregon: Herman Herst Jr., 1986. (ed.)
- Nassau Street. Linns Stamp News. 1988. p. 310. ISBN 0940403064.
- Fun and Profit in Stamp Collecting. Linns Stamp News. 1988. p. 180. ISBN 0940403056.

== See also ==
- Philately
- Philatelic literature
- Nassau Street (Manhattan)
