= John Hotchner =

American philatelist

John McClure Hotchner is an American philatelist and philatelic writer. In 2013, he received the Charles J. Peterson Philatelic Literature Life Achievement award from the American Philatelic Society. He was a member of the National Postal Museum Council of Philatelists of the Smithsonian National Postal Museum. In 2017 he was appointed to the Roll of Distinguished Philatelists.

He was employed with the United States Department of State for 42 years and the Human Smuggling and Trafficking Center.

== Selected publications ==
- Facts and Fantasy About Philately. 21st Century Stamp Company, 1992. (Anthology)
