= John Kerr Tiffany =

American philatelist (1842–1897)

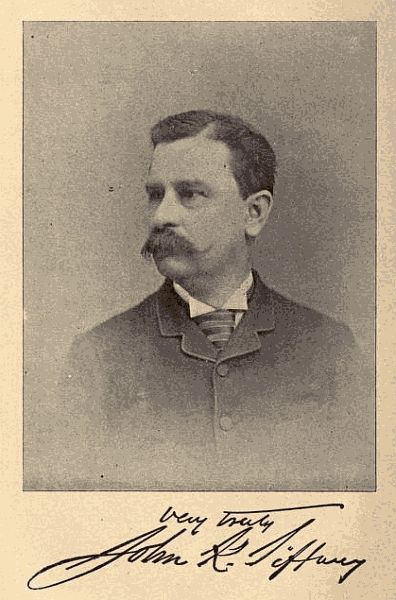
- John Kerr Tiffany
- Born: February 9, 1843
- Died: March 3, 1897 (aged 54)
- Engineering career
- Institutions: American Philatelic Association
- Projects: Created the largest philatelic library of his era; successfully plated the St. Louis Postmaster Provisionals
- Awards: APS Hall of Fame

John Kerr Tiffany (February 9, 1843 – March 3, 1897), of St. Louis, Missouri, was one of the earliest American philatelists and was regarded in an 1890 poll of philatelists as the second most important person in philately, second only to the famous John Walter Scott.

== Philatelic literature ==
As a student in France Tiffany started collecting postage stamps and decided to collect “every printed matter connected to the hobby of philately.” With that in mind, he established perhaps the greatest library of philatelic literature of the era. On the basis of his library holdings and other material not in his possession, he wrote and published in 1874 The Philatelical Library: A Catalogue of Stamp Publications. He continued his work in identifying and cataloging philatelic literature and, in 1889, he published The Stamp Collector's Library Companion(Part 1) and an addenda in 1890. When Tiffany died in 1897, his philatelic library was the largest in the world, and it was purchased intact by James L. Lindsay, the Earl of Crawford. Lindsay, in turn, when he died, left the library to the British Museum.

Among his stamp collections, Tiffany had arranged specialized collections of the United States and British North America. Since he lived in the St. Louis, Missouri, area, he studied the St. Louis Postmaster Provisionals (listed in Scott catalog as 11X1 to 11X8 and commonly referred to as “the bears”) and was able to correctly plate them. With the limited quantity he had to deal with, this was very difficult, but his plating was proved correct when adequate quantities were later found. Based on his findings, he wrote and published a monograph entitled A St. Louis Symposium in 1894.

Tiffany published the first comprehensive listing of United States postage stamps, entitled Les Timbres des Etats-Unis d'Amerique. It was printed in three parts in 1883, and he later expanded it in 1887 as History of the Postage Stamps of the United States of America.

== Philatelic activity ==
The American Philatelic Association (now the American Philatelic Society) was organized in 1886, and Tiffany was elected president and re-elected as president for ten more years at which time he decided to no longer run for the office.

== Library ==
Tiffany's philatelic library was incorporated into the Crawford Library which now forms part of the British Library Philatelic Collections.

== Honors and awards ==
Tiffany was named to the American Philatelic Society Hall of Fame in 1941.

== See also ==
- Philately
- Philatelic literature

== References and sources ==
Sources

- John Kerr Tiffany at the American Philatelic Society Hall of Fame.
