= International Philatelic Libraries Association =

Organization

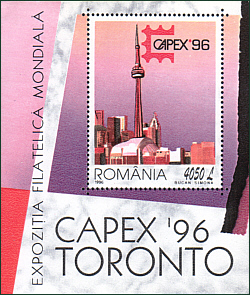
A Romanian stamp for the Capex 96 stamp exhibition in Toronto where the IPLA was formed.

The International Philatelic Libraries Association (IPLA) was formed in 1996 at the Capex 96 stamp exhibition in Toronto.

Delegates from many countries attended including Virginia Horn from the American Philatelic Research Library and David Beech, Curator of the British Library Philatelic Collection. The library of the Royal Philatelic Society London is also a member.

== See also ==
- List of philatelic libraries
- Philatelic literature
