= Western Philatelic Library =

- 37.4878°N 122.2361°W
- Location: 3004 Spring Street; Redwood City, California 94063, United States
- Type: Research Library
- Established: 1969; 57 years ago

Other information
- Website: www.fwpl.org

The Western Philatelic Library is a privately funded philatelic library located in Redwood City, California. The 3000-square-foot library is open to public and has about 200 members. The library is administered by the Friends of Western Philatelic Library, Inc. and staffed by volunteers.

== History ==
The library was originally founded as South Bay Philatelic Library in 1969 by Roger Skinner and other philatelists with space provided by the Sunnyvale Public Library in Sunnyvale, California. The library's core collection came from the Pacific Philatelic Society.

In 2014, the library relocated from Sunnyvale to 3004 Spring Street in Redwood City, California.

== Legal status ==
The library is registered with the United States Internal Revenue Service as a 501(c)(3) non-profit corporation and donations are treated as a charitable deduction for the purposes of United States Federal Income Tax.

== Mission statement ==
"The Western Philatelic Library exists to enhance the preservation and dissemination of philatelic knowledge by acquiring, organizing, interpreting and distributing information resources in a globally networked community.

Our Commitments:

- to build and conserve a world class collection of printed, electronic and other media;
- to support, extend and enrich the pursuit of knowledge and enjoyment through stamp collecting;
- to provide access and support for beginners, hobbyists, specialists, writers, and postal historians;
- to promote knowledge through public educational events and displays; and
- to collaborate and cooperate with other libraries and philatelic groups throughout the world."

== Collections ==
The library collection includes 14,000 books and pamphlets, 5000 bound volumes of journals, 6000 general and specialty catalogues.

As well as a general collection of philatelic literature, the library also contain several important historic collections, including part of the Hiram Edmund Deats library. Deats was born in New Jersey in 1870 and was a founding member of the American Philatelic Association which eventually became the American Philatelic Society. Deats was also the founding Librarian of the Collectors Club of New York.

Other special collections include the Tonga/Tin Can Mail Study Circle Library, the Society of Australasian Specialists/Oceania William H. Buckley Library and the Tannu Tuva Collectors Society Library.

== Journal ==
The library publishes a newsletter The Bay Phil three times a year in April, August and December, which includes book reviews, philatelic articles and announcements. Current editor is Bob Gordon.
