= Roger Brody =

American philatelist

- Born: 1938 (age 87–88)
- Occupation: Philatelist
- Known for: Signatory of the Roll of Distinguished Philatelists; Specialist in early 20th-century United States philately; Recovery of missing Inverted Jenny stamp
- Awards: Alfred F. Lichtenstein Memorial Award; John H. Luff Award for Distinguished Philatelic Research

Roger Brody (born 1938) is an American philatelist who in 2016 was invited to sign the Roll of Distinguished Philatelists. He is chairman of the Research Committee of the Smithsonian Museum's Council of Philatelists and is a specialist in early twentieth-century United States philately. Brody has received the Alfred F. Lichtenstein Memorial Award from the Collectors Club of New York, and the John H. Luff Award for Distinguished Philatelic Research from the American Philatelic Society.

In 2016, he also appeared at the World Stamp Show in New York City at a press conference where it was announced that a missing inverted Jenny stamp was recovered. The stamp was owned by the American Philatelic Research Library, which he led as president at the time.

Brody served as president of the American Philatelic Research Library until 2017.

In 2005, he gave the fourth annual Maynard Sundman Lecture at the Smithsonian National Postal Museum.
