= James DeVoss =

American philatelist

James Thomas DeVoss (March 22, 1916 – April 8, 2008) was an American philatelist who was added to the Roll of Distinguished Philatelists in 1981.

DeVoss was an expert in the detection of fakes and counterfeits in philately and the director of the American Philatelic Society's expertizing service. He was one of the co-authors of The Yucatan affair: the work of Raoul Ch. de Thuin, philatelic counterfeiter, which described the forgery career of Raoul de Thuin.
