= John N. Luff =

American philatelist (1860–1938)

John Nicholas Luff
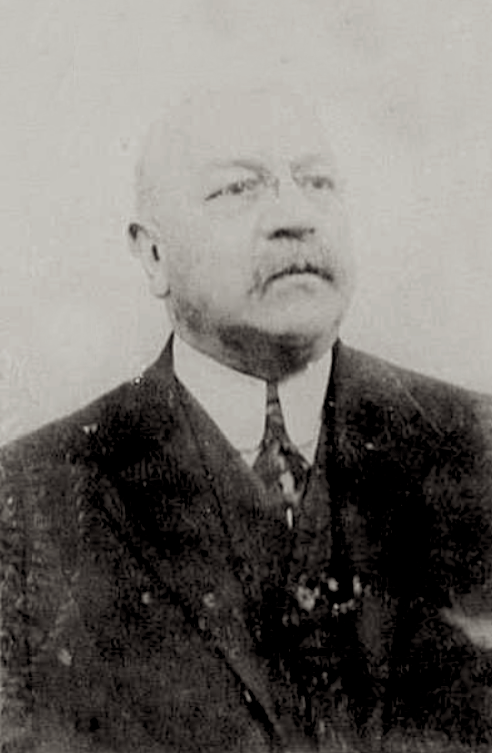
- John N. Luff in 1923
- Born: November 16, 1860
- Died: August 23, 1938 (aged 77)
- Engineering career
- Institutions: Collectors Club of New York; American Philatelic Society
- Projects: Used scientific methods in the study of postage stamps
- Awards: APS Hall of Fame

John Nicholas Luff (November 16, 1860 – August 23, 1938) of New York City was one of the important philatelists of the late 19th and early 20th centuries, notable as an early user of scientific methods in the study of postage stamps. The Luff Award of the American Philatelic Society is named after him.

== Philatelic career ==
He developed a serious interest in philately in 1890, and joined the Pacific Philatelic Society in San Francisco, California. He moved to New York City in 1893 with the intention of becoming a full-time stamp dealer, and the following year joined the Scott Stamp & Coin Company, at the time one of the largest dealers in the world. At Scott he headed the approval department, edited the American Journal of Philately, and co-edited the Scott catalog.

In 1896, he helped establish the Collectors Club of New York, and was later its president for a number of years.

He became president of Scott in 1903, but moved to Stanley Gibbons in 1905, shortly after returning to Scott, where he remained for the rest of his life.

Luff had become perhaps the most prolific philatelic writer of the age, with works ranging from the tutorial What Philately Teaches Us (1899) to the classic reference work The Postage Stamps of the United States (1902), and numerous articles in the AJP and Mekeel's Weekly Stamp News.

In addition to building a US collection that won the gold medal at the Paris exhibition of 1900, Luff also collected Great Britain, Shanghai, Hawaii, Japan, and China. But his most important collection was a reference collection that he used as a basis for comparison when expertizing stamps at Scott. He sold the collection to Scott when he left in 1905; the collection was later donated to the Philatelic Foundation, where it mostly still resides and is in use as of 2003.

Luff was president of the American Philatelic Society from 1907 to 1909. In 1913, Luff was one of 10 judges who participated in the Panama-Pacific Exposition held in San Francisco, CA. There were 6 other U.S. judges at the Expo. In 1941, he was named to the American Philatelic Society Hall of Fame.

== The Luff reference collection ==
Luff's remarkable collection of postage stamps of the world is described in detail in the Orange volume of The Stamp Specialist.

== Books ==
- Philately Teaches Us (1899) Pub. Scott Stamp Co.
- The Postage Stamps of the United States (1902) Pub. Scott Stamp & Coin Co.
- A Reference List of the Stamps of Panama (1905)
