= The Stamp Collector's Record =

The Stamp Collector's Record was the first magazine of stamp collecting published on the North American continent. The first edition was issued from Montreal, Canada, by Samuel Allan Taylor, in February 1864. A second edition was said to have been produced but only a few copies distributed. From December 1864 it was published from Albany, New York, until it ceased in October 1876 with volume 4, number 6.
