= Carl Einar Pelander =

American stamp dealer and auctioneer

- Born: October 18, 1893
- Died: February 16, 1966 (aged 72)
- Occupations: Stamp dealer and auctioneer
- Known for: Expert on postage stamps and postal history of the Scandinavian countries Fieandt Memorial medal APS Hall of Fame; Finnish-American Stamp Club

Carl Einar Pelander (October 18, 1893 – February 16, 1966) was a stamp dealer and auctioneer who was an expert on postage stamps and postal history of the Scandinavian countries of Denmark, Greenland, Iceland, Danish West Indies, Finland, Norway, and Sweden.

== Collecting interests ==
Pelander started collecting stamps as a youth, and quickly specialized in collecting those of the Scandinavian countries.

Pelander was one of the founders of New York City's Finnish-American Stamp Club in 1935 and was the first member to be named an Honorary Life Member. The club was later renamed the Scandinavian Collectors Club of New York, and then again later as Scandinavian Collectors Club. Pelander was very active in the organization, helping to finance it during poor economic times, and editing the club journal The Posthorn.

== Sales activity ==
Carl Pelander started his New York City stamp business in 1937 and, between 1940 and 1963, he conducted 130 auctions of stamps. His auctions contained material from stamp collections of famous collectors, such as Agathon Fabergé, Caroline P. Cromwell, and Ferrars H. Tows.

== Philatelic literature ==
Because of his in-depth knowledge of the philately of Scandinavia, and especially Finland, Pelander wrote a number of articles, some of which were compiled into his book The Postal Issues of Finland which was published in 1940. He also published a Scandinavian Check List from 1937 to 1948.

== Honors and awards ==
Pelander was presented with the Fieandt Memorial medal in 1960 by the Finnish Philatelic Society "for his original research in the stamps of Finland and for his promotion of Finnish philately." Pelander was named to the American Philatelic Society Hall of Fame in 1966.

== Carl E. Pelander Award ==
The Carl E. Pelander Award was established in 1968 by the Scandinavian Collectors Club in his memory "to recognize his willingness to assist fellow collectors in all phases of Scandinavian philately."

== See also ==
- Philately
- Philatelic literature
