= Creighton C. Hart =

American philatelist

- Born: February 22, 1906
- Died: March 1, 1993 (aged 87)
- Engineering career
- Projects: Editor and author of articles on classic United States postage and postal history
- Awards: APS Hall of Fame; Luff Award

Creighton C. Hart (February 22, 1906 – March 1, 1993), of Missouri, was a stamp collector and a writer of philatelic articles on specific niches of United States postage stamp collecting.

== Collecting interests ==
Unlike some stamp collectors who collect stamps of many countries, Hart restricted his collecting to narrow views of American philately. He was a specialist in the postage stamps of the United States 1847 issue and postal history related to that issue. He also specialized in collecting covers containing the free franks of American presidents and their widows. Hart's specialized collections were displayed at various philatelic shows and won many awards.

== Philatelic literature ==
Along with Susan Marshall McDonald, Hart co-authored the “Directory of 10¢ 1847 Covers” which was published in 1970, and expanded by Hart afterwards.

For many years, Hart was an editor at The Chronicle of U.S. Classic Postal Issues, where he was responsible for editing the 1847-1851 section.

== Honors and awards ==
Hart received the Luff Award for Distinguished Philatelic Research in 1970, and was named to the American Philatelic Society Hall of Fame in 1994.

== See also ==
- Philately
- Philatelic literature
