= Stanley J. Luft =

- Engineering career
- Institutions: Acadéemie Européene de Philatélie; Académie de Philatélie; Royal Philatelic Society London
- Projects: Student of French philately; wrote and exhibited extensively on the subject, winning numerous gold medals
- Awards: Luff Award; Gerard Gilbert Memorial award

Stanley J. Luft of Golden, Colorado, is a philatelist who is an expert on the postal history of France.

== Collecting interests ==
Luft specialized in the collecting of rare postage stamps and postal history of France. His collections of French postal history centered on specific aspects of French philately, such as postal history of the Grande Armée, the French Revolution, various French military campaigns, the 15-centimes Sage issue and the 30-centimes Cameo Sowers. When placed in competition at national and international exhibitions, they often won gold. Luft is the recipient of at least thirty gold medals, reserve awards, grand awards and, among others, the Prix d’Honneur (London 1990).

== Philatelic literature ==
Based on his research of all aspects of French philately, Luft wrote numerous articles in publications such as the France & Colonies Philatelist, The American Philatelist, Postal History Journal, Collectors Club Philatelist, American Philatelic Congress Book, Military Postal History Society Bulletin, London Philatelist and Feuilles Marcophiles.

He also wrote three volumes on French philately.

== Philatelic activity ==
In addition to serving on the council of the American Philatelic Congress, Luft was a founding member of the Académie Européene de Philatélie and a corresponding member of the Académie de philatélie and was editor of France & Colonies Philatelist. He was named a Fellow of the Royal Philatelic Society London. He was president of the Collectors Club of Denver and the Philatelic Society of Cincinnati, as well as serving the Rocky Mountain Stamp Show in various posts, including president.

== Honors and awards ==
In addition to all his gold medals, Luft received numerous honors. He won, three times, the France & Colonies Philatelic Society Gerard Gilbert Memorial award for philatelic literature. In 2008, he was awarded the Luff Award for Distinguished Philatelic Research.

== Bibliography ==
- 1979, The Regular Issues of France According to Their Normal Postal Usage. France and Colonies Philatelic Society
- 1984, Waugh, Wiliam M., Stanley J. Luft and Robert G. Stone (ed.):A Chronology of French Military Campaigns and Expeditions with Their Postal Markings 1815–1983
- 1993, Military and Postal History of the Revolutionary Armies in the West of France 1791–1802, ENVISION Monographs

== See also ==
- Philately
- Philatelic literature
