= Susan Marshall McDonald =

American philatelist (1918–1992)

- Born: October 7, 1918; Cleveland, Ohio
- Died: March 17, 1992 (aged 73); Cleveland, Ohio
- Engineering career
- Projects: Authored numerous articles on philatelic subjects; helped edit philatelic literature of others
- Awards: Lichtenstein Medal; APS Hall of Fame; Luff Award

Susan Marshall McDonald (October 7, 1918 – March 17, 1992), of Ohio, was a philatelist who authored articles on philatelic subjects, and helped other philatelists edit their work.

== Collecting interests ==
She had a wide range of collecting interests, but was most known for her collections of United States/Canada cross-border and Treaty mails, which she exhibited at national and international stamp shows.

== Philatelic literature ==
In addition to writing articles on her studies McDonald edited various philatelic publications, such as The Chronicle of U.S. Classic Postal Issues, where she remained editor and then editor-in-chief for two decades. She co-authored, with Creighton C. Hart the “Directory of 10¢ 1847 Covers” published in 1970. In addition to her own editing, she helped edit books and articles of other philatelic writers.

== Honors and awards ==
McDonald received numerous awards including the U.S. Philatelic Classics Society's Ashbrook Cup in 1971, the Luff Award for Exceptional Contributions to Philately in 1986, the Brookman cup in 1990, and the Lichtenstein Medal in 1989. She was named to the American Philatelic Society Hall of Fame in 1993.

== See also ==
- Philately
- Philatelic literature
