= Baltimore Philatelic Society =

Stamp collecting group in Baltimore

- Founded: 1889
- Type: not-for-profit organization
- Purpose: Worldwide philately
- Location: Baltimore, Maryland
- Method: Lectures, exhibits, philatelic literature
- Revenue: membership
- Website: www.balpex.org, email balpex@verizon.net
- Hosts "BALPEX" philatelic exhibition annually

The Baltimore Philatelic Society (B.P.S.) is one of the oldest philatelic societies in the United States, established in Baltimore, Maryland, in 1889. A history of the Baltimore Society was written by Herbert A. Trenchard.

== Current location ==
The society was located for over sixty years in its own building, a historic luxurious 1870s era townhouse at 1224 North Calvert Street in Baltimore, Maryland, which was purchased in 1961, which was later named "The Horace W. Harrison Philatelic Center". After many decades in the Mount Vernon-Belvedere neighborhood, north of downtown, in July 2012, the Philatelic Society was relocated to suburban Howard County, Maryland near the historic county seat of Ellicott City, to 3440 Ellicott Center Drive, .

Membership is open to all persons interested in stamp collecting, world and American postal history, and the local aspects of same. The organization actively encourages young people to take up the hobby.

== Publications ==
The Society's official journal is the "Baltimore Philatelist" which was first published in 1936. The "B.P." journal contains current news of the Society, a calendar of philatelic events, and articles related to postage stamps and postal history, especially with any connections to the city and state which may be submitted by members and non-members.

== BALPEX ==
The Society holds an annual stamp exhibition.The event is called "BALPEX" ("Baltimore Philatelic Exhibition") which began in the 1930s and usually held in a historic downtown hotel such as the Hotel Belvedere on East Chase Street off North Charles Street, the Lord Baltimore Hotel on West Baltimore and North Hanover Streets, or the old Southern Hotel at Light Street and Redwood Streets. Recently for the last few decades it has been held at the Hunt Valley Inn, in Hunt Valley, off the Baltimore-Harrisburg Expressway (Interstate 83) several miles north of the City in suburban Baltimore County, north of the county seat of Towson, near Cockeysville-Timonium

== Philatelic library ==
The Baltimore Philatelic Society houses a philatelic library whose books included many donated by local leading philatelists and associated friends, including H. L. Lindquist, Solomon Glass and George Townsend Turner. The B.P.S. Library also houses the libraries of the associated Germany Philatelic Society and the Society for Czechoslovak Philately.

== See also ==
- Philately
