= Northwest Philatelic Library =

Coordinates: 45.5581°N 122.6303°W

The library logo.

The Northwest Philatelic Library is based in Portland, Oregon.

== History ==
The library was originally established as the Harold Peterson Philatelic Library, part of the Oregon Stamp Society. In 2003 it became a separate legal entity in its own right as the Northwest Philatelic Library, Inc.

== Governance ==
The library is governed and managed by a volunteer executive board of three officers and four directors-at-large.

== The collection ==
The collection comprises over 3000 books and around 200 philatelic journals.

== Journal ==
The library publishes a journal, Book Reports.
