= George E. Hargest =

- Born: August 26, 1906
- Died: February 5, 1983 (aged 76)
- Known for: Expert on United States transatlantic mail
- Spouse: Lois
- Children: Jay
- Awards: Crawford Medal; APS Hall of Fame; Luff Award

George E. Hargest (August 26, 1906 – February 5, 1983) of Florida, was a philatelist who specialized in the study of the overseas use of United States mails.

== Personal life ==
Hargest was born in Brooklyn, NY to Archibald T. and Jessie E. Hargest. He started collecting stamps when he was twelve years old. His interest waned when he was in college and graduate school so he sold his collection to help defray the cost. He received his bachelor's degree from Temple University where he was a member of Sigma Pi fraternity. He started collecting again in 1939 but didn't become interested in transatlantic mail until 1955. He worked as an associate professor of Accounting at Clark University in Worcester, MA. Dr. Hargest was married to his wife, Lois, and had one son named Jay. In his later years he moved to Florida for health reasons.

== Collecting interests ==
Hargest collected and studied classic stamps of the United States as well as United States foreign mail.

== Philatelic literature ==
He was an expert on the subject and wrote The History of Letter Post Communications Between the United States and Europe, 1845-1875 which was published by the Smithsonian Institution in 1971 and 1975. Before the publication of this book there were no texts on the operation of all the mail systems set up by U.S.-foreign country postal conventions.

Hargest was named editor-in-chief of The Chronicle of U.S. Classic Postal Issues, a journal of the United States Philatelic Classics Society, in 1963 and held the position until 1966. He continued to contribute articles as the editor of the transatlantic mails section.

His research was aided by his close proximity to the libraries at Clark University, the American Antiquarian Society, and Worcester County Law. In 1965 he was granted a sabbatical which he spent at the Smithsonian Institution studying 237 pieces of transatlantic mail in their collection.

== Honors and awards ==
Hargest received numerous honors, including the Crawford Medal in 1972 and the Luff Award in 1980 for Distinguished Philatelic Research. He was named to the American Philatelic Society Hall of Fame in 1984.

== See also ==
- Philately
- Philatelic literature
