= Wineburgh Philatelic Research Library =

- Location: University of Texas at Dallas
- Type: Research library / Special collection
- Established: 1976

Collection
- Specialization: Philatelic literature and postal history

Other information
- Parent organization: Eugene McDermott Library, University of Texas at Dallas

The Wineburgh Philatelic Research Library is part of the Eugene McDermott Library at the University of Texas at Dallas.

== History ==
The library was founded in 1976 by the late Harold Wineburgh and has its own endowment fund that supports its activities.

== The collection ==
Geographically the collection is strong in United States, British, Western European, and Mexican philatelic literature. It also has important collections of literature relating to forgeries, airmail, and state postal histories. Confederate postal history is also strong.

Special collections include the official archive of the Texas Philatelic Association, Inc. between 1896 and 2006.
