= Bernard Davis (British Empire Medal holder) =

Bernard Jeffrey Davis BEM (6 January 1933 – 13 February 2015) was awarded the British Empire Medal for risking his life rescuing a 3-year-old girl from a window ledge in a bomb damaged block of flats in 1949. At his death in 2015 he held the record for the youngest ever recipient of the award.

According to The Daily Telegraph, Davis aged 16 was already used to climbing bomb damaged and dangerous buildings in post World War II London. He was walking near Borough High Street in Southwark when he saw a group of people screaming at a toddler leaning out of an open 6th floor window 80 feet above street level. No one had gone into the building and the child was clearly in imminent danger so Davis ran up the stairs and attempted entry to the flat. When this proved impossible he made climbed onto the roof of the building before making a perilous 10 foot drop onto the back balcony. His story made headlines and the Bishop of Southwark presented his medal on 30 May 1949. He was also awarded the Carnegie Hero Fund Trust bronze medal though he was always extremely reticent about discussing his deed.
