= Scandinavia Philatelic Society =

- Founded: 1952
- Type: not-for-profit organization
- Purpose: stamps, postcards, postal history etc. of greater Scandinavia i.e. Denmark, Finland, Norway, Sweden, Iceland, Greenland, Faroe Islands, Danish West Indies, Åland and Spitsbergen.
- Location: England
- Origins: Scandinavian Collectors Club
- Region served: Worldwide
- Method: meetings, auctions, publications, packet service
- Key people: Michael Elliott, president
- Revenue: membership fees
- Website: Scandinavia Philatelic Society

The Scandinavia Philatelic Society was founded in the United Kingdom in 1952 as the Scandinavian Collectors Club, to promote the collection of Stamps, Postcards and Postal History of greater Scandinavia. That is Denmark, Finland, Norway, Sweden, Iceland, Greenland, Faroe Islands, Danish West Indies, Åland and Spitsbergen.

== Meetings ==
The Society holds regular meetings in the United Kingdom throughout the year and an AGM weekend, usually in the spring. These are informal events, visitors are welcome and dates are published on the website.

== Philatelic exhibitions ==
Members also exhibit at national exhibitions in Britain and international philatelic exhibitions around the world. The Society also attends exhibitions to promote Scandinavian philately, and new members are always welcome.

== Scandinavia contact ==
Scandinavia Philatelic Society publishes a magazine, Scandinavian Contact quarterly, with news, research and other articles for its members.

== Services ==
In addition, there are auctions of Scandinavian philatelic items. A packet service makes it possible for members to increase the size of their collections on an approval basis, paying for material bought and sending the rest on to the next member on the list. A number of such circuits exist, within the organization, catering for different interests and price brackets. Both stamps and Postal History are included.

The Society owns an extensive library from which members can borrow material for research purposes. A number of research publications relating to Scandinavian Mail have been published through the Society. Recent books include Spitzbergen Cruise Mail 1890 - 1914 and Finnish Fieldpost 1939 - 1945, both are available through the website.

== See also ==
- Scandinavian Collectors Club
- Stamp collecting
- Swedish Philatelic Federation
