= Charles J. Starnes =

Postal historian and writer

- Born: April 26, 1912
- Died: November 25, 1993 (aged 81)
- Engineering career
- Projects: Writer of extensive articles on philatelic subjects
- Awards: Luff Award; APS Hall of Fame

Charles J. Starnes (April 26, 1912 – November 25, 1993) was a postal historian and writer of philatelic articles.

== Theft and recovery of philatelic collection ==
Starnes compiled a significant collection, comprising six volumes of covers, Officials, and foreign rates. His collection was stolen in a home robbery in 1983, when it was valued at $350,000. Starnes turned over black and white copies of the items to the FBI after the robbery.

In May 2005, Florida-based stamp collector Michael Perlman found 16 Starnes items for sale on eBay. Perlman worked with FBI agents to pose as interested buyers and enter the seller's Tampa home. They found about 70% of the stolen collection in her home. This included the entire Officials collection and a large portion of Foreign Destinations.

The Charles J. Starnes Collection was offered at public auction by Robert A. Siegel Auction Galleries, Inc. on October 25–26, 2007. The auction house maintains a visual record of unrecovered objects.

== Philatelic literature ==
In 1982, Starnes published United States Letter Rates to Foreign Destinations, 1847 to GPU-UPU, which he later revised and updated in 1989. He was one of the editors of the Chronicle of the U.S. Classic Postal Issues, and was responsible for the Foreign Mails Section.

== Honors and awards ==
Charles Starnes was named to the American Philatelic Society Hall of Fame in 1995. He received the Luff Award for Distinguished Philatelic Research in 1986.

== See also ==
- Philately
- Philatelic literature

== Sources ==
- Charles J. Starnes
