= Frederick Sellers =

American philatelist

Frederick Burton "Bud" Sellers (23 June 1918 Kankakee, Illinois – 16 June 2010) [better known as F. Burton Sellers] was an American philatelist who was added to the Roll of Distinguished Philatelists in 1986.

Sellers was added to the American Philatelic Society Hall of Fame in 2012.
