= National Philatelic Museum, Philadelphia =

Former museum in Philadelphia, PA, USA

National Philatelic Museum
- Founded: 1948
- Founder: Bernard Davis
- Dissolved: c1959
- Type: not-for-profit organization
- Purpose: worldwide stamp collecting
- Location: Philadelphia, Pennsylvania
- Region served: worldwide philatelic societies
- Method: exhibits, philatelic exhibitions, philatelic library, and courses in philately through its Philatelic Institute
- Key people: Bernard Davis
- Published 36 Bulletins

The National Philatelic Museum, in Philadelphia, Pennsylvania, was a short-lived, not-for-profit organization that was intended to create awareness of, and offer courses on, philately.

== History ==
This museum was the brainchild of Bernard Davis, a wealthy banker and avid stamp collector. The museum, which was located at Broad and Diamond Streets in Philadelphia, opened its doors on December 5, 1948.

The museum offered a variety of services, including presentation of exhibits in frames for public viewing and a philatelic library. The museum also hosted numerous philatelic exhibitions held by various philatelic societies. The National Philatelic Museum was unusual in that, in conjunction with nearby Temple University, it offered courses in philately through its Philatelic Institute.

The museum published a total of thirty-six bulletins that contained articles about various aspects of philately, including France, Airpost, Pan-American, Bavaria, Germany, New South Wales, Switzerland, Ben Franklin, and the American Philatelic Congress.

The museum remained in existence for roughly ten years. In 1960, most of its material and equipment were transferred to the new Spellman Museum of Stamps & Postal History.
