= Bernard Davis (philanthropist) =

American philanthropist

Bernard Davis (1892–1973) was a textile manufacturer, phi'latelist, painter, art collector, art patron and philanthropist. He was best known as the owner of the Miami Museum of Modern Art, entity which he presided over from 1962 until 1973. He also served as the Director of the National Philatelic Museum in Philadelphia from 1948 until 1960.

== Life ==
Bernard M. Davis was born in Kiev, Ukraine, on March 19, 1892. He migrated to the United States in 1913 at the age of 20 and settled in Philadelphia, where he ran various successful ventures within the textile industry, became a philately enthusiast, receiving the Luff Award in 1958, and a prolific art collector. He died on December 18, 1973, in Miami, Florida.

== Miami Museum of Modern Art ==
Davis founded the Miami Museum of Modern Art in 1962. The a two-story mansion where he hosted the museum was located at 2010 N. Bayshore Drive and also served as his residence. His museum became a prominent center for contemporary art in Miami, also showcasing Davis's extensive art collection. Although the museum had a relatively short lifespan, it made a significant impact on the art scene. Some notable artists Davis featured in his museum include:

- Purvis Young
- Dorothy Gillespie
- Ossip Zadkine
- Chaim Soutine
- Duane Hanson
- Roberto Pignataro
- Dianne Nance

== Support for Artists ==
Davis was a significant patron of many artists, providing them with platforms to showcase their work. He was particularly known for supporting Latin American artists, often being one of the first to exhibit their work in the United States. Notably, he supported Purvis Young, a self-taught artist from Miami, by providing him with painting supplies and helping to promote his work
