= Royal Philatelic Society of New Zealand =

New Zealand

The Royal Philatelic Society of New Zealand is an international society for collectors of the postage stamps and postal history of New Zealand and her Dependencies.

The Society was formed in 1888 by stamp collectors based in Wellington, New Zealand as The Philatelic Society of New Zealand. The Royal prefix was granted in 1946, and since then the Patron of the Society has been the Governor-General of New Zealand or the Governor-General's spouse.

A number of members have been appointed to the Roll of Distinguished Philatelists.

== Objects ==
The Society's primary function is to promote research and the publication of results for the stamps and postal history of New Zealand and her Dependencies.

The Society has the following additional objects, as listed in its rules:

- To arrange and conduct meetings for members and non-members.
- To exchange ideas relating to philately, and to promote the general advancement of philatelic knowledge.
- Research into stamps and philatelic material in general.
- To detect and expose philatelic forgeries and frauds.
- To form and maintain a library of philatelic literature and a reference collection of New Zealand and other stamps.
- To sell or otherwise dispose of stamps or other philatelic material among members.
- At its discretion to co-operate or affiliate with or assist financially or otherwise societies or bodies having objects similar or in part similar to the objects of the Society.
- To edit or publish books, papers or journals on philately.
- To promote, support or conduct philatelic exhibitions.
- To promote and take part in any other action for the benefit of philately in general as it sees fit.

== Publications ==
In 1956 the Society won the Crawford Medal of The Royal Philatelic Society London for the third volume of The Postage Stamps of New Zealand.
