= Spellman Museum of Stamps and Postal History =

Philatelic and postal museum in Weston, Massachusetts

Coordinates: 42°20′54.5″N 71°18′25.6″W

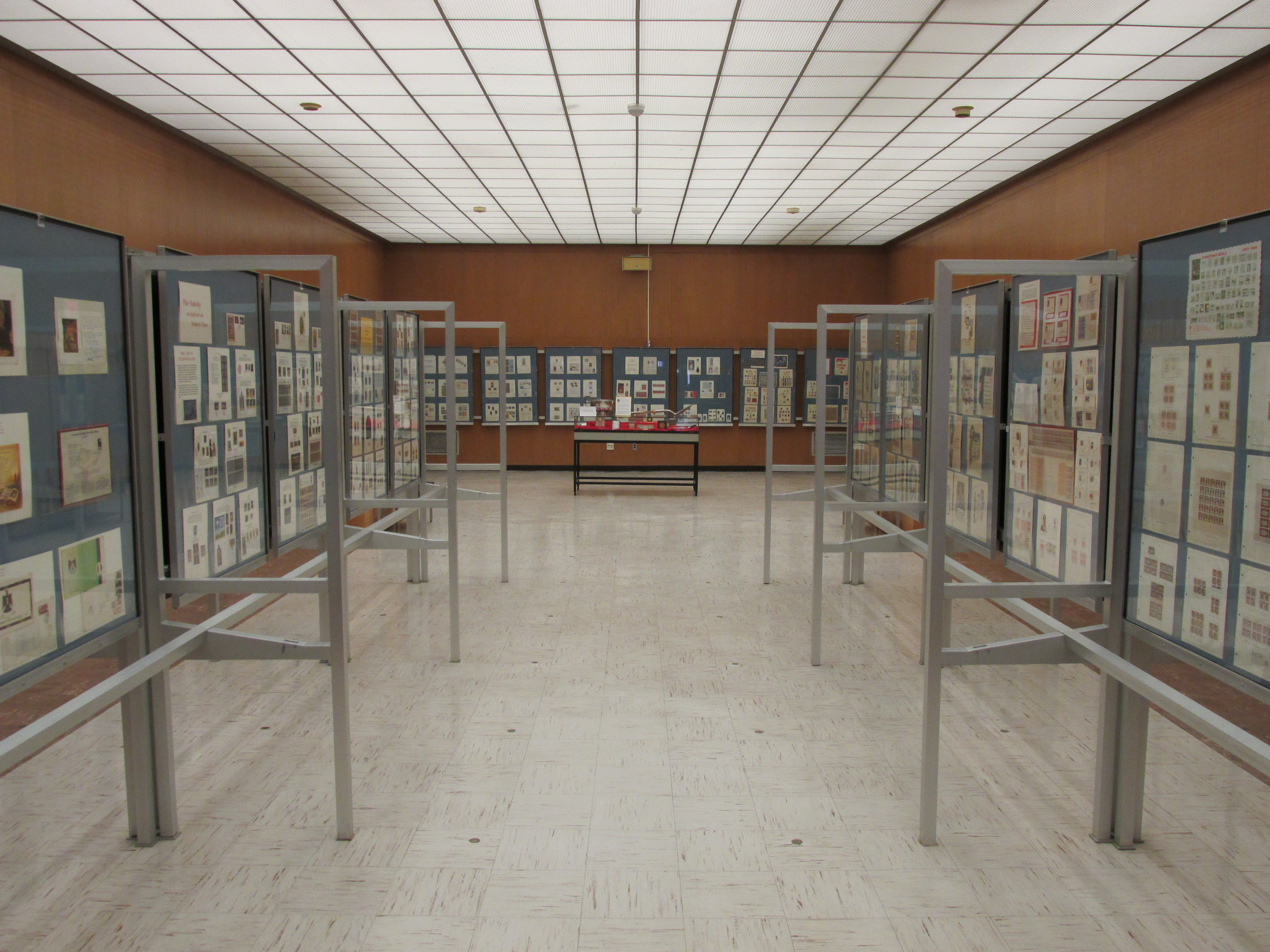
- Spellman Museum of Stamps and Postal History
- Founded: 1961
- Founder: Francis Joseph Cardinal Spellman
- Type: 501(c)(3) not-for-profit educational institution
- Purpose: Philately and Postal history
- Location: Regis College, Weston, Massachusetts
- Origins: Francis Cardinal Spellman and Philadelphia National Philatelic Museum stamp collections
- Region served: Worldwide
- Product: Philatelic and postal history exhibits, research services, public programming, and educational outreach for students of all ages
- Members: 400 (approx.)
- Executive Director: Brian Howard
- Curator: Ken Flowers
- Staff: 12 (2025)
- Volunteers: 35 (2025)
- Website: www.spellmanmuseum.org
- Second largest philatelic museum in the United States, oldest philatelic museum in the Americas

The Spellman Museum of Stamps and Postal History, originally known as the Cardinal Spellman Philatelic Museum, is a not-for-profit organization dedicated to the appreciation of diversity through the medium of postage stamps and postal history.

== Location ==
The museum is located at 241 Wellesley Street, on the campus of Regis College in Weston, Massachusetts. It is open to the public Thursdays through Sundays ten months of the year, and Thursday to Saturday in July and August.

== History ==
The Spellman Museum was founded in the early 1960s to house and share the collection of Cardinal Francis Spellman, Archbishop of New York (1939-1967) and a world-renowned philatelist.

Cardinal Spellman was introduced to the world of stamps by seminarian Lawrence Killian prior to World War I, while they were at the Pontifical North American College in Rome, Italy. Cardinal Spellman used stamps as souvenirs, having them signed to commemorate events in the church and in the world. During his years in Europe, he shipped stamps he had collected to Sister Fidelma Conway, CSJ, a colleague at Regis College, for safe keeping. Sister Fidelma acted as caretaker for his collection, which grew larger than could be housed in the space allocated by Regis. On March 14, 1962, ground was broken on campus for the museum.

In the late 1950s, the National Philatelic Museum in Philadelphia, aligned with Temple University, was dissolved. Most of its equipment, literature, and philatelic holdings were transferred to the newly incorporated Cardinal Spellman Philatelic Museum, which officially opened on May 4, 1963.

The museum now contains over two million items, ranging from postage stamps, to postal history, to artifacts of communications through the mails. Major holdings include Cardinal Spellman's personal collection and those from the former National Philatelic Museum, and collections or portions of collections donated or loaned by notables including Presidents Franklin D. Roosevelt and Dwight D. Eisenhower, musician Jascha Heifetz, and U.S. Army General Matthew Ridgway.

The museum updated its name to Spellman Museum of Stamps and Postal History in the 1990s. It operates as an independent not for profit, 501(c)(3), self-supporting educational institution and is chartered by the Commonwealth of Massachusetts.

== The Spellman philosophy ==
The museum's principal mission is to engage and teach diversity, history, and geography through philatelic exhibits, a research library, resource center, educational programming and community outreach.

Cardinal Spellman, around 1950, wrote:

Stamps are miniature documents of human history. They are the means by which a country gives sensible expression to its hopes and needs; its beliefs and ideals. They mirror the past and presage the future. They delineate cultural attainments, industrial works, domestic, civil and social life. In a word, these vignettes give a vivid picture of the world, its occupants and their multifarious endeavors.

== Funding ==
The museum is supported by a membership program, grants, annual donations, admission and research fees, retail sales, and an endowment.

== Organization ==
The museum is administered by a Board of Trustees and a Board of Corporators. Daily operations are addressed by a museum staff, led by an Executive Director, and supported by a cadre of dedicated volunteers.

== Special services ==
For a nominal charge, the museum will evaluate philatelic collections, and extract archived collections for private viewing.

The research library is open by appointment and houses an extensive international collection of philatelic literature, including thousands of books, catalogs, audiovisual media, and periodicals relating to stamps and postal history, as well as the history of philately and related subjects.

The museum also operates a facility rental program for interested groups and for hosting private events.

Special activities and public events are held at the museum, and are listed under Programs and Events tab on the museum website.

== See also ==
- Philately
