= The American Philatelist =

- Editor: Susanna Mills
- Categories: Philately
- Frequency: Monthly
- First issue: 1887
- Company: American Philatelic Society
- Country: United States
- Language: American English
- Website: stamps.org/the-american-philatelist

The American Philatelist, published by the American Philatelic Society, is one of the world's oldest philatelic magazines still in operation; its first issue having appeared in January 1887. The 1,500th issue of the journal was published in January 2026.

The magazine is published monthly for members of the APS. It has the appearance of a standard glossy color magazine, typically running about 100 pages per issue. As the house organ, there are monthly departments covering APS news and activities, a president's column, and so forth. The core of the magazine consists of 5-10 articles on subjects related to philately, ranging from highly technical subjects such as "Accra overprints on Gold Coast stamps", to the fictional stamps and envelopes that have been used as movie props.

Other regular departments include "The Glassine Surfer", a column reviewing online resources for collectors, book reviews, and U.S. new issues.

The magazine takes both display advertising and classified advertising.
