= WsRadio =

wsRadio (World Syndicated Radio) is an Internet talk radio network which started broadcasting on August 15, 2001 with 5 shows and grew to over 120 shows. In 2008, wsRadio had over $1 million in advertising revenue, including eBay Radio and PayPal Radio. By early 2021, the station had closed down.
