= United States Stamp Society =

- Founded: 1926
- Type: not-for-profit organization
- Purpose: entire U.S. postage stamp and postal history scene
- Location: USA
- Origins: Philatelic Plate Number Association and the Bureau Issues Association
- Region served: Worldwide
- Method: research, study groups, convention, committees, awards
- Revenue: membership fees
- Website: http://www.usstamps.org/
- publishes The United States Specialist

The United States Stamp Society (USSS) is the largest philatelic organization dedicated to the research and study of United States postage and revenue stamps. The Society is a non-profit collector-based organization with a world-wide membership of over 1700. The USSS is Affiliate #150 of the American Philatelic Society (APS). Since 1930 the Society has encouraged philatelic study through voluntary membership in specialized committees, including those for specific stamp issues like the Washington-Franklins, the Prexies or the Liberty Series, and areas of U.S. philately such as Plate Numbers, Marginal Markings, Private Vending and Affixing Perforations, Booklets and Panes, and Luminescence. Research is made available through published books, research papers and articles in the monthly journal, The United States Specialist.

== History ==
The Society was founded as the Philatelic Plate Number Association in 1926. The name was changed in 1930 to the Bureau Issues Association, recognizing the Association’s enlarged scope of interest as the entire philatelic output of the Bureau of Engraving and Printing. At that time the Bureau of Engraving and Printing produced all United States postage and revenue stamps. Instead of plate numbers only, the Bureau’s output of postage and revenue stamps, coils, booklets, possessions, paper, gum, marginal markings, as well as methods of manufacture became subjects of study and collection.

In 2000, the organization became the United States Stamp Society. The new name reflects the society’s continuing focus on U.S. postage and revenue stamps while recognizing the role of non-Bureau contract security printers in stamp design and production.

Members of USSS receive the authoritative monthly journal, The United States Specialist, which is devoted to all aspects of U.S. philately. Over the years The Specialist has been especially strong in reporting on stamp printing technology, plate varieties, plate layouts, marginal markings and plate numbering. Many important discoveries in U.S. collecting have been published in its pages which have resulted in new and variety listings in the Scott Specialized Catalogue of U.S. Stamps and Covers.

== See also ==
- Postage stamps and postal history of the United States
