= Scandinavian Collectors Club =

- Founded: 1935
- Type: incorporated in the State of Delaware
- Purpose: the countries of Åland, Aunus, the Danish West Indies, Denmark, Faroe Islands, Finland, Greenland, Iceland, Karelia, North Ingermanland, Norway, Slesvig, and Sweden
- Location: USA
- Origins: Finnish-American Stamp Club
- Region served: Worldwide
- Method: exhibits, meetings, philatelic events
- Affiliations: American Philatelic Society
- Website: www.scc-online.org

The Scandinavian Collectors Club is a United States–based philatelic society dedicated to the collection and study of the postage stamps and postal history of the Scandinavia region, including the geographical regions of Åland, Aunus, the Danish West Indies, Denmark, Faroe Islands, Finland, Greenland, Iceland, Karelia, North Ingermanland, Norway, Slesvig, and Sweden.

== History ==
The club was founded in 1935 in New York City as the Finnish-American Stamp Club. On February 13, 1942, the club changed its name to the Scandinavian Collectors Club of New York, and, in 1959, it changed its name again to Scandinavian Collectors Club and chapters were formed. On April 26, 1960, the club was incorporated in the state of Illinois and operated in the Chicago, Illinois, area. The society decided to broaden its appeal internationally, and re-incorporated in the state of Delaware.

== Membership ==
Membership is open to all collectors and students of Scandinavian philately.

== Chapters ==
In addition to being centralized in the Chicago area, the club has formed various local chapters to serve the needs of collectors nationally and internationally. Chapters are located in various places, including Seattle, Chicago, New York City, New Jersey, Iceland, Washington, D.C., Delaware, Minnesota, California, Texas, Canada, Virginia, and Colorado.

== Services ==
The organization conducts meetings, study groups, provides library services, a Scandinavian stamp mart, and provides exhibition judges as well as providing information for members related to upcoming philatelic exhibitions.

== The Posthorn ==
The society issues its own journal, entitled The Posthorn. The journal has been in continuous publication since 1943, and is published quarterly.

== By-laws ==
The club is governed by a set of by-laws which state its primary purpose is to "promote fellowship and communication among collectors of Scandinavian philatelic material." The organization is governed by eleven elected officers, a president, 2 vice presidents, secretary, treasurer and 6 directors.

== See also ==
- Scandinavia philatelic society
- Stamp collecting
