= American Philatelic Research Library =

- Location: 100 Match Factory Place; Bellefonte, Pennsylvania 16823, United States
- Type: Research library
- Established: October 1968; 57 years ago

Other information
- Website: www.stamplibrary.org

The American Philatelic Research Library (APRL), based in Bellefonte, Pennsylvania, is the largest public philatelic library in the United States. In fiscal year 2024 it reported total assets of $12,986,645; total revenue of $1,067,552; and total expenses of $1,398,014.

The library serves the needs of the members of the American Philatelic Society (APS) – with which it is closely affiliated and shares premises – and the public. It has more than 21,000 book titles and 5,700 journal titles. Its current 19,000-square-foot (1,800 m^{2}) building opened in 2016.

== Legal status ==
The library is a public library under Pennsylvania law and is registered with the United States Internal Revenue Service as a 501(c)(3) non-profit corporation under EIN 25-1213435 with a ruling year of 1969. Donations are treated as a charitable deduction for the purposes of United States federal income tax.

The APRL's mission is "preservation of philatelic literature; serves the public through the lending and preservation of philatelic literature; creation and maintenance of indexes; maintenance of archives and philatelic memorabila [sic]; creation of exhibits; and publication of philatelic literature review.”

== Governance ==
The library is run by a nine-member Board of Trustees. Each member serves for six years. Three members are elected by the American Philatelic Society membership, three are appointed by the President of the APS and three are elected by the founders and patrons of the APRL.

- Officers and Trustees
  - Murray Abramson, President
  - Andrew Kelley, Vice President
  - Matthew Healey, Secretary
  - Larry Haber, Treasurer
  - Michael Bloom
  - Jean Wang
  - Casey Jo White
  - Matt Liebson
  - Barry Feddema

== Magazine ==
The library publishes a quarterly magazine, the Philatelic Literature Review (ISSN 0270-1707), which includes book reviews, bibliographies, and other relevant content.

== See also ==
- List of philatelic libraries
- International Philatelic Libraries Association
- Philatelic literature
- Pennsylvania Match Company
