= American Philatelic Society =

American philatelic organization

- Abbreviation: APS
- Founded: September 14, 1886; 140 years ago
- Founder: John Kerr Tiffany
- Type: Educational 501(c)(3)
- Tax ID no.: 24-0772797
- Purpose: Philately; Stamp collecting
- Location(s): American Philatelic Center; 100 Match Factory Place; Bellefonte, PA U.S.
- Origins: The Committee on National Organization
- Region served: Worldwide
- Product: education, publications and services
- Members: 20,906 (March 31, 2026)
- President: Mark Banchik
- Executive Director: Kirk Gillis
- Publication: The American Philatelist
- Revenue: $5,899,950 (2024)
- Expenses: $3,757,564 (2011)
- Endowment: $5,563,869 (2011)
- Staff: 34 (2023)
- Website: stamps.org
- Formerly called: American Philatelic Association

The American Philatelic Society (APS) is the largest nonprofit stamp collecting foundation of philately in the world. Both the membership and interests of the society are worldwide.

== History ==
The organization, originally named the American Philatelic Association, was established on September 14, 1886, in New York City, and the following day elected John Kerr Tiffany as its first president. Voting membership was granted to 219 individuals who paid two bits (25¢) for the privilege. The organization's name was changed to its present name for a few months in 1897, then back, then permanently in 1908.

Society membership reached over 4,000 in 1940 and included U.S. President Franklin D. Roosevelt and his Secretary of the Interior Harold L. Ickes. At the 1942 APS convention, board member Donald Lybarger argued for the creation of a central office near the geographic center of the philatelic community, but not in a large city. When he was elected APS President in 1943, he was able to turn his vision into reality. At the 1944 APS convention it was announced that the APS would accept applications for the position of Executive Secretary. H. Clay Musser of State College, Pennsylvania, was selected and the APS office was established there on April 1, 1945. As a testament to their leadership, the APS became the US representative to the Federation Internationale de Philatelie in 1947.

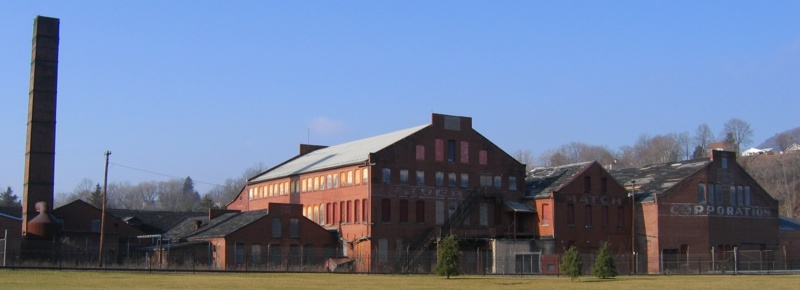
Pennsylvania Match Company prior to APS acquisition

By the mid-1990s, the expanded services, staff and the American Philatelic Research Library had outgrown the facility in State College. A study determined that because of high local real estate values, it was not cost effective to expand the existing building. A search of alternatives identified a property ten miles (sixteen kilometers) from State College that was basically sound and could be acquired for a reasonable amount. In 2002, after much discussion, debate and soul searching, the APS committed millions of dollars to purchasing and renovating what was known as the Match Factory in Bellefonte, Pennsylvania. The American Philatelic Center was dedicated in June 2004.

== Philatelic services ==
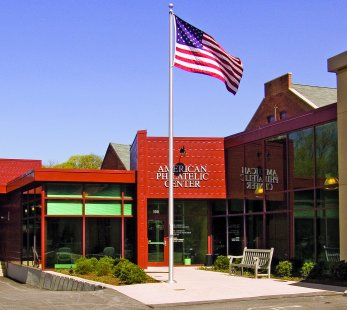
APS headquarters in the renovated Match Factory

The APS offers numerous services to its members:

- The American Philatelist - monthly magazine
- StampStore - online stamp buying and selling
- Member sales circuits - for most collecting specialties via mail
- American Philatelic Research Library
- Stamp insurance - for stamp collectors
- American Philatelic Expertizing Service - stamp authentication
- Judging Accreditation for stamp competition
- Stamp education opportunities
- Dispute resolution - between members
- American Philatelic Society Hall of Fame
- APS Stamp Talk with Nancy Clark on internet radio talk station wsRadio (through 2024)

== Members ==
APS membership includes over 600 commercial stamp dealers and about 450 local stamp clubs. In addition, nearly 200 specialty societies are affiliated with the APS. There are APS members from 110 countries of the world. Individual membership reached a high of 57,815 in 1988 and stood at 24,421 as of April 30, 2023.

== Events ==
The organization has two national events each year: APS AmeriStamp Expo is held each Winter and Great American Stamp Show is scheduled in the Summer. Both shows rotate to different locations around the country. The Summer event is the largest annual national show with 150 dealers, 10,000 pages of exhibits, meetings of more than 25 national societies, and over 100 educational seminars. Local stamp clubs host smaller shows, some several times each year.

According to the 2019 version of the ARIPEX website, the 61st annual APS show was held 15–17 February 2019 in Mesa, AZ, and was "the last winter show conducted by the APS."

== Honors and awards ==
The society honors those who serve honorably and notably in the field of philately. The American Philatelic Society Hall of Fame honors those now-deceased philatelists who have served philately. In addition, the society honors living distinguished philatelists for their contributions to the field with the Luff Award.

== Controversy ==
Around 1970, numerous newly independent countries realized that issuing stamps was an excellent source of revenue. Because the stamps were sent to other countries, there was little risk of the stamps actually being used for postage. Historically, a country issued stamps to commemorate an event or honor a national figure, but these new nations created stamps that appealed to popular collecting themes, such as Disney figures, airplanes or space, famous people in the world. Instead of releasing a single stamp, they would create a set, with values ranging from a penny to five dollars. The APS was appalled and created the “black blot” program. The society published a monthly magazine for members and began to include a list of new stamp issues that were judged to be overpriced or unnecessary. A country with high illiteracy and a marginal postal service did not require 100 different stamps each year. However, many collectors rebelled at being told to reject some stamps, and the program was eventually dropped.

== Post office ==
The original board and batten post office from Headsville, West Virginia, in service from 1860 to 1914, was purchased by the Smithsonian Institution in 1971, disassembled and moved to Washington, D.C., reassembled and opened as an example of a country store-post office for the Smithsonian's 125th anniversary in 1971. It operated as a contract post office there until 2006 when the National Museum of American History closed for renovations. The historic building was again disassembled and moved to Bellefonte on loan to the APS. It was reassembled and again operates as a contract post office.

== See also ==
- American Philatelic Research Library
- American Philatelic Society Hall of Fame
- The American Philatelist
