= Higgins & Gage World Postal Stationery Catalog =

In philately, the Higgins & Gage World Postal Stationery Catalog is the most recent encyclopedic catalogue of postal stationery covering the whole world. Despite most volumes not having been updated for over thirty years, the catalogue and the H & G numbering system are still widely used by philatelists and stamp dealers although the values given in the catalogue are out of date.

The catalogue was published between 1964 and 1989 and comprises nineteen alphabetical volumes with supplements. The earlier volumes were edited by Edward Fladung who worked with Alexander D. Gage in the production of the catalogue. Later editions were edited by Melvin Feiner.

== Publisher ==
Originally published by Higgins & Gage Inc., the catalogue has now been acquired by Classic Philatelics of Huntington Beach, Pasadena, California. Classic Philatelics also produce a new issue postal stationery report.

== Scope ==
The postal stationery items which are included in the catalog are stamped envelopes, postal cards, lettercards, wrappers, aerograms and registration envelopes

== List of volumes ==
(Titles from most recent editions)

- Vol.1 Abu Dhabi to Azores
- Vol.2 Baden to Bushire
- Vol.3 Cameroons to Czechoslovakia
- Vol.4 Dahomey to Dutch New Guinea
- Vol.5 East Africa to Ethiopia
- Vol.6 Falkland Islands to Funchal
- Vol.7 Gabon to Guyana
- Vol.8 Haiti to Hungary
- Vol.9 Iceland to Ivory Coast
- Vol.10 Jamaica to Kuwait
- Vol.11 Labuan to Luxemburg
- Vol.12 Macao to Muscat
- Vol.13 Natal to Orange River Colony
- Vol.14 Pakistan to Queensland
- Vol.15 Reunion Islands to Ryukyu Islands
- Vol.16 Sarr to Syria
- Vol.17 Tahiti to Turks & Caicos Islands
- Vol.18 Ubangi to Uruguay
- Vol.19 Vatican City to Zululand
