= Postal history =

Study of postal systems

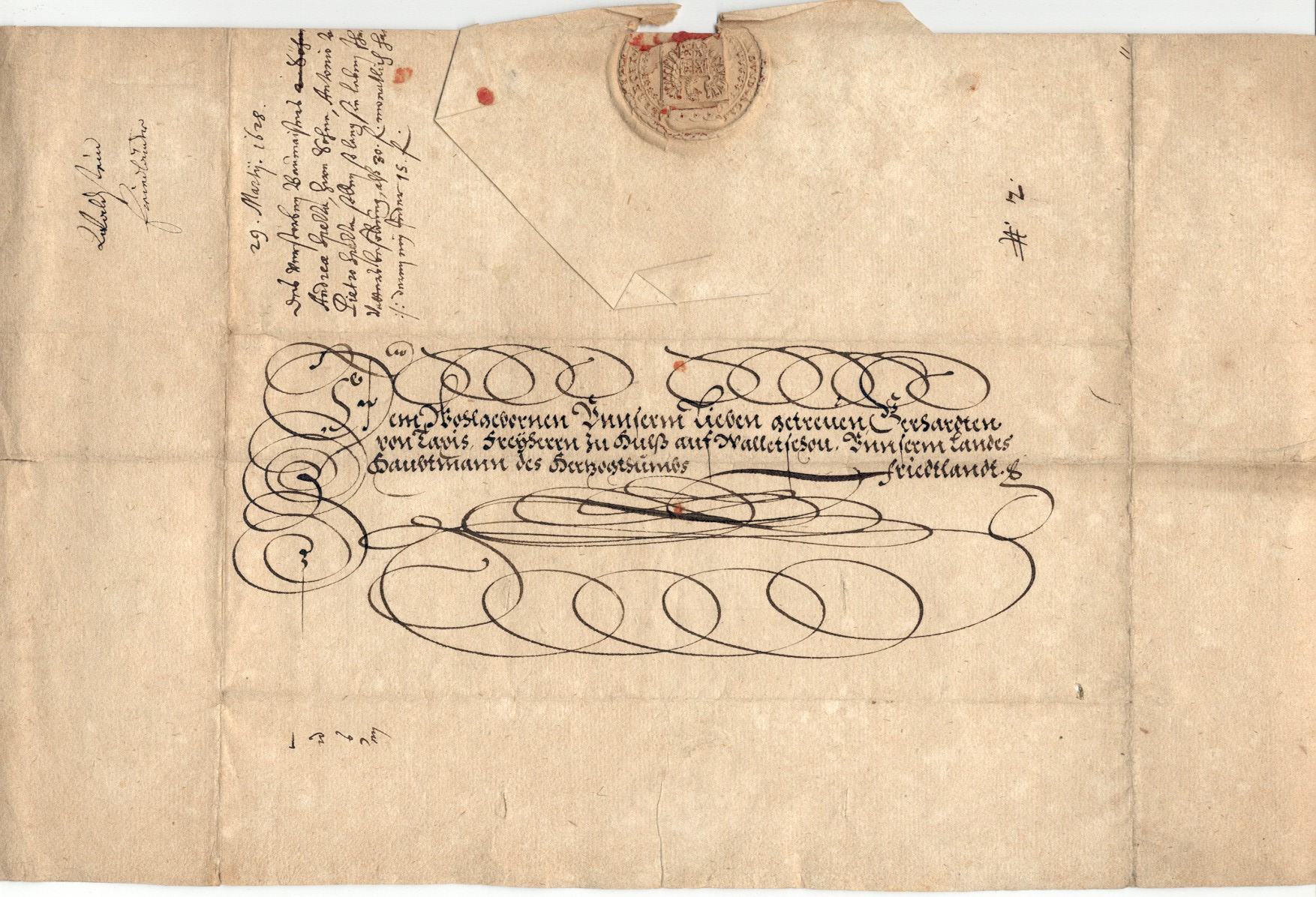
Pre-stamp 1628 lettersheet opened up showing folds, address and seal, with letter being written on the obverse

Postal history is the study of postal systems and how they operate and, or, the study of the use of postage stamps and covers and associated postal artifacts illustrating historical episodes in the development of postal systems. The term is attributed to Robson Lowe, a professional philatelist, stamp dealer and stamp auctioneer, who made the first organised study of the subject in the 1930s and described philatelists as "students of science", but postal historians as "students of humanity". More precisely, philatelists describe postal history as the study of rates, routes, markings, and means (of transport).

== A collecting speciality ==
Postal history has become a philatelic collecting speciality in its own right. Whereas traditional philately is concerned with the study of the stamps per se, including the technical aspects of stamp production and distribution, philatelic postal history refers to stamps as historical documents; similarly re postmarks, postcards, envelopes and the letters they contain. Postal history can include the study of postal rates, postal policy, postal administration, political effects on postal systems, postal surveillance and the consequences of politics, business, and culture on postal systems; basically anything to do with the function of the collection, transportation and delivery of mail. The specialized area of philatelic history defines postal history as the study of rates charged for postal services provided, routes followed and special handling of letters. Areas of special interest include disrupted or transitional periods, such as wars and military occupations, and mail to remote areas.

The philatelic-based definition of the term developed as the discipline developed. Philatelic students discovered that understanding and authentication of stamps depended on knowing why postal authorities issued particular stamps, where they were used and how. For instance, a stamp apparently used before any other stamp of its type could be proved a forgery if it was postmarked at a location known not to have received any stamps until a later date.

Much information is still not known about the workings of postal systems, and millions of old covers have survived, constituting a rich field of "artifacts" for analysis.

== Possible areas of study ==
In studying or collecting any postal history subject some overlap is inevitable because it is impossible to separate the different areas that affect the mail from one another; transportation, rates, geography and subject are all intertwined, but the emphasis remains different depending on the chosen topic. The postal history topics described below are some of the better known and popular topics.

=== Geographically based studies ===
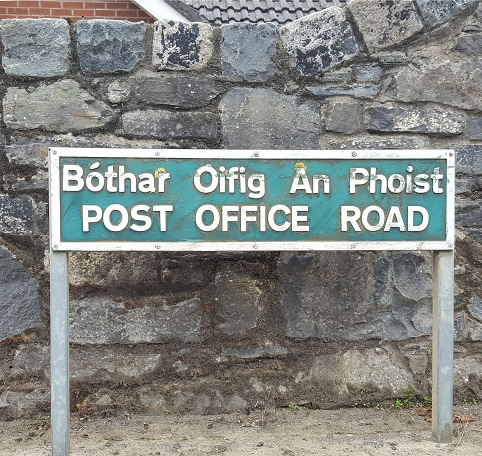
With the growth of urban centres across the Western hemisphere in the 19th century Post Offices were located on main arterial routes

- Regional studies are typically based on a geographical area, such as countries of origin, native districts, cities, towns or villages, places associated with family roots, or workplaces. In the past collectors usually based their studies on "mail from," but "mail to" and "mail through" a place expand the postal service story because outgoing mail mainly shows marking associated with the areas of study while incoming mail tells a much broader story and are now more likely to be included. It is best to select a topic to study that is broad enough because narrow geographical boundaries will likely bring frustration due to the lack of material available. Examples are: Postal History of Brünn 1638-1875, and Private and Foreign Post Offices in St. Thomas.
- Postal routes are alternate geographical based study areas that provide great variety due to the many places and services available along a route. For instance; a study of the Thurn-und-Taxis Post route from Antwerp to Florence via Mantua would include much of the early postal history of Western Europe and the Postal History of the First Transcontinental Railroad can show a good range of stamps, stationery, and associated marking across 3,000 miles that started in 1869.

The era for a geographical based study can add dimension depending on the services available or the changes that took place. The period should seek to tell a complete story and not limit the chosen topic.

=== Transportation based studies ===
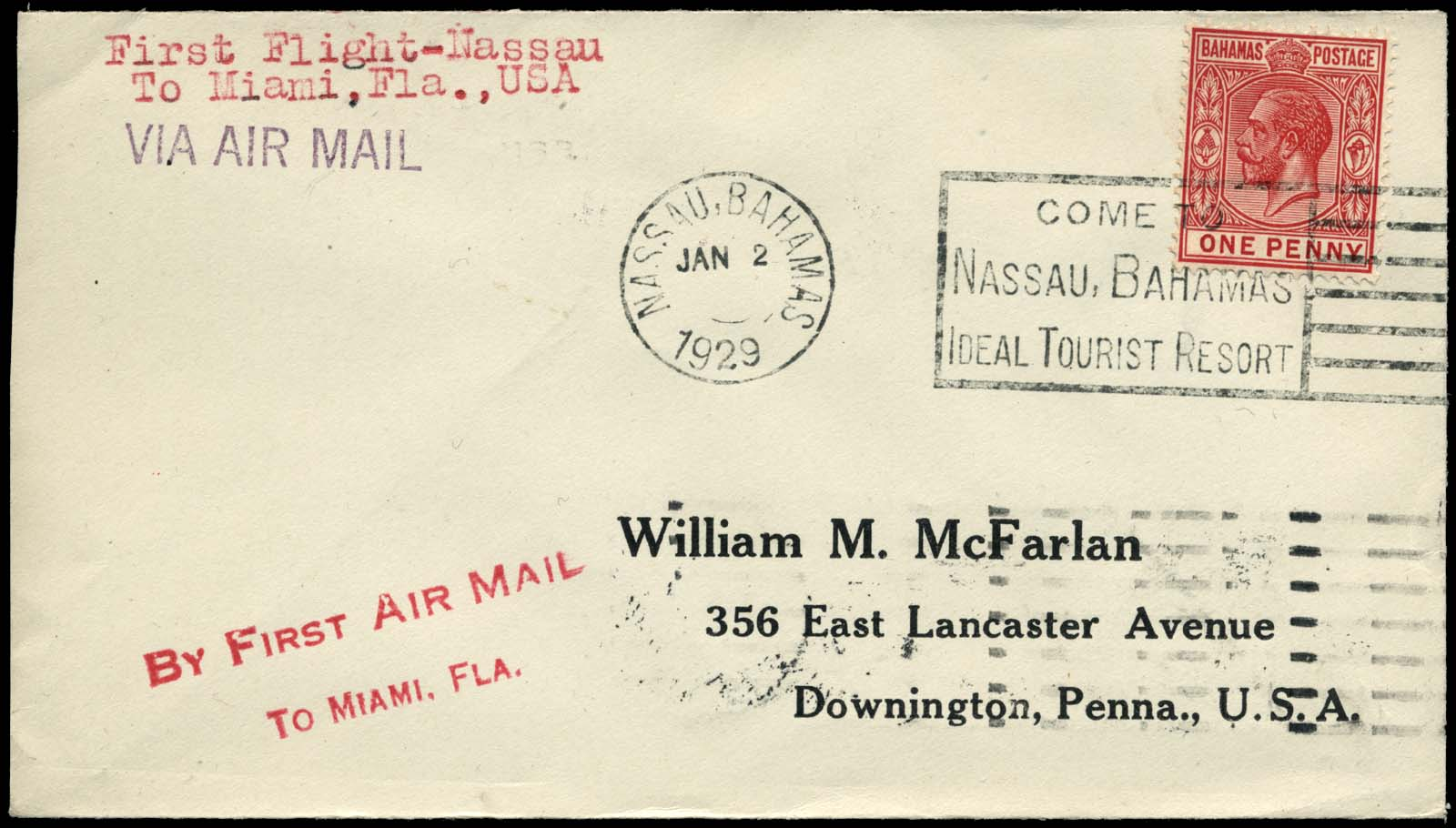
First flight cover for Nassau to Miami airmail route in 1929

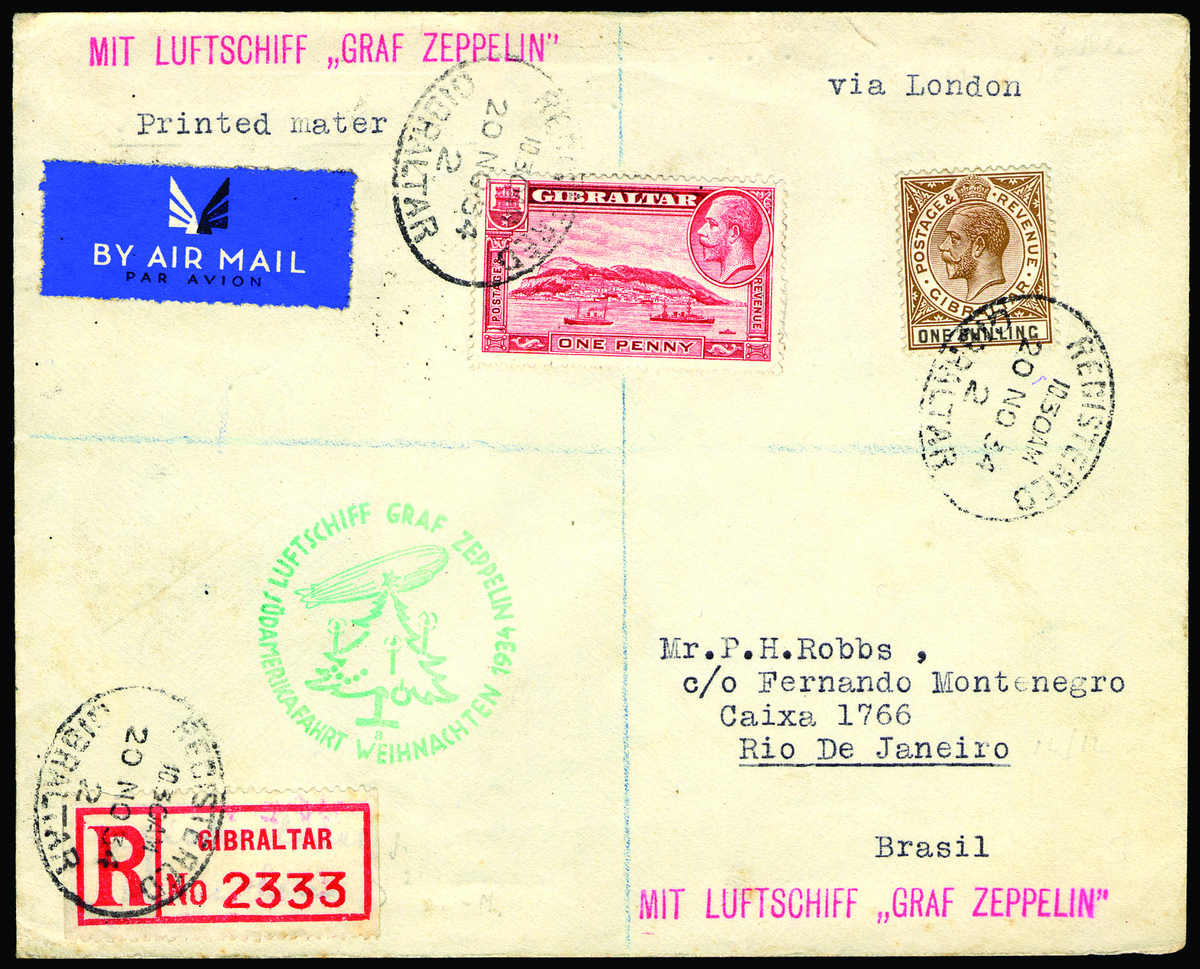
Zeppelin mail from Gibraltar to Rio de Janeiro, Brazil via Berlin on the Christmas flight (12th South American flight) of 1934

- Aerophilately specialises in the study of airmail. Philatelists observe the development of mail transport by air from its beginning, and most aspects of airmail service have been extensively studied and documented by specialists, some of which are individually listed. Crash covers, Imperial Airways Empire route mail to Australia and South Africa, CAM (Contract Air Mail) or FAM (Foreign Air Mail) routes to and from the United States are a few topics.
- Balloon mail was employed during the Siege of Paris to get mail out of the city during the Franco-Prussian War in 1870. Balloons can be both manned and unmanned but balloon mail is not a common form of mail transport.
- Maritime mail is a theme that offers a wide variety of possibilities. Study of a particular shipping line like, Cunard, P&O and Danube steamers, South American packets or American steamboat mail are a few options as are; Ship Letter marks, mail between a mother country and its colonies or mail between two countries separated by seas or oceans. Many ships applied their own endorsements so collecting examples of all ships of a particular shipping line can be aspired to. Maiden voyages and wreck covers are very desirable. Maritime mail rates changed frequently and occasionally varied for different shipping lines over the same route that could be due to treaty changes or arguments between countries that involved retaliatory rates. Naval mail can also fall in the Military mail category and are also known to apply identifying endorsements or postmarks.
- Railway mail refers to mail carried partly, or fully, by rail transport from its inception in 1830 on the Liverpool & Manchester Railway in England until its decline in the late 20th century that include railway letter stamped mail, TPO and RPO handstamps, instructional handstamps or manuscript notations, or even the First transcontinental railroad (also mentioned as a geographic study above).
- Rocket mail is the delivery of mail by rocket or missile and is a specialised collecting area of aerophilately called Astrophilately. One of the early famous rocketeers was Stephen Smith, a Secretary of the Indian Airmail Society, who launched 270 rockets between 1934 and 1944 of which 80 contained mail. Other topics for consideration are: USPS rocket mail from 1936 or 1959 launches, Russian submarine-launched rocket mail, or reusable launch vehicle mail.
- Zeppelin mail is a popular topic for the mail carried on the German Zeppelin airships between 1908 and 1939. Much mail exists because up to 12 tons was carried on each flight. Mail from within Germany and from the several trans-Atlantic flights are extant however mail from the famous Hindenburg disaster are very scarce.

=== Subject based studies ===
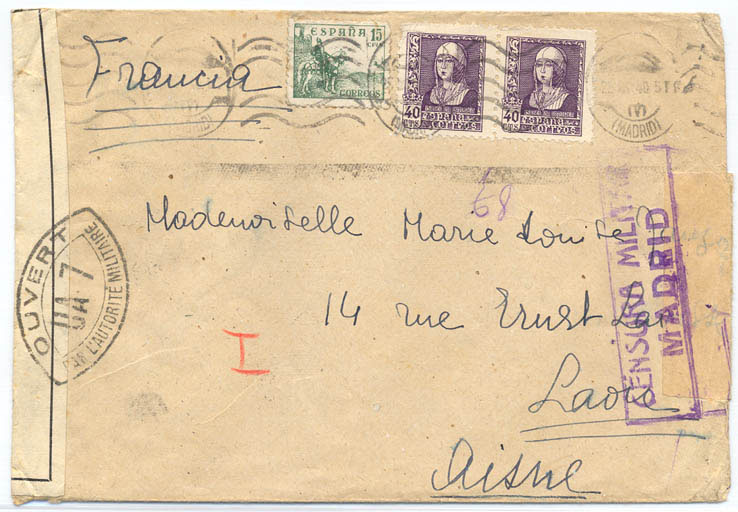
Postal censorship of 1940 civil cover from Madrid to Paris opened by both Spanish and French (Vichy) authorities

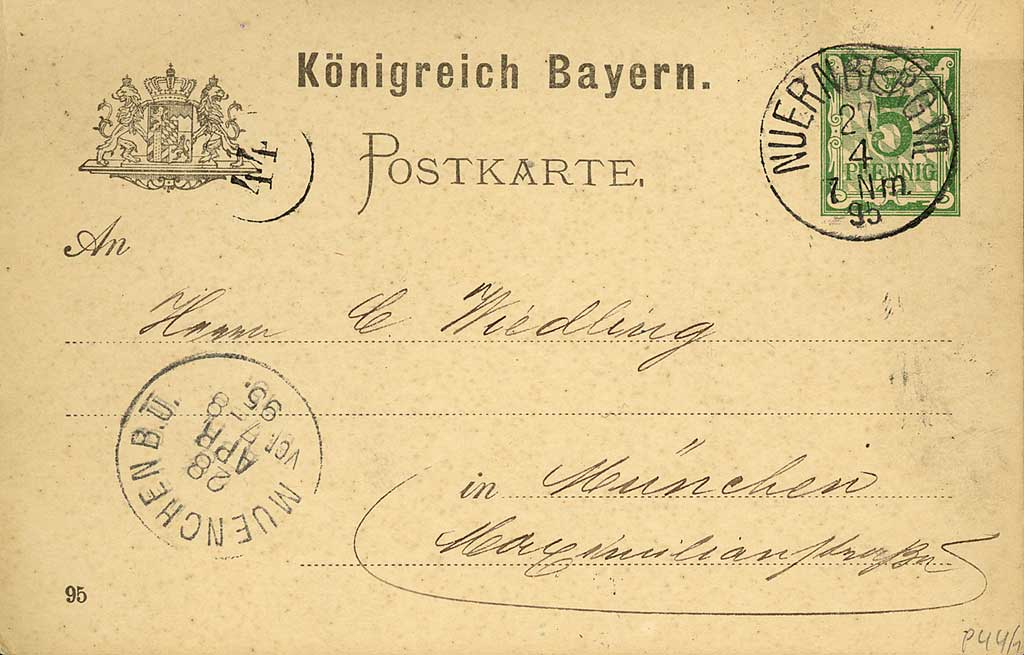
Bavarian postal stationery postcard used from Nuremberg to Munich in 1895

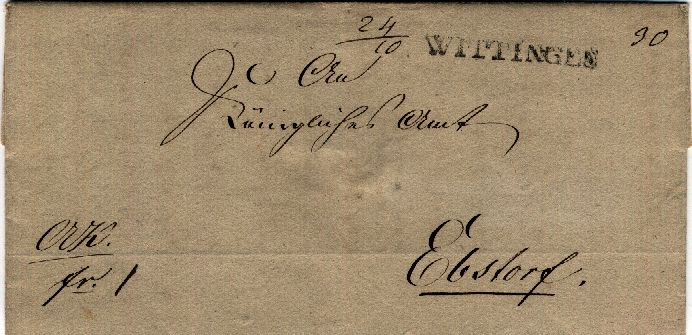
1834 pre-adhesive mail with Wittingen straight-line town handstamp to Ebsdorf

- Express mail is an accelerated delivery service for which the customer pays a surcharge and receives faster delivery. Haste Poste Haste letters of the 17th century can be considered precursors of modern Express mail as was the Pony Express mail. The service for domestic mail is governed by a country's own postal administration but since 1998 the international accelerated delivery services are governed by the EMS Cooperative of the Universal Postal Union (UPU). Studies of domestic, or international express mail are possible as are studies of the Express mail rates.
- Marcophily is the study of postmarks, cancellations and postal markings applied by hand or machine. Though not strictly a postal history topic, it can be collected as one. It offers vast areas to select a topic for study or collection as the marcopholist is more interested in the details, style and design of the markings than the reason why and where a letter was sent. Large cities that have many post offices offer great study opportunities due to the vast range of handstamps or machine cancellations in use over any time period.
- Military mail is mail associated with any of the armed services or peacekeeping forces, or formed around any particular military campaign, like the First and Second Opium Wars, Spanish Civil War, World War I and II, or even the recent conflicts in Afghanistan or Iraq. Covers mailed from navy vessels are also widely sought, the cover usually having a distinctive postmark bearing the ship's name and date of mailing, the date often being of particular historical significance and interest. Many older letters from these sources, when available, provide insight into the conditions of the people involved.
- Parcel post is perhaps the least collected, or studied, area of postal history due to the size of potential material much of which is never saved. From 1883 Special labels were applied to parcels in Great Britain. International parcels handling tend to gather Customs evidence making for attractive material.
- Postal censorship, both overt and covert, has been performed on mail long before the World Wars of the 20th century and can include both civil and military censorship. It has mainly taken place during times of conflict though has also been performed during other times like; periods of civil disorder or a state of emergency. An example of covert postal censorship is the Cabinet noir.
- Postal rates are an extensive area of study that can be made by country, time period, or even currency. Postal rates were often set bilaterally, by postal conventions between nations, such as the 1817 and 1837 postal treaties between France and Prussia, and the 1847 and 1853 conventions between the United States and Bremen (a city-state at the time). Stamp collectors may study the rates in effect during the time of issue of the postage stamps they collect thereby augmenting their collections.
- Postal stationery are mailable products, issued by postal authorities, such as envelopes, letter sheets, postcards, lettercards, aerograms or wrappers, on which the amount of postage has usually been pre-printed with an imprinted stamp or indicium, at the rate required for a particular postal service. Postal stationery is generally sold at post offices. Each stationery type can be an area of study in its own right but can also be studied by country or by time period. Studies of mint (unused) postal stationery are considered to be traditional philately, while studies of how postal stationery was used are considered to be postal history.
- Pre-adhesive mail, also called pre-stamp mail, is mail used before the issuance of the Penny Black and Two Pence Blue stamps on 6 May 1840 in the United Kingdom of Great Britain and Ireland, and in other countries, mail used prior to the postal authority adopting their own adhesive labels. The material can range from court and government letters before official public mail services to distinctive town-marks worldwide.
- Prisoner-of-war mail can be a subcategory of either, or both, Military mail or Postal censorship.
- Registered mail are often used to mail items, or documents, considered valuable and need a chain of custody that provides more control than regular mail. The letters have their details recorded in a register to enable their location to be tracked and offer many distinctive handstamps. Many countries have issued special postal stationery for Registered mail expanding the possible areas being studied beyond regular registered letters. Earlier similar services were known as Money Letters

== See also ==
- Timeline of postal history
- Pony Express
- London Penny Post
- First day cover
