= Oxford and Cambridge college stamps =

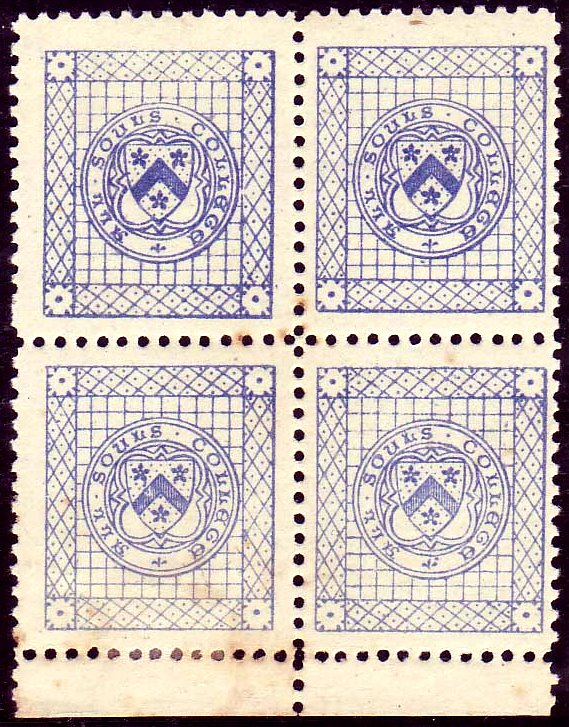
Stamps of All Souls College, Oxford.

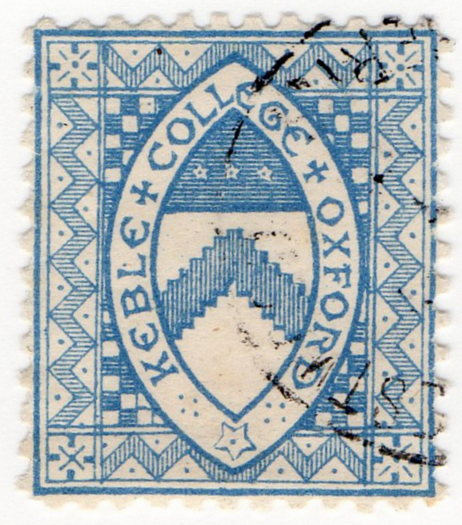
A stamp of Keble College, 1882.

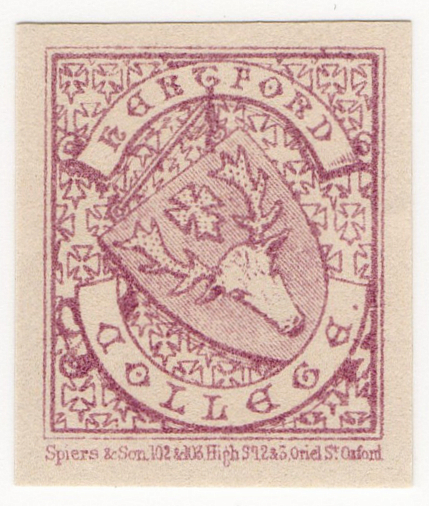
An imperforate stamp of Hertford College.

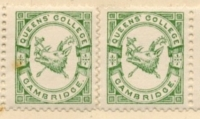
Queens' College, Cambridge stamps

From 1871 to 1886 certain Oxford and Cambridge colleges issued their own stamps to be sold to members of the college so that they could pre-pay the cost of a college messenger delivering their mail.

The practice was stopped in 1886 by the General Post Office as it was decided that it was in contravention of its monopoly.

== Issuers ==
The colleges which issued the stamps were:

=== Oxford ===
- Keble 1871#
- Merton 1876#
- Hertford 1879#
- Lincoln 1877
- Exeter 1882#
- St John's 1884
- All Souls 1884
- Balliol 1885 (Printed but never issued)

=== Cambridge ===
- Selwyn 1882
- Queens' 1883
- St John's 1884

== Postal stationery ==
Postal stationery was also used by some of the colleges listed above (post cards, envelopes) which were impressed with a pre-paid stamp. This is denoted by # above and in some cases postal stationery was in use for several years before stamps came into use, for instance at Hertford College.
