= Postage stamps and postal history of Martinique =

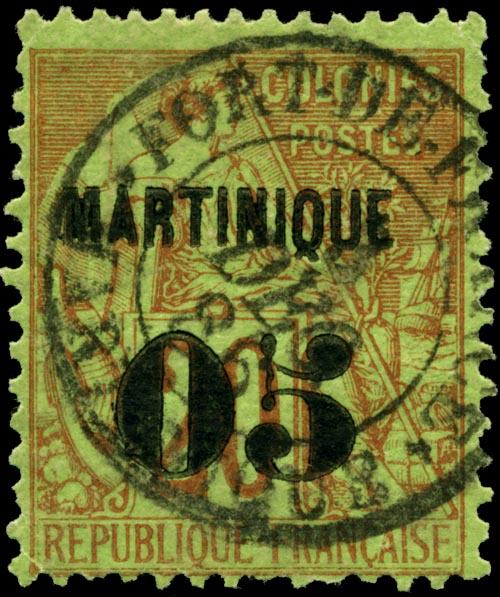
French colonies stamp overprinted for Martinique in 1888

This is a survey of the postage stamps and postal history of Martinique.

Martinique is an island in the eastern Caribbean. To the northwest lies Dominica, to the south St Lucia, and to the southeast Barbados. It is an overseas region of France.

== First stamps ==
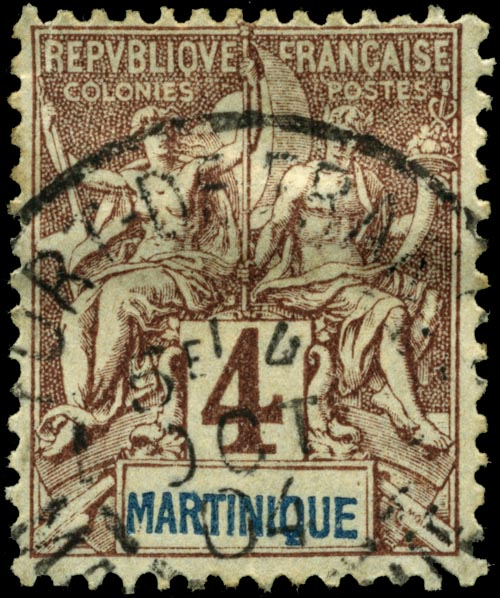
An 1892 stamp of Martinique

Stamps of France were used in Martinique from 1851, and the French colonies general issues from 1859.

The first stamp of Martinique was issued on 18 July 1886, overprinting "Martinique" on the French colonies general issues. In 1892, the first definitive set, the French colonial series, was issued. A series of pictorial stamps issued in 1908 featured local themes.

Martinique has used the stamps of France since becoming an overseas region in 1974.

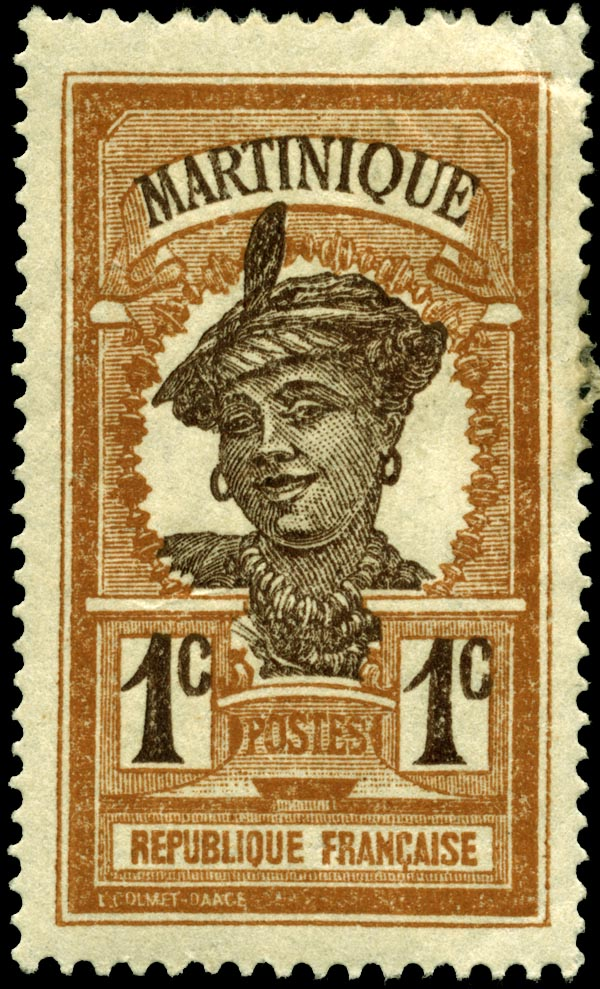
A 1908 stamp of Martinique

== See also ==
- Postage stamps of the French Colonies
