= Formular stationery =

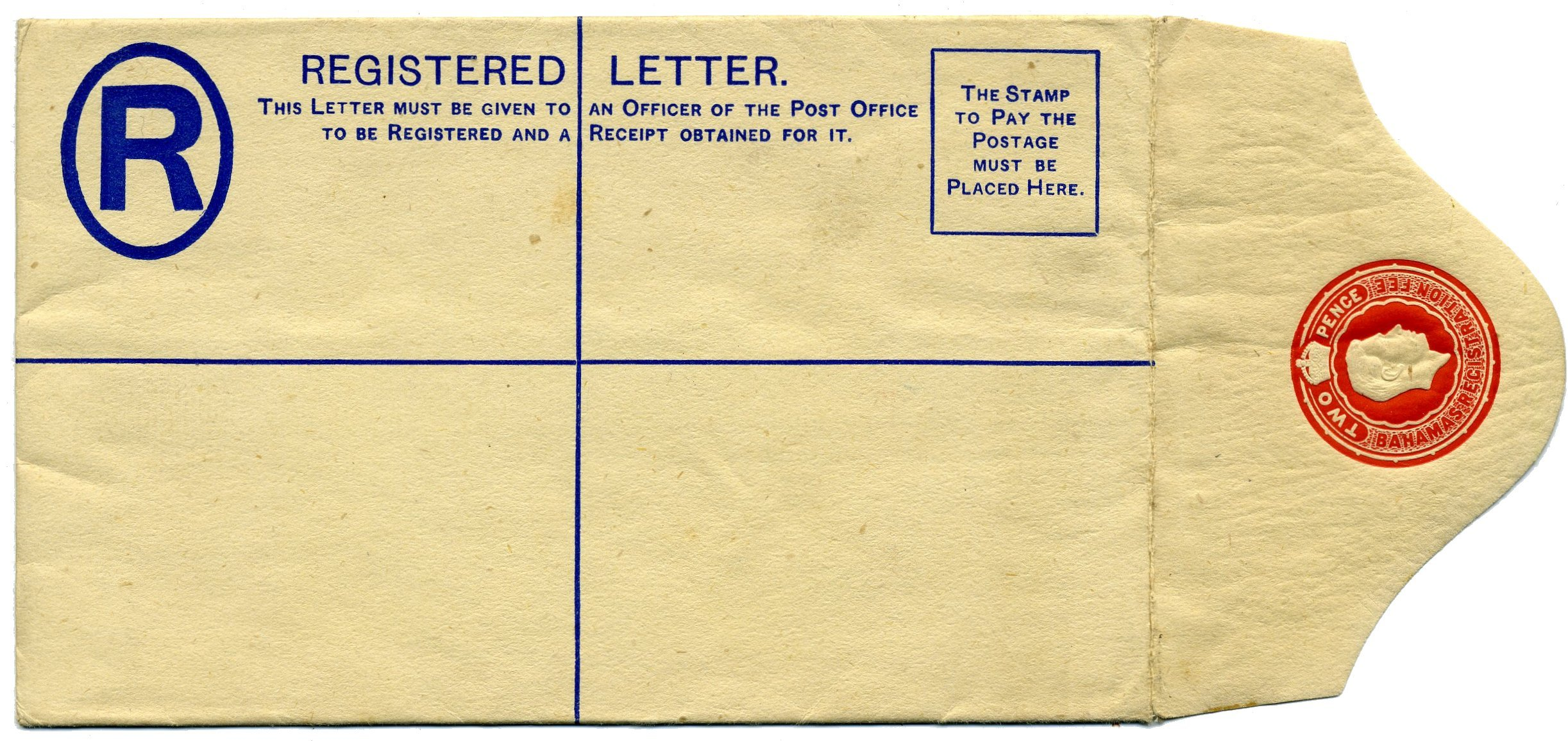
1938 registered envelope from the Bahamas. Although the indicium includes only the registration fee and there is no prepayment of postage, it is regarded as postal stationery and not formular stationery as the registration fee is a fee for a postal service. This and many other envelopes were made from thick paper and lined with glued gauze to make it stiffer and non-transparent.

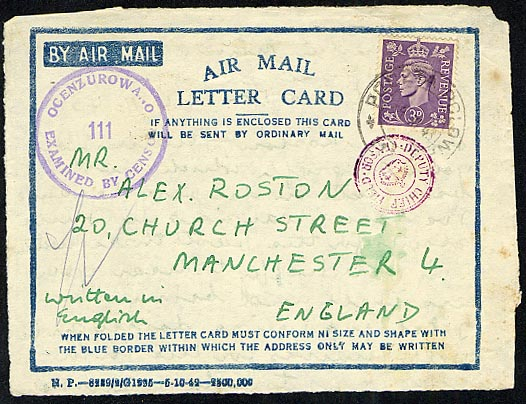
1943 Air Mail Letter Card. The fact that it has an adhesive stamp and no prepayment of postage means that it is formular and not postal stationery.

The term formular (often misspelled formula) is an adjective applied to envelopes, cards and aerograms, etc., produced by postal authorities or to their specification, but bearing no imprinted or embossed stamp or other indication of prepayment of postage.

Formular stationery requires an adhesive stamp before posting. Because they lack an indication of prepayment of postage or other related service, they do not technically meet the definition of "postal stationery", but the due to the similarities they are sometimes included in postal stationery collections.

Countries including New Zealand, Zimbabwe and Ireland have printed unstamped aerograms.
