= Mulready stationery =

19th-century postal stationery

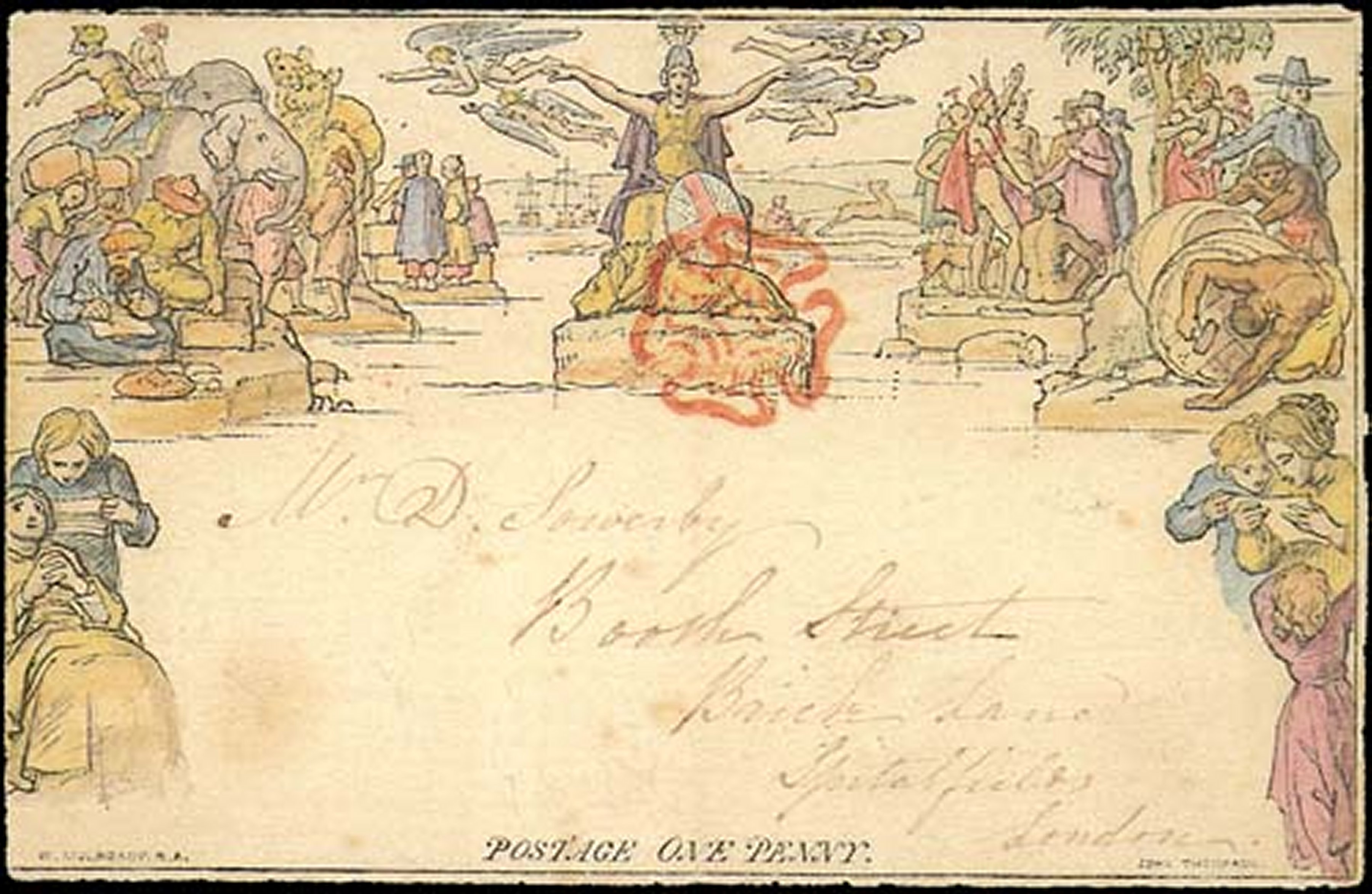
The one penny Mulready stationery issued in 1840, hand coloured

Mulready stationery describes the postal stationery letter sheets and envelopes that were introduced as part of the British Post Office postal reforms of 1840. They went on sale on 1 May 1840, and were valid for use from 6 May. The Mulready name arises from the fact that William Mulready, a well-known artist of the time, was commissioned to illustrate the part of the letter sheets and envelopes which corresponded with the face area.

== Design ==
The design incorporated a munificent Britannia at the centre top with a shield and a reclining lion surrounded on either side by a representation of the continents of Asia and North America with people reading their mail in the two lower corners, bestowing the benefits of mail services to the countries of the world under British control. The Mulready illustration, engraved by John Thompson, was printed such that it appeared on the face of the sheets when folded. The Mulready letter sheets followed the traditional letter sheet design and could be folded as normal while the envelopes were a diamond-shaped sheet which, when the sides were folded to the center, became an envelope and the overlapping edges were then sealed.

The Mulready illustration was effectively a very elaborate frank indicating that postage had been pre-paid. In the same way that the first postage stamps were issued in two values (Penny Black and Two Penny Blue) both the letter sheets and envelopes were issued in sheets of twelve, called Formes. The one penny and two penny values were in the same black and blue colours as the same value postage stamps.

The design was to write on the inside or to enclose a letter written on ordinary paper. The Mulready letter sheet was fundamentally akin to the present-day aerogram.

Pre-gummed envelopes as we know them today did not exist. The diamond-shaped sheet and the geometrically more complex short-arm cross-shaped sheet remain essentially the staple designs to this day. (All mechanical printing devices from the Gutenberg press on are primarily designed to process flat rectangular sheets. Hence the illustration would have been printed using a press and then cut to a diamond shape. The number produced from any one sheet naturally depended on the size of the printing bed and to this day envelope printing and envelope manufacture have maintained a symbiotic relationship.)

== Demise ==
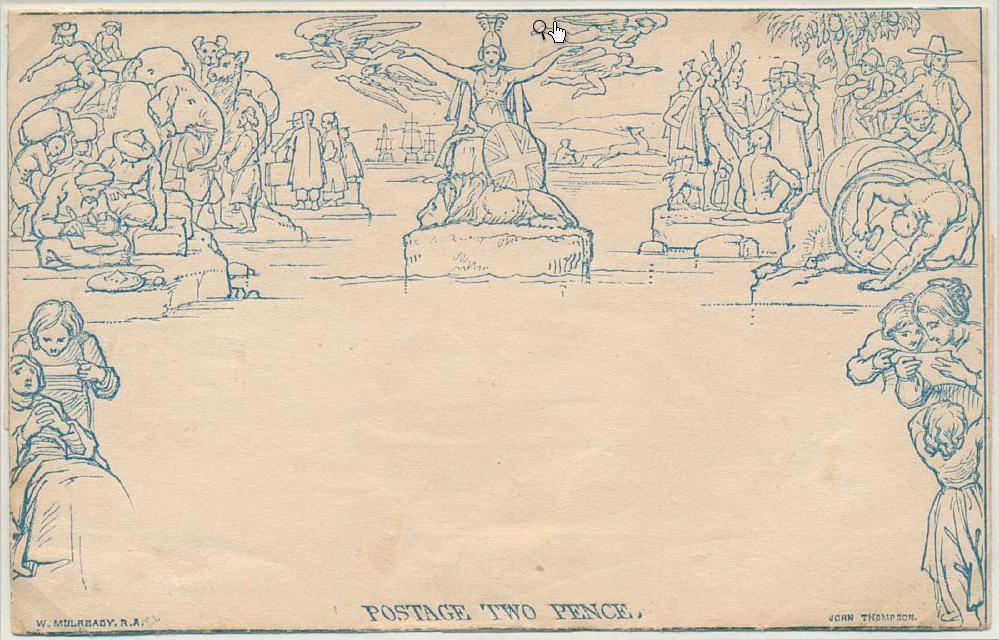
The 2 pence Mulready stationery issued in 1840

Rowland Hill expected the Mulready stationery to be more popular than the postage stamps but the postage stamp prevailed. The design was so elaborate and misunderstood that it generated widespread ridicule and lampooning, and in addition was perceived in some areas as a covert government attempt to control the supply of envelopes, and hence control the flow of information carried by the postal service (which had become a government monopoly under the reforms). Many caricatures (or lampoons) were produced by stationers whose livelihood was threatened by the new letter sheet. Only six days after their introduction, on 12 May, Hill wrote in his journal: "I fear we shall have to substitute some other stamp for that design by Mulready ... the public have shown their disregard and even distaste for beauty."

Within two months a decision had been made to replace the Mulready designed stationery and essentially they were a folly. As a result of the uproar the Mulreadys were replaced with a simple design which is commonly known as the Penny Pink. The Penny Pinks were issued on 10 February 1841. Contrary to often published accounts, the Mulreadys were not withdrawn at that time. Supplies in post offices were eventually exhausted. Large supplies remained in the hands of stamp distributors and sub-distributors. In November 1842, the Inland Revenue decided that those stocks should be withdrawn. The withdrawal notice was sent gradually over a period of time so that the store keepers at Inland Revenue would not be overwhelmed with the volume of returned Mulreadys. The withdrawal period lasted several years. The returned Mulreadys were stored at a warehouse until it was decided to destroy them. The first attempt was to burn them, using close stoves out of fear of robbery, but this failed. Eventually a machine was designed and built to destroy them by punching out the center of the design.
