= Lettercard =

Postal stationery item

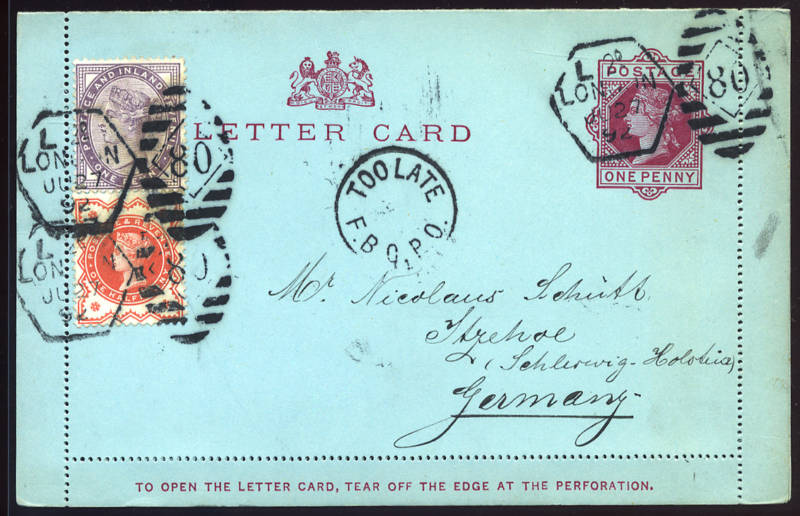
1892 imprinted 1d letter card uprated with 1d and 1/2d postage stamps sent from London to Germany, complete with selvages

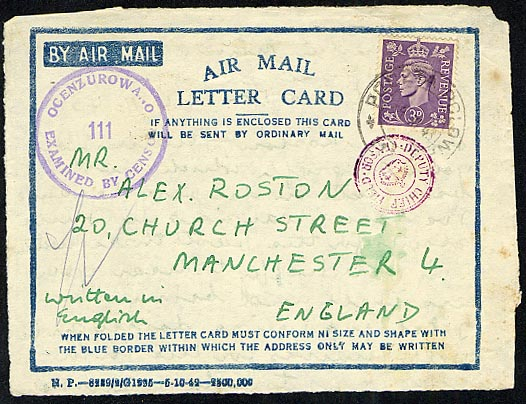
1943 use of an early aerogramme inscribed Air Mail Letter Card. The adhesive stamp, rather than a prepaid imprinted stamp or indicium, means that it is not postal stationery but instead a formular air letter card.

In philately, a lettercard or letter card is a postal stationery item consisting of a folded card with a prepaid imprinted stamp. The message is written on the inside and the card is then folded and sealed around the edges. The recipient tears off and discards the perforated selvages to open the card. The fact that it is folded in half before it is sent means there is twice as much space for the message compared with a postal card of the same final size.

The lettercard was first conceived by a Hungarian named Akin Karoly and introduced in Belgium in 1882. Private issues were used in Great Britain in 1887. The first official British letter card was issued in 1892. In Newfoundland, reply lettercards, which included a small reply card, were introduced in 1912.

Letter cards were issued in a variety of card stock and colour.

The terms letter card and air mail letter card were sometimes used on aerogrammes prior to 1952, the year that the U.P.U. official recognized the word aerogramme.

== See also ==
- Aerogram
- Letter sheet
- Postcard
