= Letter sheet =

Postal stationery product

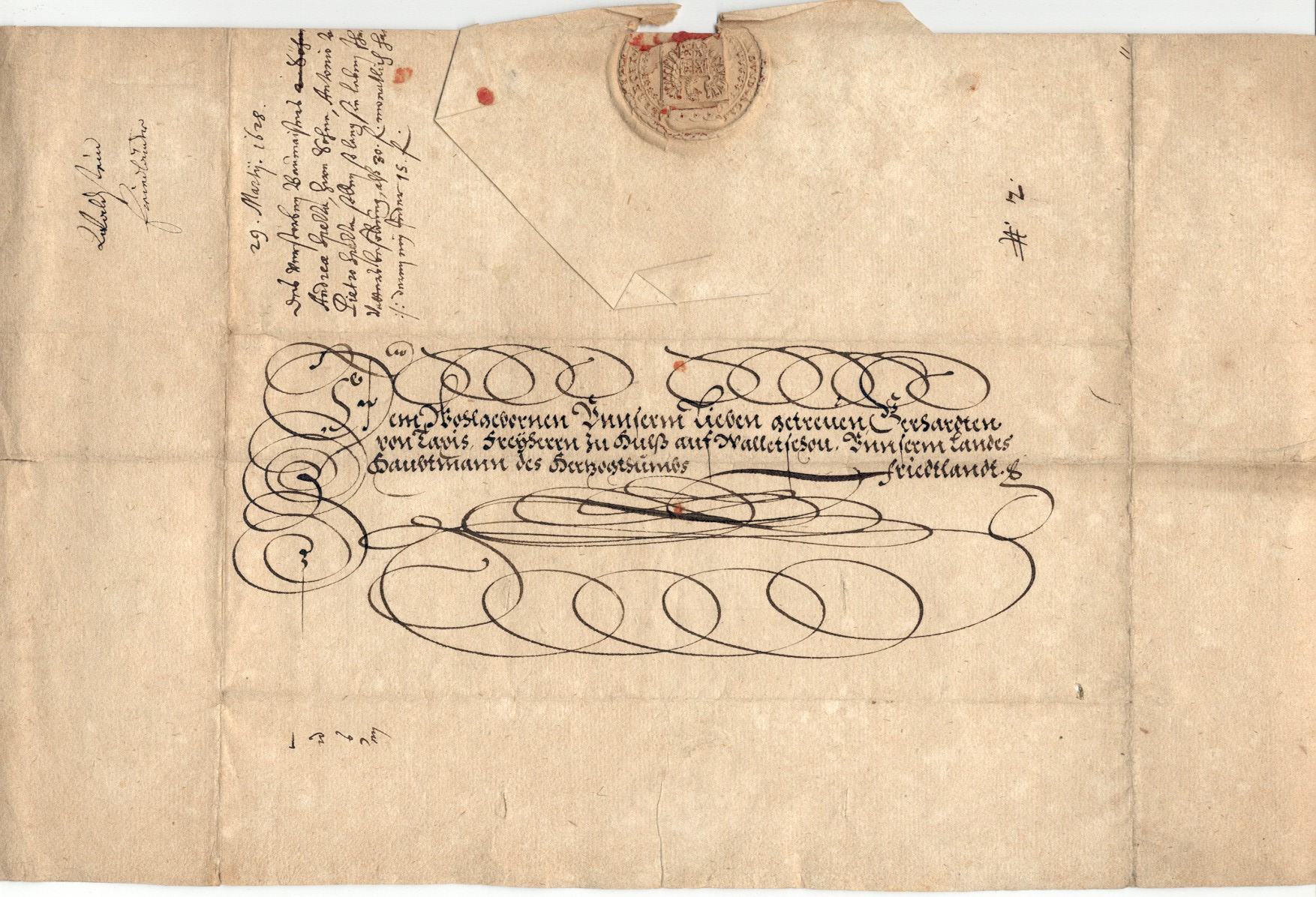
Opened up 1628 lettersheet showing folds, address and seal, with letter being written on the obverse

In philatelic terminology a letter sheet, often written lettersheet, is a sheet of paper that can be folded, usually sealed (most often with sealing wax in the 18th and 19th centuries), and mailed without the use of an envelope, or it can also be a similar item of postal stationery issued by a postal authority. Letter sheets derive from the form in which written correspondence was made up before the mid-19th century—letters were written on one or more sheets of paper that were folded and sealed in such a way that the address could be written on the outside.

The term lettersheet has been used to describe the unstamped folded sheet letters used before envelopes became popular. Recent academic research and conservation initiatives have termed such folded and sealed letters as "letterpackets”; however, only a relatively small number of early examples, such as the Brienne Collection (1689–1706) at The Hague, are known to exist. Envelopes were not used much before the second half of the 19th century, because most countries' postal rates calculated for the extra sheet of paper that made up the envelope, thereby increasing the cost of mailing when an envelope was used.

Pre-paid lettersheets issued by postal operators are postal stationery because they bear imprinted stamps, or indicia that indicate pre-payment, as opposed to adhesive stamps that are only printed by postal authorities. Lettersheets that require stamps to be applied have also been produced by private firms that usually have no authority for a pre-paid indicia, so postage must be paid by normal means at normal postage rates. Most countries' postal authorities have issued true lettersheets at some stage; however, most have discontinued their use, except in the form of an aerogram, due to the popularity of envelopes.

== History ==
The first postal stationery item issued by a government is thought to be the AQ lettersheet issued in 1608 and showing the coat of arms of Venice. In 1790 Luxembourg produced a 25-centime lettersheet. British newspaper publishers printed colourful stamps on paper supplied by the government between 1712–1870 and Australia produced lettersheets two years before the Mulready lettersheets were issued in 1840. During this period envelopes were rarely used. New South Wales issued prepaid lettersheets in 1838 with uninked embossed stamps (making them difficult to see) to prepay postage within the town of Sydney.

=== The British postal reforms of 1840 ===
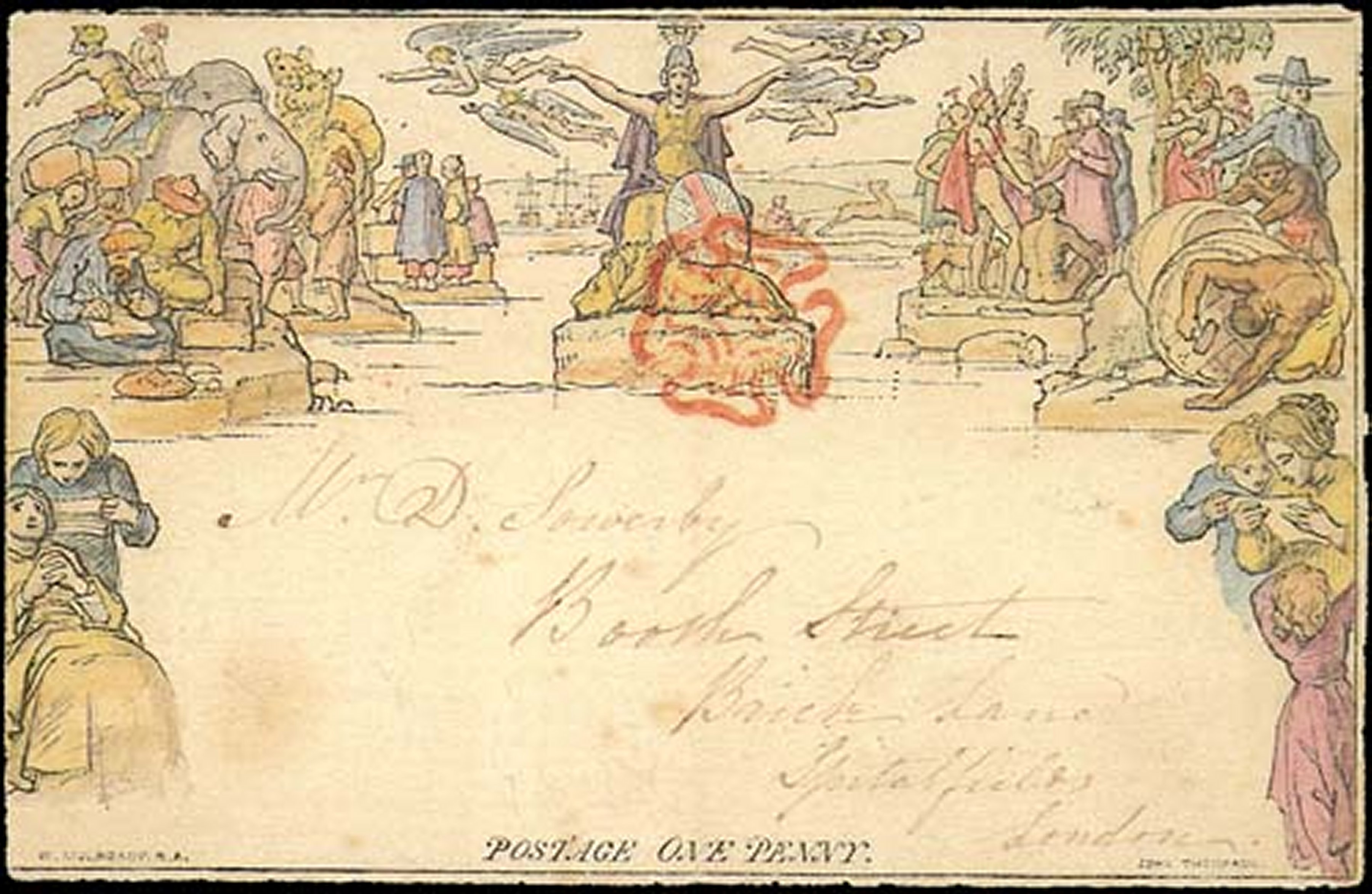
A used 1840 hand-coloured 1d Mulready stationery envelope mailed to London

Prepaid lettersheets were introduced in the United Kingdom of Great Britain and Ireland at the same time as the first postage stamps were available for use on May 6, 1840. Part of Rowland Hill's postal reforms were the introduction of prepaid lettersheets and envelopes designed by the artist William Mulready, whose name is always associated with these first lettersheets and envelopes. In the same way that the first postage stamps were issued in two values (Penny Black and Two Penny Blue) both the lettersheets and envelopes were issued in one penny and two penny values in the same black and blue colours as the same value postage stamps.

The design incorporated Britannia at the centre top with a shield and a reclining lion surrounded on either side by a representation of the continents of Asia and North America with people reading their mail in the two lower corners. Rowland Hill expected the lettersheets to be more popular than the postage stamps but the postage stamp prevailed. Many caricatures were produced by stationery manufacturers whose livelihood was threatened by the new lettersheet. Only six days after their introduction, on May 12, Hill wrote in his journal:

I fear we shall have to substitute some other stamp for that design by Mulready ... the public have shown their disregard and even distaste for beauty.

Within two months a decision had been made to replace the Mulready designed stationery and essentially they were a folly.

=== 19th century United States ===
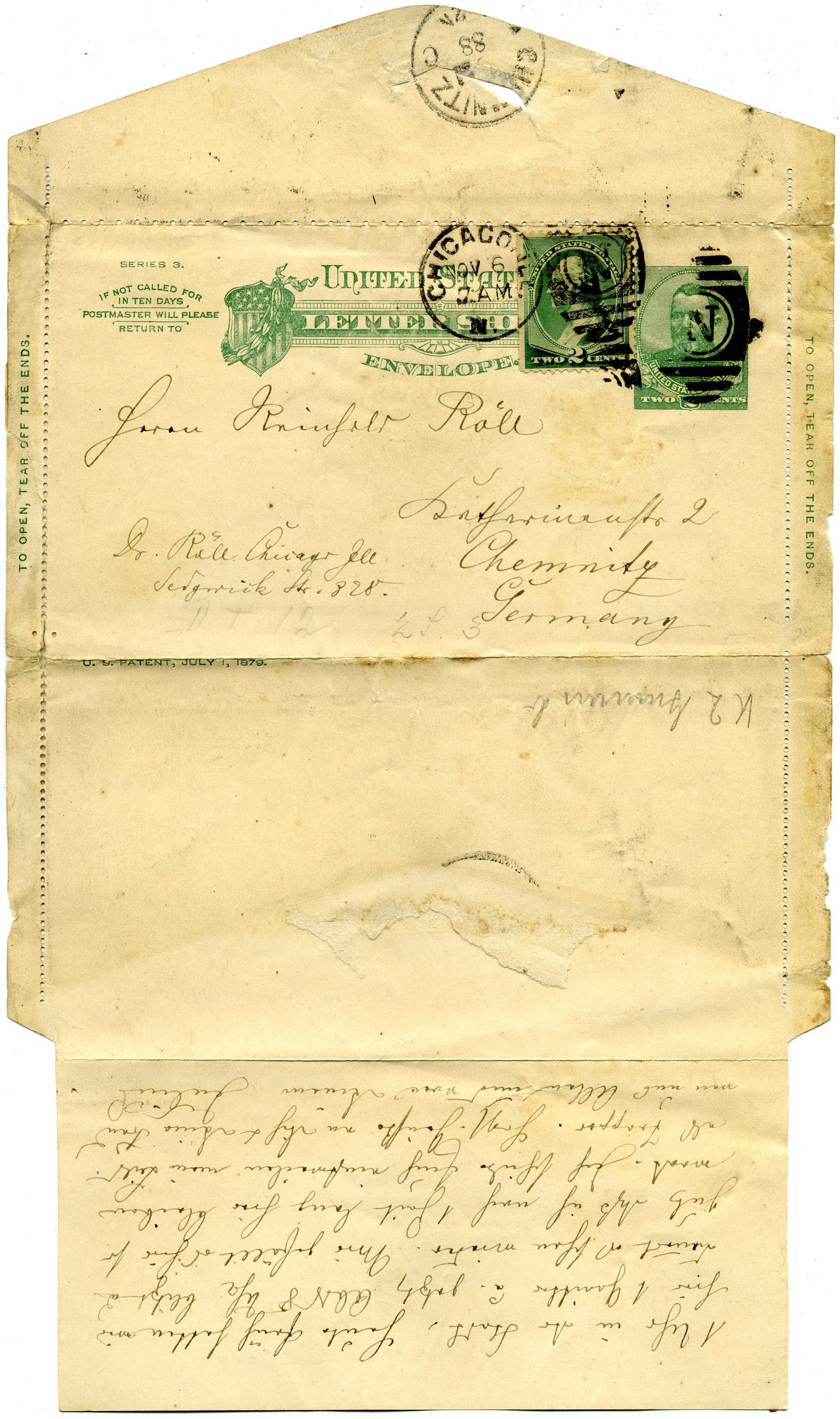
An 1886 2¢ Grant letter sheet uprated by 2¢ and used to Germany, 1888. The letter and flaps were folded for mailing. (Side flaps are still present as they were not torn off upon opening.)

During the American Civil War, in August 1861, two different size lettersheets were issued by the United States which both had the same three cents imprinted stamp design. The small pink indicium on light blue note lettersheet (205 x 296 mm) was for ladies correspondence and the larger size (256 x 405 mm) was designed for soldiers, ostensibly as a convenient writing paper without the added burden of securing stamps. The suggested use, though practical, did not materialize and they were withdrawn from sales in April 1864.

Despite the abortive attempt to popularize lettersheets in 1861, two-cent lettersheets with a picture of President Ulysses Grant were issued on August 18, 1886. They were last produced in 1894, but slow sales of lettersheets continued until 1902. The US has not produced any since, other than air letter sheets or aerograms which became available in 1947 and were likewise discontinued in 2006.

Privately produced pictorial lettersheets were published by several stationers in New York City and other cities. These lettersheets, predominantly showing bird's-eye views and street scenes, were created to comply with, yet circumvent, postal regulations that, like the United Kingdom's, were based on the number of sheets of paper. These lettersheets were popular because of their 8.5 × 21 inch size that could be folded in half, providing four pages for writing but the Post Office regarded them as one sheet of paper.

=== Air Letter Cards ===
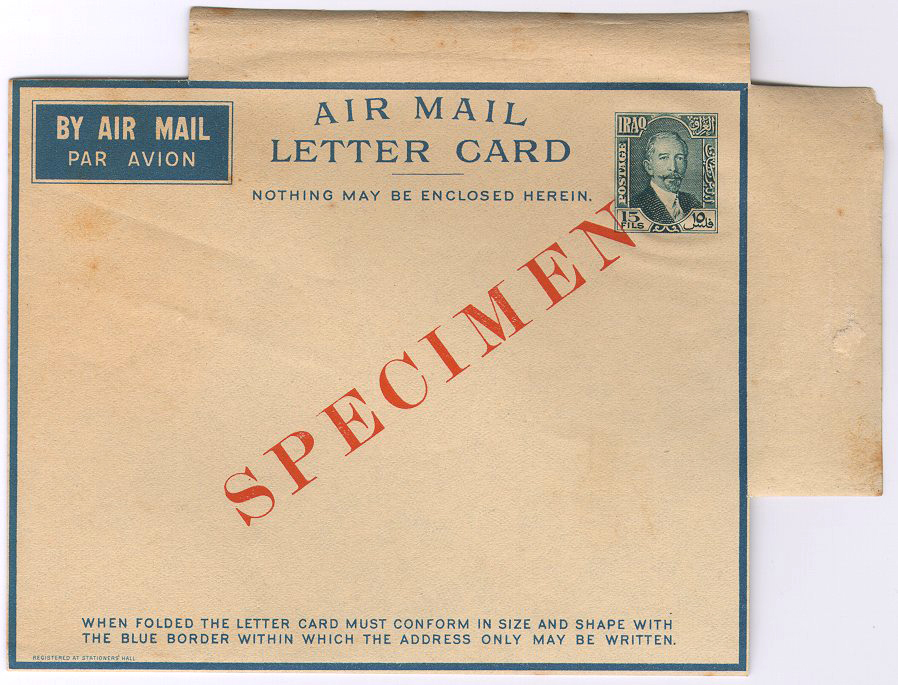
Iraq airmail letter card issued in 1933

Special stationery on thin sheets of paper, called Air Letter Cards, were available in Iraq as early as 1933. The sheets were folded to the size of the blue border, and gummed flaps were used to seal the sheet. Douglas Gumbley, director of Posts to the Iraq Government in the 1930s, realised there was a need for a lightweight form for use in the developing air services in, and through, the Middle East because regular overland mail was charged by weight and varied in size and seemed likely to be too expensive for airmail service. He personally copyrighted the product in February 1933 and it was used first in Iraq and later in the British Mandate of Palestine where Gumbley was in charge of postal matters in the late 1930s.

=== World War II lettersheets ===
In early 1941 the United Kingdom introduced thin, lightweight forms intended for use by their overseas military forces. Known as air letter sheets, they took up much less space than regular letters, and by August the use of these sheets was extended to civilians. Allied POW communications through the Red Cross used a special lettersheet inscribed Prisoner of War Air Mail in English and German or Japanese with a 2½d indicia. The Forces air lettersheets were rated at 3d while the civilian version was imprinted with a 6d stamp.

Several other countries adapted the British lettersheet model during the war, while many other countries introduced them after the war. Curiously, the British 6d air letter rate remained in effect until 1966 while other postal rates increased.

Some German POW and concentration camps issued their own special lettersheets for use by the inmates. Towards the end of WWII, at least eight forged German Feldpost lettersheets were printed by the OSS Operation Cornflakes to undermine Axis morale during late 1944 and 1945.

=== Modern lettersheets ===
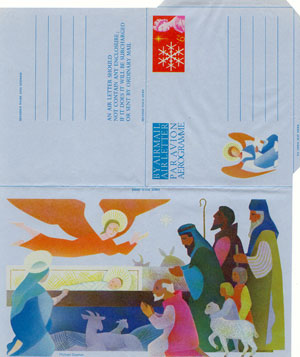
Pictorial GB 6d Christmas aerogram with pre-paid indicia

The aerogram, also written aérogramme, aerogramme, or airletter, also made from a lightweight paper, is the modern equivalent of the WWII lettersheet and most postal operators issue them prepaid, though Ireland, New Zealand and Rhodesia have issued them without an indicium requiring the addition of a postage stamp before mailing.

The Universal Postal Union adopted the term aérogramme, the French word for air letter, during the 1951–52 13th Postal Union Congress held in Brussels and all countries inscribe this on their air mail lettersheets except for the United Kingdom which still uses the term Air Letter.

Not all lettersheets are aerograms, however. Cuba, for instance, has issued a number of colorful lettersheets that were designed for internal, non-airmail, use in Cuba.

== See also ==
- Aerogram
- Lettercard
- Letterlocking
