= Postal card =

Postal stationery

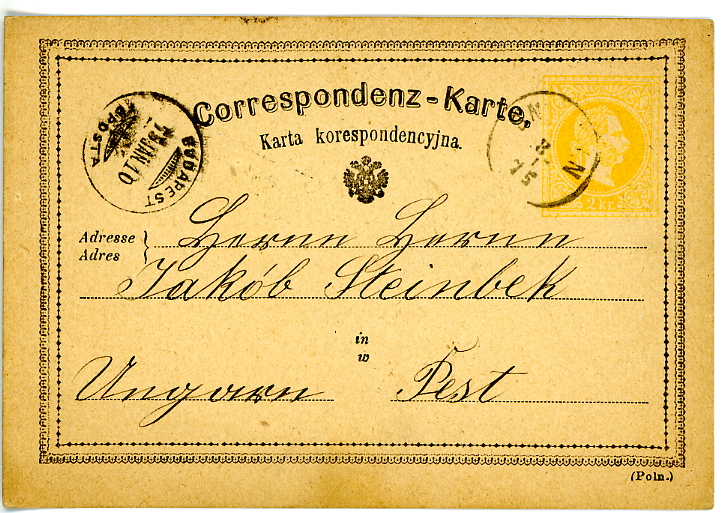
Austria-Hungary postal card of 1875, Polish version, sent from Sniatyn (Ukraine).

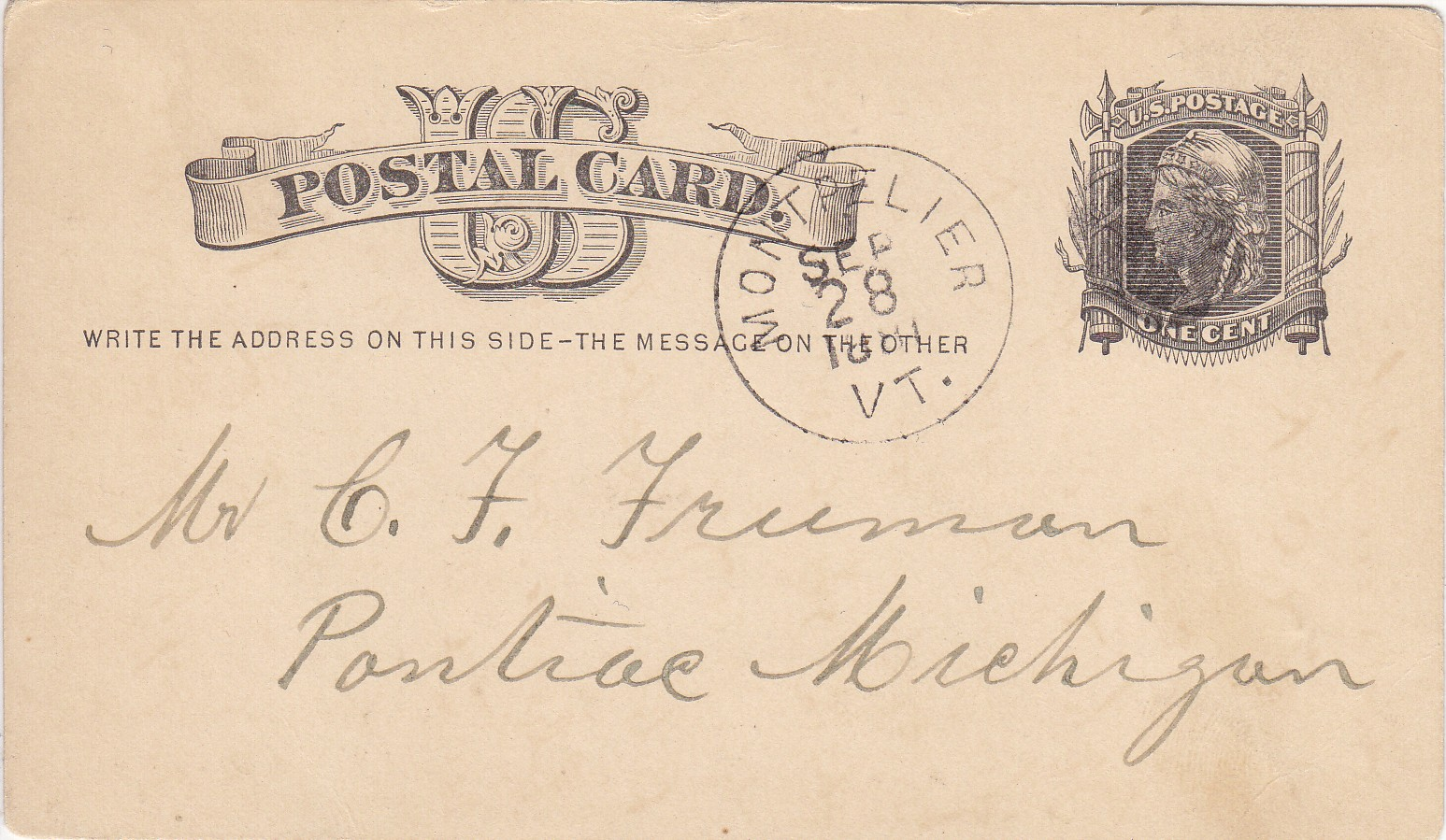
United States postal card of 1881.

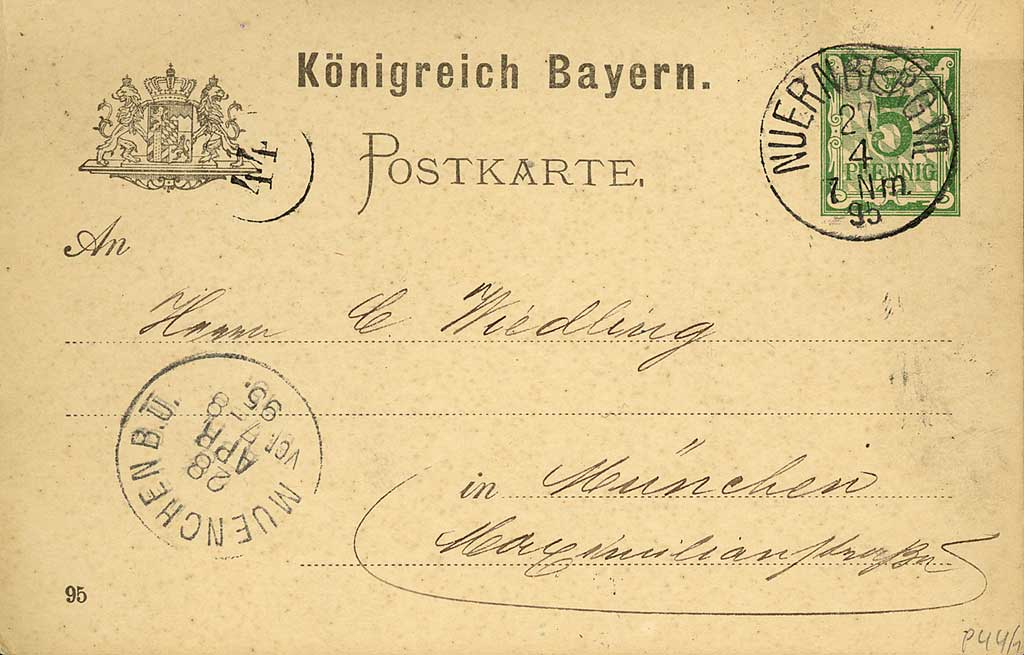
Bavarian postal card of 1892.

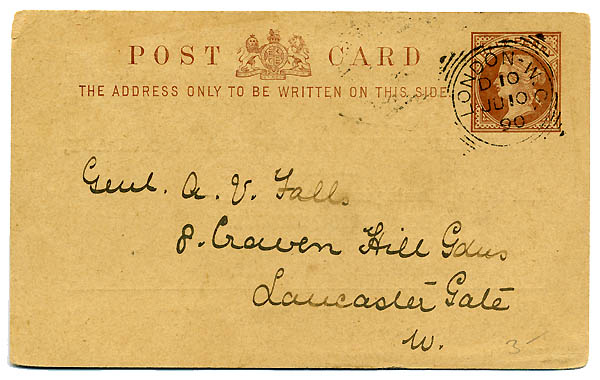
United Kingdom postal card of 1895.

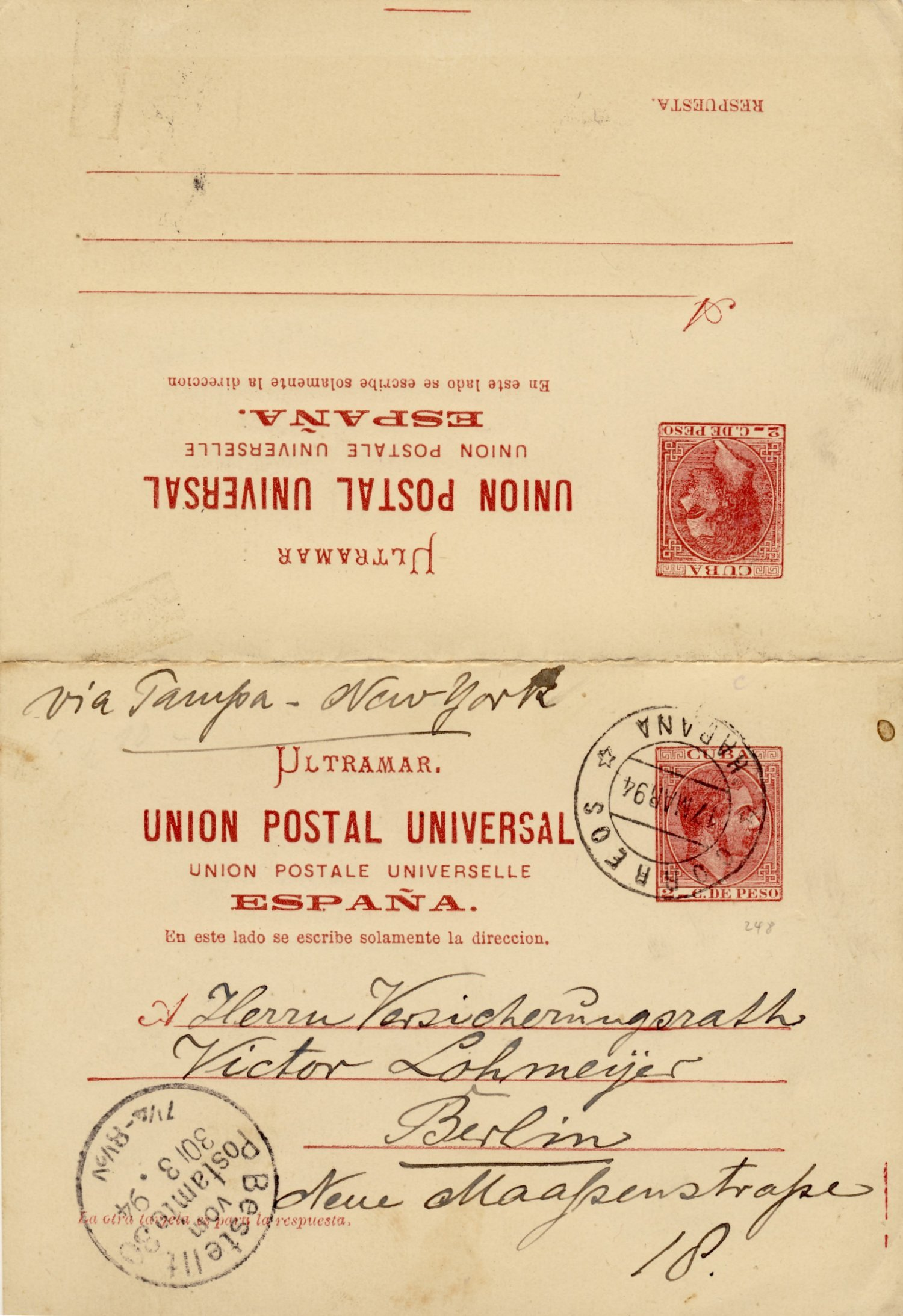
A message reply card, still attached, sent from Cuba to Germany, 1894.

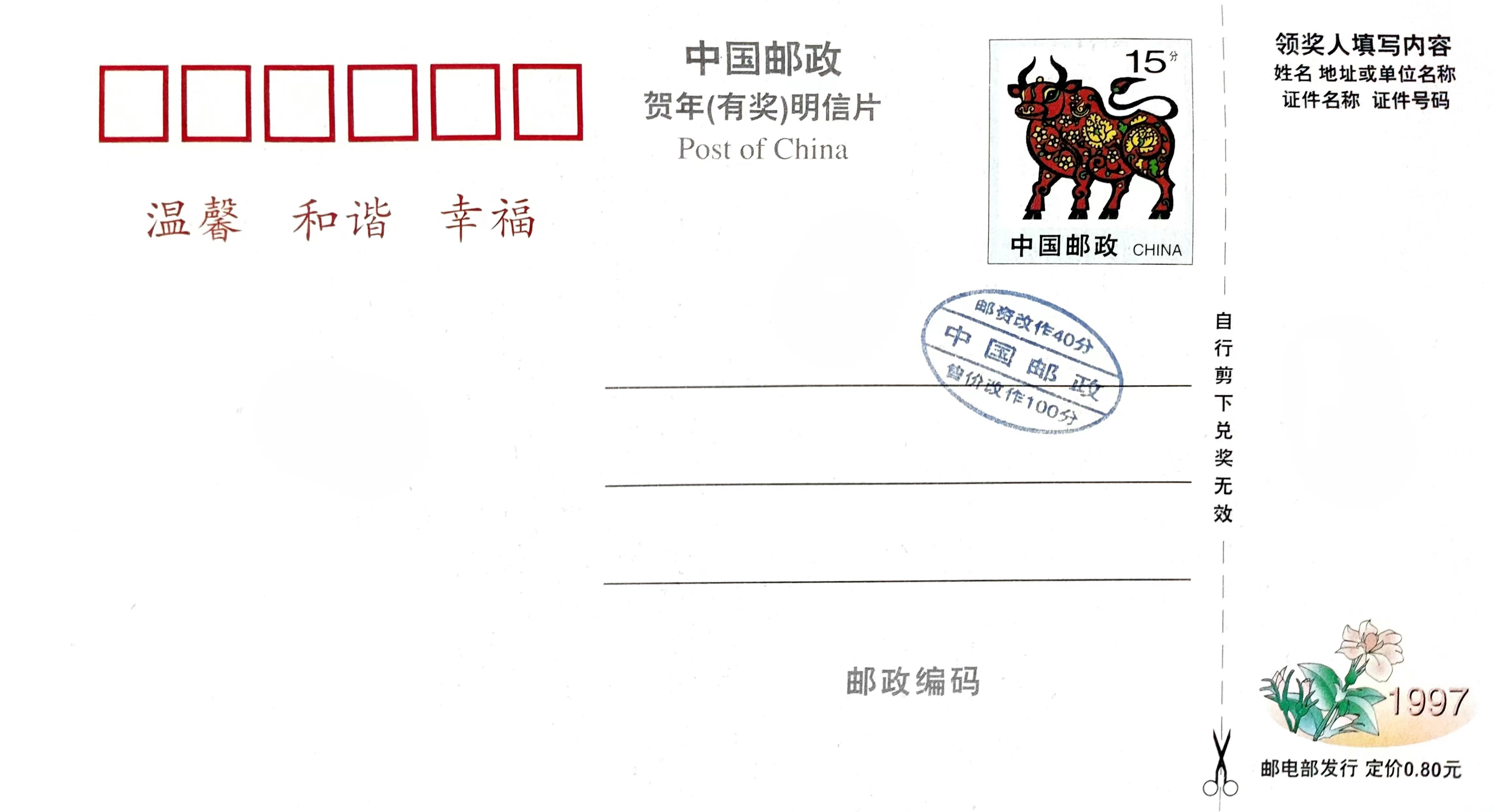
A Chinese zodiac "Year of the ox" postal card with an overprinted surcharged imprinted stamp, 1997

Postal cards are postal stationery with an imprinted stamp or indicium signifying the prepayment of postage. They are sold by postal authorities. On January 26, 1869, Dr. Emanuel Herrmann of Austria described the advantages of a Correspondenz Karte. By October 1, 1869 the world's first postal card was produced by Austria-Hungary. They caught on quickly. By the end of 1870, Great Britain, Finland, Switzerland and Württemberg joined the countries issuing postal cards. In the United States, they were first produced in 1873. Some of the forms taken by postal cards include the regular single card which may be commemorative or definitive, attached message-reply cards, airmail postal cards, and official postal cards used for official government business with a "penalty for private use".

To the post office, there were positive advantages to postal cards as opposed to correspondence in envelopes. The cards were lighter and less bulky than letters and they were all the same size. The result was that they occupied less than one third of the space required by the same number of letters. To the public there were also advantages. They were simple and cheap making them an instant success. Britain had a half-penny rate to begin with. The U.S. "penny postcard" rate lasted through 1951.

Presumably for the purpose of getting a prompt reply, a sender was given the opportunity to pay for postage both ways with an attached message-reply card, first introduced by Germany in 1873. Other European countries quickly followed suit. Spain furnished message-reply cards to her Colonies: Cuba (1880), Philippines (1889) and Puerto Rico (1898). The U.S. issued them first in 1892. Message-reply cards were attached tête-bêche and likely to be perforated or rouletted to facilitate separation once in the hands of the recipient. The recipient could then tear them apart and use the prepaid reply card to correspond with the original sender. Normally the message card would be identical to the reply card except with the distinction of having additional language such as "WITH REPLY CARD" or "La otra tarjeta es para la respuesta" or "Carte Postale Réponse" or similar words to distinguish the two. In the U.S., message and reply cards have been identical since 1968.

Nowadays the term "postal card" is clearly differentiated from the term "postcard", which designates cards prepared by private companies and which do not have prepaid franking. (Postcards are readily available at commercial outlets, the addition of an adhesive stamp is required to mail them and they are frequently illustrated with pictures or printed advertisements; they are not considered postal stationery any more than a plain envelope or sheet of parcel wrapping are.) Historically, however, this terminological distinction was not evident: in the UK the term 'post card' was used for what was called in the US a 'postal card'.
