= Postal stationery =

Stationery item with imprinted stamp

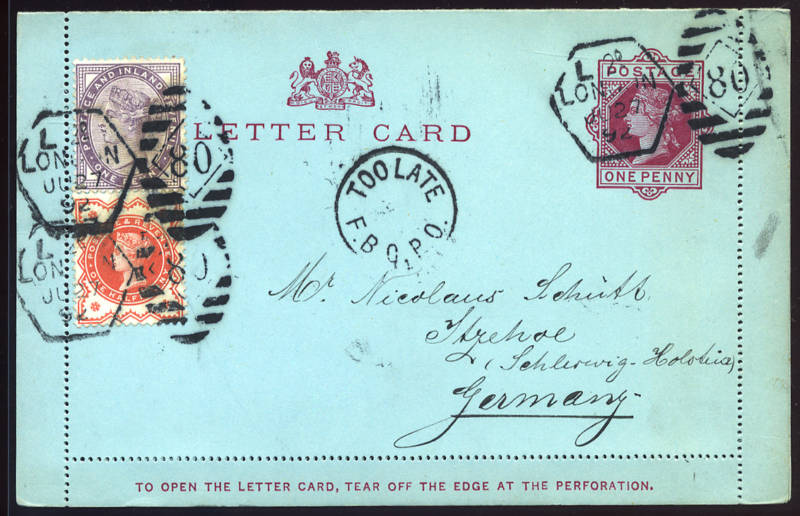
UK letter card of 1892 with an imprinted stamp and perforations.

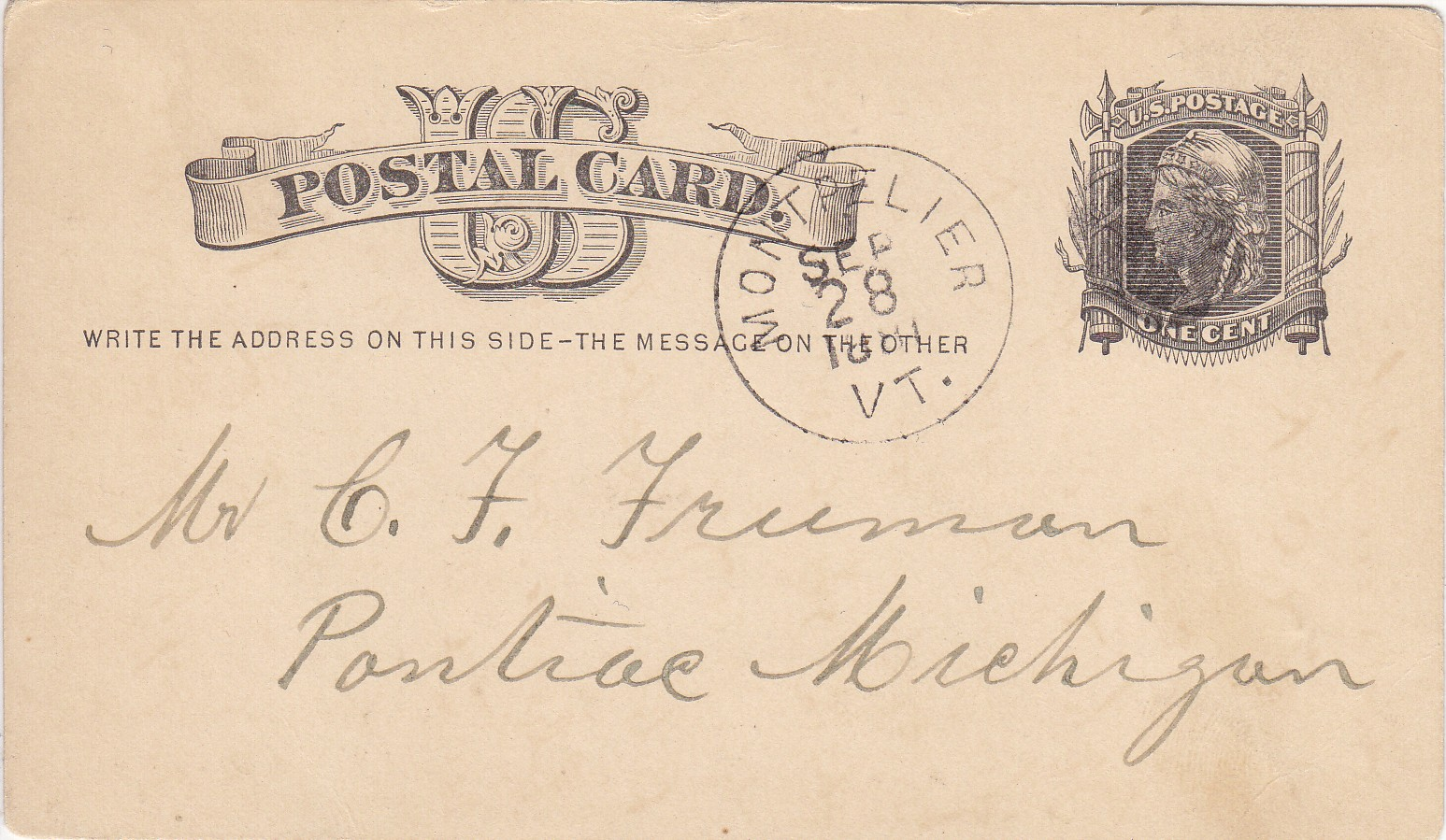
U.S. postal card of 1881 with an imprinted stamp.

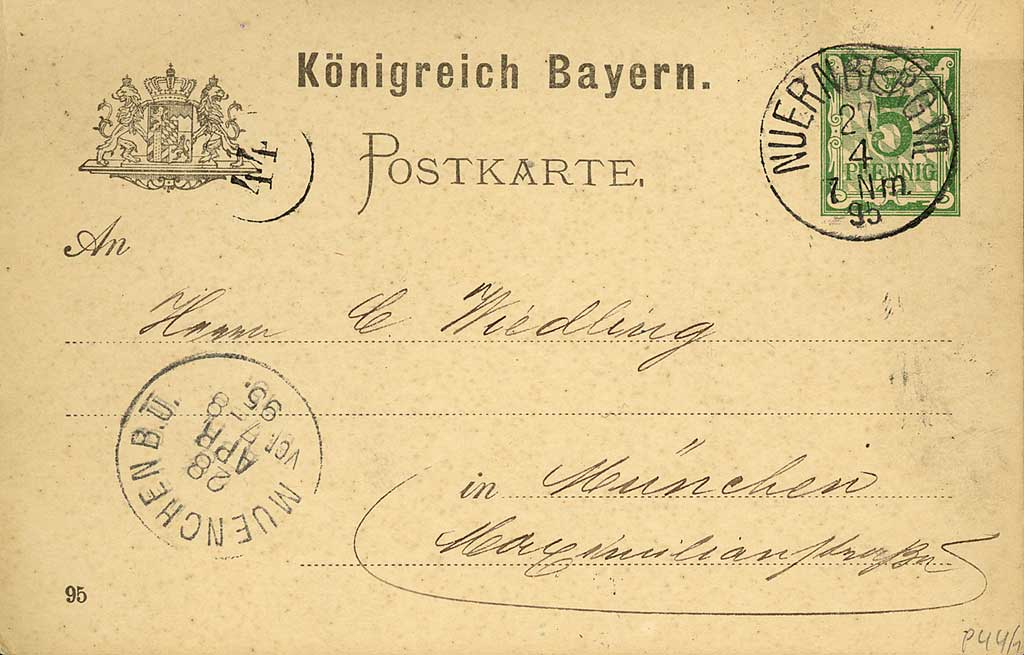
A Bavarian postal card of 1895 with an imprinted stamp.

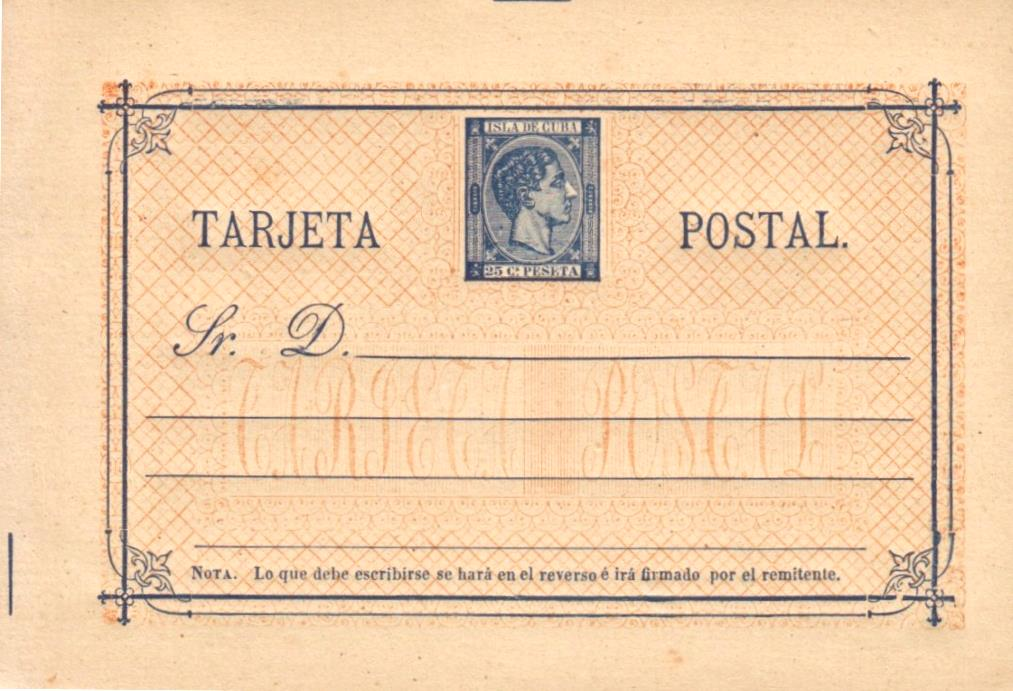
Cuban postal card of 1878.

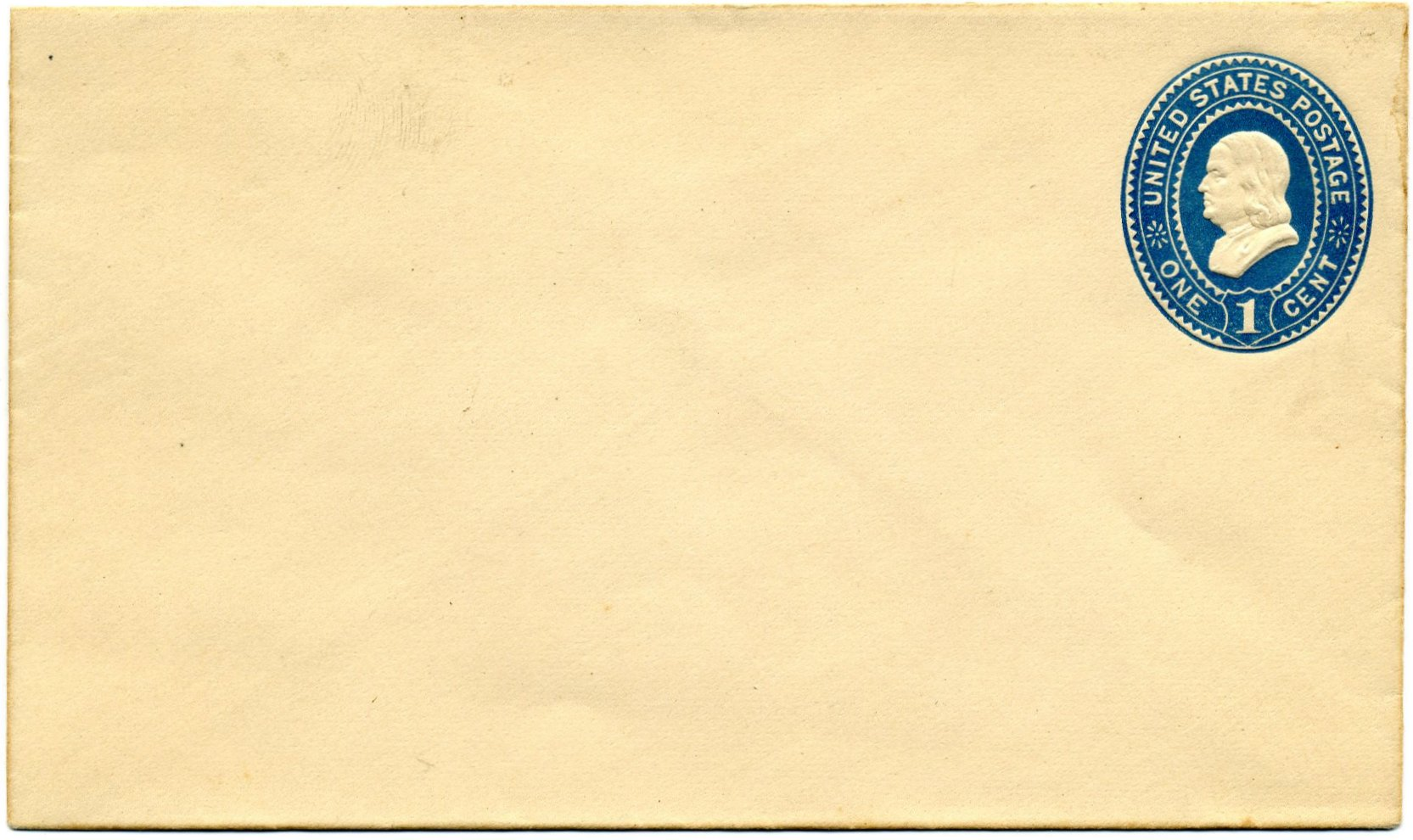
A United States stamped envelope of 1876.

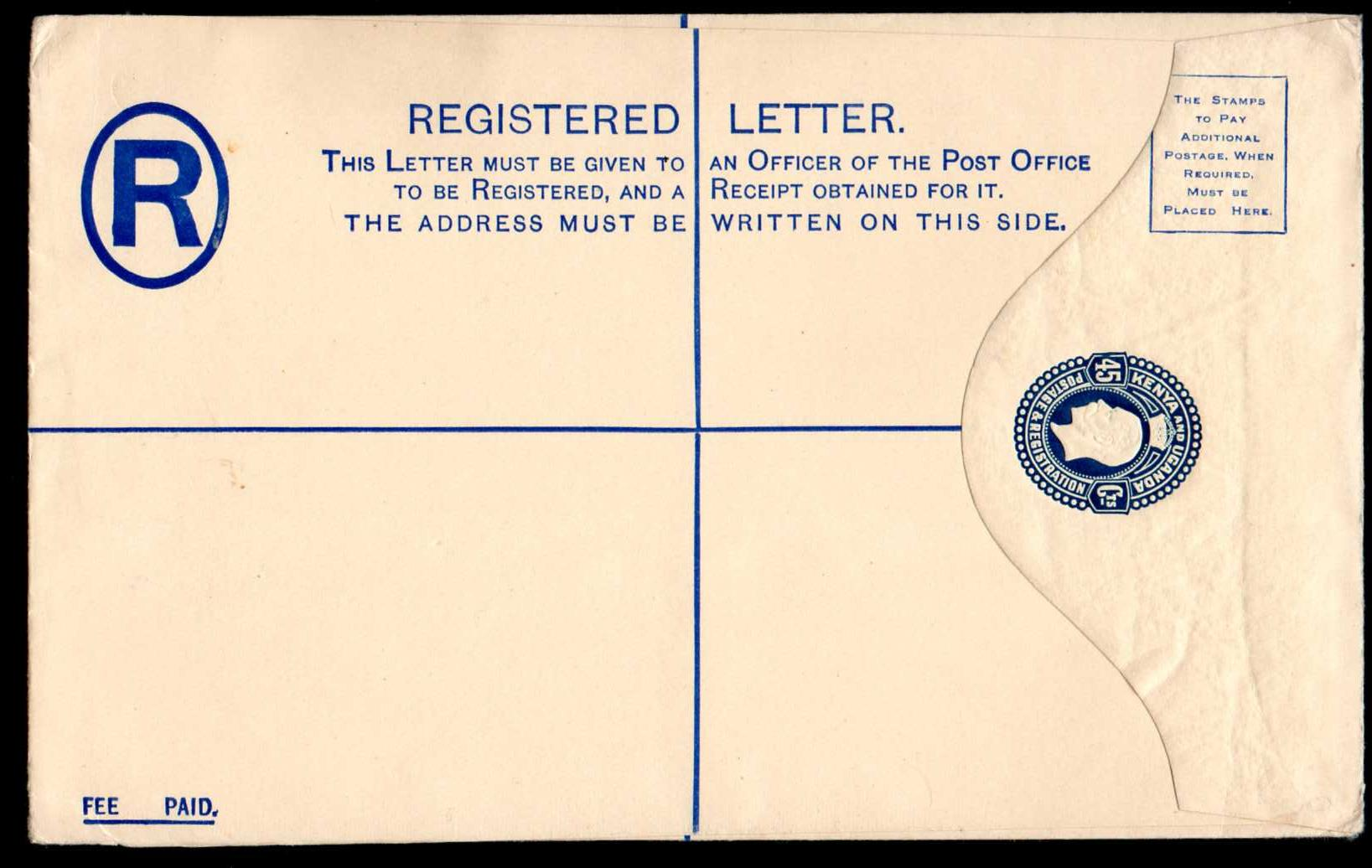
A registered envelope for Kenya and Uganda from 1930.

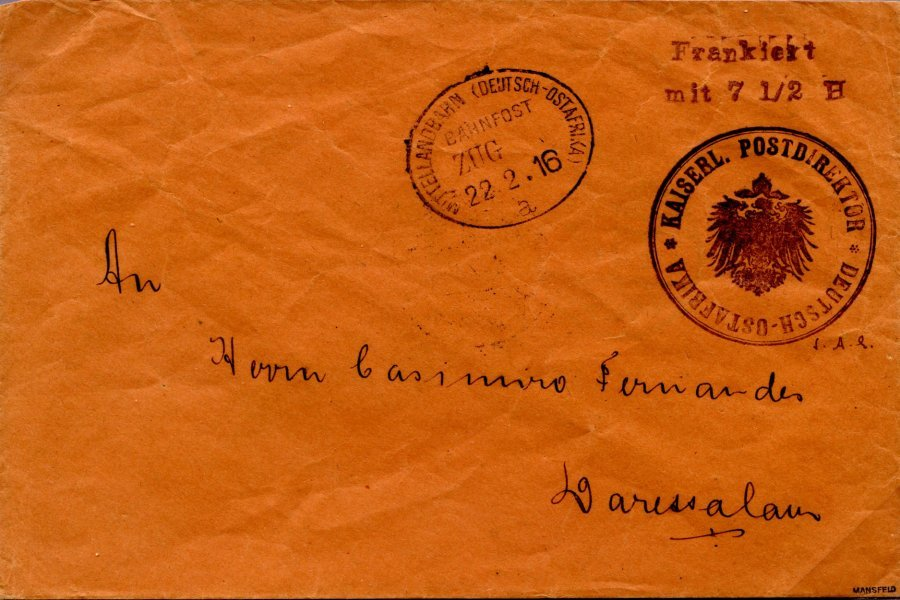
A scarcity of postage stamps during WWI in German East Africa was the cause for this handstamped envelope. Any indication that postage is prepaid (see top right handstamp) is what makes the item postal stationery. The fact that this indicium was applied to an envelope makes this a stamped envelope.

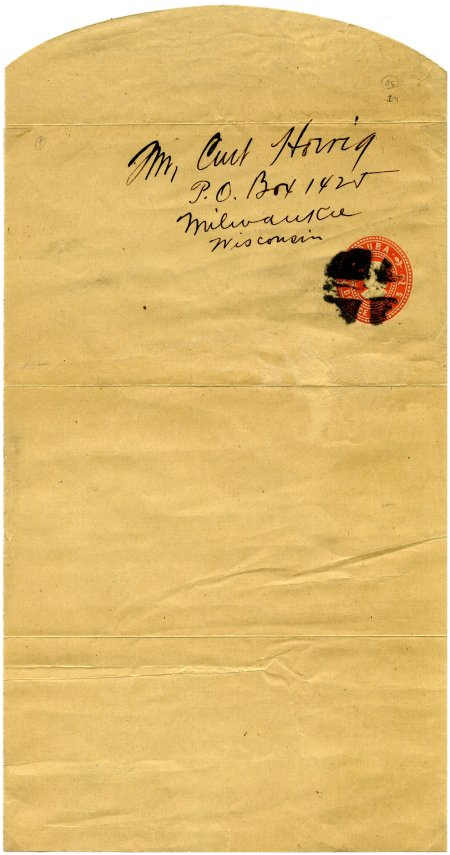
Wrapper printed in US for occupied Cuba, 1899.

A piece of postal stationery is a stationery item, such as a stamped envelope, letter sheet, postal card, lettercard, aerogram or wrapper, with an imprinted stamp or inscription indicating that a specific rate of postage or related service has been prepaid. It does not, however, include any postcard without a pre-printed stamp, and it is different from freepost for preprinted cards issued by businesses. In general, postal stationery is handled similarly to postage stamps; sold from post offices either at the face value of the printed postage or, more likely, with a surcharge to cover the additional cost of the stationery. It can take the form of an official mail issue produced only for the use of government departments.

== History ==
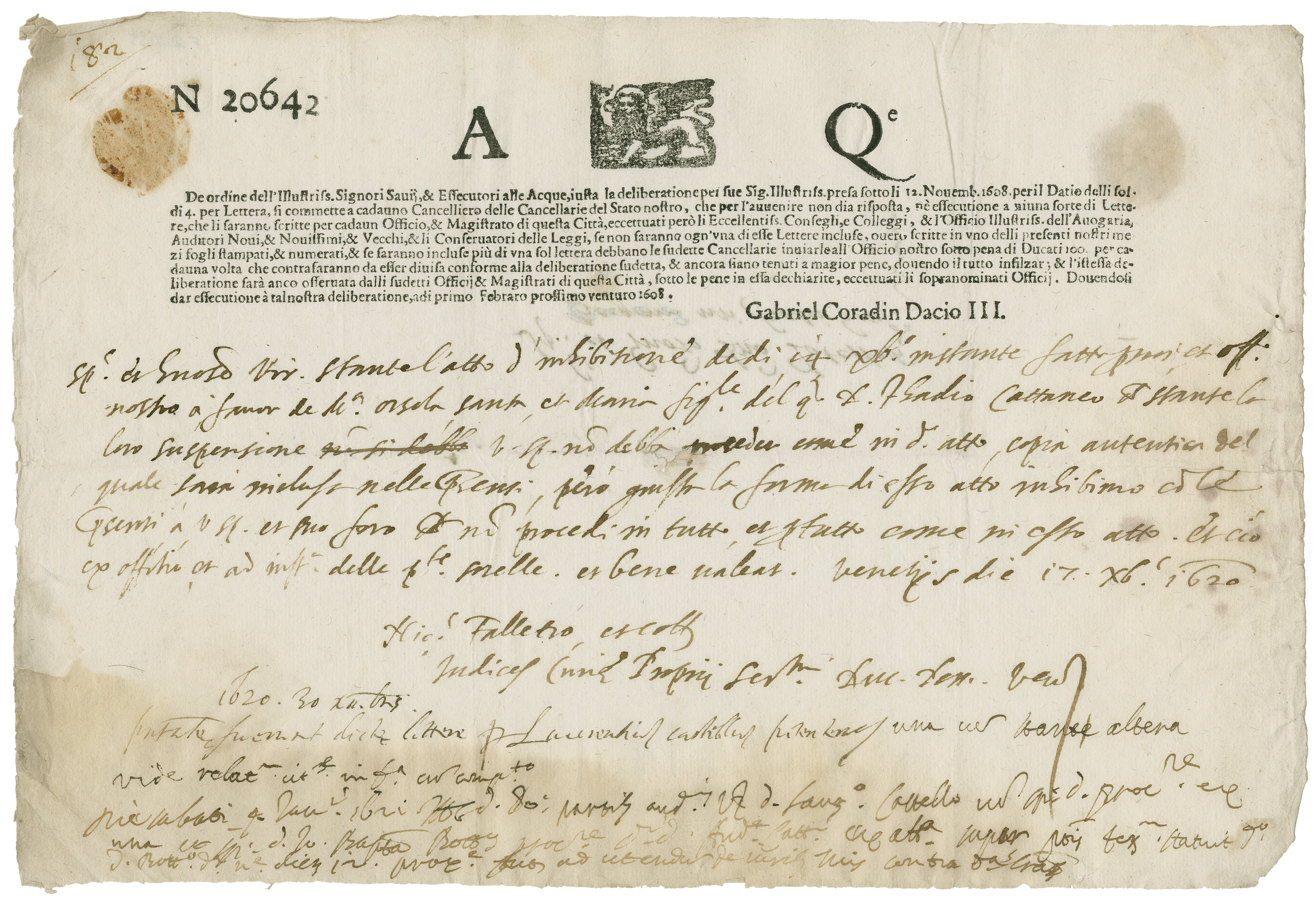
1620 Venetian prepaid letter sheet.

Postal stationery has been in use since at least 1608 with folded letters bearing the coat of arms Venice. Other early examples include British newspaper stamps that were first issued in 1712, 25-centime letter sheets that were issued in 1790 by the government of Luxembourg, and Australian postal stationery that predated more well known issues like the British Mulready stationery that was introduced in 1840.

The first modern form of postal stationery was the stamped, or postal stationery, envelope created by the United Kingdom in 1840, with embossed stamped envelopes introduced in 1841. Other countries quickly followed suite, including the United States, which released the Nesbitt series of stamped envelopes in 1853. A variation of the stamped envelope, a registered envelope, has been widely used throughout Great Britain and the British Commonwealth. Although none have been issued in the United States due to differences in mail registration procedures. Another form of stamped envelopes are so called wrappers, a form of postal stationery envelope that can be used to prepay the cost of delivery for a newspaper or periodical. Wrappers were first introduced in 1961 by the United States, which was followed by 110 other countries in total. Although all the countries have stopped producing then due to declining sales. With Cyprus being the last country to stop their use in 1991.

The next innovation in postal stationery came in 1869 with the introduction of the postal card in Austria-Hungry. Postal cards are a type of cardstock that contains an imprinted stamp or indicium. They quickly caught on due to being mostly uniform and less bulky then traditional letters. To the point that Great Britain, Finland, Switzerland and Württemberg had all issued postal cards by 1871. Followed by the United States in 1873.

Despite its popularity, the postal card was soon followed by the letter card. A letter card is a postal stationery item consisting of a folded card with a prepaid imprinted stamp. The format was first issued by Belgium in 1882. Great Britain issued their first official letter cards in 1892 and Newfoundland introduced small reply cards starting in 1912. Letter cards had the advantage of providing twice the room for writing a message then postal cards and were more private due to being folded over.. A variation of the letter card called an aerogram was introduced in 1933 by a Lieutenant Colonel while he was doing a tour in the Middle East theatre. Although the format was not officially endorsed by the Universal Postal Union until 1952. An aerogram is a thin, lightweight piece foldable paper that is used for writing letters and sending them via airmail. Although unlike letter cards they can come unstamped and be issued by private companies..

== Collecting ==
Most postal stationery pieces are collected as entires, that is, the whole card, sheet, or envelope. In the 19th century, it was common to collect "cut squares" (or cut-outs in the UK), which involved clipping the embossed or otherwise pre-printed indicia from postal stationery entires. This destroyed the envelope. As a result, one cannot tell from a cut square what specific envelope it came from and, many times, the cancellation information. The manner in which the stamped envelope is cut out (defined by the term "knife") cannot be determined from a cut square. Thus, most collectors prefer entires to cut squares.

Many country-specific stamp catalogs list postal stationery and there are books devoted to the postal stationery of individual countries. The current, but now dated, principal encyclopedic work is the nineteen volume Higgins & Gage World Postal Stationery Catalog.

=== Collectors societies ===
Collectors of postal stationery may seek out postal stationery societies or study groups in other countries. These societies provide information, publications and guidance to those who are interested. They include:

- Australia: The Postal Stationery Society of Australia
- Belgium: Societe Belge de l'Entier Postal
- Canada: British North America Philatelic Society Postal Stationery Study Group
- France: Entiers Postaux Français
- Germany: Berliner Ganzsachen-Sammler-Verein
- Great Britain / UK: Postal Stationery Society of Great Britain, The Postal Stationery Society
- Netherlands: Nederlandse Vereniging van Poststukken
- Switzerland: Swiss Postal Stationery Collectors Society / Schweizerischer Ganzsachen-Sammler-Verein (SGSSV)
- United States: United Postal Stationery Society

== Publications ==
=== Catalogs ===
==== World wide ====
- Higgins & Gage World Postal Stationery Catalog
- Postal stationery: A Collector's guide to a Fascinating World-Wide Philatelic Pursuit
- The Collectors' Guide to Postal Stationery
- What is Postal Stationery?

==== Great Britain ====
- British Postal Stationery, A Priced Handbook of the Postal Stationery of Great Britain
- Collect British Postal Stationery: A Simplified Listing of British Postal Stationery 1840 to 2007
- Postal Stationery of Great Britain

==== United States ====
- Guide to the Stamped Envelopes and Wrappers of the United States
- United States Postal Card Catalog
- Hawaii Postal Stationery
- United States Stamped Envelopes Essays and Proofs

==== Canada ====
- Canada & Newfoundland Postal Stationery Catalogue
- Canadian Precancelled Postal Stationery Handbook
- The Postal Stationery of Canada. A reference catalogue
- The Postal History of the Post Card in Canada 1878 - 1911

==== Australia ====
- The Postal Stationery of the Commonwealth of Australia

==== India ====
- The Comprehensive India States Postal Stationery Listing
- A Guide to Modern Indian Postal Stationery, 1947-2003, Vol. 1 (Envelopes)
- Encyclopedia of Indian Postal Stationery
- British India Postal Stationery
- A Guide to Postal Stationery of India Vol. I, II, III, IV
- Phila Catalogue of Indian Postal Stationery
- The Indian Convention States Postal Stationery
- The Comprehensive India States Postal Stationery Listing
- Postal Stationery of British India, 1856-1947

==== Ireland ====
- Die Ganzsachen Irlands: Postal Stationery of Ireland (2002)
- Die Privatgansachen Irlands: Irish Postal Stationery Stamped to Order (2003)

==== Russia ====
- Marked Postal Cards of the USSR

==== South America ====
- Postal Stationery of Mexico
- Postal Stationery of the Canal Zone
- Postal Stationery of Peru
- The Postal Stationery of the Cuban Republic
- Postal Stationery of Cuba and Puerto Rico Under United States Administration
- Postal Cards of Spanish Colonial Cuba, Philippines and Puerto Rico

==== Africa ====
- Liberian Postal Stationery

=== Periodicals ===
- Postal Stationery (United Postal Stationery Society)
- The Postal Stationery Collector (Postal Stationery Society of Australia)
- The Postal Card Specialist
