= Wrapper (philately) =

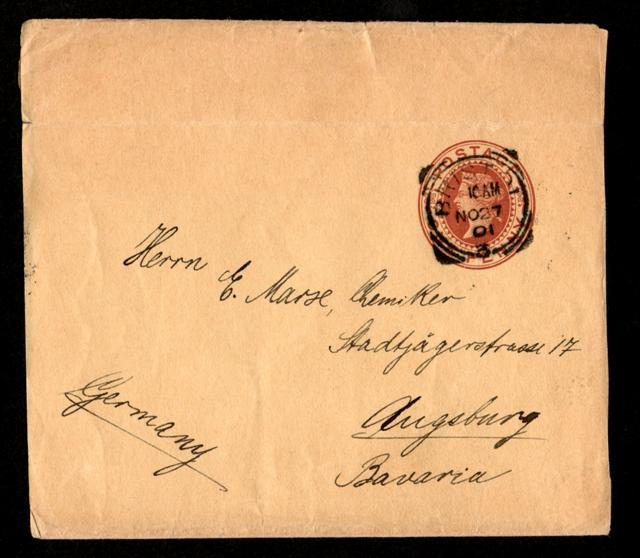
A folded British Queen Victoria one penny wrapper addressed to Augsburg, Bavaria with a Bristol squared-circle cancellation of 10.00 AM 27 November 1901, just five days after the Queen's death. It bears an Augsburg received mark on the back (not shown) dated 29 November showing the journey to have taken only two days.

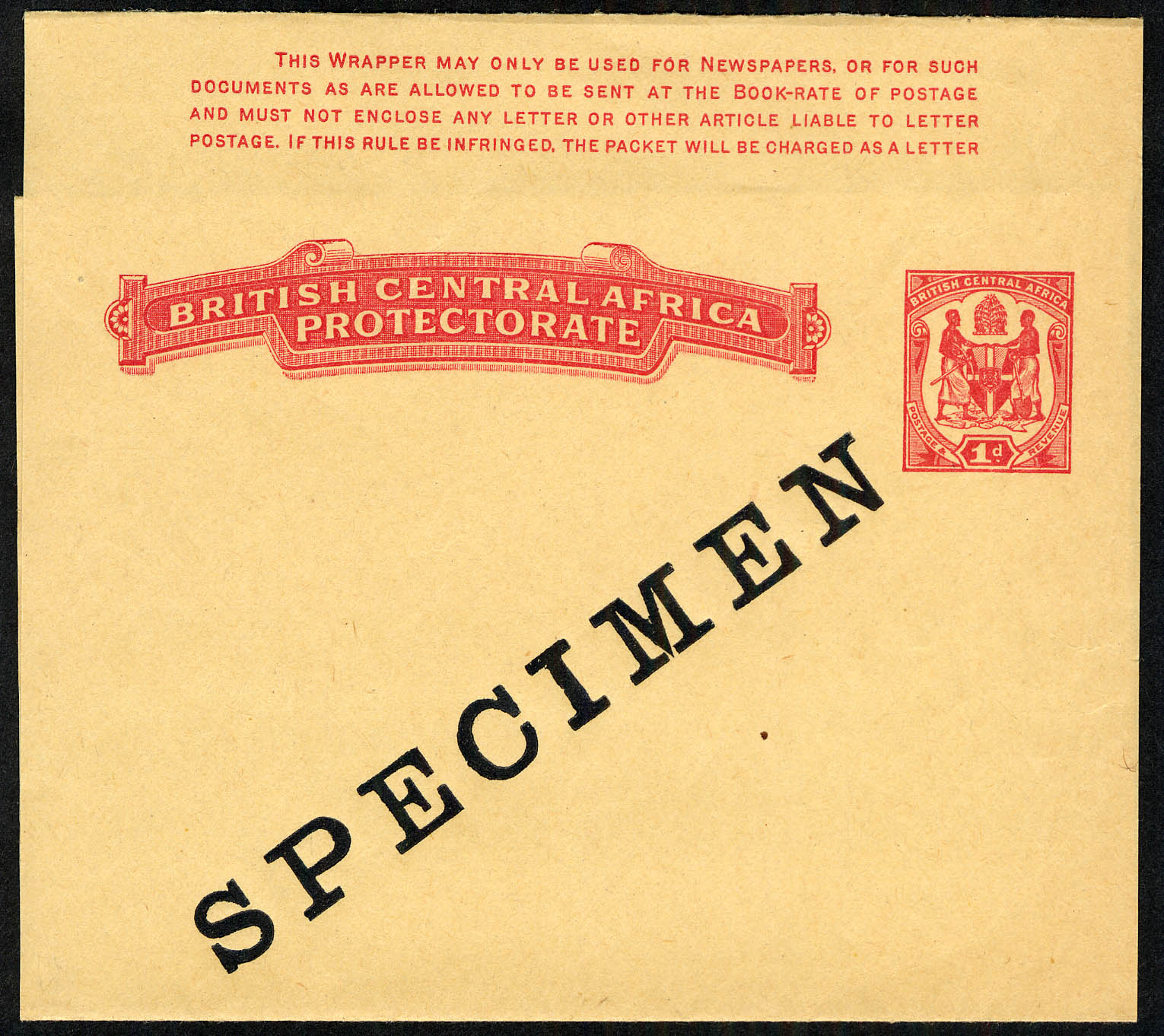
A wrapper issued in 1899 overprinted SPECIMEN. Specimen stamps and similar items were supplied to the Universal Postal Union for distribution to members.

In philately a wrapper is a form of postal stationery which pays the cost of the delivery of a newspaper or a periodical. The wrapper is a sheet of paper, large enough to wrap around a folded or rolled newspaper and with an imprinted stamp to pay the cost of postage. Some catalogs and reference books refer to a wrapper as postal bands which comes from the French term bandes postale. Still others refer to it as a newspaper wrapper or periodical wrapper.

== History ==
The first country to issue wrappers was the United States in October 1861, followed by New South Wales (1864), North German Confederation (1868), Victoria (1869), Romania (1870), Great Britain (1870), in total 110 countries issued wrappers.

Charles Knight is considered as the first person to propose the use of stamped wrappers or as the "inventor". He made the proposal in 1834 in a letter to Lord Althorp, Chancellor of the Exchequer. Following this in the course of the debate on 22 May 1834, in the House of Commons, Matthew Davenport Hill MP, brother of Sir Rowland Hill, advocating the payment of a penny upon an unstamped newspaper sent by post, stated: "...to put an end to any objections that might be made as to the difficulty of collecting the money, he would adopt the suggestion of a person well qualified to give an opinion on the subject—he alluded to Mr Knight, the publisher. That gentleman recommended that a stamped wrapper should be prepared for such newspapers as it was desired to send by post, and that each wrapper should be sold at the rate of 1d by the distributors of stamps..."

All the countries which issued wrappers have now discontinued producing them due to the declining usage. The US removed them from the official schedule on 9 October 1934 though left over stock was sold for a few years thereafter. Most countries stopped production by 1940, some of the last countries to cease issuing wrappers were Australia in 1980, Ireland in 1984, Barbados in 1990 and Cyprus in 1991.

== Collecting ==
In the early days of philately it was the practice to cut the stamp out and dispose of the rest of the wrapper with the result that some intact wrappers are now rare. Today, collectors prefer to collect the whole wrapper as it may have postal markings that provide interesting additional information.

Stamps cut from whole postal stationery items are known as cut squares, and if used for postal purposes as cut-outs. Both are considered virtually useless to the specialist because there is as much interest in the different printed inscriptions on the postal stationery as there is in the stamp itself.

== Stamped-to-order ==
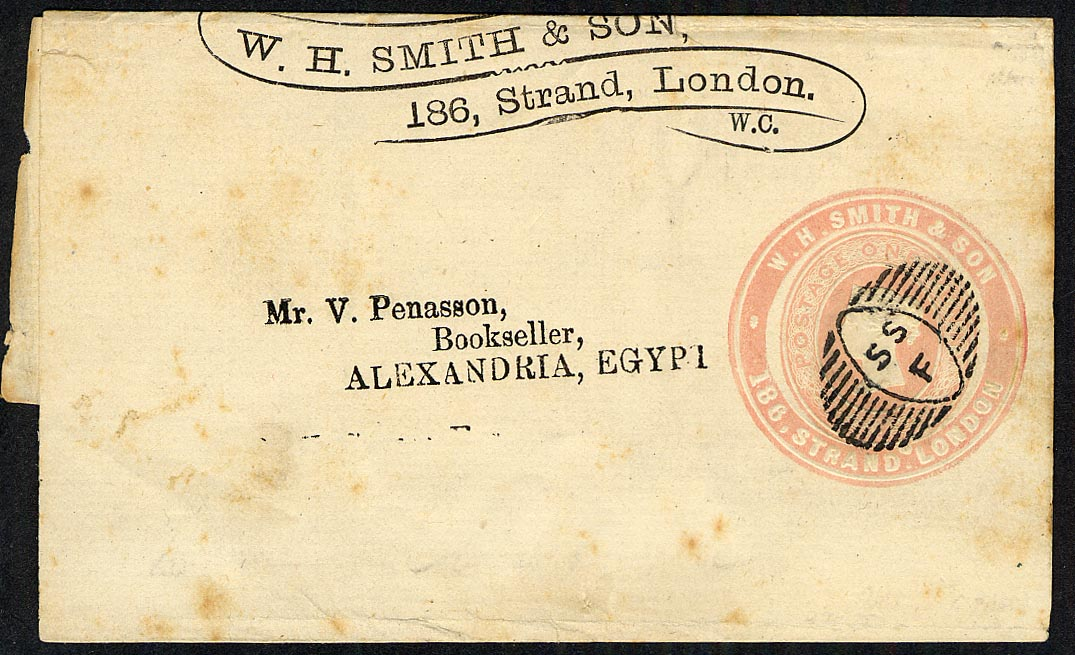
A Stamped to Order wrapper for W H Smith & Son, addressed to Alexandria Egypt, in addition to the impressed stamp there is an advertising ring around the stamp, the embossed stamp is dated 13.1.1882, postmarked with a special precancel postmark for W H Smith.

Some countries permitted businesses and individuals to submit their own plain or printed sheets for impressing with an imprinted stamp. In Great Britain numerous businesses availed themselves of this facility and since anyone could use this service it resulted in private individuals producing "philatelic" wrappers. The stamping-to-order facility was introduced in Great Britain in 1855 and withdrawn in 1973.

Stamped-to-order wrappers are also known from Australia, Austria, Bavaria, France, Germany, New South Wales, Switzerland, Tasmania and Wurttemberg

== See also ==
- Newspaper stamp
