= Imprinted stamp =

Stamp printed onto a piece of postal stationery

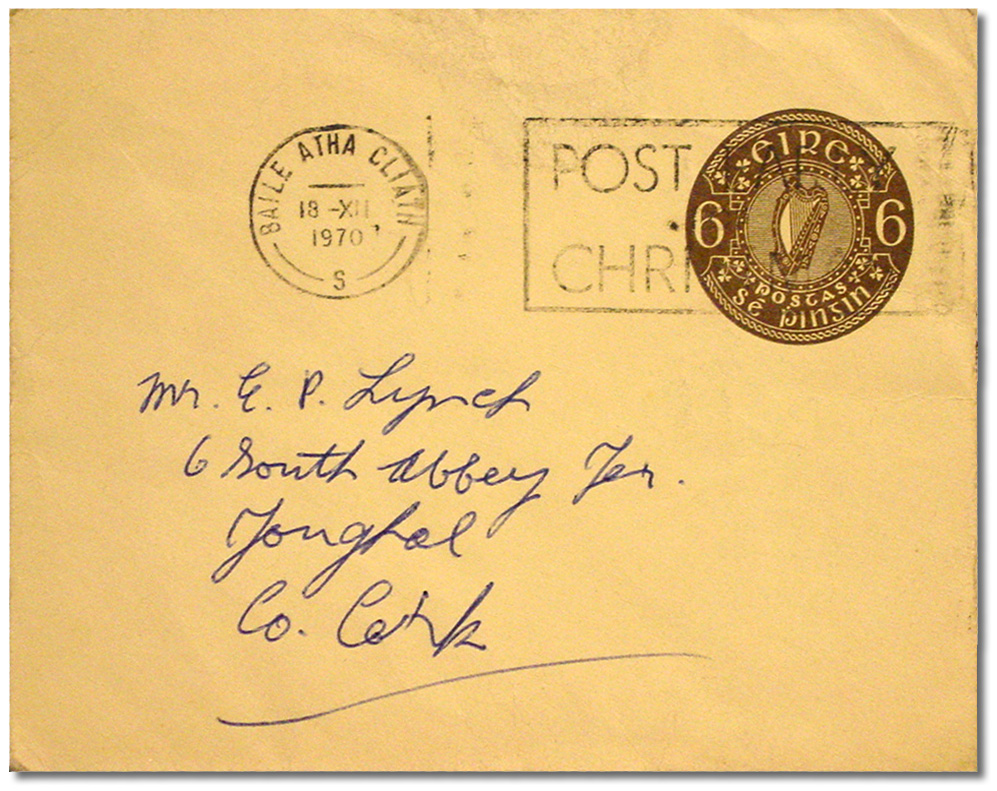
An imprinted stamp on an Irish pre-paid envelope, used 1970.

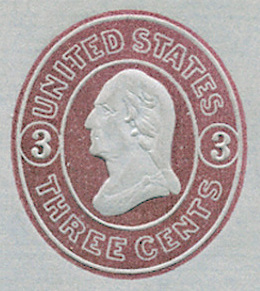
An example of an embossed postage stamp, called an indicium, on an 1861 U.S. letter sheet. Note the raised portions.

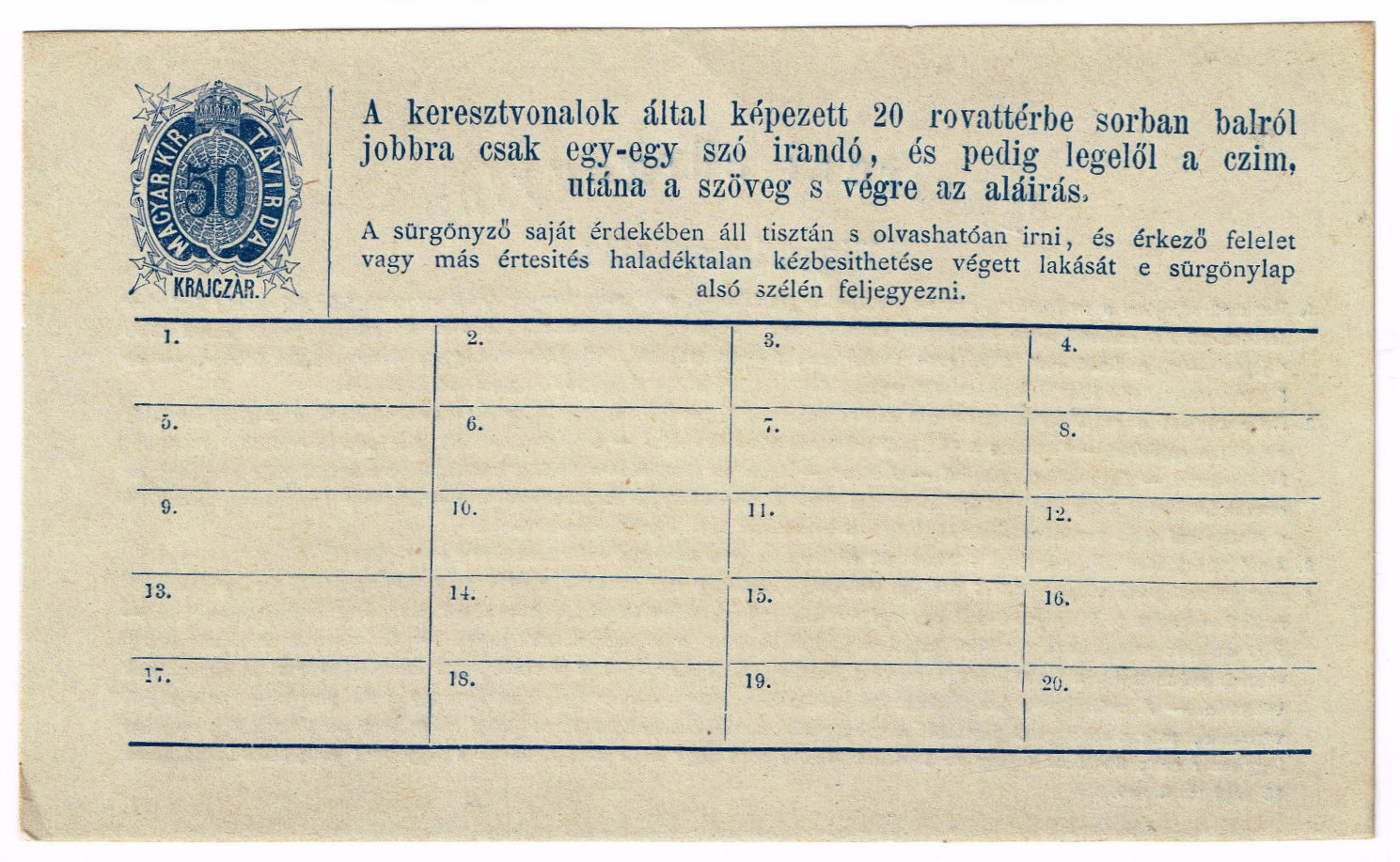
A Hungarian telegram form with an imprinted stamp from the later part of the nineteenth century.

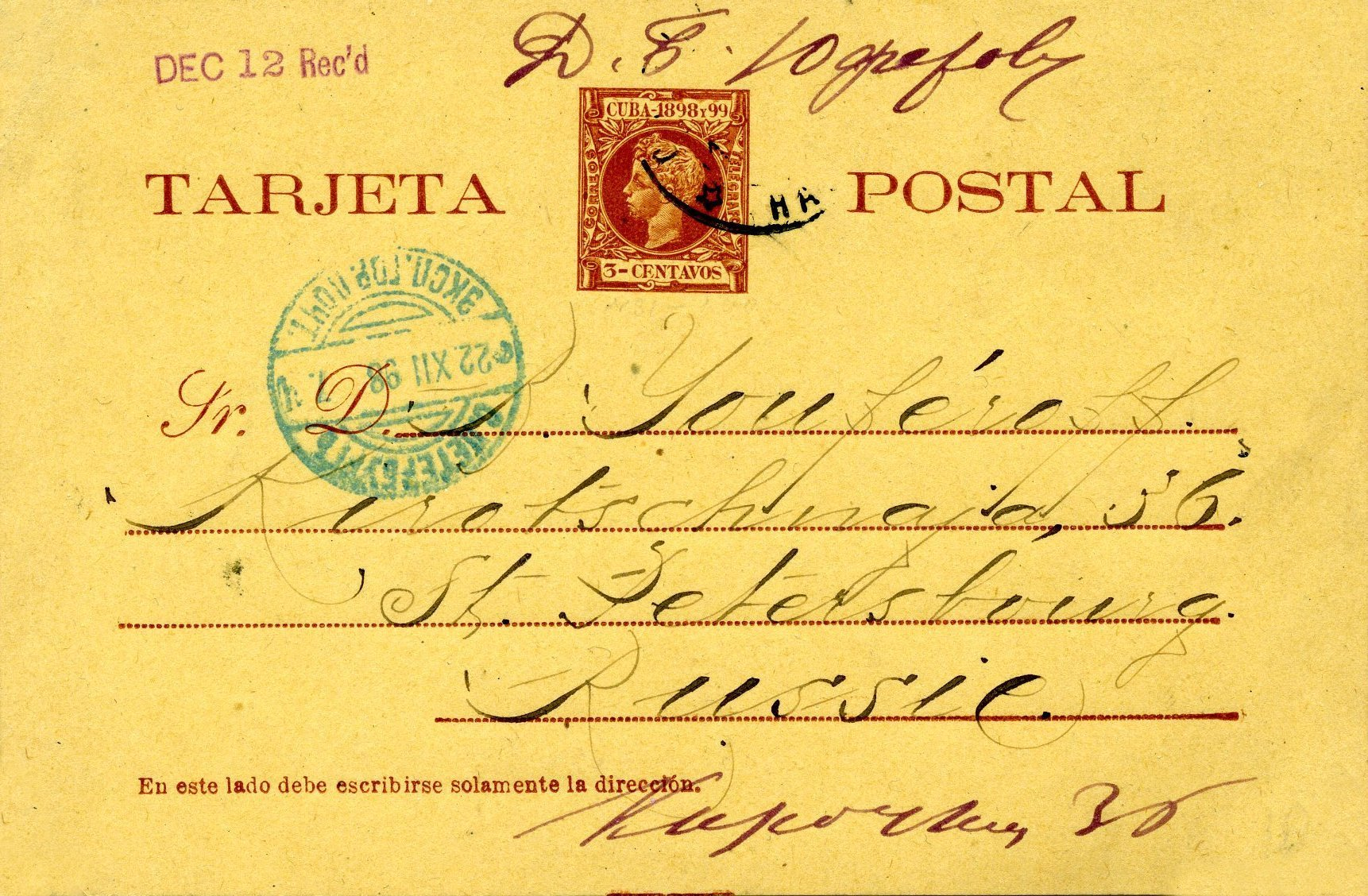
An imprinted stamp on an 1898 Cuba postal card.

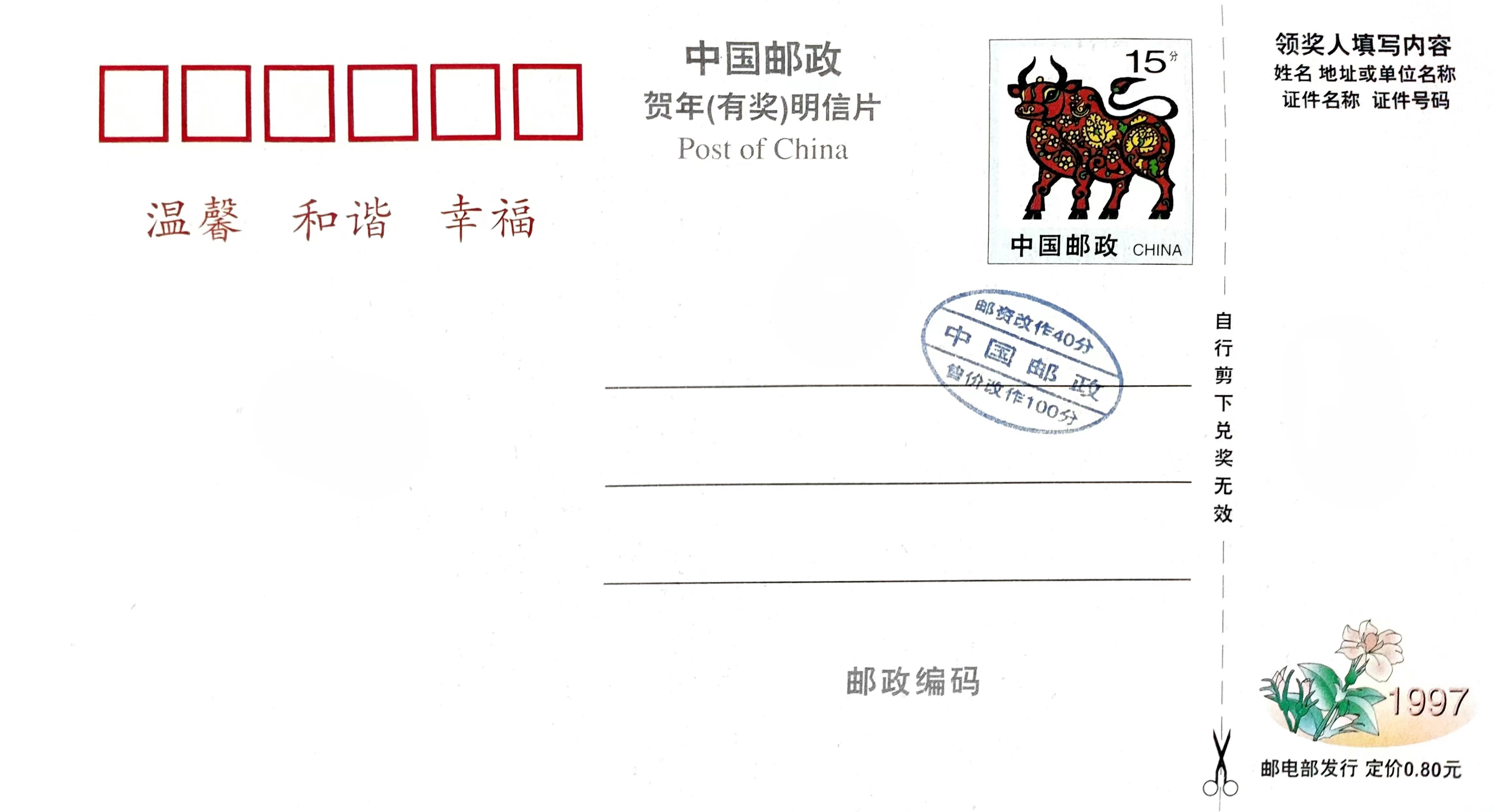
An overprinted surcharged imprinted stamp on a Chinese zodiac "Year of the ox" postal card, 1997

In philately, an imprinted stamp is a stamp printed onto a piece of postal stationery such as a stamped envelope, postal card, letter sheet, letter card, aerogram or wrapper. The printing may be flat upon the surface of the paper, or embossed with a raised relief. An imprinted stamp is also known as unadhesive stamp or indicium.

The cost of the item of stationery includes the manufacture of the item and the charge for postal service. The design of imprinted stamps often bears a close resemblance to normal adhesive stamps of the same country and era. It may be a definitive or commemorative stamp.

== Collecting ==
In the early days of philately, it was common to cut the imprinted stamp from the rest of the item and retain only the stamp. This is known as a cut square. In the U.K. this is known as cut-out. If the imprinted stamp is then trimmed around the edges, it is known as cut to shape. It is a full corner if it has the complete corner of the envelope with side and back flaps attached. Today collectors much prefer to keep postal stationery items intact, because cutting destroys the postal history, the knife of the stamped envelope, the postmark and any receiving marks.

== Usage ==
Some countries permitted the use of a cut-out imprinted stamp to pay postage on another item of mail. This is also known as a cut-out.

Items of postal stationery with an imprinted stamp are sometimes found with adhesive stamps added to pay for additional services such as airmail, registration or the part transport of mail by a local postal service. Such covers are known as conjunctive covers, and such use is known as a conjunctive use. Placement of the adhesive stamp in addition to the imprinted stamp in order to pay a higher postal rate is called "uprated" (Spanish= franqueos complementarios). This term also applies when an imprinted or embossed stamp is overprinted or handstamped to increase the face value.

== See also ==
- Embossed postage stamp
