= Aerogram =

Postal stationery product

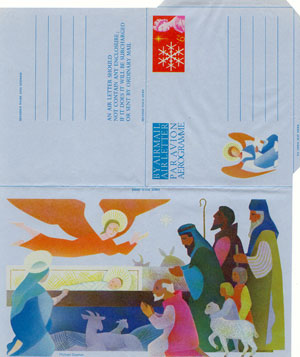
GB Christmas Aerogram (one of two issued in 1967)

An aerogram, aerogramme, aérogramme, air letter or airletter is a thin lightweight piece of foldable and gummed paper for writing a letter for transit via airmail, in which the letter and envelope are one and the same. Most postal administrations forbid including items inside these light letters, which are usually sent abroad at a preferential rate, and enclosing items may cause the mail to go at the higher letter rate.

The use of the term aerogramme was officially endorsed at the 1952 Universal Postal Union Postal Union Congress in Brussels. Thereafter, the term air letter quickly faded from use.

Most aerograms have an imprinted stamp indicating the prepayment of postage, which meets the definition of being postal stationery. However, some countries, such as Zimbabwe and Ireland, sell unstamped aerograms. Unstamped aerograms are referred to as formular aerograms and can be issued by postal authorities or private companies. Senders are required to write their name and address on the reverse.

== History ==
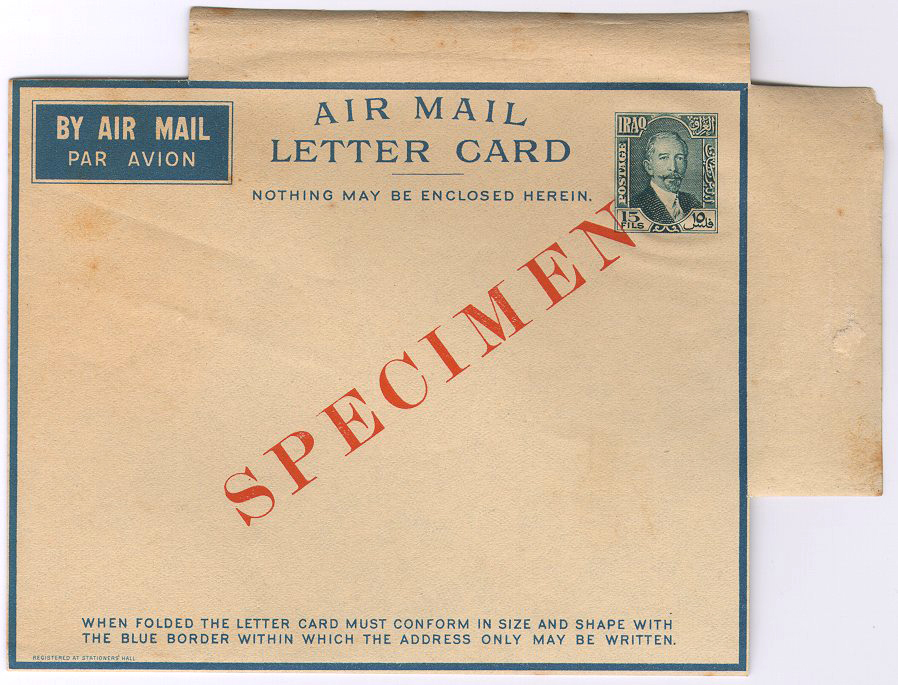
The first issued aerogramme – Iraq 1933

Lieutenant Colonel R. E. Evans first saw the air letter form in Iraq, whilst touring the Commands after his arrival in the Middle East theatre. It had been introduced into the Iraqi postal service in 1933 by the then Inspector General of Posts and Telegraphs, Major Douglas William Gumbley CBE DSO Royal Engineers. The original form, on thin paper sized 124 mm x 99 mm, greyish in colour, with bluelined framing and with the designation legend on the front. It had an embossed effigy of Faisal I of Iraq and was printed by Bradbury Wilkinson.

The aerogram was largely popularized by its use during the Second World War (1939–1945). Lieutenant Colonel R. E. Evans, Royal Engineers, Assistant Director Army Postal Service Middle East Force (MEF), proposed that a lightweight self-sealing letter card that weighed only 1/10 oz (2.8 g) be adopted by the British Army for air mail purposes. He recommended its use to Anthony Eden, the Secretary of State for War during his visit to the Middle East, in late 1940. By January the following year, General Archibald Wavell, 1st Earl Wavell, the Commander-in-Chief, MEF was told by Eden that "Your Assistant Director Army Postal Services may forthwith introduce an Air Mail Letter Card Service for the Middle East. Use British stamps from all countries, including Egypt.".

On 1 March 1941, the air mail service between the Middle East and the UK was started, using a combination of British Overseas Airways flying boats and military transport. The private nature of the air letter ensured its popularity among its users and that popularity, with its lightness, brought about its continued use as the civilian air letter (aerogramme) and the British military "bluey". (see British Forces Post Office for further information). The aerogramme cost 6d to send anywhere in the world from 1943 to 1966, increasing to 9d until the decimalisation of British currency in 1971, then increasing gradually to 45p (decimal), 18 times the introductory price, in 2006.

On 29 April 1947, the US introduced a 10 cent Air Letter Sheet. The same imprinted stamp with the propeller plane was used until updated with a jet airliner image in 1958. The US issued a total of 25 aerograms until 1999. The production of United States aerograms has ceased. Linn's Stamp News in late 2006 reported that the United States Postal Service had announced that as the supply of aerograms on hand at post offices were exhausted the stock would not be replenished. It quotes David Failor, Postal Service executive director of stamp services as explaining, "Demand for these has been next to nothing for the past five years."

With the decline in postal communication, aerograms have been withdrawn by various postal services. Royal Mail in the United Kingdom discontinued the aerogram in 2012. Japan Post Holdings announced its aerogram service would end on 30 September 2023. As of July 2024, they were still provided by Australia Post and Hongkong Post.

Historically, as the aerogram was the least expensive form of international postal communication, users often went to extreme lengths to make best use of the space available including writing in different colours, in different directions, and printing on the sheets minimising font size and margins.

== See also ==
- Lettercard
- Letter sheet
- V-mail
