= List of stationery topics =

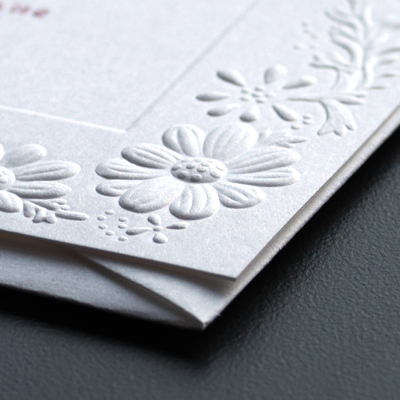
Embossed stationery

This is a list of stationery topics. Stationery has historically pertained to a wide gamut of materials: paper and office supplies, writing implements, greeting cards, glue, pencil cases and other similar items.

== Stationery topics ==
=== B ===
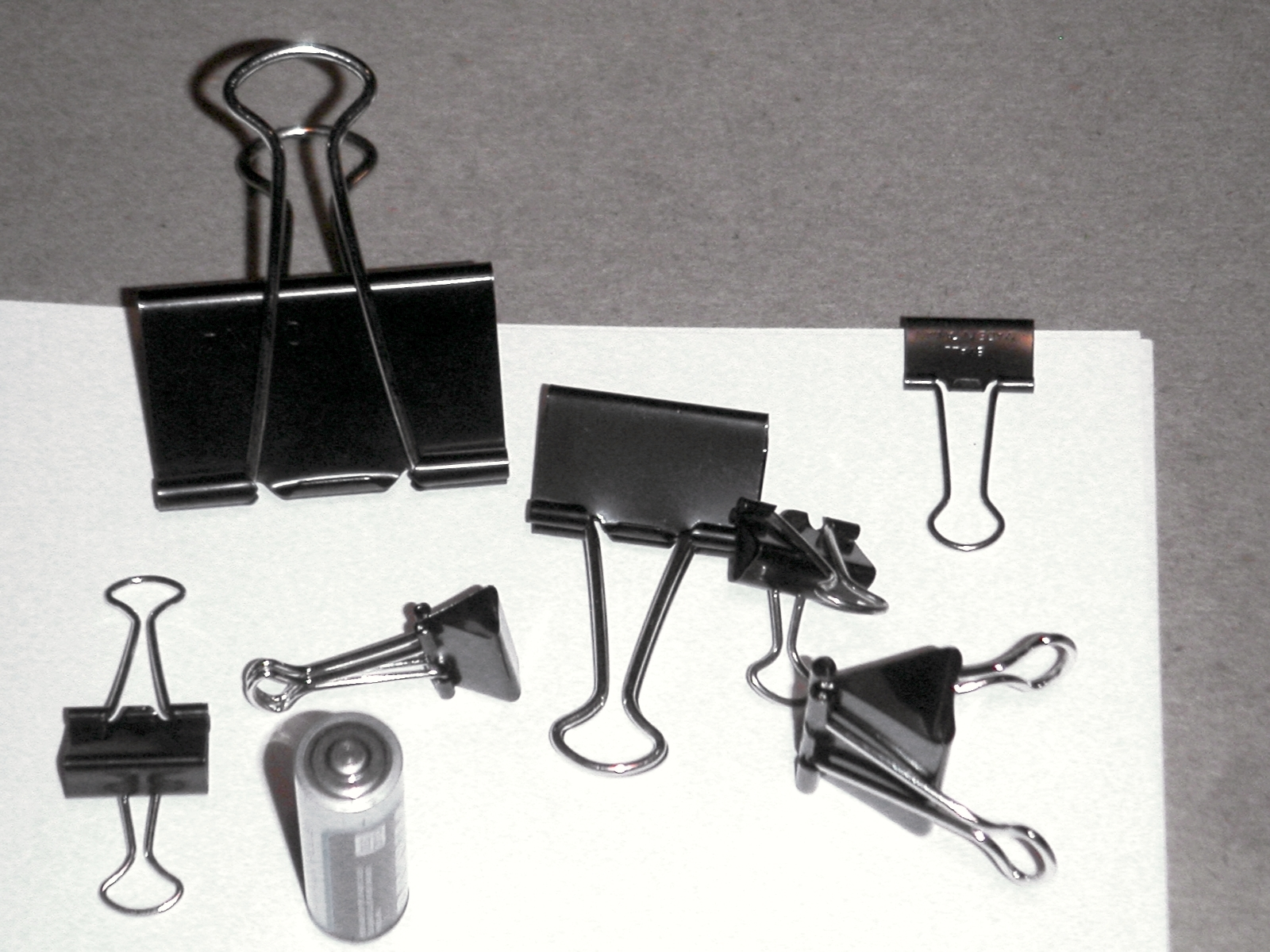
An assortment of binder clips, with an AA battery for scale

- Binder clip
- Black n' Red
- Brass fastener
- Bulldog clip
- Business card

- Black Astrum
- HCard
- Internet business card
- Portable Contacts
- Trade card
- VCard
- Visiting card

=== C ===
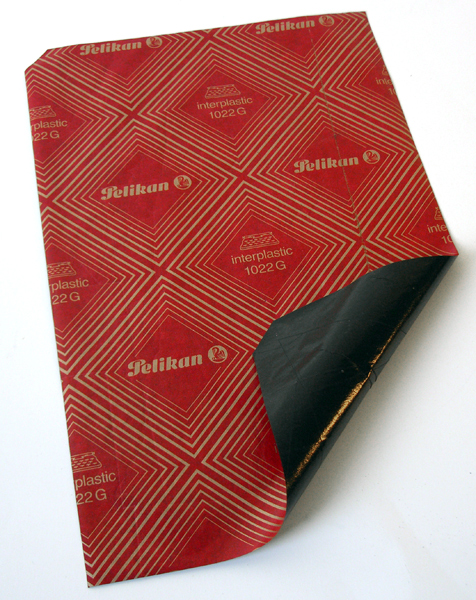
A sheet of carbon paper, with the coating side down

- Carbon paper
- Cartridge paper
- Chalkboard eraser
- Clipboard
- Colour pencil
- Compliments slip
- Continuous stationery
- Correction fluid
- Correction paper
- Correction tape
- Crane & Co.
- Crayon

=== D ===
- Derwent Cumberland Pencil
- Drawing pin
- Dymotape

=== E ===
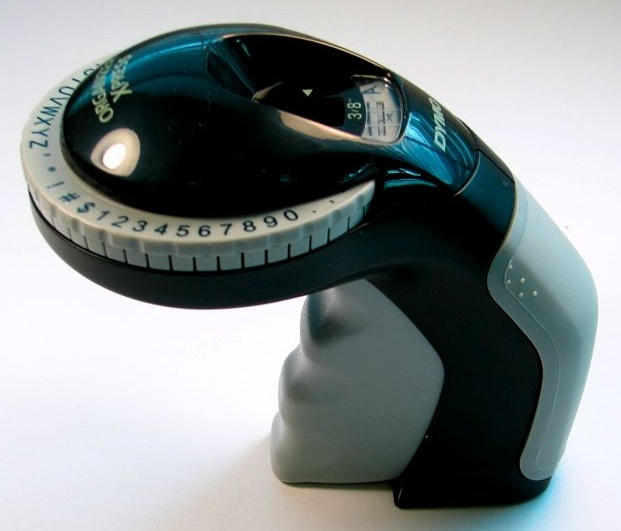
A handheld embosser

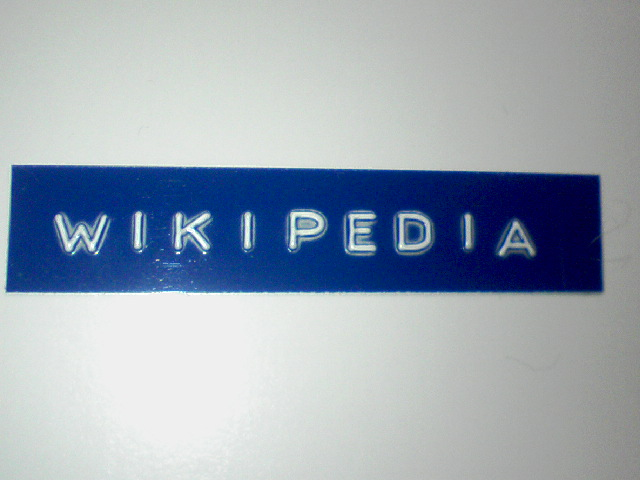
Information printed on embossing tape

- E-card
- Embossing
- Embossing tape
- Engraving
- Envelope
- Eraser
- Esselte

=== F ===
- File folder
- Foolscap folio
- Fevicol

=== G ===
- Greeting card

- American Greetings
- Archies Ltd
- Baby announcement
- Cardmaking
- Cards (iOS)
- Carlton Cards
- Celebrations Group
- Christmas card
- Cookie bouquet
- CSS Industries
- Forever Friends
- Get-well card
- The Greeting Card Association (U.K.)
- Hallmark Cards

- Hallmark Business Connections
- Hallmark holiday

- Holiday greetings
- Hoops&Yoyo
- Irving I. Stone
- Marcus Ward & Co
- Moonpig
- Naughty cards
- New Year Card
- Nobleworks
- Recycled Paper Greetings
- Studio cards
- Touchnote
- Twisted Whiskers
- Uncooked
- Video ecard

=== H ===
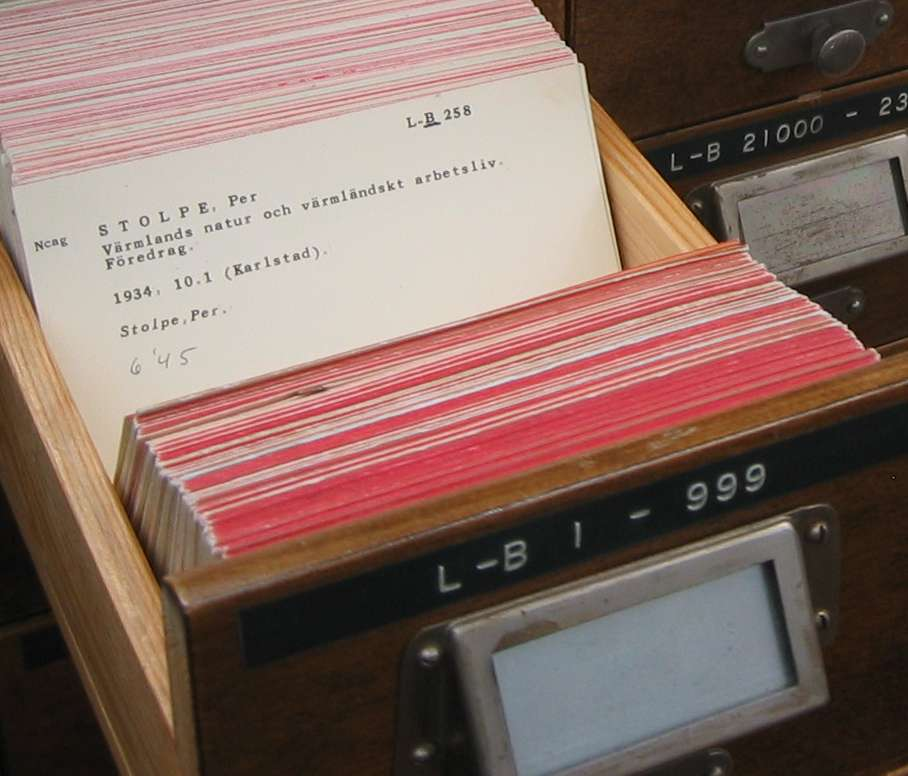
An index card in a library card catalog. In the computer age, this type of cataloging is now mostly obsolete.

- Highlighter
- Hipster PDA

=== I ===
- Index card
- ISO 216
- ISO 217

=== J ===
- Japanese stationery

- Copic
- Genkō yōshi
- Hobonichi Techo
- Kuretake (art products)
- Namiki
- Pentel
- Pilot (pen company)
- Shitajiki
- Tombow
- Triart Design Marker
- Tsujiura
- Uni-ball

=== K ===
- Knife (envelope)

=== L ===
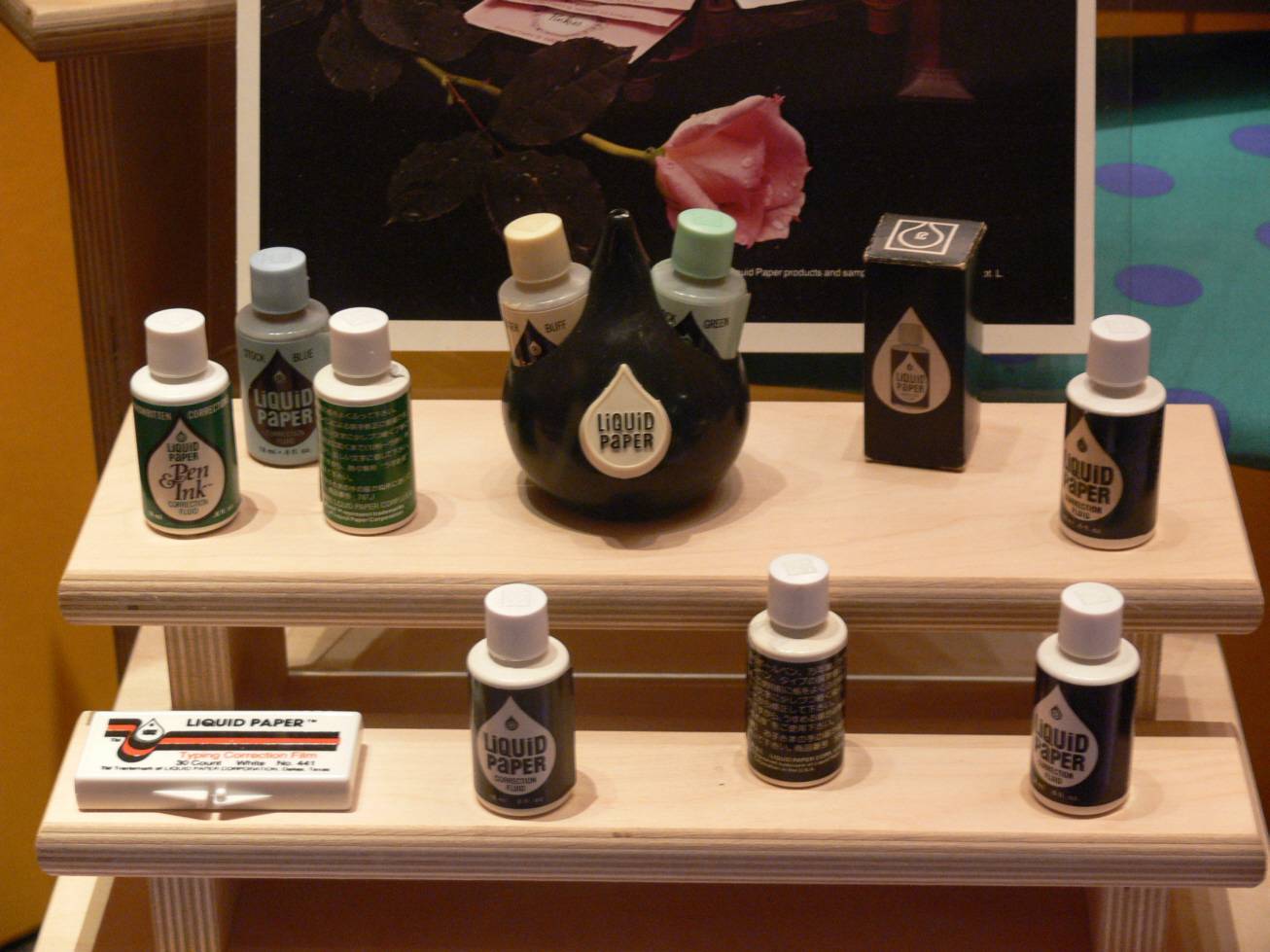
Liquid Paper products on display at The Women's Museum in Dallas, Texas

- Label
- Lawyers bodkin
- Letter (paper size)
- Letterpress printing
- Liquid Paper

=== M ===
- Manila folder
- Marker pen
- Moleskine
- Mourning stationery

=== N ===
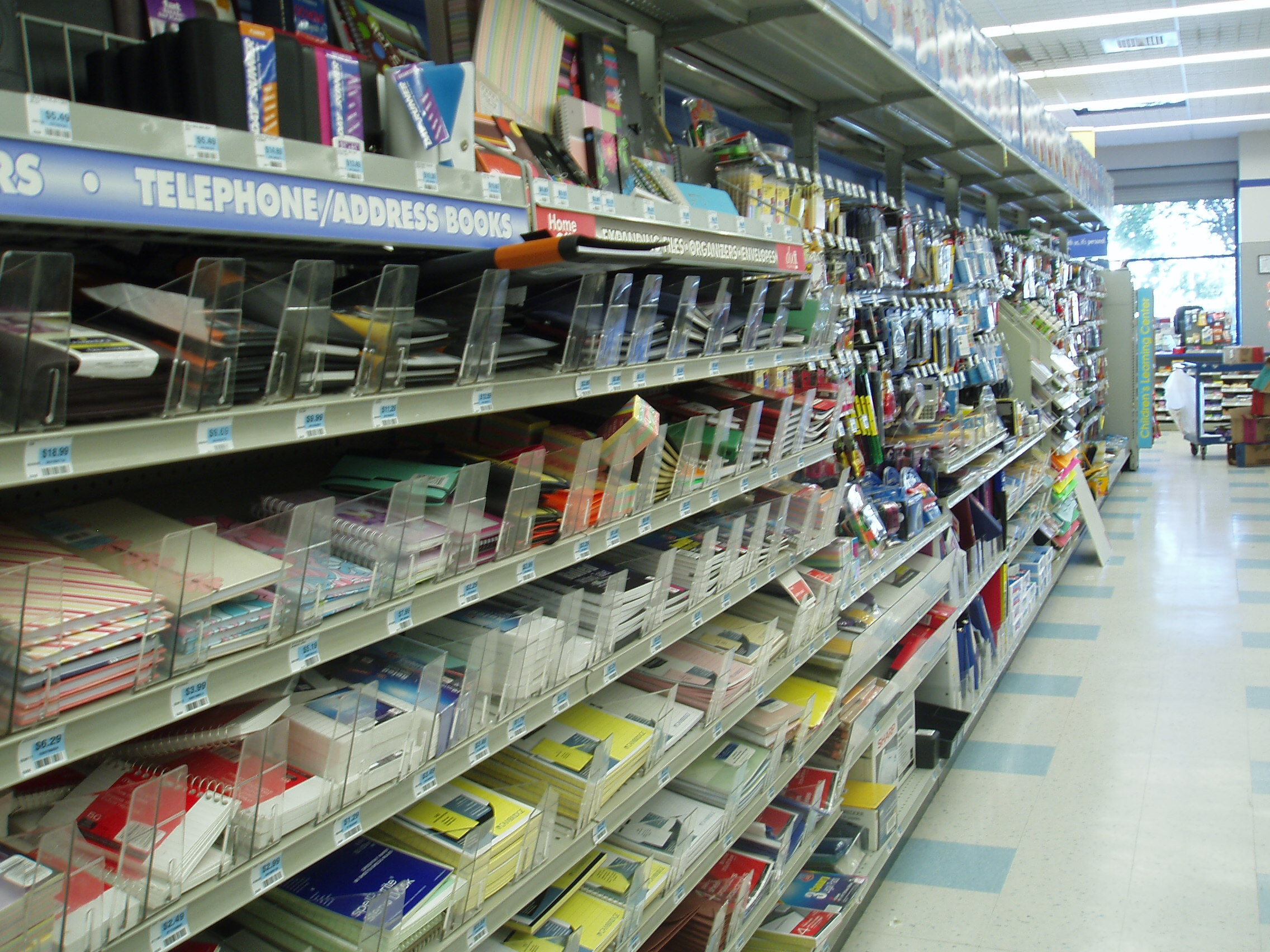
Notebooks for sale at a department store

- Needle card
- Notebook

- Big Chief tablet
- Classmate Stationery
- Composition book
- Diary
- Electronic lab notebook
- Inventor's notebook
- Lab notebook

- Open notebook science

- Personal organizer
- Police notebook
- Ring binder
- Sketchbook

=== P ===
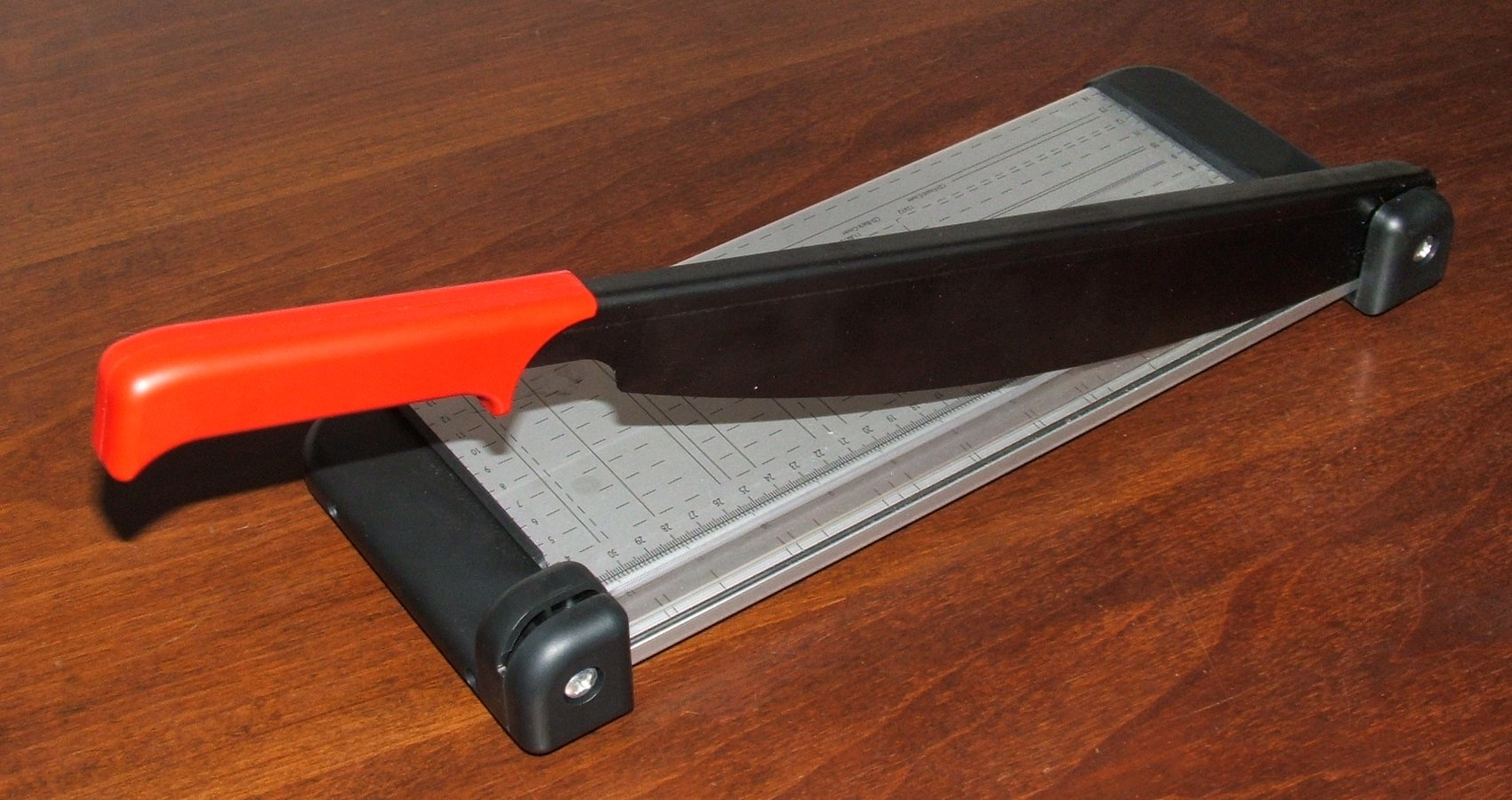
A paper cutter

- Paper
- Paper clip
- Paper cutter
- Paper Mate
- Paper size
- Pee Chee folder
- Pen
- Pencil
- Pencil Case
- Post-it note

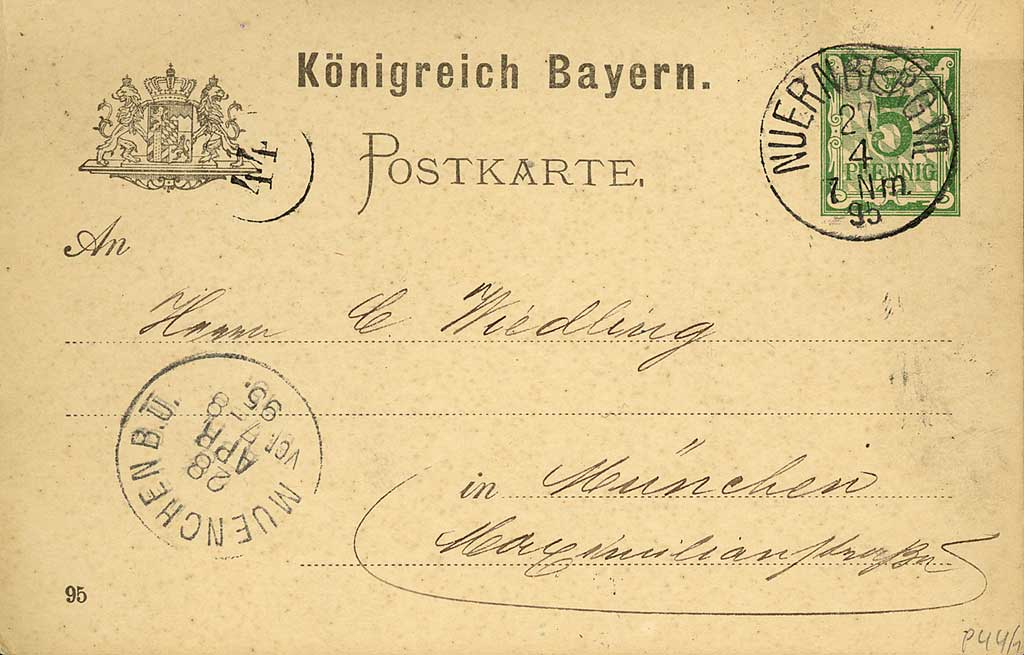
A Bavarian postal card from 1895 with an imprinted stamp

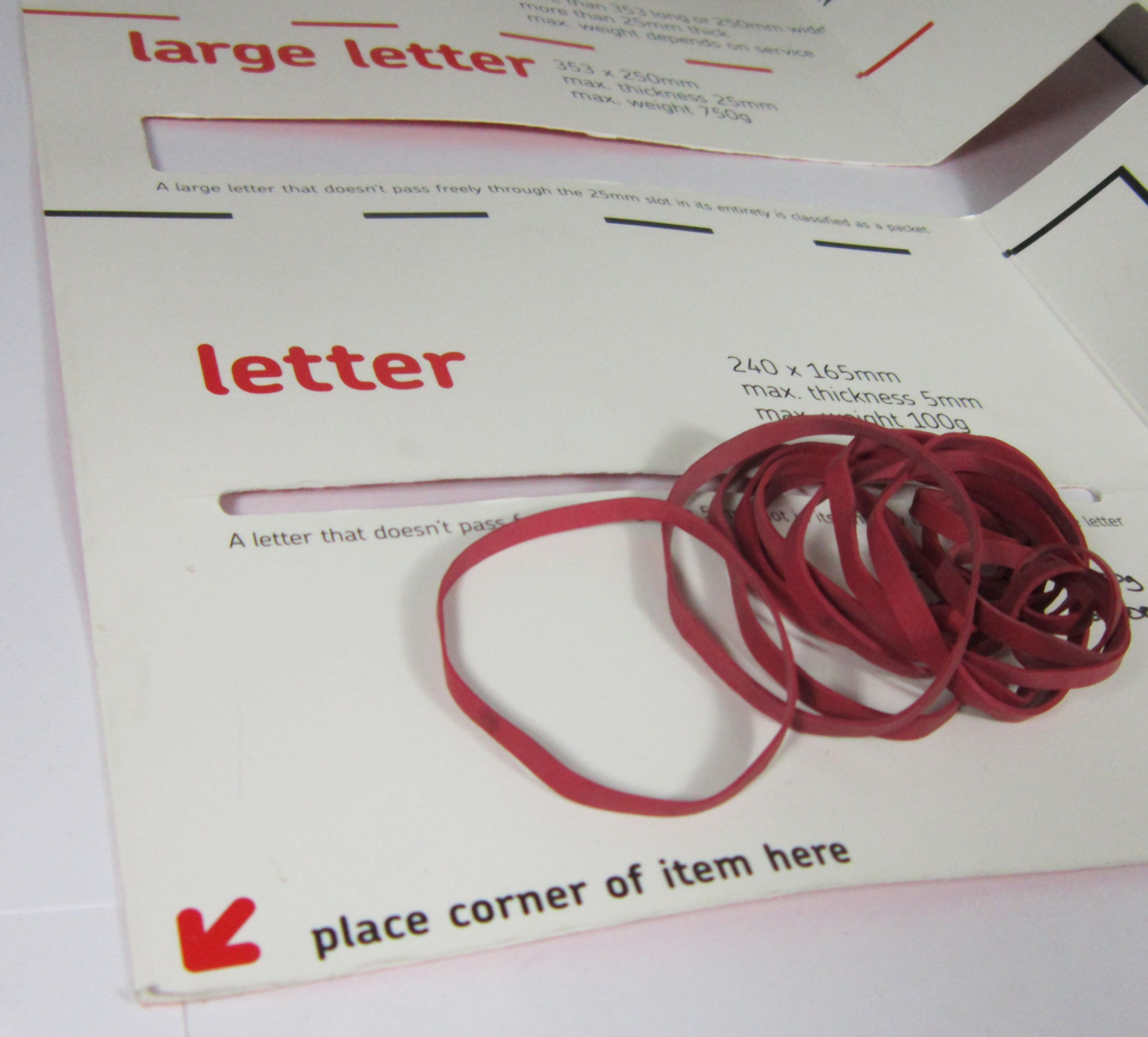
Some Royal Mail rubber bands, on top of letter size guide

- Postal stationery

- Aerogram
- Corner card
- Cut square
- Cut to shape
- Formular stationery
- Higgins & Gage World Postal Stationery Catalog
- Imprinted stamp
- International reply coupon
- Letter sheet
- Lettercard
- Mulready stationery
- Postal card
- Postal order
- Postal Stationery Society
- Postcard
- Sherborn Collection
- Stamped envelope
- United Postal Stationery Society
- Wrapper

- Presentation folder
- Pressure-sensitive adhesive
- Pressure-sensitive tape

=== R ===
- Royal Mail rubber band
- Rubber band
- Ruler
- rubber
- reading ruler

=== S ===
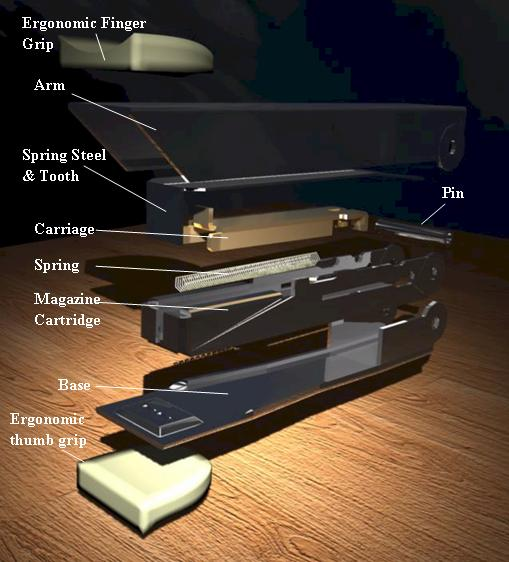
An exploded view drawing of a stapler

- Seal
- Sharpie
- Smythson
- Spindle
- Springback binder
- Staple
- Stapler
- Stationers (companies)

- Stationers of the United Kingdom

- Basildon Bond
- Macniven and Cameron
- Paperchase
- Partners the Stationer

- Stationers (people)

- Edward Allde
- John Allde
- George Eld
- Theophilus Johnson
- John Masiakowski
- Leonard Pagliero
- Henry Wise

- Sticker

=== T ===
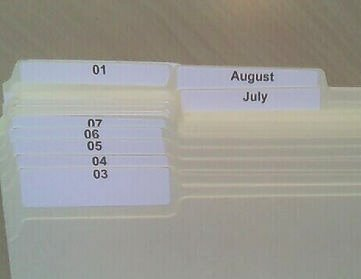
A simple tickler file

- teNeues
- Thermographic printing
- Tickler file
- Tipp-Ex
- Trade card
- Trapper Keeper
- Treasury tag

=== V ===
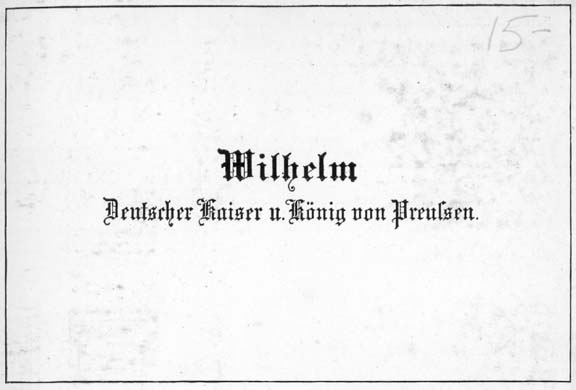
Visiting card of Kaiser Wilhelm

- Visiting card

=== W ===
- Watermark
- Wite-Out
- Worksheet
- Water colour
- Washi paper
