= Thermographic printing =

Method of printing using heat

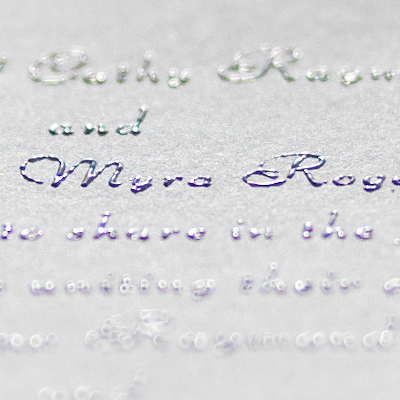
Example of thermographic printing. The uneven quality of the text is a result of the process and easily differentiates thermographic printing from engraving

Thermographic printing refers to two types of printing, both of which rely on heat to create the letters or images on a sheet of paper.

The simplest type of thermography is where the paper has been coated with a material that changes colour on heating. This is called thermal printing and was used in older model fax machines and is used in most shop till receipt printers. This is called direct thermal.

More complex is thermal transfer printing that melts print off a ribbon and onto the sheet of paper.

== Thermography as raised print process ==
Thermography is also the name of a post print process that is achieved today using traditional printing methods coupled with thermography machines. Thermography machines consist of three sections with a through conveyor.

The first section applies thermographic/embossing powder, made from plastic resins, to the substrate (normally paper). The areas selected for raised printing are printed with slow-drying inks that do not contain dryers or hardeners so that they remain wet during the application of powder. This ink is dried and hardened later during the heating process.

The second section of the process is a vacuum system that removes excess powder from areas of the sheet that were not printed.

The third section of the process conveys the product through a radiant oven where it is exposed to temperatures of 900 to 1300°F (500-700°C). The heating process takes on the order of 2.5 to 3 seconds. The substrate (usually paper) has a peak in IR absorption at the wavelength used. Through conduction from the paper, the powder temperature rapidly increases and starts melting. When the process is correctly adjusted, the center of the largest filmed areas reach sufficient quality level as the product exits the heater. The melted ink then solidifies as the product cools.

This process is sometimes produced using manual powdering. The substrate with the wet ink is dipped into the powdered polymer. The sheet is then tilted back and forth, rolling the powder across the image. The excess powder is then removed by raising the substrate to a vertical position and lightly tapping the back side. The powdered sheet is then fed into a radiant heating system (as above) at a speed that achieves a good-quality melted film. In the case of craft applications, the powder is melted using a heatgun that blows hot air.

It is commonly used on wedding invitations, letterheads, business cards, greeting cards, gift wrap, packaging, etc. It is sometimes used in diploma printing as a low-cost alternative to engraved embossing.

== See also ==
- Dye sublimation
- List of stationery topics
