= Cold foil printing =

Cold foil printing, also known as cold foil stamping, is a modern method of printing metallic foil on a substrate in order to enhance the aesthetic of the final product. Cold foil printing can be done two ways: the older dry lamination process common in the offset printing industry, or the newer, more versatile wet lamination process, which is dominant in the flexo label industry.

== How it works ==
=== Cold foil dry lamination ===
Using a standard printing plate, an image is printed onto a substrate with the use of an ultraviolet-curable cold foil adhesive. An ultraviolet dryer then cures the adhesive, which becomes tacky. Foil spools from an unwind and is nipped to a substrate. Foil sticks to the tacky adhesive on the substrate, and an image with a bright foil surface is created. Foil that does not adhere to the adhesive remains on a thin polyester liner, and waste is directed to a rewind spool. Because the adhesive is applied on press like a conventional ink, no expensive stamping die has to be created.

Once printed, the surface of cold foil images may be varnished, laminated, or encapsulated in order to provide a hard-wearing, durable surface.

=== Substrates ===
Some printing substrates are unsuitable for cold foil transfer. The best results are obtained on glossy coated papers and papers with a smooth surface. Weights from about 80 to 500 g/m^2 are possible.

== Benefits ==
The process does not require stamping tools, but instead uses printing plates, which are cheaper and can be made in a few hours. In contrast, delivery time for an engraved or etched stamping tool can be up to two weeks. More importantly for the designer, gradients and halftone images can be introduced.

== History ==
=== Hot foil stamping ===
Cold foil evolved from hot foil stamping. Hot foil stamping is mostly used offline when foil is required on a preprinted substrate, such as in the manufacture of greeting cards and special occasion ribbons. Hot foil is economical but very slow. The types of graphics that can be applied are usually limited to text and bold images. Hot foil is not usable with heat-sensitive substrates such as polyethylene, vinyl, or shrink film.

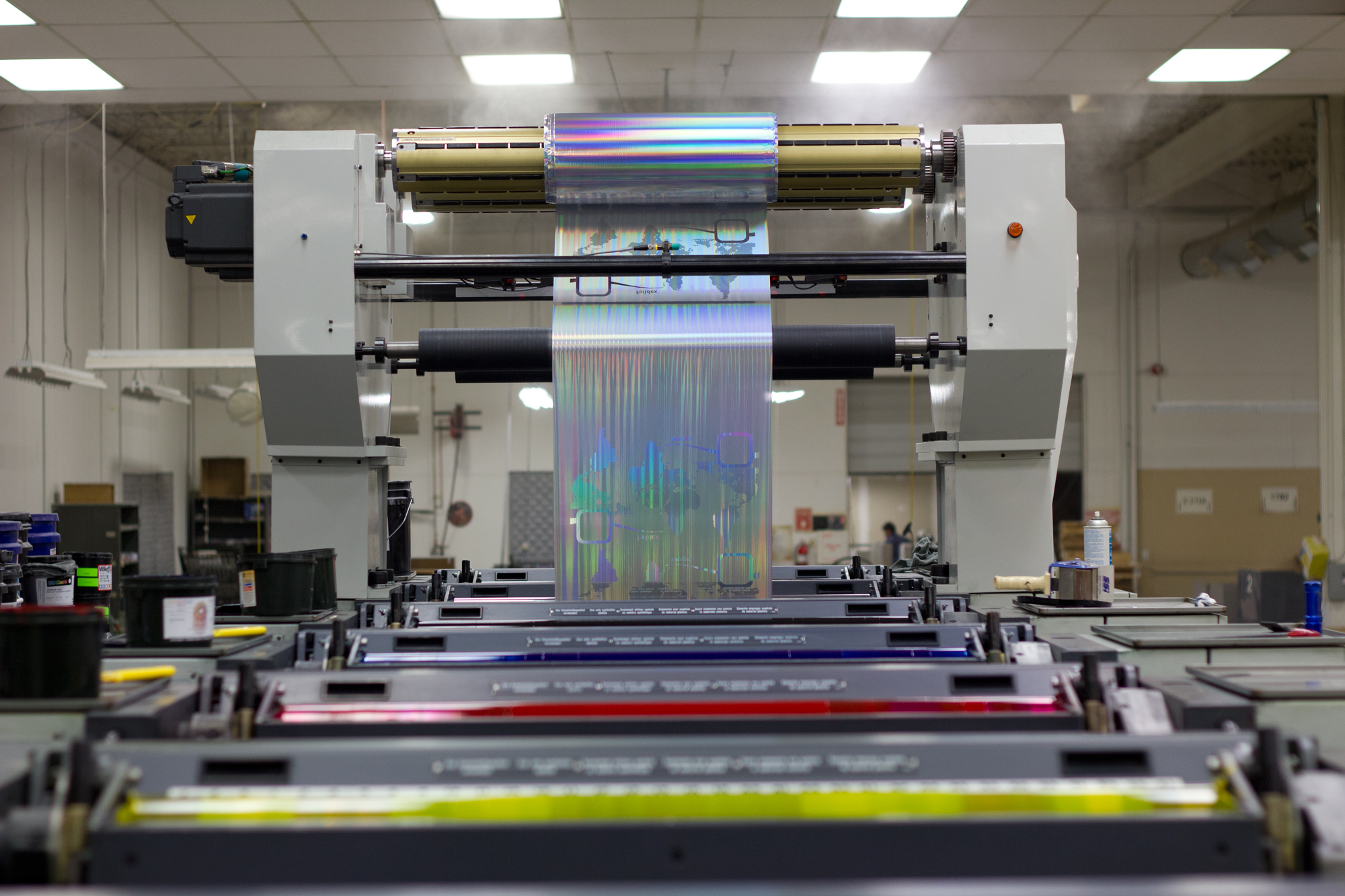
In-line cold foil printer

=== Cold foil evolution ===
Cold foil takes the idea of hot foil stamping and makes it more convenient and cost-effective. The cold foil functions like an additional ink and is actually a UV-curable, very fast lamination adhesive and can be bonded in-line in a single run using a printing plate for either flexographic web printing or offset sheet-fed printing. It can be applied precisely with high resolution, even for fine structures such as raster gradients and thin lines. Typeface is legible from about 5 points upwards and has excellent edge definition. Cold foil printing needs smooth surface substrates for excellent image quality.

==== Cold foil indexing ====
As the cold foil market evolves, major players in the printing industry are finding ways to make the process even more cost-effective. By indexing cold foil, printers can reduce foil waste, reduce their presses' downtime, and in turn maximize their presses' efficiency.

== Uses ==
Cold foil is most commonly used on products that call for a strong "shelf appeal", such as household consumables, cigarette cartons, wine labels, and cosmetic packaging. It provides a metallic look on higher added-value label applications, primarily to enhance the appearance of the product.
