= Hobonichi =

Japanese company

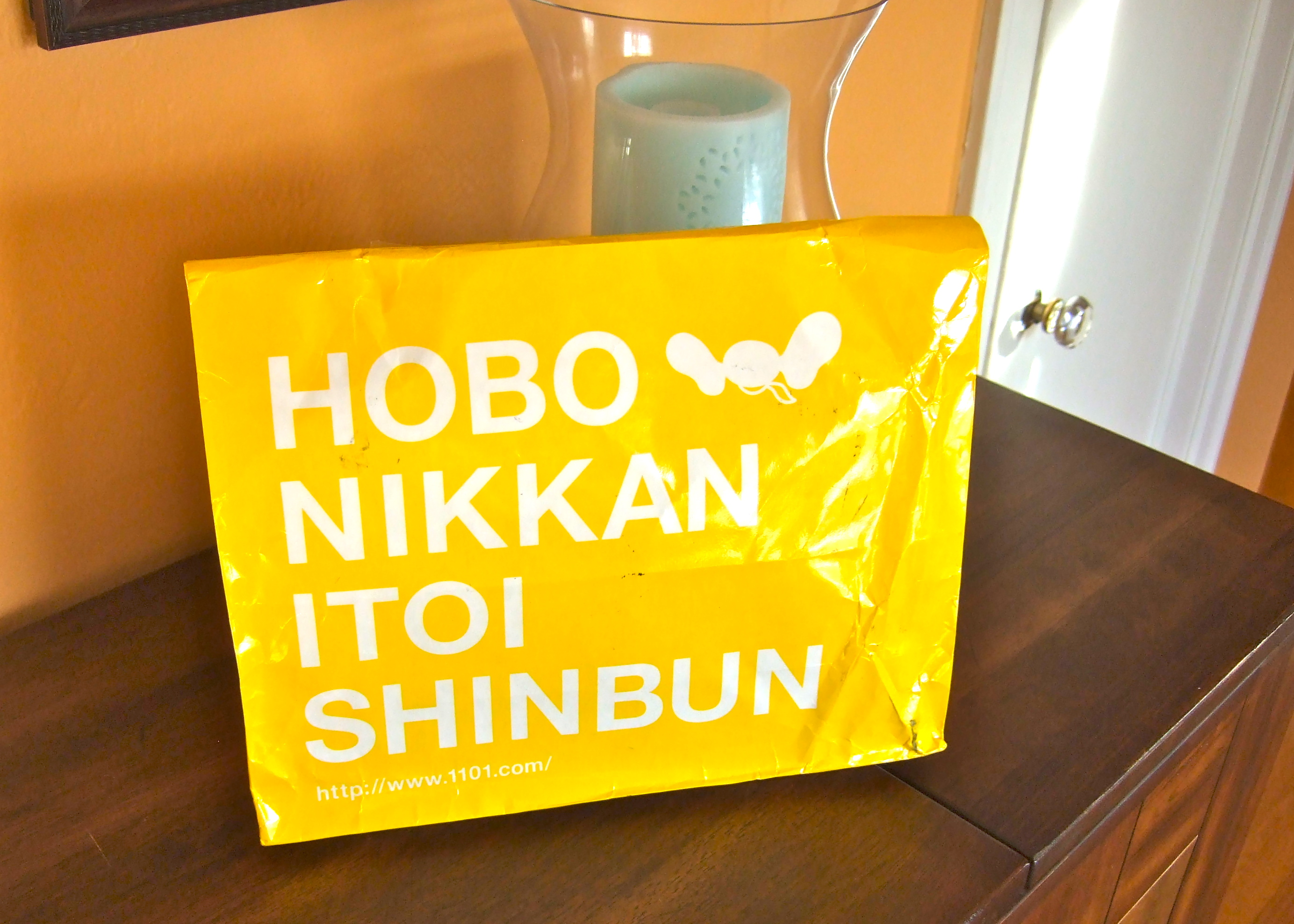
Hobo Nikkan Itoi Shinbun packaging

Hobo Nikkan Itoi Shinbun (ほぼ日刊イトイ新聞; lit. Almost Daily Itoi Newspaper), also known as Hobonichi (ほぼ日), is a Japanese company run by Hobonichi Co., Ltd. that designs and produces various daily life products such as T-shirts and notebooks. The company was founded by copywriter Shigesato Itoi (a.k.a. "Darling") on June 6, 1998, and it was originally his idea to call the site "Almost Daily" to give it more leeway, as he thought that daily updates would be too much mental pressure and content-wise, but since the site's launch at midnight (Bali time), some content has been updated every day. Originally started as Itoi's personal website, it has grown into one of the most profitable websites in Japan by focusing on sales of goods. In 2012, the website won the Porter Prize.

The site currently receives about 1.5 million page views a day, making it the largest personal website in Japan. Annual sales reached 3 billion yen in 2014, despite the fact that the company has not sold any membership-based paid content or advertising space to date.

== Today's Darling ==
A "sort of essay" written daily by Itoi himself that can be found on the top page. Since the opening of the site, he has continued to write every day without a break. One of the main features of the site is that the past essays written so far are not archived, and if they are not read that day, the data will be updated the next day. However, books containing past essays, etc. are available for purchase.

== Interviews ==
Itoi invites guests for conversations, and is visited by people from diverse industries. Some examples of people who have appeared in the past include: Sanma Akashiya, Hiroshi Aramata, Ichiro Suzuki, Hiromi Kawakami, Ryuichi Sakamoto, Momoko Sakura, Kinichi Hagimoto, Toshio Suzuki, Shuntarō Tanikawa, Tamori, Shōfukutei Tsurube II, Eikichi Yazawa, Hitoshi Matsumoto, Tatsunori Hara, Kiyoshi Nakahata, So Taguchi, Dai Tamesue, etc.

== Sales ==
The company develops and sells a wide range of merchandise in cooperation with major manufacturers, including T-shirts, calendars, bound notebooks, and clay pots. This is Hobonichi's main source of revenue. In particular, the original bound notebooks called Hobonichi Techo have become popular goods that have been perfected with the input of users since the early days of the site, and are still being sold as "evolving notebooks" with improvements made every year. In addition, a number of books born from the site's content have been published, and even a Hobonichi Credit Card was issued in cooperation with DC Card (currently no longer being issued). In addition, the company has collaborated with Nissin Foods and 7-Eleven to produce and sell an official Hobonichi cup noodle called Saru no Osekkai (サルのおせっかい; lit. Monkey's Nosiness).

== Treetop Secret Base ==
Hobonichi has a close relationship with Nintendo due to Itoi conceptualizing the Mother series of games, and has been running a series of articles on Nintendo called Treetop Secret Base (樹の上の秘密基地, Ki no ue no himitsu kichi) since its establishment. In 2006, Nintendo gave priority to providing information on Mother 3 to Hobonichi, and Hobonichi staff members were in charge of the pages on Nintendo's homepage.

In addition, the former president of Nintendo, Satoru Iwata, had a personal relationship with Itoi and held the title of "IT manager" at Hobonichi since its inception, and in 2007 was still the IT manager for the site despite also leading Nintendo. This was due to Iwata's great personal efforts as a partner in launching the website and making it online within Itoi's office (Iwata was working at HAL Laboratory when the website was launched). Conversations with Iwata and Shigeru Miyamoto were also held on a regular basis.

== Events ==
In addition to the development on the website, various events were also managed. Major events include a rakugo performance Kesennuma Samma Yose with Shinosuke Tatekawa, a baseball game at Tokyo Dome, and Hatarakitai Exhibition, a commemorative event for the 15th anniversary of the site's launch. The exhibition was held at Parco Museum in Shibuya from June 6 to 17, 2013, at Umeda Loft from December 28, 2013 to January 19, 2014, and at Fukuoka Parco from April 25 to May 11, 2014. In addition, Seikatsu no Tanoshimi Exhibition, a collection of products carefully selected by Hobonichi employees, was held at Roppongi Hills in March and November 2017, at Yebisu Garden Place in June 2018, at Hankyu Umeda Main Store in October of the same year, and at Marunouchi in April 2019.

On August 2, 2014, the company opened its directly managed store and gallery (event space), TOBICHI, near its headquarters, followed by its annex, TOBICHI 2, on February 22, 2015, and its western Japan base in Kyoto ("TOBICHI Kyoto") on June 6, 2017.

== Paper ==
Most Hobonichi planners use Tomoe River paper which is known to be thin but durable, resistant to bleed through, fountain‑pen friendly, and smooth and lightweight. The Original, Cousin, Day free use Tomoe River Paper, but Weeks and Weeks Mega uses a more lightweight variant of the Tomoe paper, it is slightly thinner because of the more compact nature of the hobonichi Weeks and Weeks Mega. The 5 Year Techo use a slightly thicker paper because of the long-term nature of the planner.

== Collaborations ==
Year	Collaborators
2018	Maaya Sakamoto; Space Brothers; Doraemon; Space Invaders; Rakuten Shopping Panda; Loft
2019	Maaya Sakamoto; Detective Conan; Watabe Wedding; Hankyu Umeda; Doraemon; Space Brothers; F1 News; Rilakkuma; Loft; Studio Chizu; Ketsumeishi; Space Invaders; Moomin; Pickles the Frog
2020	Maaya Sakamoto; Evangelion; Ketsumeishi; Watabe Wedding; Detective Conan; F1 Sokuho; NBC Radio Saga; GameCenter CX; Space Invaders; Pickles the Frog; Flower Companyz; Moomin; Monchhichi; Fujiko Museum
2021	Evangelion; F1 Sokuho; Maaya Sakamoto; Junichi Nakahara; New Japan Pro‑Wrestling; Fujiko Museum; GameCenter CX; Pickles the Frog; Moomin; Detective Conan
2022	Detective Conan; Maaya Sakamoto; Marunouchi 15‑chome Project; Toono OB/GYN; Osaki Computer Engineering Co., Ltd.; Jujutsu Kaisen 0; Biblia Koshodo no Jiken Techo; Fujiko Museum; F1 Sokuho; Demon Slayer: Kimetsu no Yaiba; GameCenter CX; Moomin; Pickles the Frog
2023	Detective Conan; Maaya Sakamoto; Marunouchi 15‑chome; Toono OB/GYN; F1 Sokuho; Pokémon Center; Moomin; Kanahei’s Small Animals; Fujiko‑F‑Fujio Museum; Osaki Computer Engineering Co., Ltd.
2024	Fujiko‑F‑Fujio Museum; Maaya Sakamoto; Moomin; Kanahei’s Small Animals; F1 Sokuho; Toono OB/GYN; Osaki Computer Engineering Co., Ltd.
2025	Godzilla; Fujiko‑F‑Fujio Museum; Maaya Sakamoto; Moomin; Kanahei’s Small Animals; F1 Sokuho; Toono OB/GYN
2026	Fujiko‑F‑Fujio Museum; Maaya Sakamoto; Kanahei’s Small Animals; Monchhichi; Pickles the Frog; F Soku; Toono OB/GYN
