= Knife (envelope) =

Knife is the cutting die for envelope or wrapper blanks. It is called a knife rather than a die because the latter is an object that makes an embossed printed impression of the stamp or indicium on the envelope. Traditionally, a knife would normally be made of forged steel. It was placed on a stack of paper with the sharp edge against the paper. The press head forced the cutting edge all the way through the stack of paper. The cut blanks were removed from the knife and the process was repeated. Not only could it cut out the odd shape of an envelope, but a knife could be used to cut out shapes of airmail stickers or gummed labels in the shape of stars or circles. The variety of shapes a knife could cut would be infinite.

In philately, Thorp knife numbers were and still are, used to indicate the height, width, shapes, and folds of envelopes generally numbered in the order of their discovery by collectors. The United Postal Stationery Society (UPSS) now has its own numbering system for envelope knives which is seeing more current use.
