= Advertising cover =

Postally used envelope with advertising

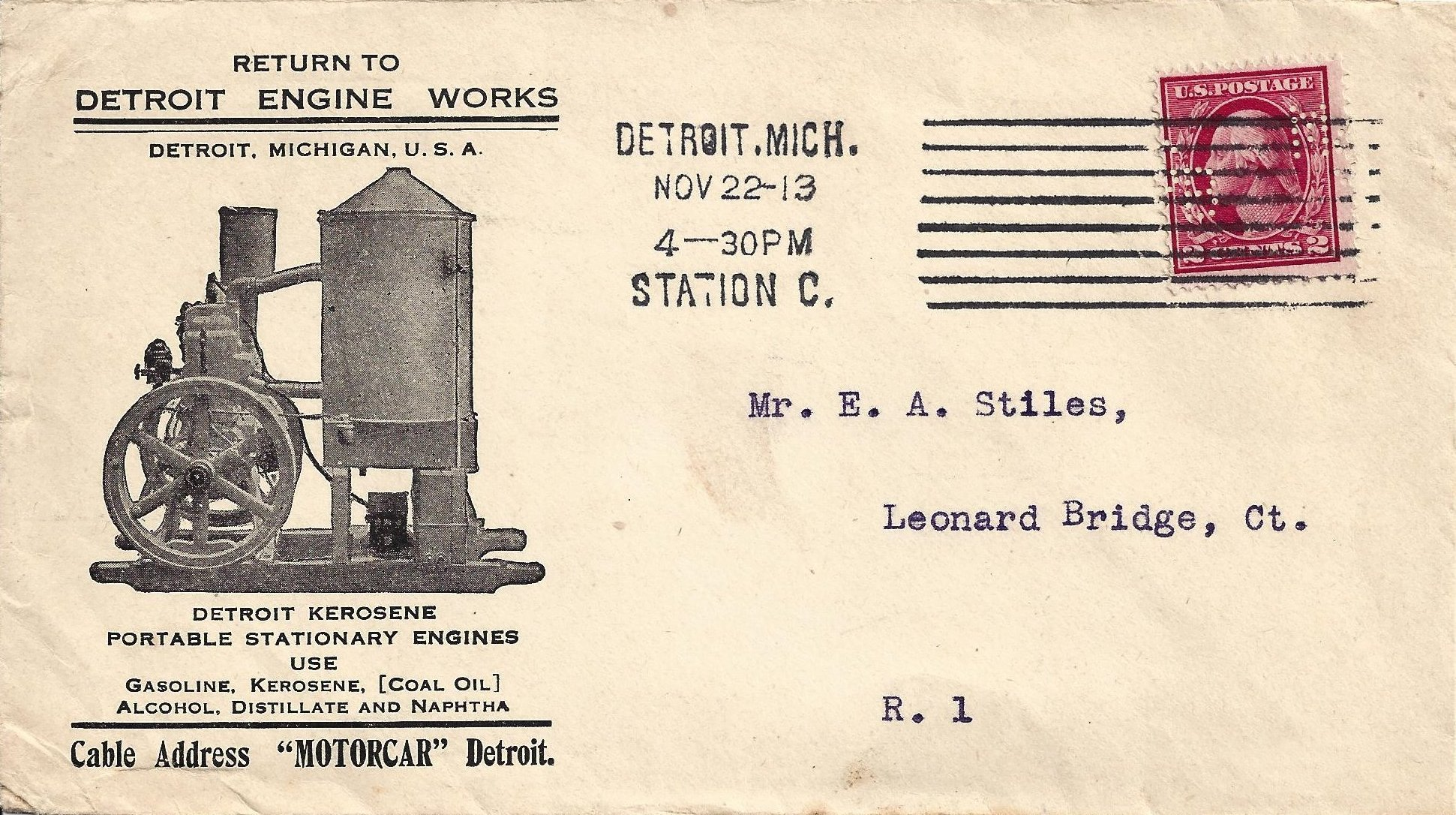
Detroit Engine Works cover showing an advertisement for its product.

Advertising cover in philately refers to a postally used envelope with advertisement for the products or services offered by a business or organization. In addition to the name and return address, the advertiser's text or illustration may appear on either the front or the back of the envelope.

== History ==
In the late 19th century, businesses added colorful illustrations to their envelopes to advertise their goods or services. Incorporating images, slogans, and promotional offers, advertising covers not only became examples of early direct mail marketing but also offered insights into the culture, commerce, and design of the period.

== See also ==
- Corner card
- Postal history
