= Sherborn Collection =

Stamp collection

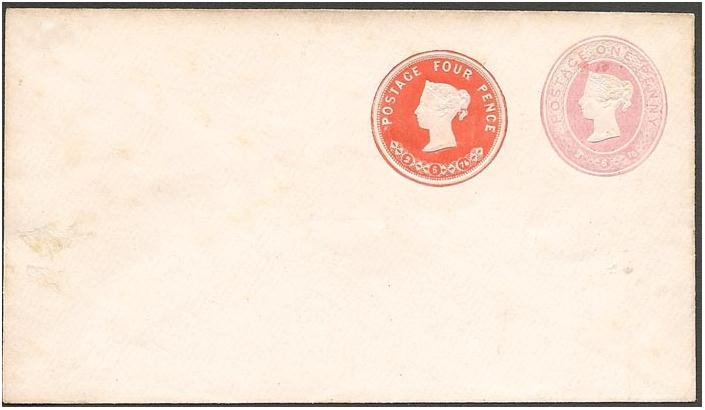
An 1876 1d stamped envelope with an additional 4d stamped-to-order imprinted stamp added to make the postage up to 5d. (Not from the Sherborn Collection).

The Sherborn Collection is a collection of 1841-85 Queen Victoria embossed 1d pink postal stationery stamped envelopes that forms part of the British Library Philatelic Collections. The collection was formed by C. Davis Sherborn and donated to the British Museum in 1913.
