= Hot stamping =

Method of relief printing

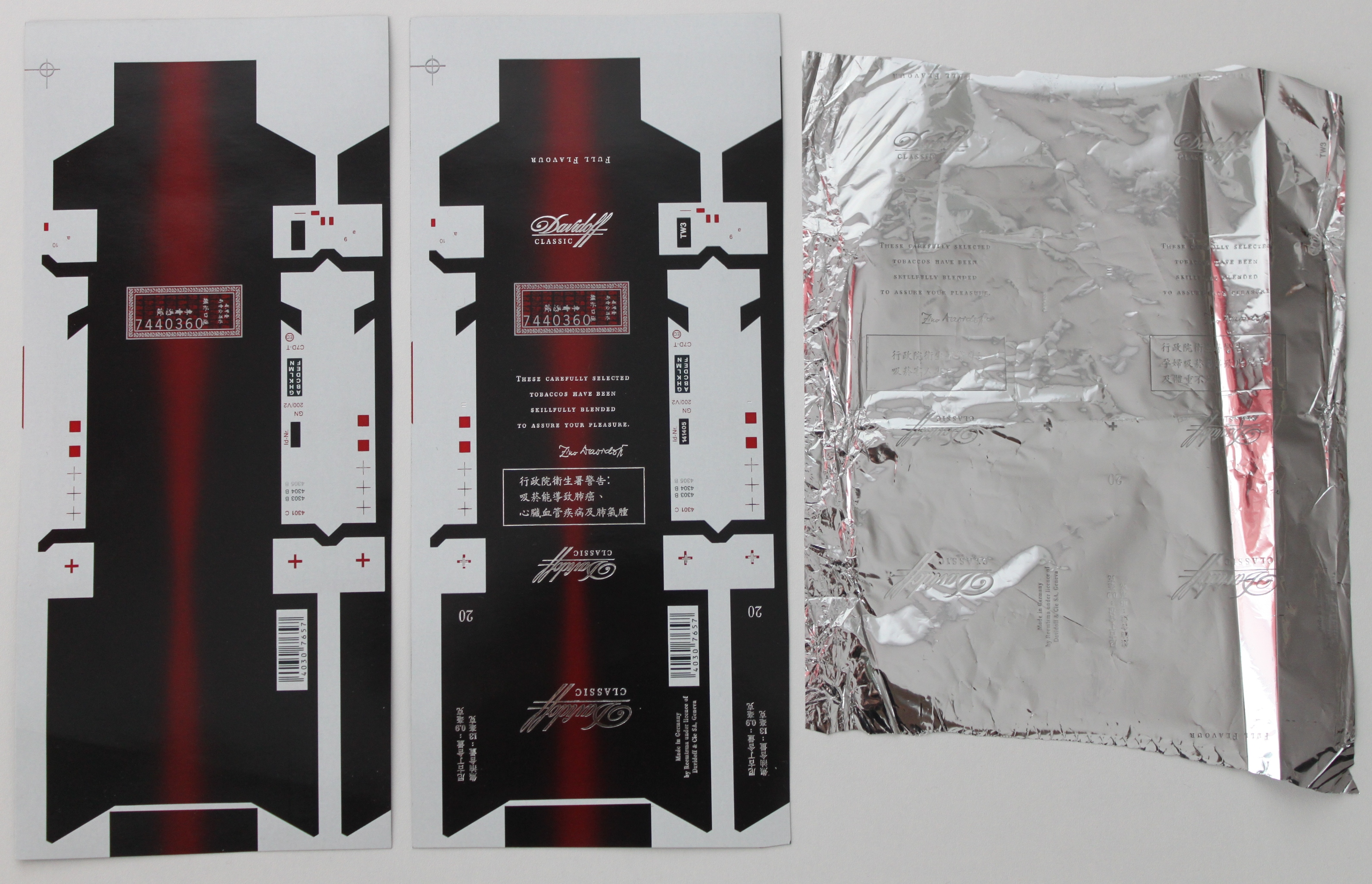
Package with hot stamping before (left) and after stamping (middle) with the foil after the stamping (right)

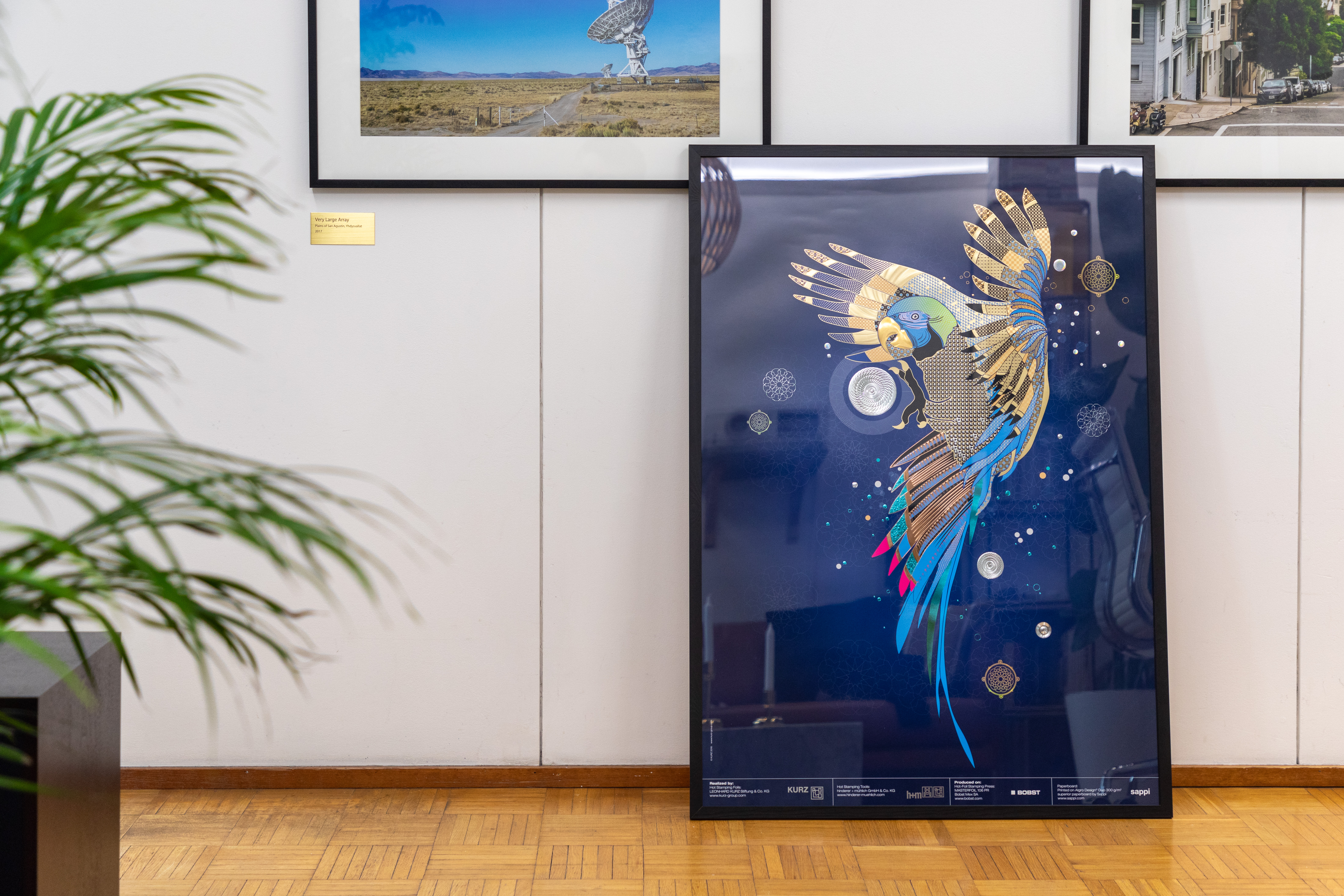
A sample from trade fair, where all the foil hot stamping know-how that was publicly available at the time was included.

Hot stamping or foil stamping is a printing method of relief printing in which pre-dried ink or foils are transferred to a surface at high temperatures. The method has diversified since its rise to prominence in the 19th century to include a variety of processes. After the 1970s, hot stamping became one of the most important methods of decoration on the surface of plastic products.

== Process ==
In a hot stamping machine, a die is mounted and heated, with the product to be stamped placed beneath it. A metallized or painted roll-leaf carrier is inserted between the two, and the die presses down through it. The dry paint or foil used is impressed into the surface of the product. The dye-stamping process itself is non-polluting because the materials involved are dry. Pressure and heat cause the relevant sections of the foil to become detached from the carrier material and become bonded with the printing surface.

== Tools ==
Along with foil stamping machines, among the commonly used tools in hot stamping are dies and foil. Dies may be made of metal or silicone rubber, and they may be shaped directly or cast. They can carry high levels of detail to be transferred to the surface and may be shaped to accommodate irregularities in the surface.

Foils are multilayered coatings that transfer to the surface of the product. Non-metallic foils consist of an adherence base, a color layer, and a release layer. Metallic foils replace the color layer with a layer of chrome or vacuum-metallized aluminum. Metallic foil construction has a metal-like sheen and is available in different metal shades such as gold, silver, bronze, and copper. Pigment foil does not have a metallic sheen but may be glossy or matte. Holographic foil paper includes a 3-dimensional image to provide a distinctive appearance to specific areas of a digitally printed application. Printing is often done on leather or paper.

Different hot stamping machines serve different purposes, but the most common hot stamping machines are simple up-and-down presses. Three of the most common brands are Kwikprint, Kingsley, and Howard. However, for more industrial applications Kluge and Heidelberg presses are more commonly used.

== Applications ==
Common applications include imprinted items and stationery such as business cards, greeting cards, labels, envelopes, presentation folders, postcards, book covers, and packaging such as folding cartons. The process can provide an eye-catching or luxury appearance. Eye-tracking studies have reported that foil-decorated packages can attract attention more quickly than otherwise identical designs.

Hot foil stamping is often combined with embossing ("combination emboss" or "foil embossing") to create raised metallic details.

For security applications, holographic hot-stamping foils are used as overt features on labels and identity documents; when hot-stamped, they form a tamper-evident transfer that cannot be removed without damaging the substrate. As of 1998, foil stamping was one of the most commonly used methods of security printing.

== History ==
In the 19th century, hot stamping became a popular method of applying gold tooling or embossing in book printing on leather and paper. The first patent for hot stamping was recorded in Germany by Ernst Oeser in 1892.

From the 1950s onward, the method became a popular means of marking plastic . Hot stamping technology for plastic parts is used in the appliance, automotive and consumer electronics industries.

Foil stamping can be used to make Radio-frequency identification (RFID) tags, although screen printing is faster and cheaper.

== See also ==
- Cold foil printing
- Pad printing
