= Stamped envelope =

Type of postal envelope

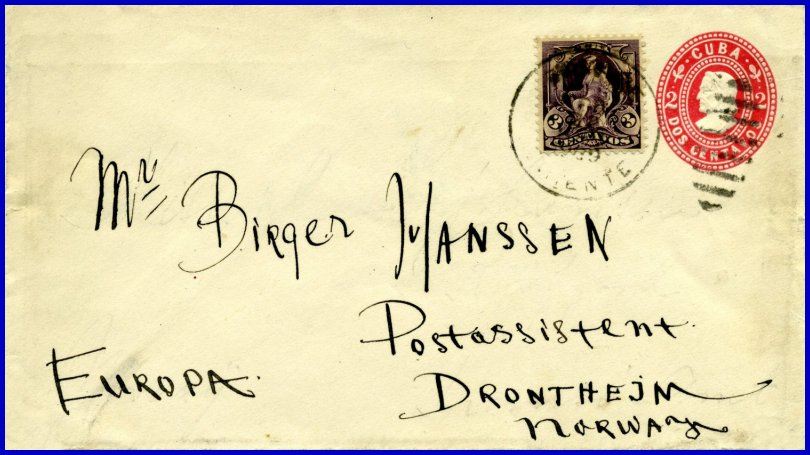
A 2 centavos stamped envelope with embossed Columbus indicium and 3c adhesive postage stamp from Cuba to Norway ca. 1904

A stamped envelope or postal stationery envelope (PSE) is an envelope with a printed or embossed indicium indicating the prepayment of postage. It is a form of postal stationery.

== United Kingdom ==
The Sherborn Collection in the British Library Philatelic Collections is an important collection of 1841-85 Queen Victoria embossed 1d pink stamped envelopes. The collection was formed by C. Davis Sherborn and donated to the British Museum in 1913.

== United States ==
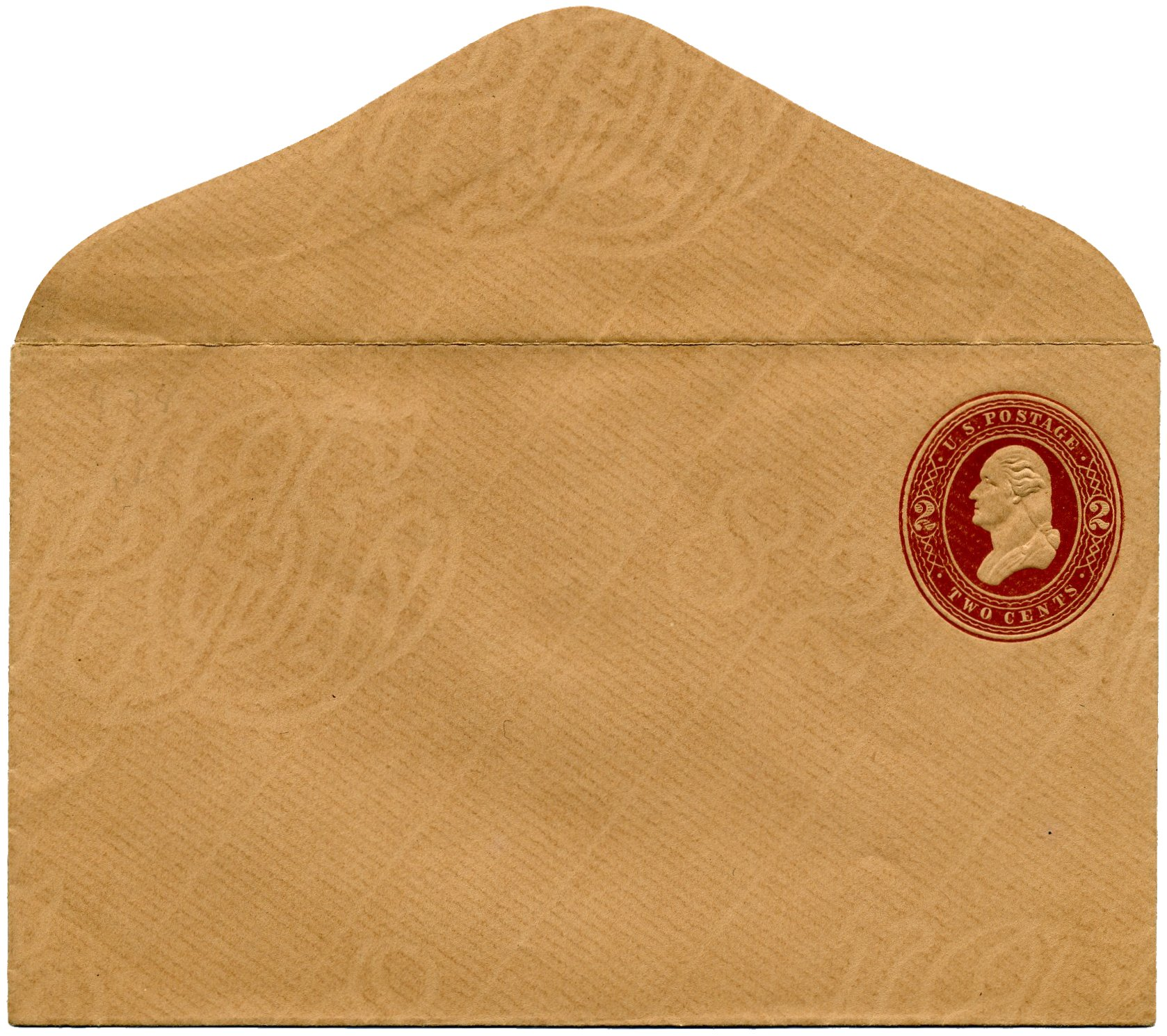
A fawn colored, UPSS size 7, watermark 6, laid paper, US postal stationery envelope from the Plimpton series of 1883.

In August 1852, an Act of the US Congress authorized the Postmaster General to provide "suitable letter envelopes with such watermarks or other guards against counterfeits... with the addition of the value or denomination of the postage stamps so printed or impressed thereon...." The first result was the 1853 Nesbitt issues of stamped envelopes, which was named after the private contractor who produced them for the government. When the different envelope sizes, knives, colors, dies to print the indicia, and denominations are combined, there are literally thousands of different stamped envelopes produced for the US.

== Collecting ==
Collectors of stamped envelopes use a catalog to know what has been issued.

Siegfried Ascher was the first to try to comprehensively document all countries' postal stationery including stamped envelopes. This was followed some 40 years later by the Higgins & Gage World Postal Stationery Catalog. Though now out of date, it is still frequently cited since it covers all countries and no other comprehensive catalog has been attempted since. The H&G catalog, as it is known, describes stamped envelopes by the envelope size, the depicted indicia and its valuations, some corner cards, while sometimes disregarding envelope color.

The Scott catalogue is the United States envelope color and value of the indicia which is perfect for dealing with cut squares, but falls short of information needed to collect entires, i.e. the whole envelope. The United Postal Stationery Society has two published books cataloging U.S. stamped envelopes. These books describe all of the other stated criteria plus the envelope knife making them the most complete U.S. stamped envelope catalogs.

British postal stationery to 1970 has been comprehensively documented and Edifil is a Spanish company that has comprehensive listings for stamped envelopes of Spain, Cuba, Philippines and Puerto Rico.

Australian Postal Stationery is covered by a catalogue from Brusden White. The 'Australian Commonwealth Specialists' Catalogue: Postal Stationery including Australian Territories' was first issued in 2013. In 2018 a fully revised 2nd edition was released. Fully illustrated, it is the most comprehensive reference work for these Australian issues.

Most stamped envelopes are collected as entires. In the 19th century the practice was to collect cut squares (or cut-outs in the U.K.) which involved cutting the embossed indicia from a postal envelope. This destroyed the envelope. As a result, one cannot tell from a cut square what specific envelope it came from and, many times, the cancellation information. The manner in which the stamped envelope is cut before folding (that is, its knife) vanishes on a cut square. The envelope size disappears, too, with a cut square.

In collecting entires, a single indicium may appear on many different sizes of envelopes. Some countries have issued the same indicium on different paper types: laid and wove. Likewise it is common for the same indicium to be embossed onto paper of several different colors. Finally, two envelopes of the same size can have a different flap size indicating that they were cut from a different knife. Rarely, an uncatalogued color, or displaced surcharge, or albino indicium, or inside-out folding of the envelope may appear, in which case you have found something of value. All of these attributes relate to mint or unused envelopes. When you add a postmark from a used envelope to the mix, the collecting possibilities explode. What was formerly in fashion, collecting only mint examples, has changed because many collectors seem to find used PSE collections more interesting.

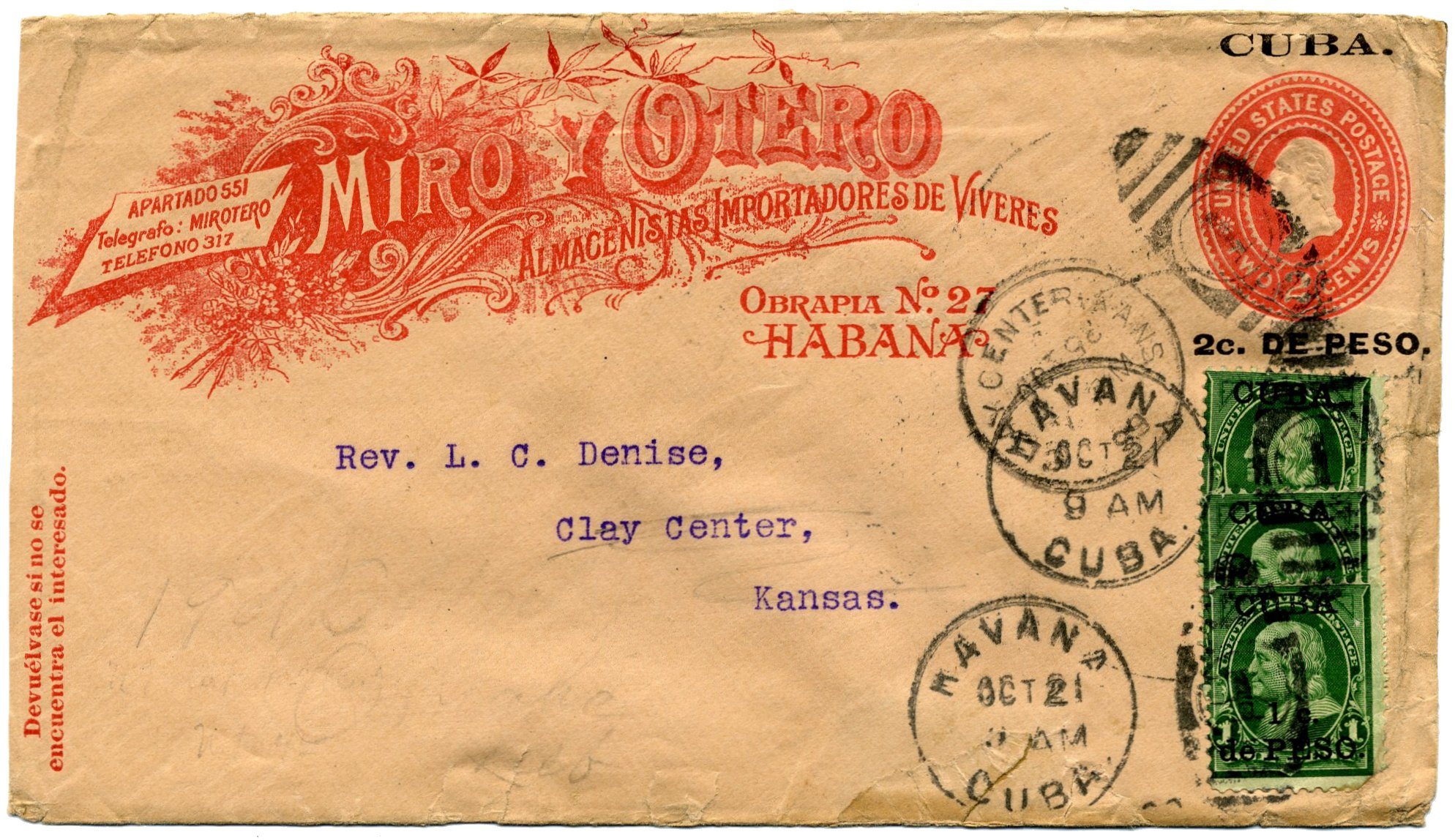
1899 postal stationery envelope with an imprinted special request corner card of Miro y Otero from U.S. occupied Cuba.

Some postal stationery envelopes contain a corner card, a printed return address on the envelope, usually in the upper left hand corner. This can range from a simple town and country notation to an elaborate illustrated advertisement for a business. Corner cards are either applied by an after-market print shop or by dealing with the government related entity that produces the stamped envelopes.

== See also ==
- Illustrated stamped envelope
