= Treasury tag =

Type of stationery/fastener

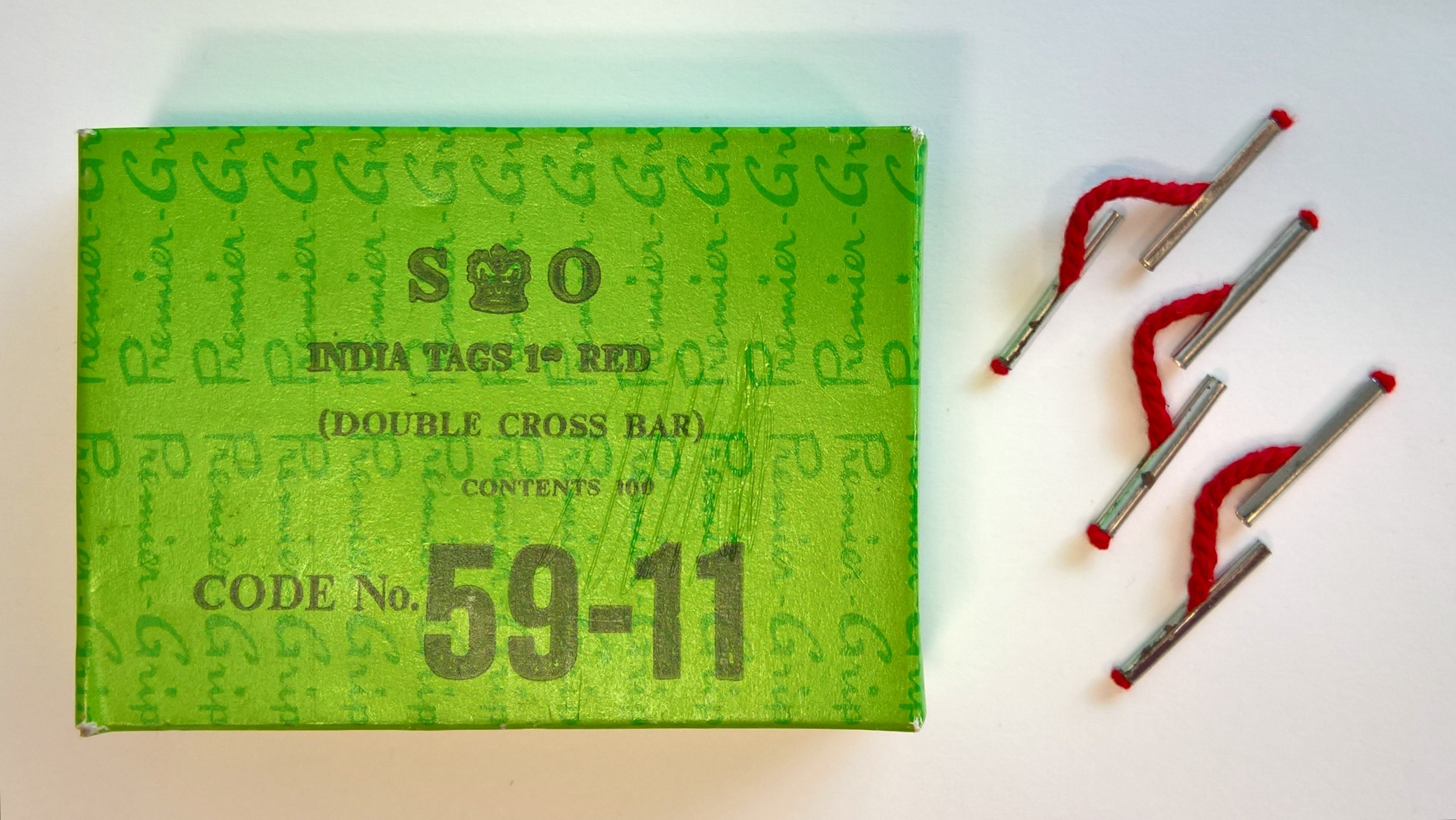
A box of HMSO India tags, now also known as Treasury tags

A treasury tag, India tag, or string tag is an item of stationery used to fasten sheets of paper together or to a folder. It consists of a short length of string, with metal or plastic cross-pieces at each end that are orthogonal to the string. They are threaded through holes in paper or card made with a hole punch or lawyers bodkin or electric drill, and the cross-pieces are sufficiently wide as to not slip back through the holes.

The names Treasury tag and India tag are first found on record in a list of stationery items published by His Majesty's Stationery Office (HMSO) in 1912, and, both being capitalised, probably refer to HM Treasury and the India Office. While the terms are now equivalent, a Treasury tag was originally a lace with a sharp metal tag at one end, which could be threaded through the holes in a stack of documents or cards and inserted into a corresponding tag at the other end, thus forming a loop and binding the documents. The tags, in that case, were in line with the string, similar to aglets on a shoelace.
