= TouchNote =

- Type: Mobile application
- Founded: 2008
- Headquarters: London, United Kingdom
- Key people: Raam Thakrar (Founder)
- Products: iOS, Android
- Website: touchnote.com

TouchNote is a mobile app for smartphones, tablets and website for sending printed, personalized postcards, greeting cards, other photo products as well as gifts.

TouchNote was one of the first subscription card sending services. It operates in the $15B worldwide cards and photo merchandise market. It was ranked as one of Europe's fastest growing tech companies in the Financial Times 1000 (2018).

The company is privately funded and based in London and New York. The Android and iOS apps and website are regularly updated with new features.

TouchNote was first launched in 2008 and is based in London.

== Company profile ==
The company was founded by Raam Thakrar and Paul Burdin in 2008, and was launched to the public in November 2008. The TouchNote apps and website convert users' photos into postcards, greeting cards, and other photo products, which are printed and posted by TouchNote on behalf of the user.

== TouchNote cards ==
The TouchNote app and website allows users to send personalised postcards, greeting cards, framed photos, photo canvases and boxes of prints using their own photos. Orders are sent anywhere in the world with a functioning postal system, but are printed and posted from print centres based in the UK, USA, Germany and Australia.

In March 2009, TouchNote released an API which allowed other sites to integrate into their print on demand system. This included photos from Facebook and from Picasa. This API has since been discontinued.

== Mobile applications ==
In May 2009, the company released an application on the Nokia OVI store which allowed users to use photos on their phone to make cards. It was the first application on the OVI store which produced a physical product. The app was voted the must-have entertainment app of 2010 by Ovi users.

The company first released an iPhone application in September 2009 with similar functionality.

In June 2010, an Android application was released with similar functionality.

In October 2010, a Windows Phone 7 app was launched. This included additional features such as photo crop and zoom and ability for users to sign their cards. The Windows Phone 7 app is no longer supported by TouchNote.

== Data breach ==
On 4 November 2015, TouchNote had a data breach in which some customer names, email addresses, order histories and home addresses were stolen. In their official statement on 5 November, the company also confirmed that some dates of birth had been accessed, along with some card recipient's names and postal addresses.
