= Black Astrum =

Company in the United Kingdom

Black Astrum is an English business card manufacturer based in London and Berkshire. The company specialises in made to order diamond-encrusted business and member cards, supplying them across Europe, the Middle East and Asia. The company offers its signature cards on a strict invitation-only basis with each card custom designed according to customers' specifications. The product has been included in Tatler magazine's 'Object of Desire' and Millionaire Asia's 'Must have item for men'.

== The signature card ==
Black Astrum's signature cards are made out of Swiss Hesa-Glas with scratch and chemical resilient coating. Each card is rumored to cost around $1,500, with pricing dependent on the number of diamonds encrusted on each card.

== History ==
Black Astrum originally started as a result of a one-off request from a wealthy Middle Eastern family. The founder of the company Sufian Khawaja, pleased with the final design, decided to launch Black Astrum officially in 2011 and sell the cards to a select, wealthy few. Khawaja himself has a background in design and engineering and resides in the county of Berkshire, England.
