= Hobonichi Techo =

Japanese daily planner by Hobo Nikkai Itoi Shinbun

The Hobonichi Techo (ほぼ日手帳, Hobonichi Techō) is a popular Japanese brand of notebook/daily planner manufactured by Hobo Nikkan Itoi Shinbun, also known as Hobonichi (ほぼ日). These planners come in a variety of sizes, layouts, and intended uses. Most are printed on Tomoe River paper.

== Types ==
Planner	Size	Layout	Ideal Use	Key Features
Hobonichi Techo Original	A6	Daily	Journaling, Planning	Quotes, One page per day
Hobonichi Techo Cousin	A5	Daily, Weekly, Monthly	Journaling, Planning	Large pages, Weekly vertical Layouts
Hobonichi Weeks	Slim, wallet size, portable	Weekly, Monthly, Blank	Journaling, Planning	One page per week, Quotes, Note pages
Hobonichi Weeks Mega	thicker than Weeks, more note/open pages	Weekly, Monthly, Blank	Journaling, Planning, Note Taking	Same as week, More note pages
Hobonichi Day Free	A6 or A5	Monthly, Blank	Flexible	Monthly calendar, Free graph pages
Hobonichi 5 Year Techno	A6 or A5	5 Year Journal/Planner	Memory keeping, Long Term Planning	Each spread shows the same date across 5 Years

=== HON planners ===
Starting with the 2023 planner year, Hobonichi began offering their A5 Cousin and A6 original planners in a HON version. These versions have thicker, cardboard covers with preprinted designs and the inclusion of 2 ribbon bookmarks and a pencil board. These HON planners are meant to be used as an all-in-one package, as opposed to the traditional planners which are meant to be paired with one of Hobonichi's covers (sold separately) to protect the book and provide pockets, a pen loop, and ribbon bookmarks.

== English-language version ==
In 2013, Hobonichi collaborated with designer brand ARTS&SCIENCE to release an English-language version of the planner for the first time. The English planner was originally available only in A6 size, differentiated by a black cover with gold stamped Japanese characters for “planner”, Techō (手帳), and the ARTS&SCIENCE logo, as opposed to the cream cover of the Japanese version. The planner year 2023 was the first year Hobonichi began offering their traditional Japanese-only layout with the cream cover in an English printed version in addition to the existing ARTS&SCIENCE English planner. This English printed version is also now available for the A5 Cousin size and the Weeks and Weeks Mega planners. The Avec versions of the planners where the year is split between two books, remain Japanese only.

== See also ==
- Calendrical Notes (暦注)
