= Theophilus Johnson =

English entomologist and artist

Theophilus Johnson (23 August 1836 – 1919), also known as Theo Johnson, was an English amateur naturalist, artist and publisher.

== Biography ==
Johnson was born on 23 August 1836 at Tottenham in Middlesex, the third son of George Johnson, a well-to-do wax refiner from the City and his wife, Ann, daughter of John Josse of Spitalfields. He was the grand-uncle of Laurence Bertrand Johnson, the good friend of C. S. Lewis. Theo was apprenticed as a stationer and printer, eventually starting his own letterpress printing business.

He married Mary Helena Douglas in 1866 and they had three children - Helena Stuart Johnson, Paterson Herbert Johnson and Constance Mabel Johnson. (Sources: copy marriage and birth certificates from GRO)

He probably lived most of his life near Regent's Park as he seems to have spent most of his time visiting the Gardens of the Zoological Society of London and producing beautiful watercolour paintings of the exhibits. These he published as original works of art, along with printed or hand-written text, in a large number of books.

His special interest was entomology, but he also published works on molluscs, birds and mammals, including extinct ones. Perhaps of most interest was his Personal Recollections of the [London] Zoo during a Period of Fifty Years (1908). This was the "first accurate history of the Zoo" and included never before published information concerning the "true story of Jumbo", the "fiasco of the white elephant" and the "fiction of the intellectually-gifted chimpanzee, Sally".

In later life, he lived at Dartford Heath in Kent where he continued to publish until his death in 1919. Twenty-nine of his books are owned by the Natural History Museum, four by the Zoological Society and a few others by important institutions. However, most are in private hands.
