= Triart Design Marker =

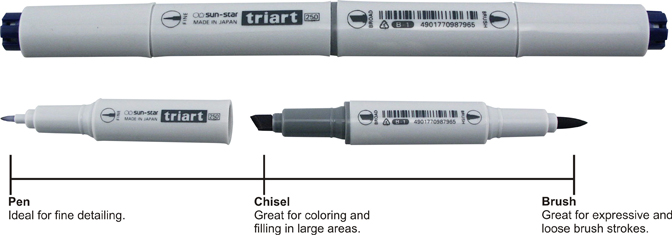
- Current owner: Sun-Star Stationery

Triart Design Markers is a brand of marker made in Japan by Sun-Star Stationery Co., Ltd. The markers are available in 150 colors and are refillable. TRIART markers feature a refillable three-nibbed marker design. This design combines a broad nib, a fine nib, and a brush nib.

TRIART markers are an alcohol based marker, which allows for quicker dry time and less bleed. The 150 colors are color-coded for convenience. Colors come contain Cool Grays, Warm Grays, Luminous, Skin Tone, Earth Tone, Red Tone, Pink Tone, Orange Tone, Yellow Tone, Green Tone, Blue Green Tone, Blue Tone and Violet Tone.

The 7cc refill bottles can refill a marker up to five times. Accessories include refillable nibs and a nib picker for removing and replacing nibs.
