= Uncooked =

American greeting card company

Uncooked, Inc.
- Industry: greeting cards, animations
- Founded: 2004; 22 years ago
- Founder: Nat and Armand
- Defunct: 2022; 4 years ago
- Headquarters: New York, NY
- Website: http://www.uncookedland.com

Uncooked was a New York-based company most notable for their snarky and strange greeting cards. Founders and creators Natalie Carbone and Armand Prisco started the company in 2004 after quitting their jobs in advertising. In 2006, they helped create a new brand image for MTV. They also created a few animated spots that aired during the 2006 MTV Video Music Awards.

In 2011, Carbone and Prisco pitched an animated series based on the greeting cards titled Uncookedland to The Walt Disney Company. It never made it past the pilot.

In 2007, Kelly Ripa expressed her love of the cards by handing out cards to celebrity guests Vince Vaughn and Anderson Cooper during their interviews on Live with Regis and Kelly. In 2008, gossip columnist Perez Hilton featured an animated version of one of their holiday greetings cards.

In July 2022, Uncooked announced a "Farewell Tour" on its Facebook page and closed soon after.
