= Royal Mail rubber band =

Elastic loop used by the British postal service

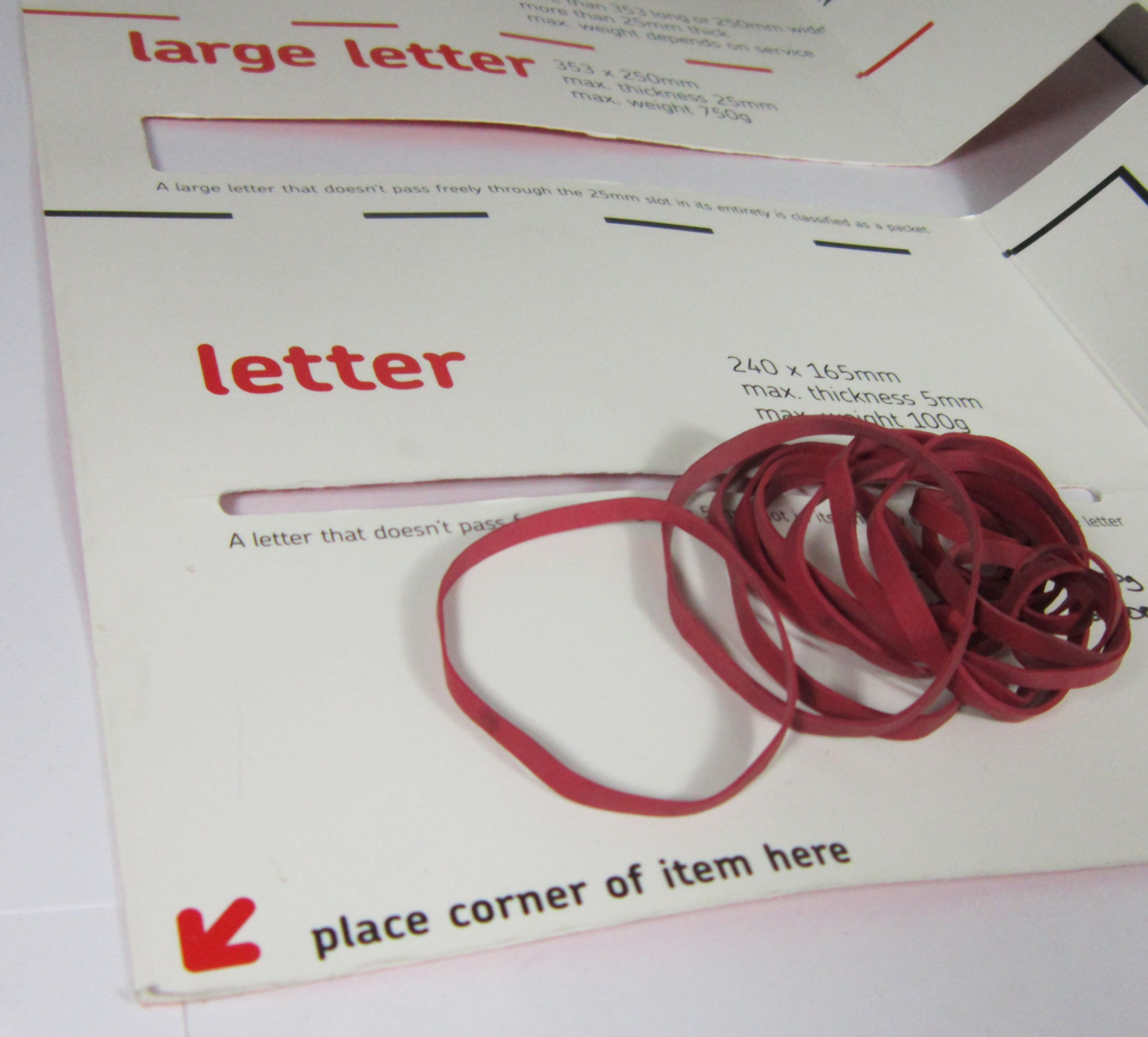
About 10 Royal Mail rubber bands, on top of a letter size guide

A Royal Mail rubber band is a small red elastic loop used by the postal delivery service in the United Kingdom. In the course of its work, the Royal Mail consumes nearly one billion rubber bands per year to tie together bundles of letters at sorting offices. In the 2000s, complaints about Royal Mail rubber bands littering the streets of Britain gave rise to ongoing press interest in this minor cultural phenomenon.

== Volume ==
In a response to a Freedom of Information Act request made by Steve Woods to the Royal Mail in December 2008, the company disclosed that it used the following numbers of rubber bands in each of the three years from 2005/6 to 2007/8:

- 2005–6 – 753,480,000
- 2006–7 – 825,750,000
- 2007–8 – 871,695,000
- 2009–10 – 760,000,000

According to the Daily Record, costs for rubber bands in the 2007–08 period were £982,677. Figures obtained by The Daily Telegraph showed that between 2007 and 2011, spending on rubber bands increased by 40%. In 2009–2010, the numbers used equated to one rubber band being used for every 28 letters that the Royal Mail delivered.

== Complaints ==
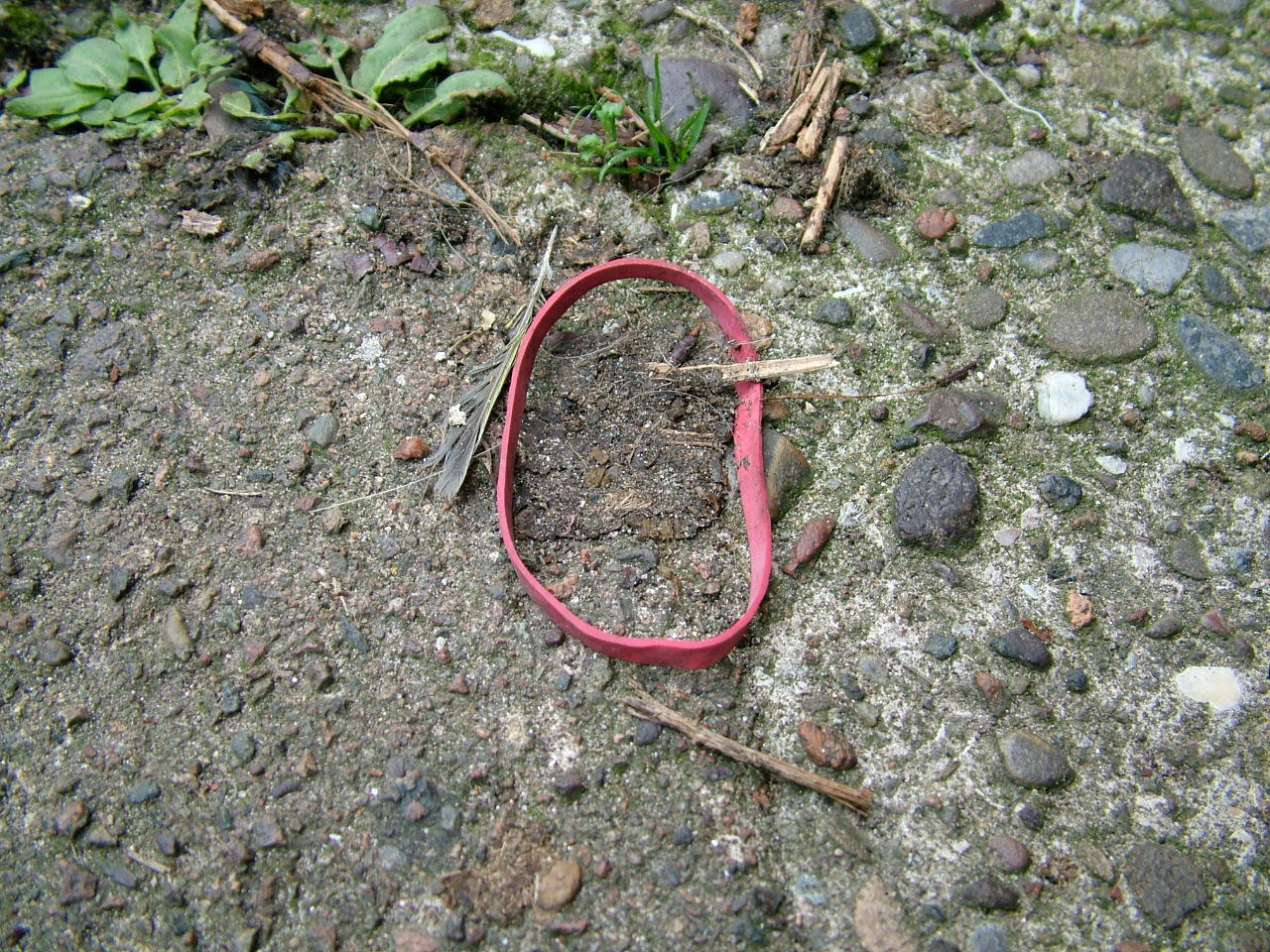
Royal Mail rubber band discarded in Alnmouth, 2009

Complaint and comment on the theme of discarded rubber bands is a recurring focus of media interest. A Times story in 2006—"Posties' red rubber bands stretch public's patience"—is fairly typical. It notes a campaign by the London Borough of Lewisham's mayor, who complains that an estimated 5,000 bands are dropped in his borough each month; it details the response to a November 2005 BBC Radio Essex programme in which listeners were asked to send in found rubber bands - allegedly 10,000 were received; and it makes a range of more or less whimsical suggestions for the re-use of such bands—as rubber balls, "chopsticks for butterfingers", and rubber band tanks. Lewisham's campaign was picked up by a number of other news outlets, such as the BBC. The story resurfaces from time to time, independently of specific campaigns.

At least one report of injury to wildlife has been presumed because of Royal Mail rubber bands, in the case of a duck observed with a rubber band wrapped around its head. Cases of hedgehogs dying from their contact with rubber bands have been reported, with fatalities being caused by the objects sticking to the animal and the creature's flesh becoming enmeshed with it over time.

== Campaign ==
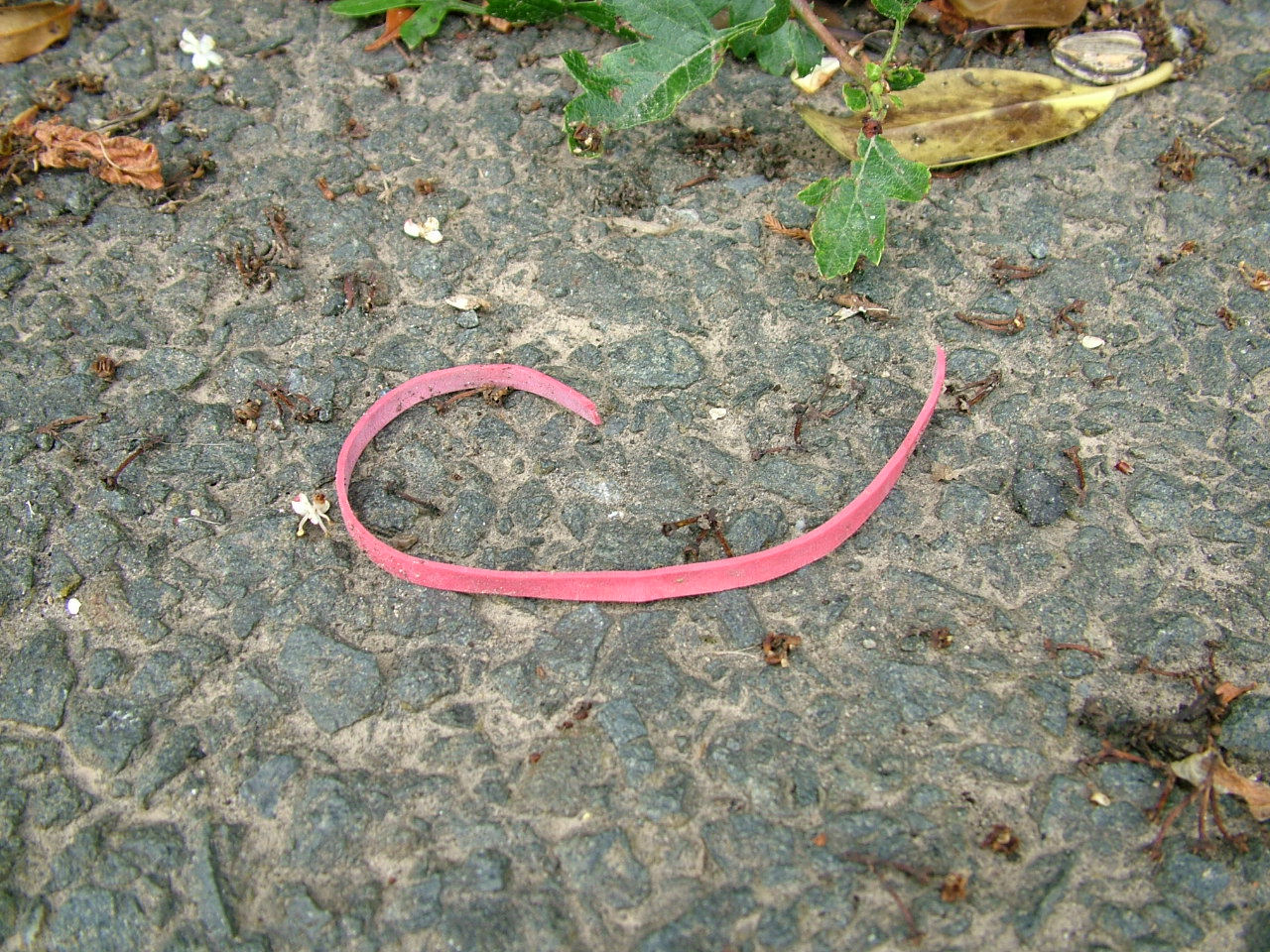
Fragment of a Royal Mail rubber band discarded in Bilton, 2009

In April 2009, the Keep Britain Tidy campaign has involved itself in the issue as part of its Big Tidy Up campaign, and returned some 13,000 bands that had been collected by the public to the Royal Mail. The campaign, together with a similar initiative by the Keep Scotland Beautiful organisation, once again raised the profile of the issue, gaining coverage by the press.

== Royal Mail response ==
The Royal Mail emphasises that it instructs staff to re-use and not to abandon rubber bands, and that in mid-2004 it changed the colour of bands used from brown to red so that they are easier to spot and retrieve. In 2009 Royal Mail stated that neither the company, nor to its knowledge any staff, had ever been fined for rubber band littering; and that the red rubber bands they were then using were designed to be more biodegradable than previously used brown bands, so as to lessen the environmental impact. Finally, the company stated that it was seeking to redesign certain processes to diminish the use of bands.

In July 2021, news outlets reported an update from one of Royal Mail's Twitter accounts telling customers they could return rubber bands by putting them in postboxes, although the tweet has since been deleted.

== Cultural phenomenon ==
The UK press exhibits a fascination with the whimsical side of the issue: what to do with discarded bands. The Guardian newspaper went as far as to dedicate an editorial column to the subject. More frequently the media solicits and presents lists of suggestions, with BBC Radio 4's PM programme including suggestions of guitar strings, chopping board stabilisers and handlebar fasteners.

Less frequently, papers discuss whether postmen or the Royal Mail should be fined for littering; the Keep Britain Tidy campaign group has suggested that environmental protection laws should be used to levy on-the-spot fines of £80 for dropping litter, with the penalty rising to £2,500 if the case goes to court.
