= Lawyers bodkin =

Stationery tool

A lawyers bodkin or ribbon threader is a tool used in work with stationery. It is used to bore holes in paper documents so that a connector such as legal tape, a treasury tag or a brass fastener can be threaded through the hole in the documents to bind them together. A lawyers bodkin is similar to a stitching awl: it consists of a pointed metal shaft with an eyelet near the pointed end connected to a bulb-shaped wooden handle; the shaft is kept attached to the handle by a ferrule.
