= Corner card =

Envelope with printed return address

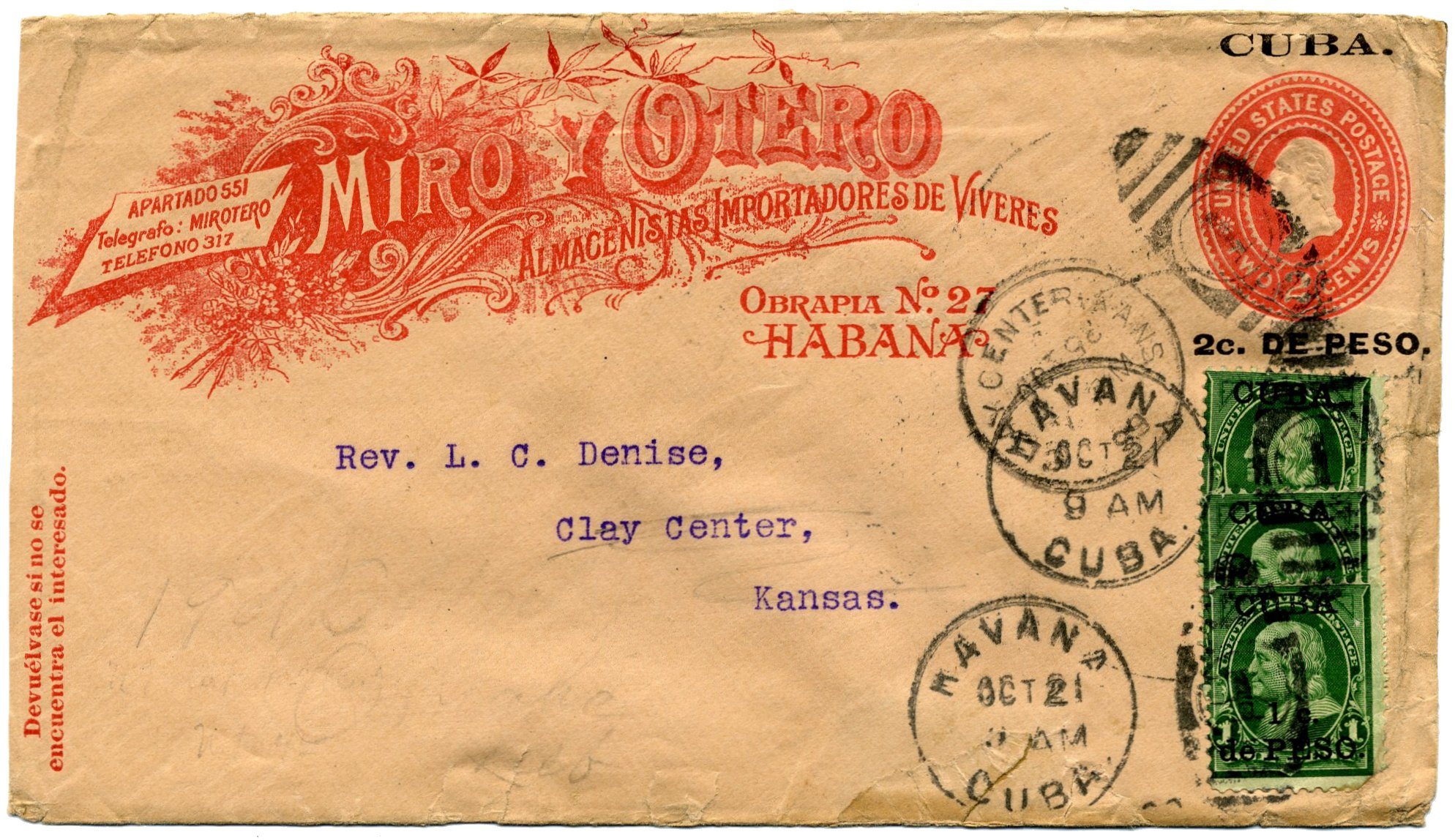
1899 postal stationery envelope from U.S. occupied Cuba with an imprinted special request corner card of Miro y Otero.

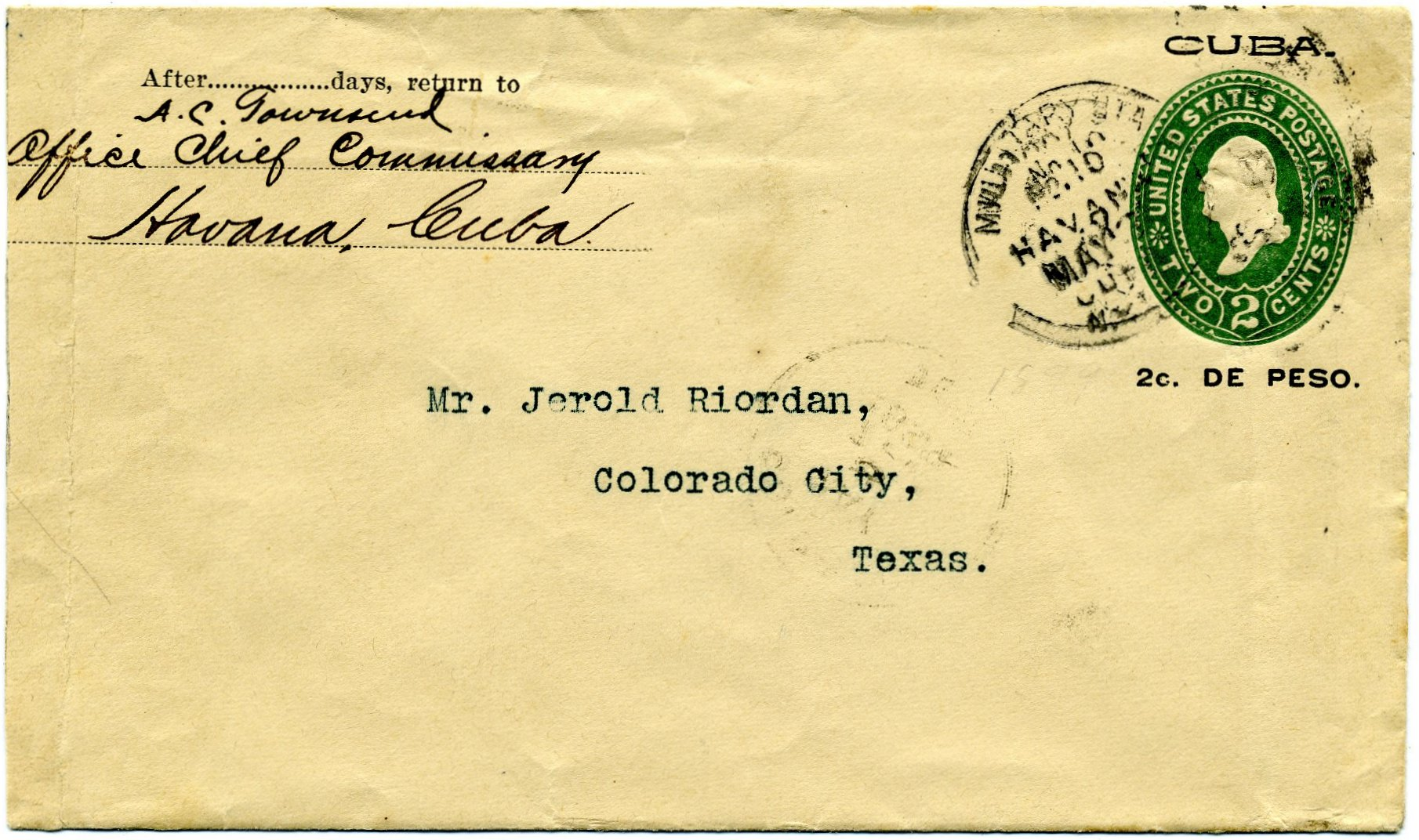
1899 postal stationery envelope from U.S. occupied Cuba with an imprinted partial request corner card.

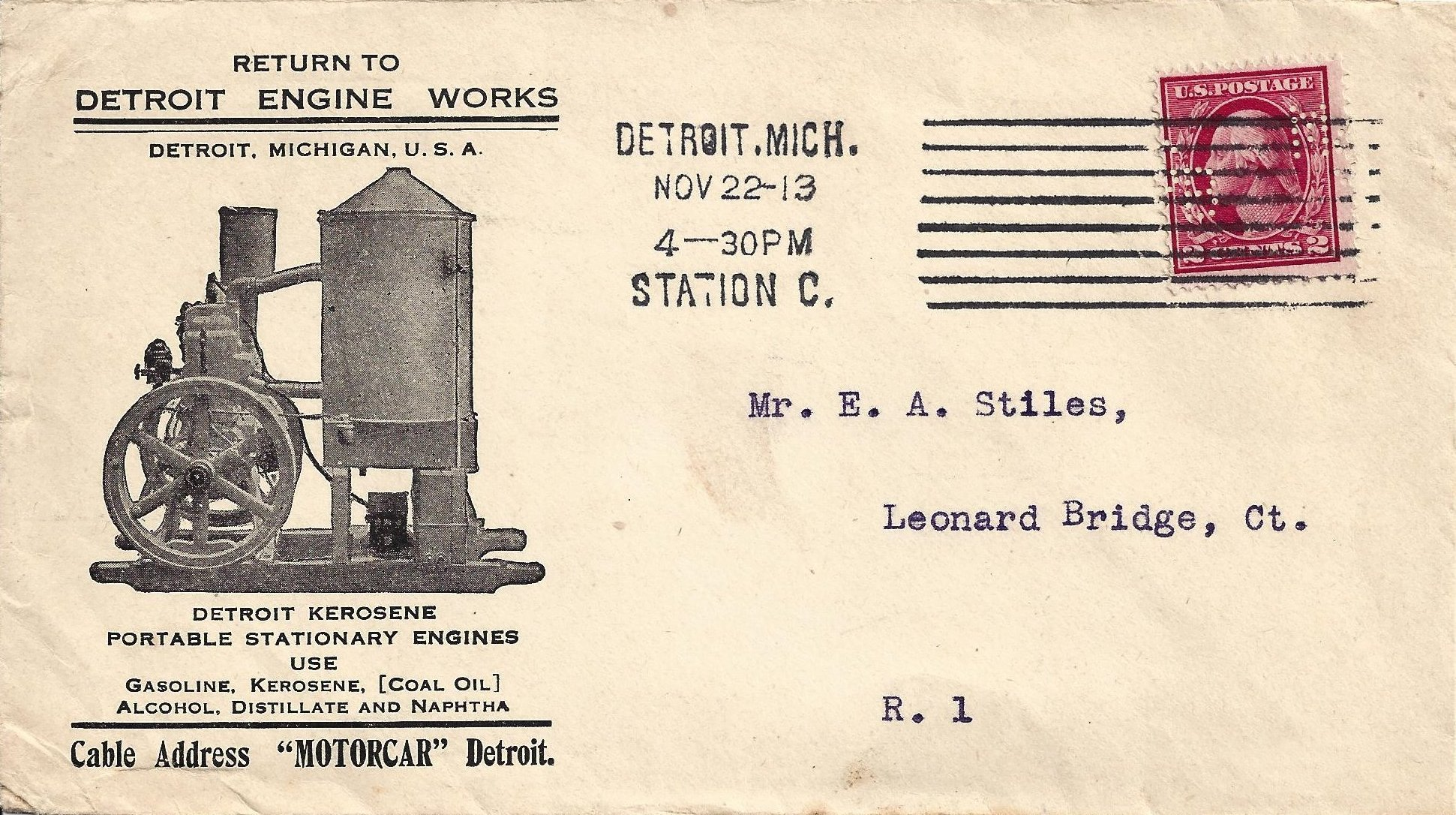
Detroit Engine Works envelope showing not only the standard name and address in the corner card, but also a fancy advertisement with a photograph of one of its products.

The term corner card means the wording, sometimes with a pictorial feature, in the upper left hand corner of a postal stationery envelope or an envelope designed to have regular adhesive stamps affixed to it. It is there for the purpose of stating the sender's return address to facilitate the return of undeliverable mail.

== Classification ==
There are four general classifications of corner cards:

- Partial request corner cards are a mere outline, letting the sender fill in the number of days for an undelivered envelope to remain before return plus the sender's entire name and address, e.g. "After __ days, return to ...";
- General request corner cards have the printed name of the state or possession, e.g. "Philippine Islands";
- Post Office request corner cards have the printed specific name of the post office, e.g. "Cristobal, Canal Zone";
- Special request corner cards have the full name and address of the sender. These were used by commercial concerns with a large volume of correspondence. They would normally be ordered in multiples of 500.

== See also ==
- Advertising cover
- Postcard
- Trade card
- Trading cards
