= United Postal Stationery Society =

United States organization

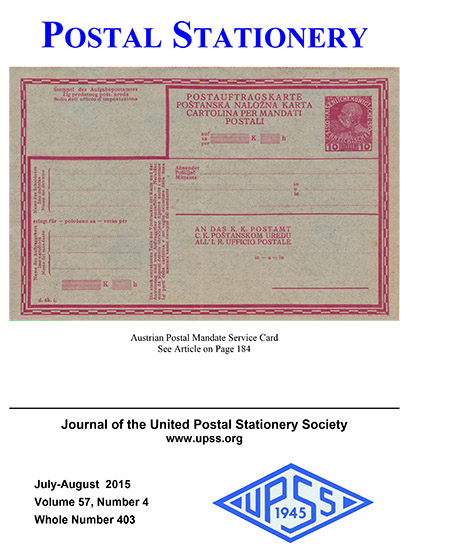
United Postal Stationery Society (UPSS), July-August 2015

The United Postal Stationery Society (UPSS) was formed July 1, 1945 from the merger of the Postal Card Society of America, in existence since 1891, and the International Postal Stationery Society, founded 1939. Current membership stands at about 1,000. The organization's journal since 1949 is called Postal Stationery. Articles appear about new issues of U.S. and international postal stationery, plus articles on rare and unusual stationery.

The Society has been active in producing postal stationery publications in the form of handbooks, catalogs and manuscripts since 1955. It also conducts regular auctions and a sales circuit. It regularly awards outstanding exhibits. Members have access to over 70 years of the society's journals online, beginning with Vol. 1, No. 1, May-June 1948, plus a complete hi-resolution scan of every die used in the manufacture of US stamped envelopes.

== Current publications ==
- Bussey, Lewis E., Ed.; United States Postal Card Catalog, UPSS (2010).
- Gibbs, Irwin, Ed.; Postal Stationery of the Canal Zone; UPSS (2009).
- Krieger, George, Ed.; The Postal Stationery of the Possessions and Administrative Areas of the United States of America, UPSS (2009). ISBN 978-0-9800112-3-4
- Littrell, Robert, Ed.; Postal Cards of Spanish Colonial Cuba, Philippines and Puerto Rico, UPSS (2010); ISBN 978-0-9800112-4-1.
- Stendel, Robert; U.S. Domestic Postal Card Regulations 1874 to 1885, UPSS (2010).
- Undersander, Dan, Ed.; U.S. 19th Century Stamped Envelopes and Wrappers; UPSS (2012).
- Undersander, Dan, Ed.; Catalog of the 20th and 21st Century Stamped Envelopes and Wrappers of the United States (2011). ISBN 978-0-9800112-8-9
- Wukasch, Ken; Postal Cards of the World's Columbian Exposition, UPSS (2005).
