= Paper embossing =

Process to create reliefs in paper materials

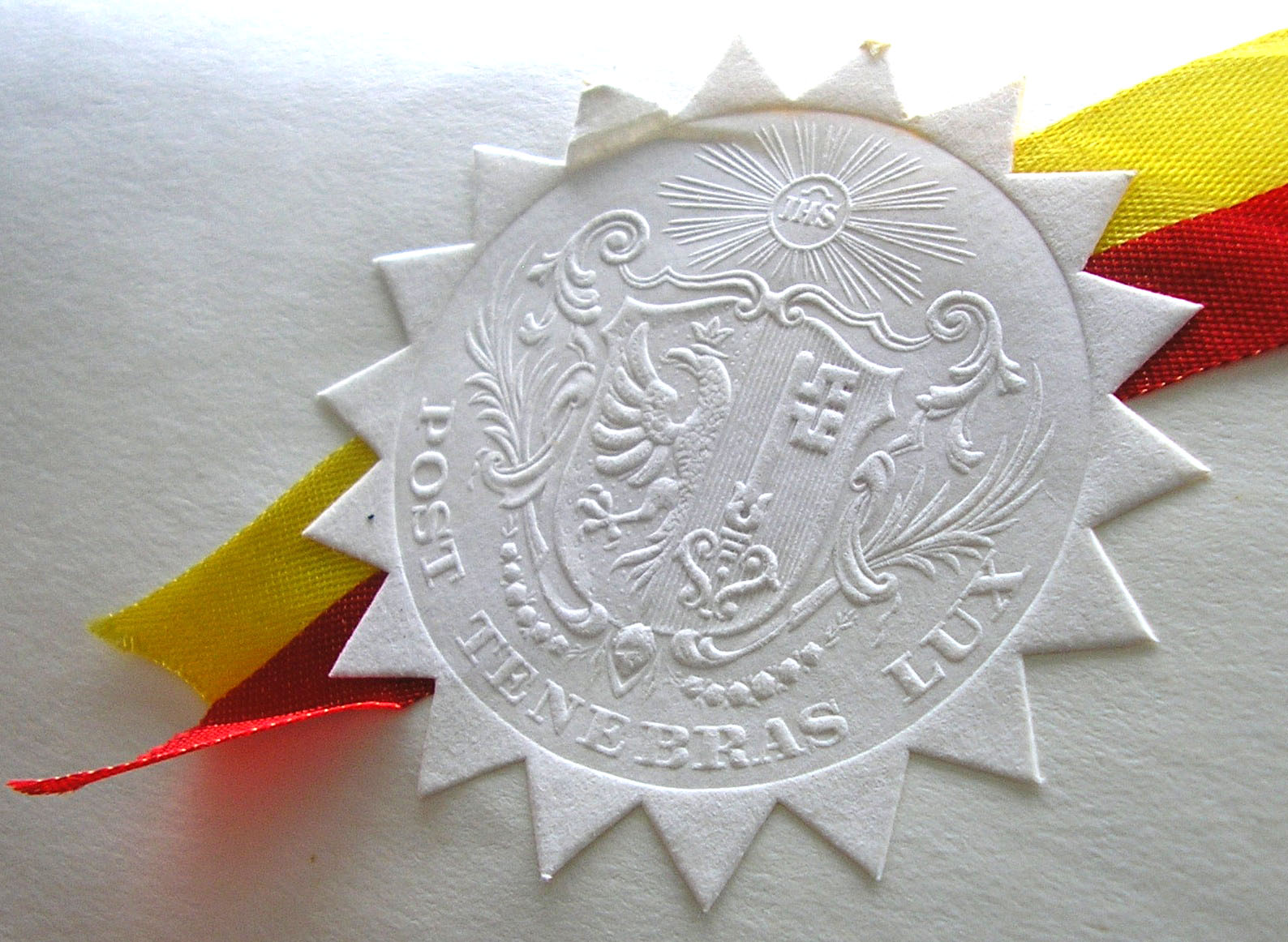
Embossed paper seal

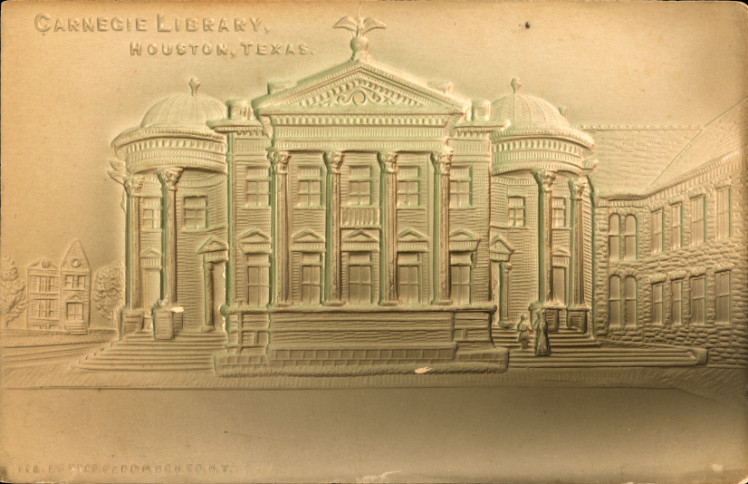
An embossed postcard, Carnegie Library, Houston, Texas (circa 1900–1924)

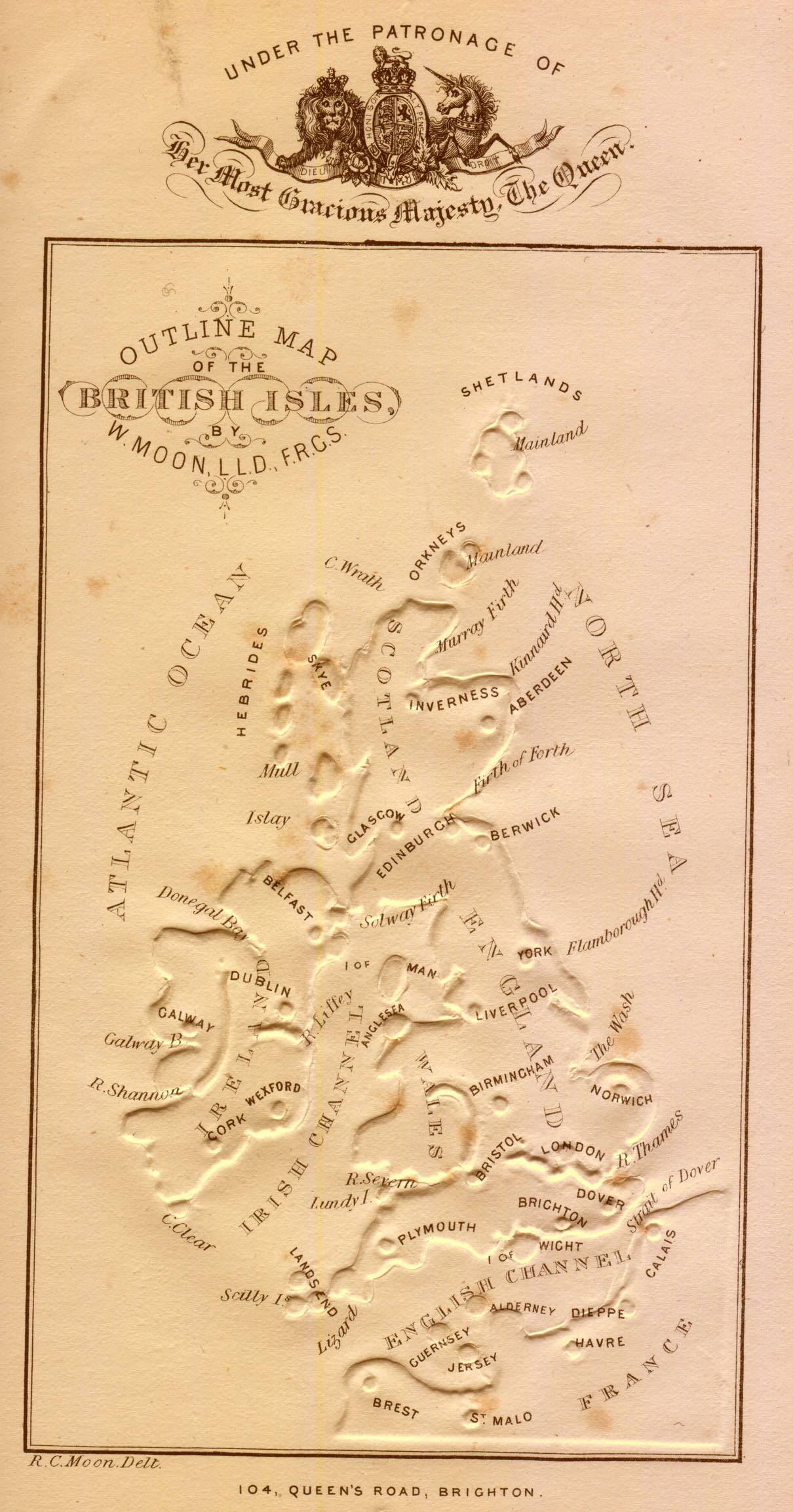
A debossed map of the British Isles, from William Moon's Light for the Blind, published in 1877

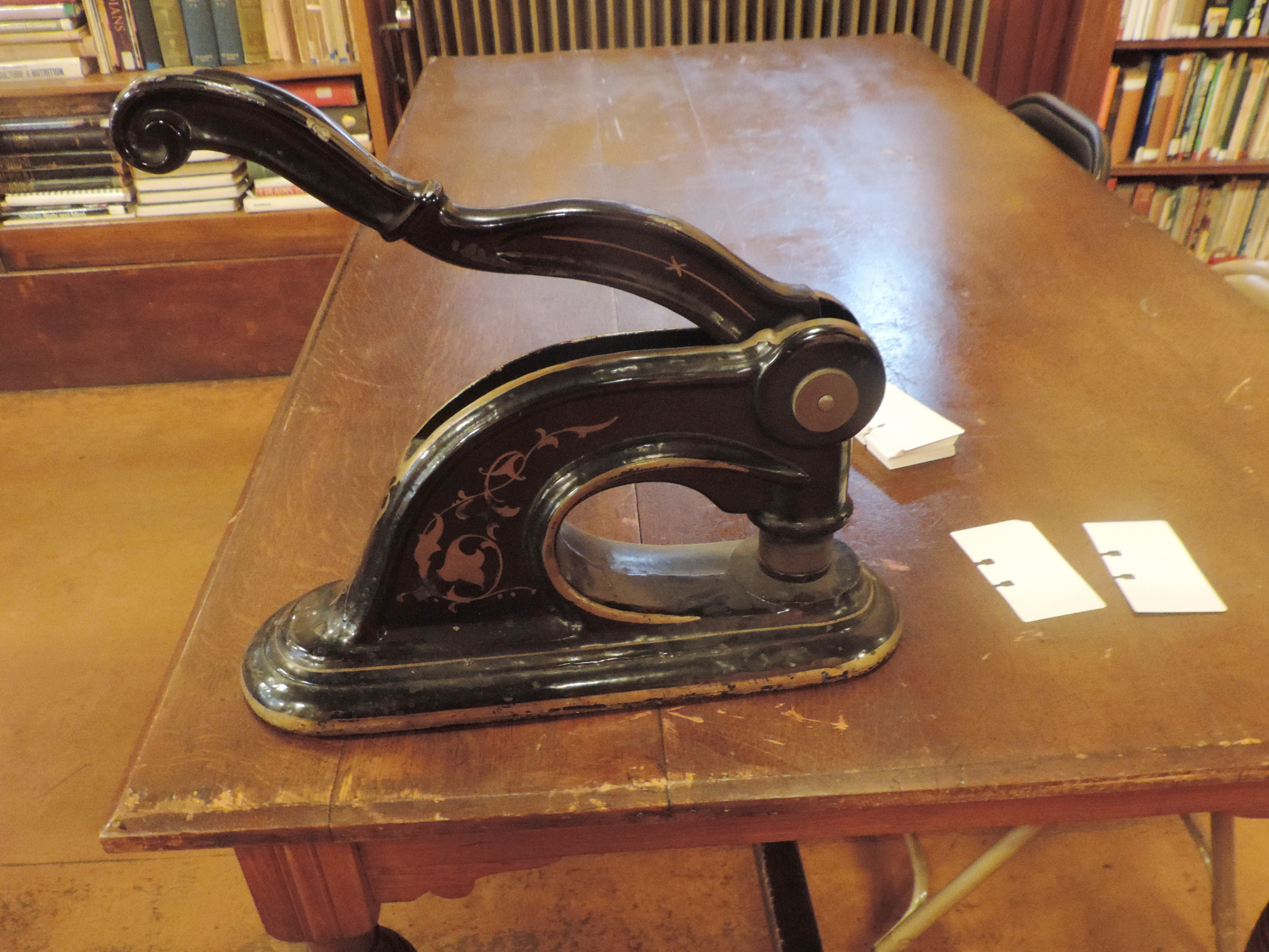
Hand-operated embossing machine

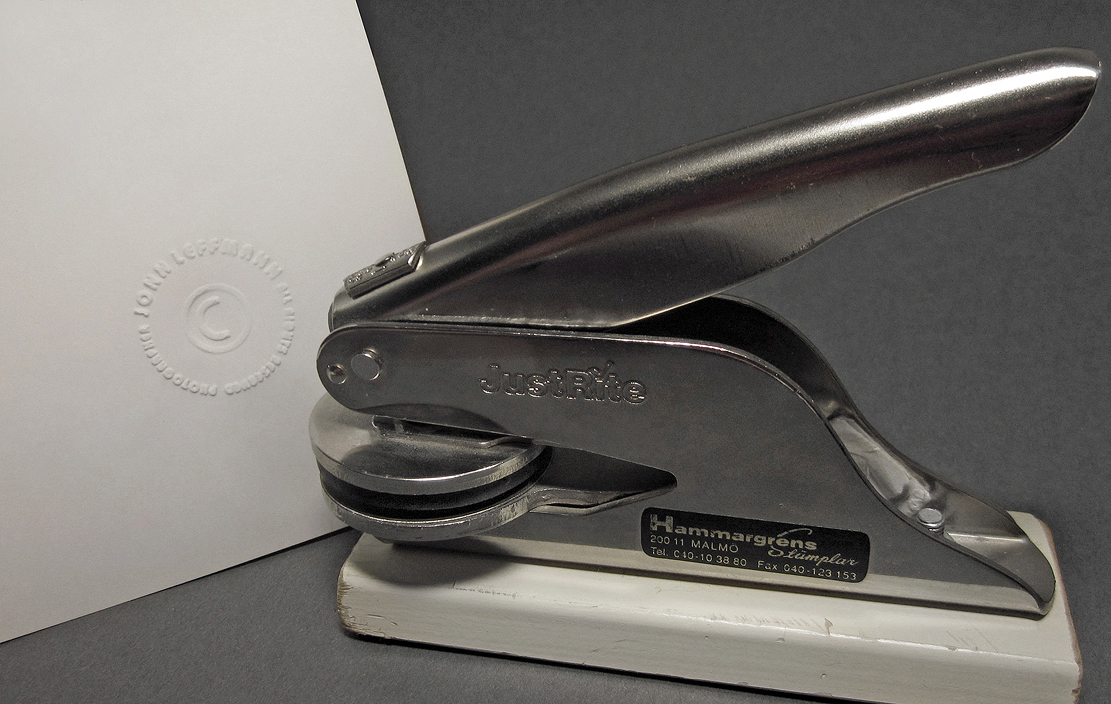
Hand-operated embossing for a photographer's copyright notice

Embossing and debossing are the processes of creating either raised or recessed relief images and designs in paper and other materials. An embossed pattern is raised against the background, while a debossed pattern is sunken into the surface of the material but might protrude somewhat on the reverse side.

== Techniques ==
Often used in combination with foil stamping, embossing alters the surface of paper stock or other substrates by providing a three-dimensional or raised effect on selected areas. The procedure requires the use of two dies: one that is raised and one that is recessed. The dies fit into each other so that when the paper is pressed between them, the raised die forces the stock into the recessed die and creates the embossed impression. A specific level of pressure is applied to the dies in order to squeeze the fibers of the paper, which results in a permanently raised area in the paper. When the dies are produced, a die maker engraves the desired image into several metal plates, which are the embossing dies for use on an embossing press. Generally, embossing is the process most often employed to attract attention or convey a high quality textural contrast in relation to the surrounding area of the paper stock.

"Debossing" is similar to embossing, but recesses the design rather than raising it. Rather than the paper being raised in specific areas, it is indented. The process involves applying pressure to the front side of a substrate and forcing the material down from the surface. Although it is not as common as embossing, it is occasionally used to provide a different effect or appearance that fits a particular theme. Embossing and debossing on digitally-printed applications is an off-line process, which may add a significant cost to the job.

The three factors that need to be controlled during the embossing process are:

1. Pressure: the intensity of the impact on the weight of the stock being embossed.
2. Heat: the ability to maintain a consistent heat level for the best impression.
3. Die depth: the client's artwork or the engraver's efforts will initially determine the die depth, however, if by looking at the artwork it appears that an adjustment of the die depth may be necessary, the die may need to be retooled to achieve a greater depth. Most types of paper can be embossed, and size is not normally a consideration. Embossing without ink, so that the image is raised but not colored, is called "blind embossing". Embossing used in conjunction with ink, so that the raised area is coloured, is called "colour register embossing". Embossing used in conjunction with foil stamping is called "combination stamping" or "combo stamping".

Embossing involves a separate stage in the production process, after any varnishing and laminating. It requires a separate press run, and is priced accordingly. In addition to being used as a design element on packaging, stationery, and marketing materials—such as presentation folders and business cards—embossing can be used to improve the performance of paper products like napkins, diapers, and tissue paper.

== Die materials ==
The metals most often used for die construction are zinc, magnesium, copper, and brass. The material used for a specific application depends upon a number of factors.

== Embossing types ==
=== Blind emboss ===
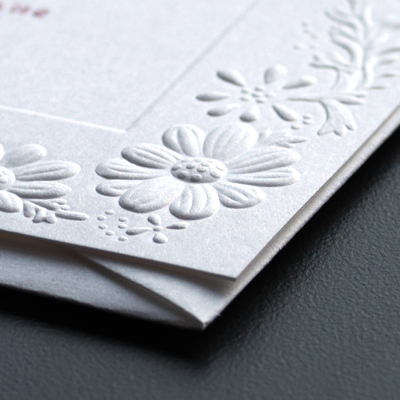
Blind embossed stationery

Blind embossing does not include the use of ink or foil to highlight the embossed area. The change in the dimensional appearance of the material is the only noticeable difference resulting from the embossing. The blind embossing process provides a clean and distinctive or subtle image on paper stock. It is best used to create a subtle impression or low level of attention to the piece, yet provide some slight form of differentiation for the finished work.

=== Registered emboss ===
Registered embossing is a process that places the embossed image in alignment with another element created with ink, foil, punching, or with a second embossed image.

=== Combination emboss ===
Combination embossing is the process of embossing and foil stamping the same image. It involves imprinting and aligning foil over an embossed image to create a foil emboss. A sculptured die, generally made of brass is used for this procedure. The process requires close registration that must be controlled to keep the image and foil matched precisely. The process of embossing and foil stamping is accomplished in one operation with the use of a combination die. The combination die has a cutting edge around the perimeter to cleanly break the excess foil away from the embossed area.

=== Pastelling ===
Pastelling is also referred to as tint leaf embossing. It involves the process of using a combination die to provide a subtle antique appearance to a substrate that is embossed and foil stamped. Pearl finishes, clear gloss, or similar pastel foil finishes can be selected that provide a soft two-color antique look (without scorching) to the embossed image. Lighter colored stocks work best to provide this soft contrasting effect.

=== Glazing ===
Glazing refers to an embossed area that has a shiny or polished appearance. Most often this process is accomplished with heat that is applied with pressure in order to create a shiny impression on the stock. Dark colored heavy weight stocks generally work best with glazing because the polished effect is much more noticeable and the dark color of the stock helps to eliminate or soften any burned appearance that may result from the application of the heat. When used in conjunction with foil, the process can provide the foil with a slightly brighter appearance.

=== Scorching ===
Scorching is similar to glazing except that it is not used to polish the stock. Instead, scorching does what it implies: as the temperature of the die heating plate is increased beyond a normal temperature range, a scorched effect is created in the embossed image, which results in an antique or shaded appearance. It is best to use a lighter colored stock for this procedure in order to provide a unique two-toned appearance. It is easy to burn the stock if too much heat is used.

== Document authentication ==
A notary public may use an embossed seal to mark legal papers, either in the form of an adhesive seal, or using a clamp-like embossing device, to certify a signature on a document, contract, etc., or cause to become certified through a notary public or bill. Registered professional engineers also use embossing seals to certify drawings, thereby guaranteeing to the recipient that due diligence has been exercised in the design. Government agencies use embossed seals to certify that an important document, such as a birth certificate, court order, etc., is an authentic, original copy, rather than a photocopy that could be altered in the copying process.

== On stamps ==
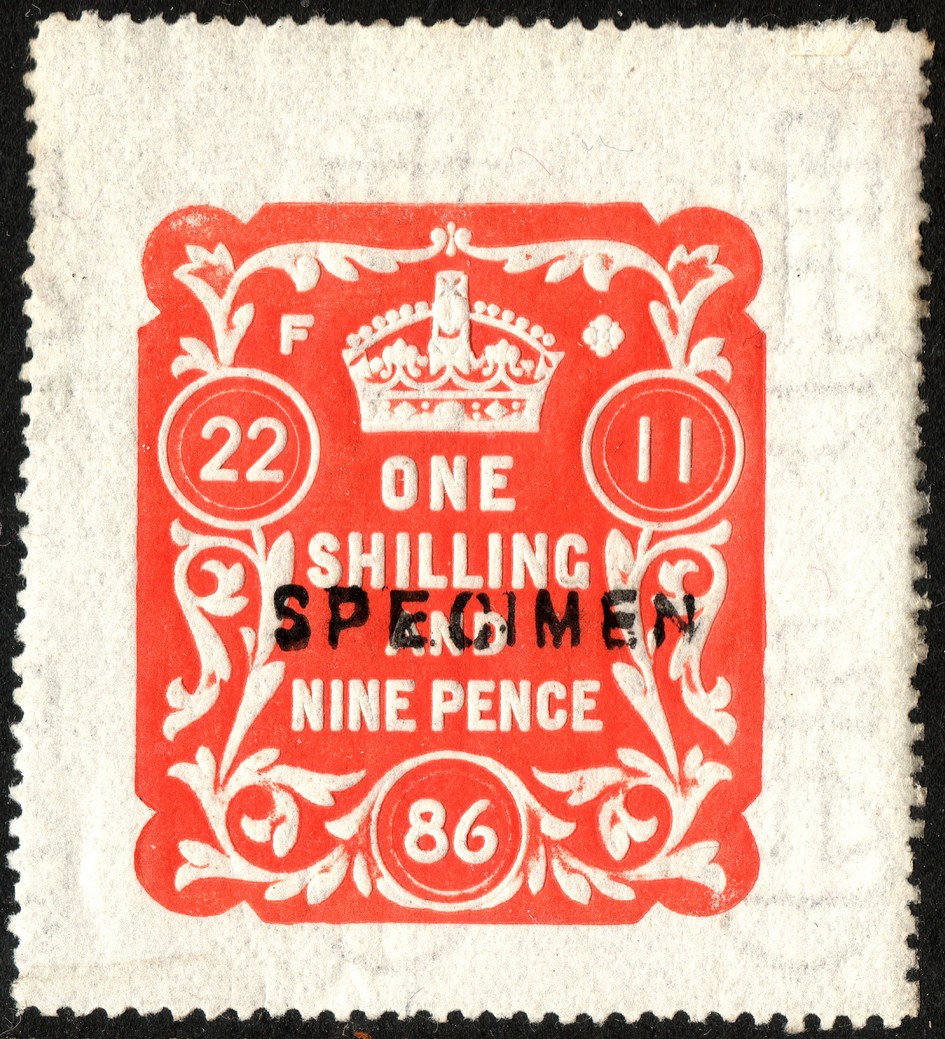
Embossing on an 1886 revenue stamp of Great Britain

Embossing has been used regularly on postage and other types of stamps. The embossed paper of a letter sheet or stamped envelope is called an indicium. Notable early examples include some of the earliest stamps of Italy, Natal, and Switzerland, as well as the early high values of Great Britain (1847–1854). Modern stamps still sometimes use embossing as a design element.

== See also ==
- Art movement
- Creativity techniques
- Gilding
- List of art media
- List of art movements
- List of art techniques
- List of stationery topics
- Relief
- Slate and stylus

== Sources ==
- Library of Technology
