= Apollo 15 postal covers incident =

1972 NASA scandal

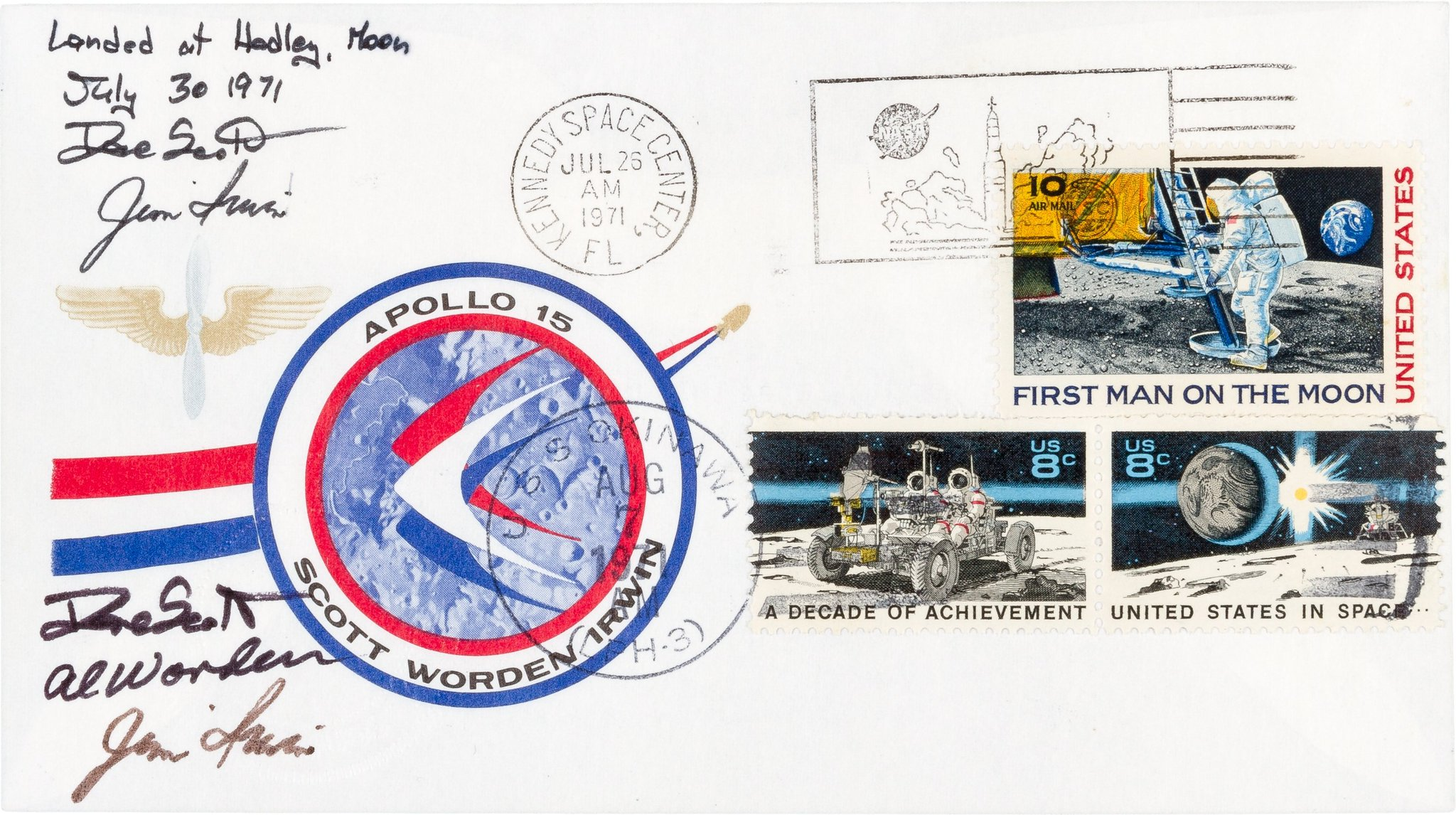
A "Sieger cover"

In June 1972, a scandal involving the crew of NASA's Apollo 15 became publicly known. The crew—David Scott, Alfred Worden, and James Irwin—had carried about 400 unauthorized postal covers (stamped and postmarked envelopes) into space and to the Moon's surface on the Lunar Module Falcon. Some of the envelopes were sold at high prices by West German stamp dealer Hermann Sieger, and are known as "Sieger covers". Scott, Worden, and Irwin all agreed to take payments for carrying the covers. Although they returned the money, they were reprimanded by NASA. Amid much press coverage of the incident, the astronauts were called before a closed session of a Senate committee and never flew in space again.

The three astronauts and an acquaintance, Horst Eiermann, had agreed to have the covers made and taken into space. Each astronaut was to receive about US$7,000 (equivalent to $53,878 in 2025). Scott arranged to have the covers postmarked on the morning of the Apollo 15 launch on July 26, 1971. They were packaged for space and brought to him as he prepared for liftoff; he brought them aboard in a pocket of his space suit. They were not included on the list of the personal items he was taking into space. The covers spent July 30 to August 2 on the Moon inside Falcon. On August 7, the date of splashdown, the covers were postmarked again on the recovery carrier USS Okinawa. One hundred were sent to Eiermann (and passed on to Sieger); the remaining covers were divided among the astronauts.

Worden had agreed to carry 144 additional covers, largely for an acquaintance, F. Herrick Herrick; these had been approved for travel to space. Apollo 15 carried a total of about 641 covers. In late 1971, when NASA learned that the Herrick covers were being sold, the astronauts' supervisor, Deke Slayton, warned Worden to avoid further commercialization of what he had been allowed to take into space. After Slayton heard of the Sieger arrangement, he removed the three as backup crew members for Apollo 17, though the astronauts had by then returned compensation from Sieger. The Sieger matter became generally known in the newspapers in June 1972. There was widespread coverage, with the astronauts portrayed negatively for their actions.

By 1977, all three former astronauts had left NASA. In February 1983, Worden sued, alleging the government's 1972 seizure of 298 of the envelopes without a hearing had violated the Constitution. The Department of Justice concluded it had no grounds for fighting the suit, and the government returned all the covers in an out-of-court settlement that July. In 2014, one of the postal covers given to Sieger sold for over $50,000 (equivalent to $68,000 in 2025).

== Background ==
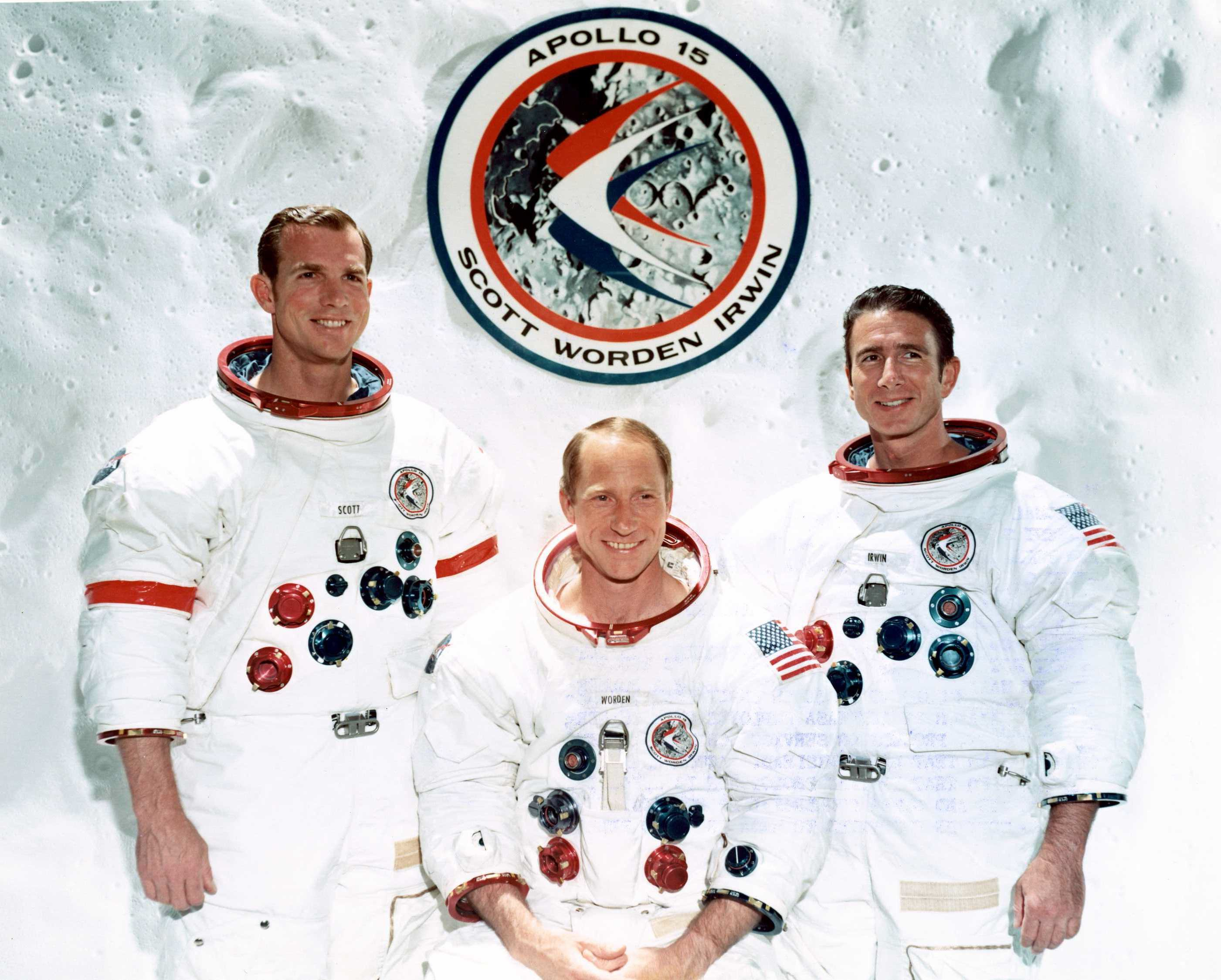
The Apollo 15 crew – left to right, David Scott, commander; Alfred Worden, command module pilot; James Irwin, Lunar Module pilot

After the start of the Space Age with the launch of Sputnik I on October 4, 1957, astrophilately (space-related stamp collecting) began. Nations such as the United States and USSR issued commemorative postage stamps depicting spacecraft and satellites. Astrophilately was most popular during the years of the Apollo program's Moon landings from 1969 to 1972. Collectors and dealers sought philatelic souvenirs related to the American space flight program, often through specially designed envelopes (known as covers). Cancelling covers submitted by the public became a major duty of the employees of the Kennedy Space Center (KSC) post office on space mission launch days.

The American astronauts participated in creating collectables. Beginning in the late 1960s, Harold G. Collins, head of the Mission Support Office at KSC, (Note: An office whose duties included aiding astronauts in the time leading up to their spaceflights) arranged for specially designed envelopes to be printed for the different missions, and to be canceled on the launch dates. Such unflown philatelic covers were often gifts for the astronauts' friends, or for employees of NASA and its contractors. Although it was not publicly known until September 1972, 15 of the men who entered space as Apollo program astronauts before Apollo 15 had agreed with a West German named Horst Eiermann to autograph 500 philatelic items (postcards and blocks of stamps) in exchange for $2,500 (equivalent to $19,000 in 2025). This included a member of each mission between Apollo 7 (1968) and Apollo 13 (1970). These items were not taken into space.

The astronauts were allowed to take Personal Preference Kits (PPKs) into space with them. These small bags, with their contents limited in size and weight, contained personal items the astronauts wanted to be flown as souvenirs of the mission. As the spaceflights moved toward and culminated in the Moon landings, the public's fascination with items flown in space increased, as did their value.

Covers were prepared by the crews and flown on Apollo 11, Apollo 13 and Apollo 14. Ed Mitchell, lunar module pilot for Apollo 14, took his to the Moon's surface in a PPK. These were often retained by the astronauts for many years; Apollo 11's Neil Armstrong kept his until he died, and they were not offered for sale until 2018, when one sold for $156,250 (roughly equivalent to $200,000 in 2025).

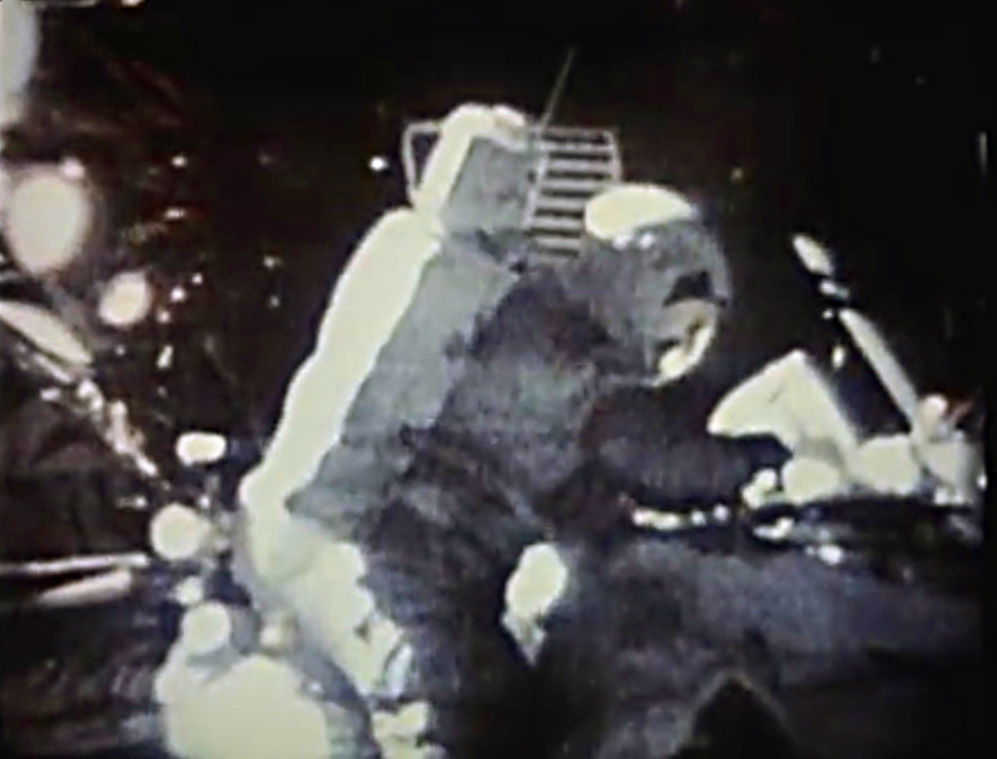
Commander Scott cancels an envelope on the Moon

The Apollo 15 mission began when the Saturn V launch vehicle blasted off from KSC on July 26, 1971, and ended when the astronauts and the Command Module Endeavour were recovered by the helicopter carrier USS Okinawa on August 7. On board Endeavour were Mission Commander David Scott, Command Module Pilot Alfred Worden and Lunar Module Pilot James Irwin. The Lunar Module Falcon, with Scott and Irwin aboard, landed on the Moon on July 30, and remained there for just under 67 hours. The mission set several space records and was the first to use the Lunar Roving Vehicle. Scott and Irwin rode it to explore the area around the landing site during three periods of extravehicular activity (EVA). On August 2, before finishing the final EVA and entering the Lunar Module, Scott used a special postmarking device to cancel a first day cover provided by the United States Postal Service bearing two new stamps, (Note: Die proofs perforated by hand were used rather than actual stamps.) whose designs depicted lunar astronauts and a rover, commemorating the tenth anniversary of Americans entering space. (Note: Scott catalog numbers 1434–1435.) That cover was returned to the Postal Service after the mission, and is now in the Smithsonian Institution's National Postal Museum.

== Preparation ==
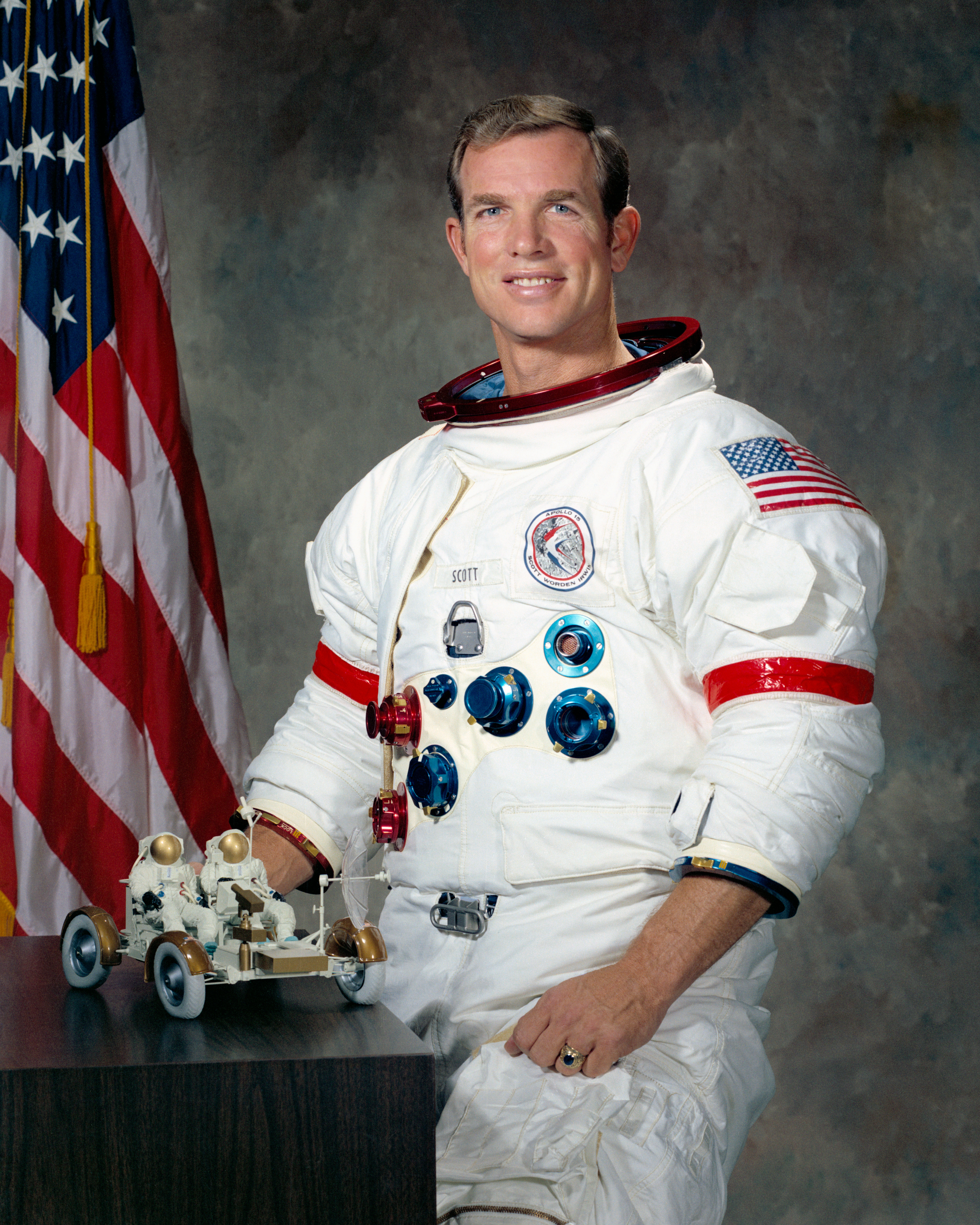
Apollo 15 Mission Commander David Scott

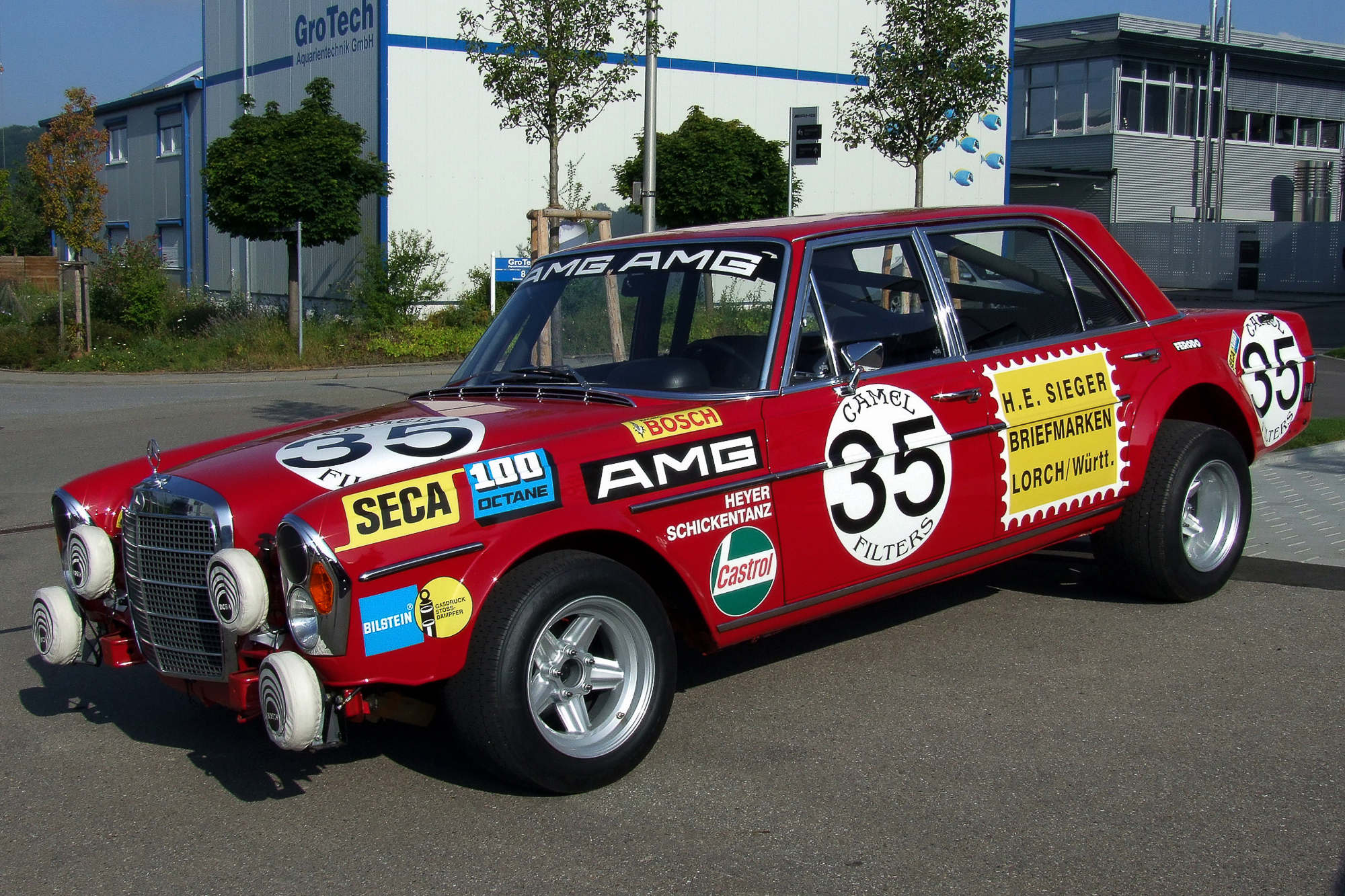
Mercedes-Benz 300 SEL 6.8 AMG Rote Sau with sponsoring by H. E. Sieger, 1971

Eiermann knew a stamp dealer named Hermann Sieger from Lorch, West Germany. The two had met by chance while on a bus to observe the launch of Apollo 12 in late 1969; Eiermann heard by Sieger's Swabian inflection that they were from the same part of Southern Germany, and invited him to his house. Sieger got the idea for the lunar covers after hearing that the Apollo 12 astronauts had taken a Bible with them. When Sieger learned that Eiermann knew many astronauts, he proposed that an Apollo crew be persuaded to take covers to the Moon. Eiermann did not think astronauts would take money to do so, but agreed to ask them when Sieger characterized the payments as investments for the astronauts' children. Eiermann did not mention Sieger's name in his approach to the astronauts.

Eiermann lived in Cocoa Beach, Florida, near KSC, and was a local representative of Los Angeles-based Dyna-Therm Corporation, a NASA contractor. According to Scott's autobiography, one night several months before launch, the astronauts' supervisor, Director of Flight Crew Operations Deke Slayton, had Scott and the other crew members come to dinner at Eiermann's house; Scott described Eiermann as a longtime friend of Slayton. In his autobiography, Worden concurred that the crew was invited to dinner there, but described Scott as inviting his crewmates, and did not mention involvement by Slayton. In his testimony before a congressional committee in 1972, Scott described Eiermann as a "friend of ours", someone with whom he had dined and who knew many people at KSC, including some of the astronauts. Scott also told the committee that he had met Eiermann at a party, rather than through another astronaut.

At the dinner, Eiermann proposed the astronauts carry 100 special stamp covers, to be flown to the Moon. Worden stated that he and Irwin, who had not previously gone into space, were assured that this was common practice. Worden recalled that the astronauts were told the covers would not be sold until after the Apollo program had ended. They would receive $7,000 each (equivalent to $54,000 in 2025). They were informed that other Apollo crews had made and profited from similar agreements. Earlier astronauts had been given free life insurance by Life magazine. This benefit was no longer available by the time of Apollo 15. Worden wrote that to ensure their families were provided for given the severe risks and dangers of their profession, the astronauts agreed to the deal, planning to put the payments aside as funds for their children. At the time, Scott earned $2,199 a month as an astronaut (equivalent to $16,900 in 2025), Worden $1,715 (equivalent to $13,200 in 2025) and Irwin $2,235 (equivalent to $17,200 in 2025).

According to Scott, the astronauts also decided the covers would make good gifts and requested an additional 100 each for a total of 400 covers. Scott indicated in his testimony that after discussion with his crewmates, he expected the covers to be a "very private and noncommercial enterprise". He added, "I admit that this is wrong. I understand it very clearly now. But at the time, for some naive and thoughtless reason, I did not understand the significance of it." Irwin wrote in his autobiography that the initial meeting with Eiermann took place in May 1971, and that the astronauts met with him twice thereafter. Eiermann relayed instructions from Sieger on how to prepare the covers: they were to be postmarked twice, at KSC on the date of launch and on the recovery ship on the date of splashdown, and carry a signed statement from the astronauts with a certification from a notary. The certification would make the covers more sellable in Europe, where a notary is a legal professional who often verifies the document, not just the signatures.

An additional 144 covers were flown pursuant to an understanding between Worden and F. Herrick Herrick of Miami, a retired movie director and a stamp collector. According to a letter reporting on the stamp incident from NASA Administrator James C. Fletcher to the chairman of the Senate Committee on Aeronautical and Space Sciences, Clinton P. Anderson, Herrick was a friend of the three astronauts who had arranged for Worden, also a stamp collector, to buy an album full of stamps and proposed the astronauts take covers into space. These would be split and set aside for some years, and then sold. In his book Worden said he had been introduced to Herrick at lunch by former race car driver Jim Rathmann, (Note: Rathmann owned a Cocoa Beach car dealership, and was friendly with many astronauts, for whom he got discount prices on General Motors automobiles. See Chaikin, p. 249.) and that Herrick proposed the plan. Worden also related his insistence the covers must be held, unsold and unpublicized, until after the Apollo program had ended, and he had retired from NASA and the Air Force. "I didn't want to do anything that would embarrass either myself or NASA, and I believed Herrick was as good as his word. It was a huge lapse in judgment on my part to trust this stranger. I was too old to believe in Santa Claus." In his 1972 testimony before the Senate committee, Worden described Herrick as a friend with whom he had had past dealings, and with whom he discussed the possibility of commemorative covers. According to a 1978 Justice Department report, before the Apollo 15 flight Herrick advised Worden that taking covers to the Moon would be a prudent investment because they would be valuable to stamp collectors.

While Scott and his crewmates were completing their mission training, a controversy developed within NASA and Congress over some of the souvenir silver medallions the crew of Apollo 14 had carried to the Moon. The private Franklin Mint, which had supplied the medallions in question, melted down some of those that had been flown. These were mixed with a large quantity of other metal, and commemorative medallions were struck from the mass, used as a premium to attract people to pay to join the Franklin Mint Collector's Club. The fact that some part of the medals had flown to the Moon was used in the mint's advertisements. Because the Apollo 14 crew had accepted no money, they were not disciplined. Slayton reduced the number of medallions each member of Apollo 15 could take along by half. He warned the Apollo 15 crew against carrying any items into space that could make money for them or others. In August 1965, Slayton had issued regulations requiring that items astronauts planned to carry be listed, approved by him, and checked for safety in space if similar items had not already been flown. Each crew member was bound by NASA standards of conduct issued in 1967 forbidding using one's position to make money for oneself or another person.

== Creation and spaceflight ==
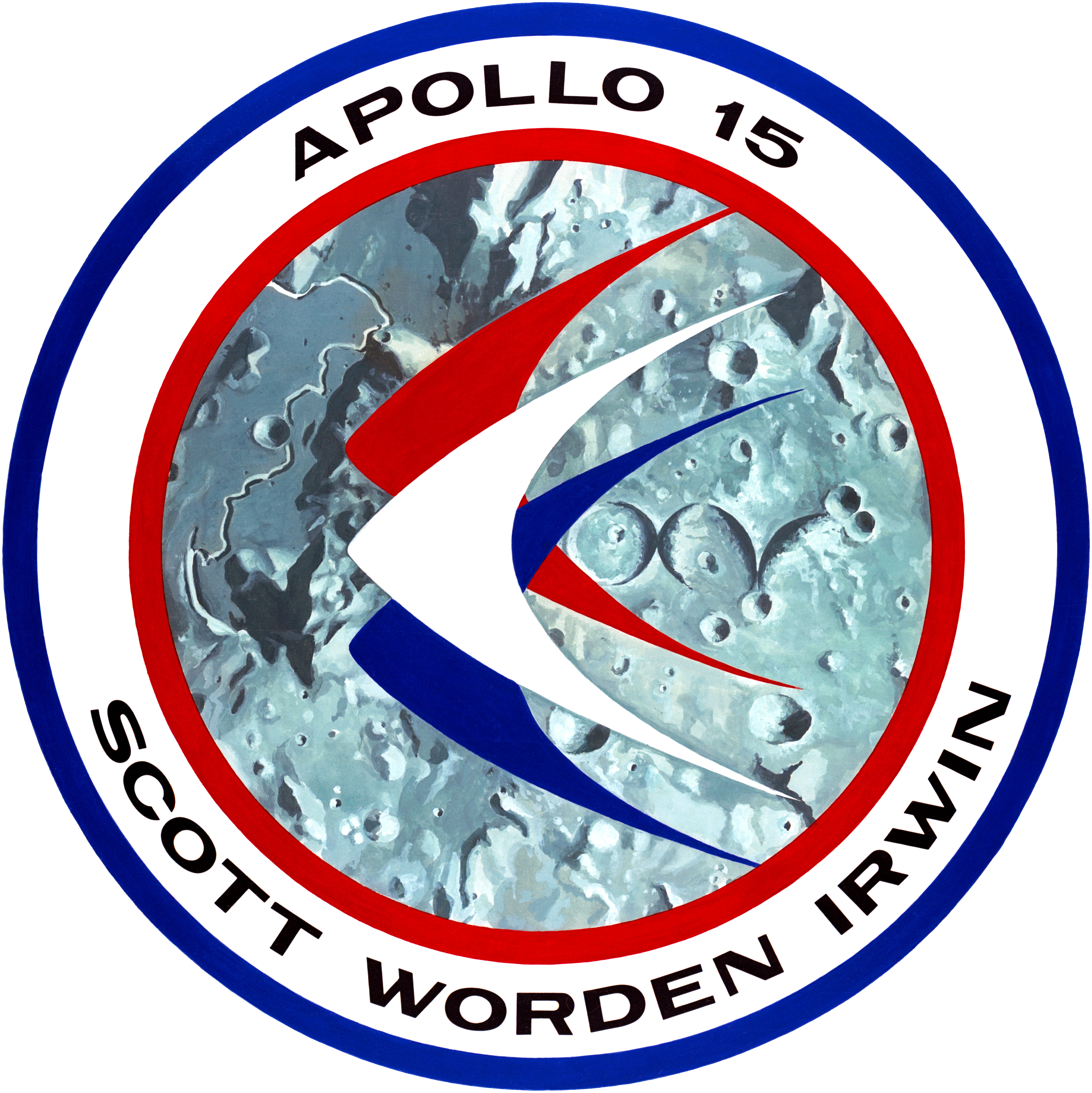
Apollo 15 mission patch design

Eiermann was supposed to create the cachet for the special covers he had proposed, but time ran short and Scott did it instead. He used the Apollo 15 mission patch to create the design, and gave it to Collins of the Mission Support Office. Collins arranged with the Brevard Printing Company of Cocoa, Florida, for the design to be reproduced on both regular and lightweight envelopes. The company performed the work and billed Alvin B. Bishop Jr. $156 for the lightweight envelopes and $209 for the regular ones. Bishop, a public relations executive who specialized in the aerospace industry, and knew many astronauts, created specially designed covers for a number of the Apollo missions, which he supplied only to the crew and their families. He was at the time employed by Hughes Enterprises in Las Vegas; the company paid the bill.

Herrick secured the services of a commercial artist, Vance Johnson, with whom Worden discussed the design, resulting in 100 envelopes depicting the phases of the Moon. Worden listed these covers as part of the contents of his PPK for Slayton's approval, along with 44 first day covers that he owned. Ad-Pro Graphics, Inc. of Miami printed the Herrick envelopes, along with card inserts stating the accompanying cover had been carried on Apollo 15. Herrick paid the firm's bill of $50.50; he also obtained the postage stamps for the covers, and two rubber stamps stating the dates of the launch and splashdown. The design was printed on labels that were affixed to the envelopes. Not all Herrick covers are identical, as different cachets, rubber stamp impressions and combinations of postage stamps were used. Worden also carried a cover postmarked in 1928, autographed by aviation pioneer Orville Wright.

In addition to those brought by Scott and by Worden, Irwin carried 96 covers, one with a "flown-to-the-Moon" theme, eight with an Apollo 15 design, and 87 covers honoring Apollo 12, carried as a favor for Barbara Gordon, wife of Apollo 12 astronaut Dick Gordon. Barbara Gordon, a stamp collector, had wanted her husband to take the covers on his lunar mission, but he had refused. The flown-to-the-Moon cover was a favor for a friend of Dick Gordon. Apollo 15 carried the cover from the Postal Service to be canceled on the surface of the Moon. The agency also sent a backup, stowed in the Command Module with another cancellation device, (Note: The postmark applied on the Moon read UNITED STATES ON THE MOON; the backup read MOON LANDING, U.S.A. See Winick, pp. 87–88.) for use on the homeward journey if Scott did not get to postmark the lunar cover.

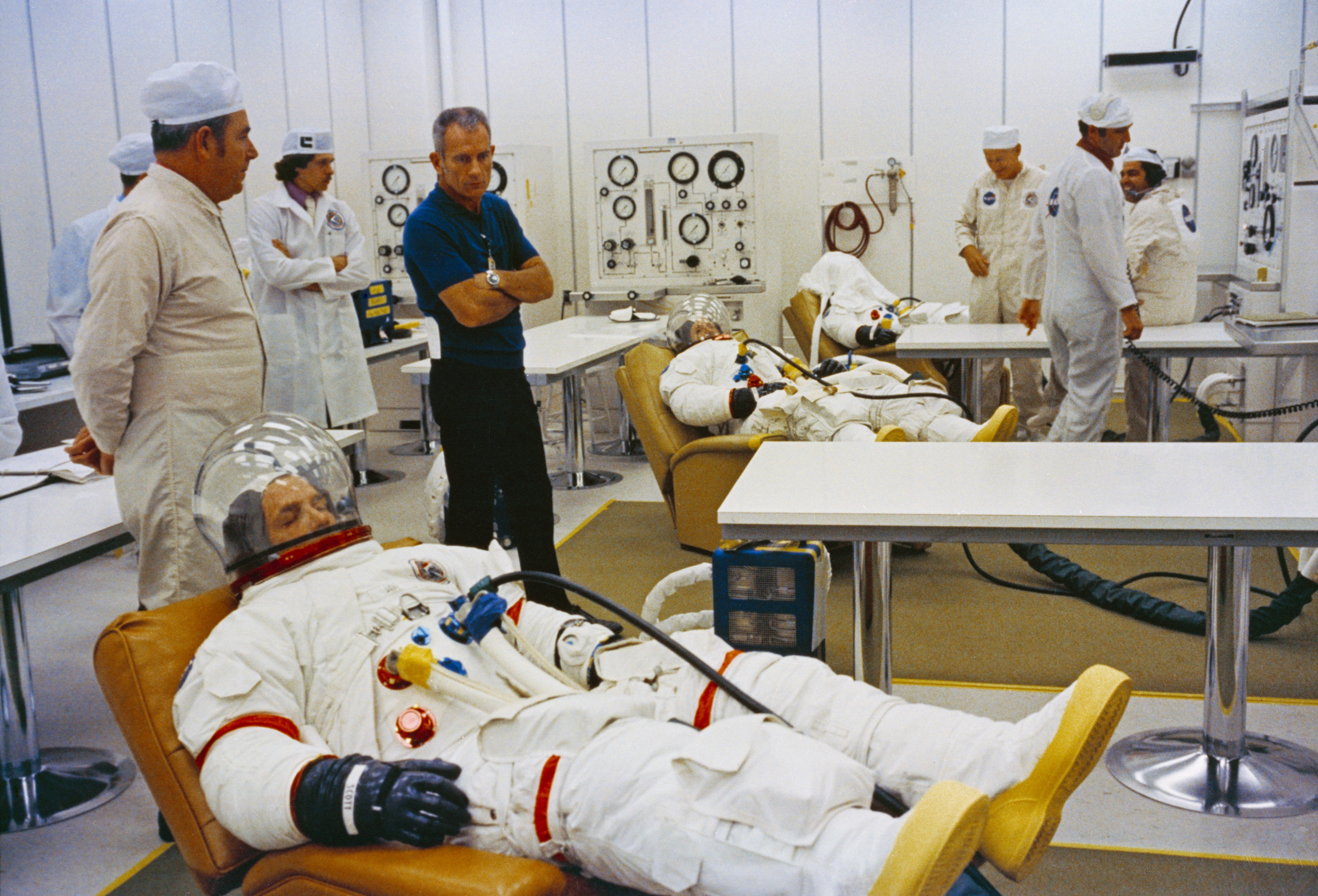
Deke Slayton (in blue) looks on as David Scott rests after suiting before the launch of Apollo 15, July 26, 1971.

All covers except the group of 400 had been authorized by Slayton, who stated in his testimony that he would almost certainly have approved them if asked (assuming their weight could be negotiated with the Flight Manager), on condition that they stay in the Command Module and not go to the lunar surface. In July 1972, after the story broke, William Hines of the Chicago Sun-Times wrote that "the idea that this complicated caper could have been carried out without the knowledge and at least tacit permission of Slayton is regarded by people familiar with NASA as ludicrous. Slayton's tight rein over his sometimes fractious charges is legendary".

The crew bought several hundred of the ten-cent First Man on the Moon postage stamp issue. (Note: Scott catalog number C76.) These were affixed to the lightweight envelopes by secretaries in the Astronaut Office. Collins had made arrangements for the KSC post office to open at 1:00 am EDT on launch day—opening this facility so early on an Apollo launch morning was not unusual—and brought several hundred of the stamped covers. Once the envelopes had been run through the cancellation machine, he took them to the astronaut quarters, where members of the Flight Crew Support Team vacuum sealed them in Teflon-covered fiberglass to fireproof them for space. Normally, if the Flight Crew Support Team found that an item was not on an astronaut's PPK list, they would add it, and check to make sure it was approved, but team leader James L. Smotherman stated that he "goofed", explaining that he had confused the 400 covers with the Herrick envelopes, which had been approved by Slayton. Since the 400 covers had not been approved by Slayton, they were considered unauthorized. Scott stated, "I never intended to bootleg the covers. If I had intended to bootleg the covers, I certainly would not have allowed Mr. Collins to handle them or the rest of the people to assist me." Like other items being placed in the pockets on Scott's space suit (for example, his sunglasses), they were first shown to him by the suit technicians helping him dress. Divided into two packets, the bundled covers were about 2 in (5 cm) thick and weighed about 850 g (30 oz); they entered the spacecraft in Scott's pocket. Apollo 15 blasted off for the Moon at 9:34 am on July 26, 1971, with three astronauts and about 641 covers aboard. (Note: Faries noted that in 1983, 61 Herrick envelopes were returned by NASA to Worden, rather than the expected 60, but the 61st had no postal markings. For a full discussion of the number of covers, see Faries, pp. 29–31.)

Liftoff of Apollo 15, July 26, 1971

At some point while the mission was en route to the Moon, the 400 covers were moved into the lunar lander Falcon; in his testimony, Scott agreed this violated the rules. He stated he did not recall how the transfer took place, and that he was only certain that the envelopes went to the lunar surface because they were in the bag of items taken out of the Falcon in preparation for the return to Earth. Worden stated in his testimony that they were aware of the presence of the covers in the Command Module after the mission's launch, but he did not recall if the covers had been among the many items moved into the Falcon in preparation for the lunar landing; he did not believe the matter had been discussed during the flight. He wrote in his autobiography that the night he had agreed to the deal with Eiermann "was the last I heard or thought of about the covers until after the flight ... What arrangements Dave [Scott], Eiermann, and Sieger made to get the covers onto the flight, I never knew until later. Dave later told a congressional committee that he had placed them in a pocket of his spacesuit, but he never shared that information with me". He indicated that the covers he had arranged to have on board, including those from Herrick, remained in his PPK in the Command Module throughout the flight. The testimony before Congress, from multiple individuals including Apollo 15 astronauts, was that carrying the covers did not interfere with the mission in any way.

[Scott:] What's that, Jim?
[Irwin:] No!
[Worden:] Good. Very good.
[Scott:] Okay?
[Worden:] Yes. You got to – yes. We've already signed those, haven't we? We haven't signed these? It really doesn't make much difference, does it?
[Scott:] No.
[Worden:] We don't really have to sign them now I guess. We can do that anytime.
[Worden (continuing):] Yes, those – those covers would have been infinitely more valuable, I think.
[Scott:] Oh, well.
[Worden:] Maybe, Dave, it's just as well we didn't.
[Irwin:] Okay.

— NASA, Apollo 15 Command Module Onboard Voice Transcription, p. 267. August 3, 1971, 1:56:11 pm through 1:57:21 pm EDT (mission time 196:22:11 through 196:23:21), aboard Endeavour in lunar orbit above the far side of the Moon

Apollo 15 splashed down about 335 miles (539 km) north of Honolulu at 4:46 pm EDT (UTC–04:00) on August 7, 1971; the crew was retrieved by helicopters from the Okinawa. Scott had asked that a supply of the twin space stamps of the design he had canceled on the Moon (issued August 2) be available on the Okinawa, and on July 14, Forrest J. Rhodes, who ran the postal facility at KSC, wrote to the Chief Petty Officer in charge of the Okinawa's post office. The ship replied on the 20th, saying the stamps could be obtained in time. The stamps were secured from the post office at Pearl Harbor; 4,000 were flown to the Okinawa at sea by helicopter, reportedly in the custody of a naval officer joining the vessel. The astronauts had no money with them; their purchases were paid for by high-ranking officers aboard the Okinawa, who were later reimbursed. The crew had the assistance of Okinawa crew members in affixing the stamps to the 400 covers for cancellation by the ship's post office. The Irwin covers were not postmarked, either at liftoff or splashdown. Worden wrote in his book that he never saw the covers Scott had brought until the astronauts were on the flight to Houston. However, as Scott mentioned he was having them postmarked with the splashdown date, Worden arranged to have that done for the ones he had taken into space. On the flight, the 400 covers were autographed by the three astronauts; the Herrick covers were also signed while en route. Irwin remembered the signing took several hours.

== Distribution ==
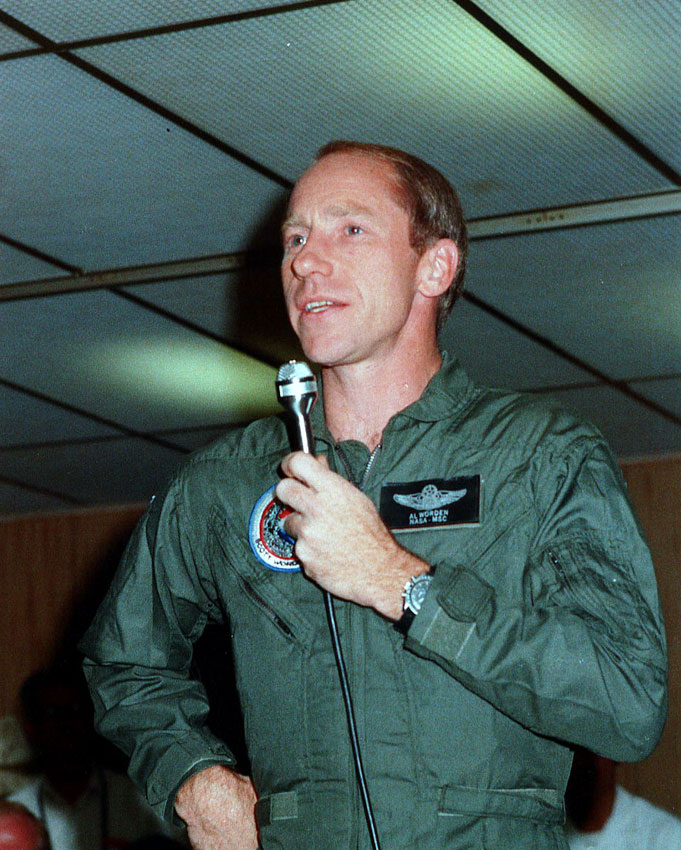
Worden aboard the Okinawa

On August 31, 1971, Carrie Bess Carsey, a clerk in the Astronaut Office in Houston, typed certifications on 100 of the covers, with the aid of other NASA employees in her office. The certifications stated the cover had been on the Moon aboard the Falcon. The covers already carried a handwritten statement signed by Scott and Irwin that they had been landed on the Moon on July 30. Carsey later stated that in signing the certifications as a Texas notary public, she only intended to certify their signatures were genuine. The question of whether Carsey had improperly certified that the covers had been landed on the Moon (something of which she had no personal knowledge) was the subject of an investigation by the Texas Attorney General. With the notary certifications, the last of Sieger's requirements for the covers was fulfilled. On September 2, Scott sent the 100 covers by registered mail to Eiermann, who was in Stuttgart, where he had moved. Eiermann turned the covers over to Sieger, and was rewarded with a commission of about $15,000 (equivalent to $115,000 in 2025)— ten percent of the anticipated proceeds. The remaining 300 were entrusted by the astronauts to a Houston-area stamp collector who arranged with a local printer to have an inscription stating that the cover had been carried to the Moon printed in the upper left. The printer discovered there were 298 covers, not 300; the stamp collector consulted Scott, who told him not to worry about it. One of Irwin's covers from the group of eight, with a shamrock design as its cachet, was given to Rhodes and one to the president of the Kennedy Space Center Philatelic Society; Irwin said in 1972 that he had retained the other six.

Sieger notified his customers of the flown covers via a mailing, selling them at DM 4,850 (about $1,500 at the time, or $11,500 now), with a discount to those who bought more than one. He kept one for himself, and by November had sold the remaining 99. He numbered and signed the backs of the envelopes in the lower left as a token of their genuineness.

Worden recalled in his book that he sent the agreed number of 44 covers to Herrick soon after returning from space. He also sent him 60 belonging to himself for safekeeping, and gave 28 to friends. Herrick consigned 70 covers to Robert A. Siegel, a prominent New York dealer. Siegel sold ten covers for a total of $7,900 (equivalent to $61,000 in 2025), receiving a commission from Herrick of 25 percent. Herrick sold three himself for $1,250 each (equivalent to $9,600 in 2025) and placed several on commission in Europe.

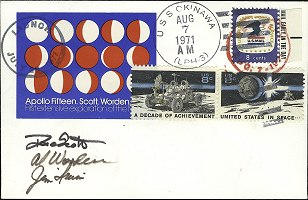
One of the covers created for Herrick

In late October 1971, a potential customer for one of the Herrick covers wrote to NASA to inquire about its authenticity. On November 5, Slayton responded, saying NASA could not confirm whether it was genuine. He warned Worden to ensure that his covers would not be further commercialized. Worden wrote an angry letter to Herrick. In June 1972, Herrick instructed Siegel to send 60 covers to Worden in Houston, which he did by registered mail. Until this point, Siegel had assumed the 60 covers belonged to Herrick.

Probably before they made an official NASA trip to Europe in November 1971, the Apollo 15 astronauts received and completed the paperwork necessary to open accounts in a Stuttgart-area bank to receive the agreed upon $7,000 payments (equivalent to $54,000 in 2025). According to Scott's testimony, while they were in Europe, they heard the Sieger covers were being sold commercially. Scott called Eiermann, who promised to look into it. The astronauts indicated they received the bankbooks in early 1972. Irwin remembered in his autobiography that before their trip to Europe, Scott came to him and said, "Jim, we are in trouble now—they are starting to sell the envelopes over there", and that the covers cast a shadow over their European trip. Scott said the crew discussed it among themselves, then decided that the receipt of funds was improper. In late February they returned the bankbooks to Eiermann, who responded that the astronauts should receive something for their efforts. Howard C. Weinberger, in his account of the Apollo 15 covers, deemed the astronauts' refusal "an effort to save their careers and reputations". The crew initially agreed to accept albums filled with aerospace-themed stamps for their children, including issues in honor of Apollo 15. Scott related that they decided this too was improper and said they wanted nothing. This final refusal happened in April 1972. Worden remembered, "we did this before NASA asked us anything about a deal with Sieger—before NASA even knew about it".

== Scandal ==
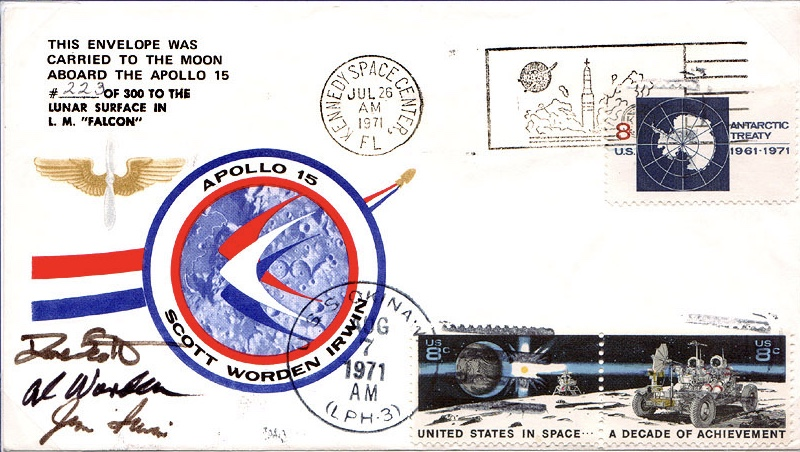
One of the covers impounded by NASA in 1972 and released to the astronauts in 1983

Discussion of the covers in European philatelic publications alerted collectors in the United States. On March 11, 1972, Lester Winick, president of a group of collectors of space stamps and covers known as the Space Topics Study Group, sent a letter to NASA's general counsel asking a number of questions about the Sieger covers. The letter was forwarded for a response to Slayton, who casually mentioned it to Irwin in late March; Irwin told him to talk to Scott. Slayton spoke with Worden on the assumption that the covers referred to were among the group of 144, but Worden told him this was not necessarily the case and that he should talk to Scott. Slayton did talk to Scott in mid-April, just before the launch of Apollo 16. Scott told him there had been 400 covers not on the approved list, and that 100 had been given to a friend. In his autobiography, Slayton wrote that he confronted Scott and Worden about what he called a "regular goddamn scandal": "they told me what the deal was, and I got pretty goddamn angry. So I was through with Scott, Worden, and Irwin. After 16 splashed down, I kicked them off the backup crew for 17." One reason for Slayton's anger was that he had defended the astronauts as rumors of the high prices being paid for the covers circulated; according to Andrew Chaikin in his history of the Apollo program, Slayton "went out on a limb to defend his people". Slayton wrote to Winick, stating that the spacecraft had carried covers, but NASA could not confirm these particular envelopes had been taken; he did not tell Winick unauthorized covers had been flown. He sent a copy of his response to the general counsel's office at NASA Headquarters in Washington, which took no action. Slayton did not inform Administrator Fletcher, Deputy Administrator George M. Low or his own superior, Christopher C. Kraft of the postage stamp incident or of the disciplinary action he had taken. (Note: On May 23, 1972, NASA issued a press release announcing that Irwin planned to retire, and based on that, a new backup crew for Apollo 17 was being put in place, excluding Scott and Worden. See NASA press release 72–113, "Astronauts Mitchell and Irwin to Retire", May 23, 1972.)

In early June 1972, Low heard from a member of his staff of the possibility covers flown on Apollo 15 might have been sold in Europe. He asked Associate Administrator Dale D. Myers to enquire through NASA management channels for information. Low kept Fletcher informed of the situation as it developed. Myers made an interim report to Low on the 16th. Before he could make his final report on the 26th, the story broke with an article in The Washington Sunday Star on June 18. Kraft interviewed Scott on the 23rd. Low ordered a full investigation by NASA's Inspections Division on June 29.

According to Low in his personal notes, during the investigation, Scott, who had to that point maintained that the astronauts had never intended to profit from the Sieger covers, disclosed the information about the German bank accounts. Once the facts had been developed, Low consulted with Fletcher, Kraft, Slayton and others regarding whether to expel the three men from the Astronaut Corps and return them to the Air Force, to reprimand them and retain them within NASA outside the corps, or to reprimand them but allow them to remain astronauts. Low accepted Kraft's recommendation to reprimand the astronauts, and to state that their actions would be taken into consideration in their future assignments. Low asked to meet with the crew members before making a final decision, and this took place on July 10, Scott and Worden individually at Low's Washington office and Irwin by telephone. All admitted the basic facts, with Scott making "the point for the first time that his intention had really been to use the funds for a trust fund for his children, and not for any direct personal use". Worden, also admitting the facts, stated that he felt he had "taken most of the beating", and in a way was relieved the full story was being aired. Irwin, who had already decided to leave NASA, expressed his concern for Scott's future.

Later on July 10, the three astronauts were reprimanded for poor judgment, something that made it extremely unlikely that they would be selected to fly in space again. Richard S. Lewis, in his early history of the Apollo program, noted that "in the atmosphere of wheeling and dealing that has characterized government agency-industrial contractor relations in the Space Age, the unauthorized freight that the Apollo 15 crew hauled to the moon was a boyish prank. In the rhetoric of space program critics, though, it was branded as exploitation for personal gain of the most costly technological development in history. In the press, the astronauts were treated like fallen angels." Kraft remembered in his memoirs that Slayton told him, "They did it. There was no hiding. Dave just said sure, nothing wrong with it, right?" Scott, while stating, "we made a mistake in even considering it", felt that the reaction "was turning into a witch-hunt". Worden, though admitting blame for entering into the deal, felt that NASA had not adequately supported him, and that Scott had not taken full responsibility for his role. He believed that Slayton would not have required them to leave the Astronaut Corps if left to himself, but that Kraft had insisted. Irwin, who would become an evangelist after leaving the Astronaut Corps, said that NASA had no choice but to reprimand them. He hoped he could turn the experience to use in his ministry, that it would help him empathize with others who had erred.

The hearings themselves did not go well at all. [NASA Inspections Division director Bartley A. Fugler] made a very poor witness. He was imprecise, vague, and just did not look like a strong investigator. Fletcher and I took a severe beating on NASA's administrative procedures. Chris Kraft took a very offensive approach to the Committee, which of course, annoyed the Committee. Deke made a fairly good witness, but the Committee did not believe his story. The astronauts themselves appeared to be even more naïve than they actually were.

— NASA Deputy Administrator George M. Low

In mid-July, the media reported on the dispute over the sculpture Fallen Astronaut, left on the Moon by Scott in tribute to those killed in the American and Soviet space programs; the sculptor was having copies made for public sale, over the astronauts' objection. Due to the increasing publicity surrounding the incident, and concerned about the appearance of commercialization of Apollo 15, the Senate Committee on Aeronautical and Space Sciences set a hearing for August 3. It called a number of NASA employees including the astronauts, Slayton, Kraft, Fletcher and Low to appear. Fletcher and Low had tried to talk Senator Anderson out of having a hearing, but the chairman insisted. Worden remembered that while there were difficult questions asked about the astronauts' conduct, part of the committee's concern was why NASA management had allowed another incident to happen so quickly after the Apollo 14 Franklin Mint matter. Members also wanted to know how it was that NASA's chain of command permitted allegations against the astronauts to go unreported to senior management. Because of the efforts of Fletcher and Low, Anderson invoked a rarely used Senate rule for when testimony might impact the reputation of witnesses or others, closing the hearing to the public. Kraft recalled that while he and Low were grilled by the committee, the senators treated the astronauts "like gods".

== Aftermath ==
The other astronauts were divided in their opinions. Some saw it as simply a dumb mistake. Others thought Scott, as mission commander, should be court-martialed. To some, it was a gray area. Astronauts had sold their autographs, for example, and profited in other less dramatic ways from their fame. But this time, there was so much money involved, and it had all become so public. It had tarnished the astronaut corps. That it had all been done by earnest, straight-arrow Dave Scott, whose mission had been such a high point for Apollo, only made the shock greater ... Whatever the astronauts thought of the stamp affair, the damage was done ... For better or for worse, the myth of the Perfect Astronaut had crumbled.

— Andrew Chaikin, A Man on the Moon: The Voyages of the Apollo Astronauts (1995 edition), pp. 497–498

None of the Apollo 15 crew flew in space again. Given that the reprimands would damage their career prospects in the Air Force, they were offered other positions at NASA where their skills could be used. Scott was made a technical adviser on the Apollo-Soyuz Test Project (the first joint mission with the Soviet Union) and retired from the Air Force in 1975. He became director of NASA's Dryden Flight Research Center, retiring from NASA in October 1977 and entering the private sector. Worden transferred to NASA's Ames Research Center in California, remaining there until his 1975 retirement both from the Air Force and NASA, and then entered the private sector. Irwin retired in 1972 and founded an evangelical group.

Fletcher asked astronauts still with NASA, and even those who were not, such as Apollo 7's Wally Schirra, to turn in all flown covers in their possession to NASA pending a determination of whether they were government property. Kraft related that there was resistance from astronauts, but "we confiscated them, sometimes under duress". These covers were returned when the Justice Department chose to take no action, "and whatever happened to them was kept quiet". Among the astronauts interviewed in NASA's investigation was Apollo 13's Jack Swigert, who denied any dealings with envelopes; after he subsequently admitted he had, Low removed him from Apollo-Soyuz.

Kraft suspended some 15 astronauts who "had broken faith with us and ignored a standing order from Deke"; some, having apologized and served their suspensions, flew on Skylab in the mid-1970s. The covers affair resulted in prejudice in the Air Force against former astronauts (all three Apollo 15 astronauts had served there). This deterred Apollo 14's Stu Roosa from returning to the Air Force when he left NASA, leading him to go into business instead. Although Apollo 16's Charles Duke had taken covers to the lunar surface in April 1972, changes to the PPK procedures instituted by NASA meant that none were taken on Apollo 17 that December. Today, astronauts are forbidden by federal regulation from taking philatelic items into space as mementos.

The remaining covers in the Apollo 15 astronauts' control (298 from the group of 400 (Note: Scott testified at the August 3, 1972, hearing that two covers had gone astray from the expected number, but stated that he had never counted them and thus there might only have been 398 to begin with. See August 3, 1972 hearing, pp. 15–16.) and 61 more from Worden (Note: Faries noted that in 1983, 61 Herrick envelopes were returned by NASA to Worden, rather than the expected 60, but the 61st had no postal markings. For a full discussion of the number of covers, see Faries, pp. 29–31.)) were held by NASA during the investigation; Worden said he surrendered them at Kraft's request on the understanding they would be returned once the investigation was over, but the covers were transferred to the National Archives in August 1973. There was a Justice Department investigation into the covers. Its Criminal Division decided in 1974 that no prosecution was warranted, but the Civil Division the following year assumed the covers would be retained by the government. Kraft wrote, "it was questionable that any law had been broken and [the Justice Department] realized that dragging astronauts into court would not be a popular pastime."

In December 1978, the Justice Department issued a report indicating that while the government might have some claim to the Herrick covers (due to the appearance of having been made for profit), it probably did not have any claim to the 298 remaining covers, which the astronauts had said were intended as gifts. The department sent a secret memo to NASA that same year, effectively stating that the government took the covers without "any legal proceedings against the astronauts," and in the process "may have violated their constitutional rights," according to a press source in the Justice Department. In 1979, the department informed NASA that it had concluded that the government would likely lose if the astronauts sued for the covers. There was opposition among senators to the covers being returned, and in February 1980 Howard Cannon of Nevada introduced a joint resolution that the government should keep the covers because of their commercialization and advise the attorney general to "defend any civic action brought" regarding them. It passed the Senate but died in the House of Representatives.

In February 1983, Worden sued, alleging NASA violated the Constitution by seizing the covers without a hearing. At this time, the Justice Department reminded NASA of its 1978 secret memo. The government concluded NASA either approved the covers or knew they would be aboard Apollo 15 and, in an out-of-court settlement, returned all the envelopes to the three astronauts in July 1983. The settlement was finalized on July 15, with the government agreeing to release the covers unconditionally, whereupon Worden's legal counsel would terminate the suit. That same year, NASA announced plans to fly about 260,000 postal covers aboard the Space Shuttle STS-8 mission, with the U.S. Postal Service to sell them and split the profits with NASA; Worden remarked in his 2011 memoirs that he was amused by this, pointing out that NASA's covers were intended for "unabashed commercial exploitation".

In July 1983, the Associated Press reported on the government's return of the covers, describing how the Justice Department "decided it had no grounds for fighting" the suit and that Worden had agreed to dismiss it, with the 359 envelopes returned. Justice Department lawyer John Seibert stated that NASA had either authorized the envelopes or knew they would be carried into space. The Justice Department read a statement to The Washington Post, printed July 29, explaining how in its decision to return the 61 covers claimed by Worden, it also chose to return the other 298 that Scott and Irwin carried, dividing the latter equally between all three men. Worden's lawyer, James Fleming, said the astronauts were "very happy" with the result. Lawyers also said the three men agreed among themselves not to sell the covers right away, keeping them as mementos and reminders of what had happened. In 2013, Corey S. Powell and Laurie Gwen Shapiro of Slate magazine suggested that the 1978 investigation "largely exonerated" the astronauts, and opined that the return of the covers in 1983 effectively rescinded the accusations.

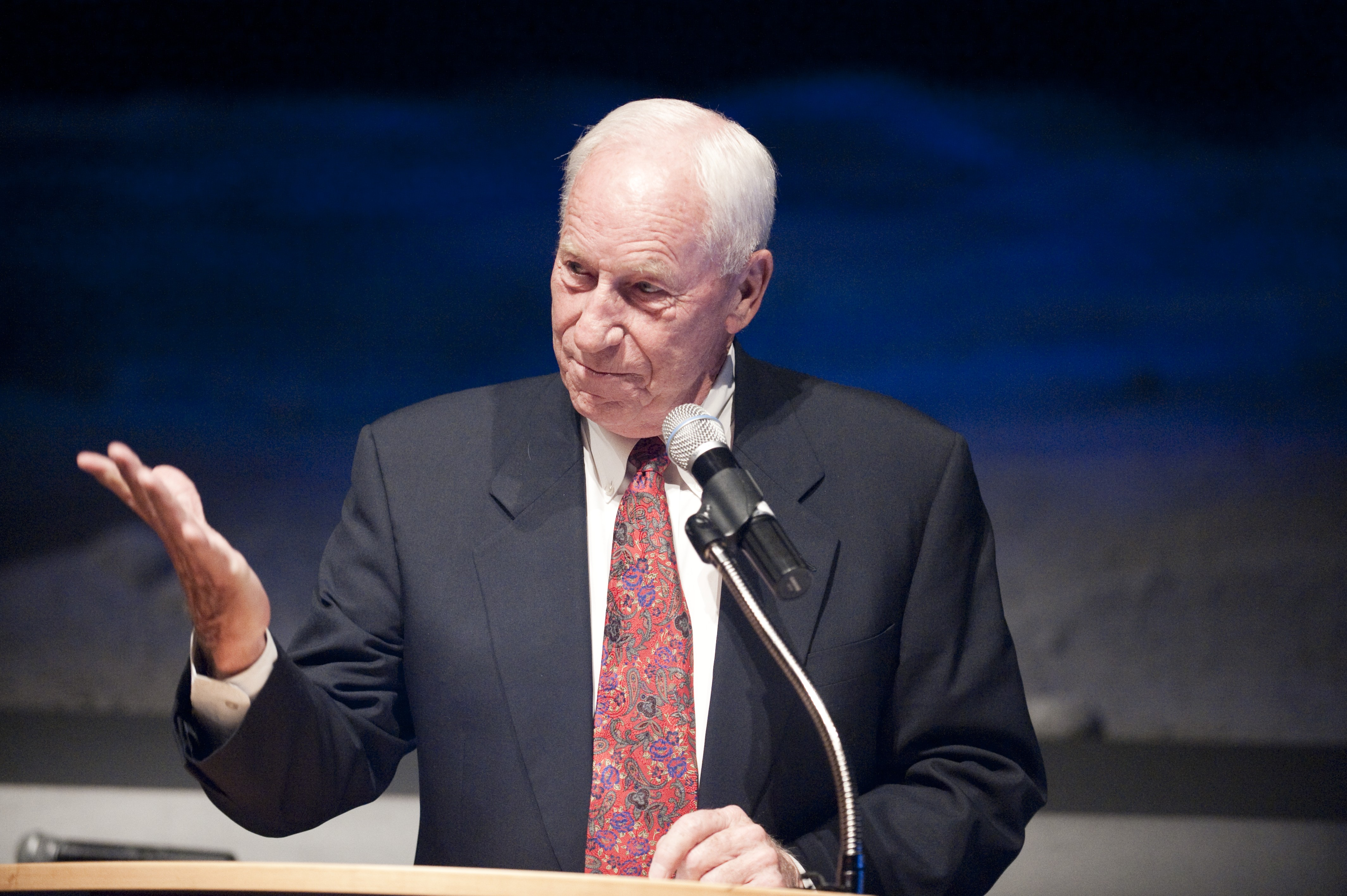
Worden in 2009, receiving NASA's Ambassador of Exploration award, recognizing his contributions to the space program

Some of the covers were later sold by the astronauts. One of the group of 298 covers impounded by the government and owned by Scott sold at the January 2008 Novaspace auction for $15,000 (equivalent to $22,000 in 2025). A Sieger cover sold in 2014 for over $55,000 (equivalent to $75,000 in 2025), the highest auction price to that point—the auctioneer noted that it was one of only four Sieger covers to come to public sale since the initial distribution. Worden sold many of the returned Herrick covers to pay debts from his unsuccessful 1982 run for Congress. When asked in 2011 where the covers were, he said, "Lord only knows. Some of them sold, some of them are still in a safety deposit box. They're probably all over the world by now." In his memoir, Worden expressed remorse at what had happened, writing: "Even if I didn't break any formal rules, in hindsight I had broken an unspoken trust." In a 2013 interview with Scott, Slate found that "he's vexed by lingering inaccuracies in the Wikipedia entry about the incidents. We ask: Why didn't he get a friend to log in and correct the entries? He responds with a startled pause. 'Is that right? I didn't know you could do that!'" (Note: Link to the version of this article as of the date of publication in Slate)

== Summary of covers ==
| Carried by | Total produced and approval status | Cachet | Cancellation | Notes |
|---|---|---|---|---|
| Scott | 100 (unauthorized) | Mission logo | 7/26/1971 at KSC; 8/7/1971 USS Okinawa | "Sieger covers": Notarized, handwritten statement in upper left. Carried to lunar surface. |
| Scott | 298 (unauthorized) | Mission logo | 7/26/1971 at KSC; 8/7/1971 USS Okinawa | Not notarized, printed endorsement in upper left. Carried to lunar surface. |
| Worden | 144 (authorized) | "Phases of the Moon" | 8/7/1971 USS Okinawa | "Herrick covers": Carried in command module. |
| Worden | 1 (authorized) | "First Flight" | 12/17/1928 Jackson, MI | Carried in command module. Autographed by Orville Wright. |
| Irwin | 87 (authorized) | Apollo 12 | 12/10/1969 Houston, TX | Carried in command module. Signed by Apollo 12 astronauts. |
| Irwin | 8 (authorized) | Shamrock and lunar rover | various, most 9/29/1971 at KSC | Carried in command module. |
| Irwin | 1 (authorized) | "Flown to the Moon" | Not canceled | Carried in command module. |
| NASA | 1 (authorized) | | 8/2/1971 on lunar surface | USPS cover: Carried in lunar module. Now in National Postal Museum. |
| NASA | 1 (authorized) | | Not canceled | USPS backup cover: Carried in command module. |

== See also ==
- Apollo insurance covers – unflown covers created by Apollo astronauts for sale by their families if they died while on the mission.
- Robbins medallions – space-flown medallions from the Gemini and Apollo flights.
- U.S. space exploration history on U.S. stamps § Space Achievement Decade Issue of 1971 (Apollo 15 mission commemorated)
- The Man Who Sold the Moon – Robert Heinlein's 1950 novella about a privately funded lunar mission paid for, in part, by covers to be taken to the Moon.

== Sources ==
- American Air Mail Catalogue. Vol. 5 (5th ed.). Washington, DC: American Air Mail Society (AAMS). 1974. OCLC 63013465.
- Chaikin, Andrew (1995) [1994]. A Man on the Moon: The Voyages of the Apollo Astronauts. New York: Penguin Books. ISBN 978-0-14-024146-4.
- Faries, Belmont (September 1983). "NASA Returns Moon Covers to the Apollo 15 Astronauts". Society of Philatelic Americans Journal: 27–32.
- Fletcher, James C. (July 27, 1972). "Letter from James C. Fletcher to Clinton P. Anderson". (exhibit to August 3, 1972, committee hearing).
- Fletcher, James C. (August 2, 1972). "Letter from James C. Fletcher to Clinton P. Anderson". (exhibit to August 3, 1972, committee hearing).
- Irwin, James B.; Emerson, William A. Jr. (1982) [1973]. To Rule the Night: The Discovery Voyage of Astronaut Jim Irwin. Nashville, TN: Broadman Press. ISBN 978-0-8054-7227-1.
- Jurek, Richard (2019). The Ultimate Engineer: The Remarkable Life of NASA's Visionary Leader George M. Low. Lincoln, NE: University of Nebraska Press. ISBN 978-1-4962-1847-6.
- Kraft, Christopher (2001). Flight: My Life in Mission Control. New York: Dutton. ISBN 978-0-525-94571-0.
- Lewis, Richard S. (1974). The Voyages of Apollo: The Exploration of the Moon. New York: Quadrangle/The New York Times Book Co. ISBN 978-0-8129-0477-2.
- National Aeronautics and Space Administration (1972). "Chronology of 144 Authorized Covers". (exhibit to August 3, 1972, committee hearing).
- National Aeronautics and Space Administration (1972). "Chronology of 400 Unauthorized Covers". (exhibit to August 3, 1972, committee hearing).
- National Aeronautics and Space Administration (1972). "Management Chronology". (exhibit to August 3, 1972, committee hearing).
- Ramkissoon, Reuben A. (2006), "An Astrophilatelic Rendering of the Conquest of Space: Part 3, Project Apollo – the Moon Landing Missions", The Congress Book 2006, State College, PA: American Philatelic Congress, Inc., pp. 191–221
- Scott, David; Leonov, Alexei (2004). Two Sides of the Moon: Our Story of the Cold War Space Race. New York: Thomas Dunne Books. ISBN 978-0-7434-5067-6.
- Slayton, Deke; Cassutt, Michael (2011) [1994]. Deke! (First E-book ed.). New York: Forge. ISBN 978-1-466-80214-8.
- Ulman, Leon (1981), "78-64 Memorandum Opinion for the Assistant Attorney General, Civil Division", in Ulman, Leon (ed.), Opinions of the Office of Legal Counsel (January 11, 1978 – December 31, 1978), vol. 2, Washington, DC: United States Government Printing Office, pp. 281–289, ISBN 978-0-936502-00-7
- United States Senate Committee on Aeronautics and Space Sciences (August 3, 1972). "Commercialization of Items Carried by Astronauts". United States Senate.
- Winick, Les (1973). "The Apollo 15 Cover Story". COMPEX. Combined Philatelic Exhibition of Chicagoland, Inc.: 71–89.
- Worden, Al; French, Francis (2011). Falling to Earth: An Apollo 15 Astronaut's Journey to the Moon. Washington, DC: Smithsonian Books. ISBN 978-1-58834-310-9.
- Worden, Al; French, Francis (2021). The Light of Earth: Reflections on a Life in Space (eBook ed.). Lincoln, NE: University of Nebraska Press. ISBN 978-1-4962-2865-9.
