= Astrophilately =

Intersection of space and postal history

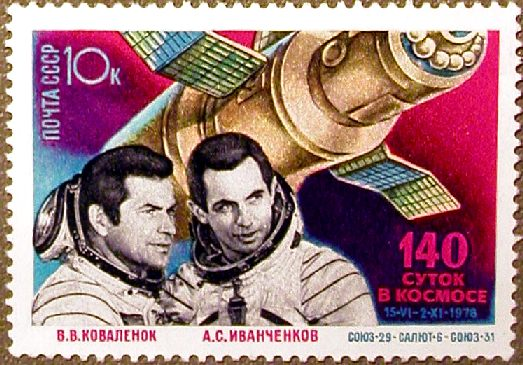
Soviet 1978 stamp commemorating Vladimir Kovalyonok and Aleksandr Ivanchenkov's new space-endurance record of 140 days onboard Salyut 6

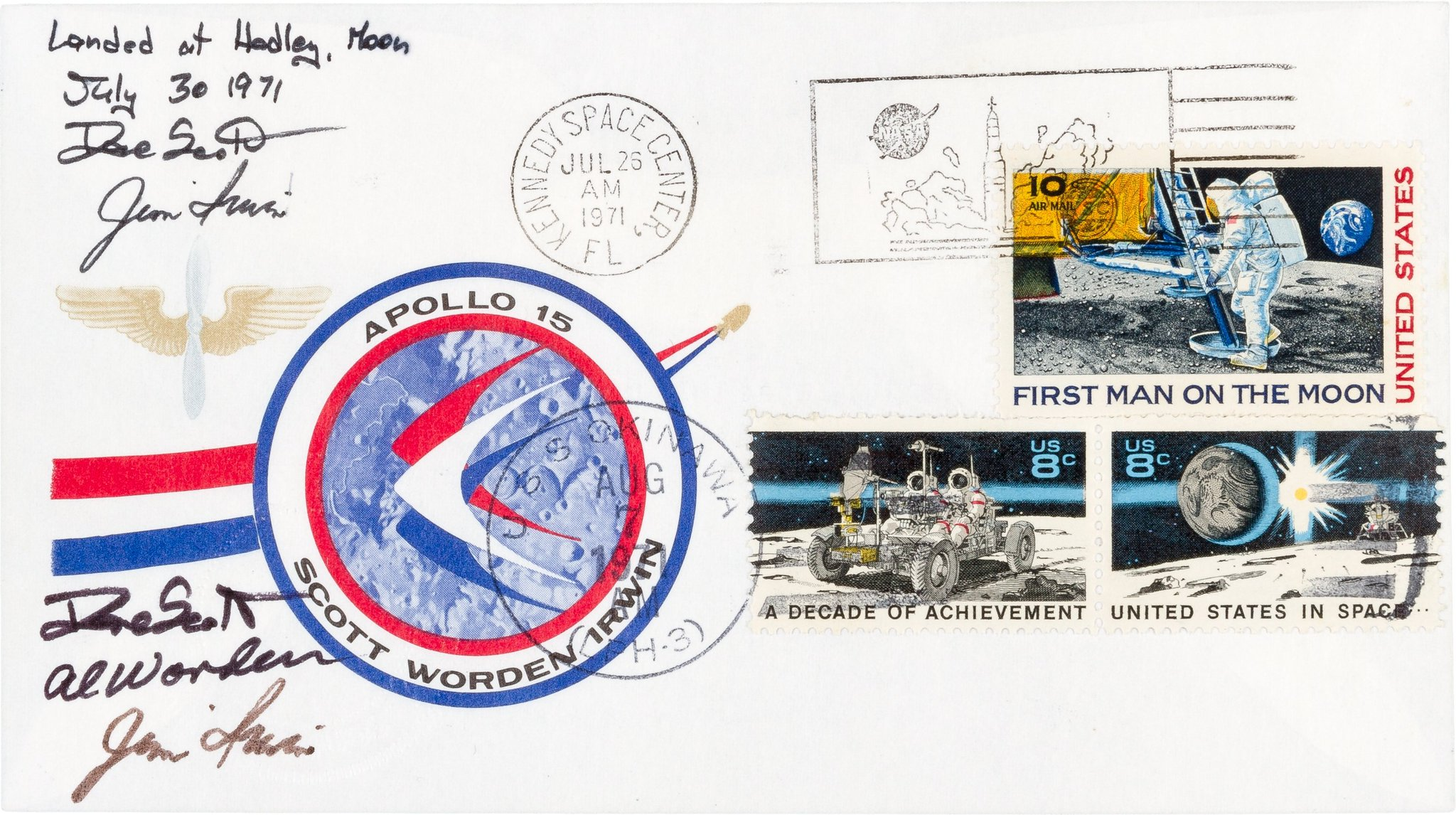
One of the so-called "Sieger covers" that were taken to the Moon and back by the US astronauts flying the Apollo 15 mission

Astrophilately is a branch of philately which deals with the collection of stamps and postmarked envelopes related to spaceflight. It is the intersection of space and postal history. Envelopes postmarked on significant dates and at a post office near the controlling agency are used in postal exhibits to share the development and conquest of the cosmos.

== Scope ==
Topics of interest include postage stamps, cancellations, and covers connected to various projects. Examples include rocket mail, dating from as early as the 1928, and mail actually carried on space flights, a practice that began with Project Apollo missions, and has continued since then. Specialists distinguish astrophilately from topical collecting with a space theme; astrophilatelic items are those with direct connections to space missions, whether or not they include any special pictorial depiction.

The Fédération Internationale de Philatélie has a Section for Astrophilately. Included are covers and cards cancelled at launch sites, tracking stations, Mission Control facilities, research laboratories, and recovery ships. Many, though not all, such items have cachets produced for the mission; others are recognizable only with specific knowledge of the postmark location and date corresponding to a launch.

== Collecting ==
As with regular airmail, items of mail carried aboard spacecraft are known as "flown covers". They are known from both Soviet- and American-flown missions. While some types are rare, others, such as Space Shuttle covers, were carried in large numbers, and are thus relatively common, costing less than US$50.

Perhaps the most common item of astrophilately is the "STS-8 flight cover". In cooperation with the USPS, the Space Shuttle Challenger flight STS-8 carried eight Getaway Special canisters full of postal covers franked with $9.35 express mail stamps, which were then sold to the public after the shuttle's return. The original plan was to carry 500,000, but the final number was reduced to 261,900, of which 2,523 were damaged during the flight and discarded. The remaining covers were each enclosed in a souvenir folder describing the mission and the cover, and sold for $15.35 each. They were sold out by November 1983, just a few months after the flight.

Much rarer are the "Sieger" covers, carried on Apollo 15. German stamp dealer Hermann Sieger had arranged a deal, in which H. Walter Eierman convinced the Apollo 15 crew members to carry 100 cacheted covers to the moon and back, for the sum of US$7000 each, with the understanding that they would not be sold until after the end of the Apollo program. These covers, along with an additional 300 that the crew would keep for themselves, were stuffed in David Scott's spacesuit pocket, and never listed on the manifest. However, Sieger began selling the covers he received soon after the mission's return, reportedly for $1500 each, and when the whole affair came to light, NASA confiscated the astronauts' 298 surviving covers (two had been destroyed pre-flight), and grounded them permanently. In 1983, hearing of the STS-8 plans, astronaut Alfred Worden sued for the return of the 298 covers, and the crew eventually recovered them. The covers have appeared on the market from time to time since then. In an October 2000 auction, one of the crew covers realized US$14,950.

== See also ==
- Rocket mail
