= F. Herrick Herrick =

American film director and philatelist (1902–1987)

- Born: March 25, 1902; Beloit, Wisconsin, U.S.
- Died: August 11, 1987 (aged 85); Saginaw, Michigan, U.S.
- Occupation(s): Film director, producer, writer, actor; philatelist, numismatist

F. Herrick Herrick (March 25, 1902 – August 11, 1987) was an American film director and philatelist.

== Career ==
Herrick began to direct short films in 1925, and within a year The Moving Picture World magazine wrote that he was poised to become "one of the leading film directors on the East Coast". While an independent director and producer, he did most of his work for studios such as Tec-Art, which wrote to the Motion Picture Producers and Distributors of America in 1927 that "the motion picture industry would be well rid of Mr F. Herrick Herrick and although he did not leave owing us any great amount of money it was perhaps through our being rather cautious." He frequently produced short travel documentary subjects, including some entries in the "Vagabond Adventure" travelogue series for Pathé Exchange and RKO Pictures in the early 1930s. His movies were frequently filmed in Florida, and many of the short documentary subjects involved fishing.

In 1935, he wrote and directed Obeah!, a horror film which was among the first to be filmed in Jamaica. He was a founding member of the Screen Directors Guild when it was established in 1936, and served as its first Executive Secretary, until he was replaced by Jack McGowan in 1938.

== Personal life ==
By 1971, Herrick had retired from film and lived in Florida, where he had become friends with several Apollo astronauts. He was also an avid stamp collector, an interest that he had begun to develop in the 1930s and had directed a short film about in 1939. During preparations for Apollo 15, he asked astronaut Alfred Worden to carry 144 postal covers to the Moon and bring them back for sale. In addition to other postal covers carried on the mission, the commercialization of Herrick's covers resulted in the Apollo 15 postal covers incident, and the astronauts were effectively fired from NASA. Worden later described Herrick in his old age as "a cross between Santa Claus and everyone's favorite grandfather", but admitted he should never have taken the offer: "I was too old to believe in Santa Claus."

In his retirement, Herrick wrote columns for the San Francisco Bulletin, the Los Angeles Examiner, the Boston Telegram and the London Express, and narrated a local television show in Miami, Ports of Call on WPLG-TV channel 10. Herrick died in Saginaw, Michigan in 1987.
