= Linn's Stamp News =

US magazine

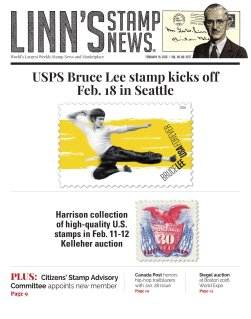
- Editor-in-Chief: Jay Bigalke
- Categories: Hobby magazine
- Frequency: Weekly
- Publisher: Scott Stamp LLC
- Founder: George W. Linn
- Founded: 1928
- Company: Scott Stamp LLC
- Country: United States
- Based in: Troy, Ohio
- Language: English
- Website: www.linns.com
- ISSN: 0161-6234

Linn's Stamp News is an American weekly magazine for stamp collectors. It is published by Scott Stamp LLC, which also publishes the Scott Standard Postage Stamp Catalogue, the Scott Specialized Catalogue of United States Stamps and Covers, and the Scott Classic Specialized Catalogue of Stamps and Covers 1840–1940. Linn's was founded in 1928 by George W. Linn as Linn's Weekly Stamp News.

In October 2025, Scott Stamp LLC acquired Linn's Stamp News, Scott Stamp Monthly, and the Scott catalog publishing business from Amos Media Co.

== History ==
Linn's Stamp News was founded in 1928 by George W. Linn as Linn's Weekly Stamp News. The publication became one of the leading sources of philatelic news, research, and market information for stamp collectors in the United States and internationally.

During the 1980s, the magazine had a circulation of 75,000 copies, making it the largest philatelic magazine. In 1987, it had a staff of ten and correspondents in London and Washington.

During the late 20th century, Linn's became part of Amos Press, later known as Amos Media Co., which also acquired the Scott catalog publishing business and other philatelic publications. Under Amos ownership, Linn's expanded its print and digital offerings and became closely associated with the Scott catalogs.

In 2023, Amos Media announced changes to its philatelic publishing program. Linn's Stamp News moved to a combination of print and digital editions, while the monthly publication Linn's Stamp News Monthly resumed publication under the title Scott Stamp Monthly.

In October 2025, Scott Stamp LLC acquired Linn's Stamp News, Scott Stamp Monthly, the Scott catalog publishing business, and related philatelic assets from Amos Media Co. Following the acquisition, publishing operations were relocated to Troy, Ohio.

== Description ==
Linn's Stamp News covers news and information related to philately, including new stamp issues, postal history, auctions, collecting research, market developments, and activities of postal administrations and philatelic organizations around the world.

The publication includes news reporting, feature articles, opinion columns, market analysis, collecting guidance, auction coverage, and calendars of stamp shows and other philatelic events.

== Scott Stamp Monthly ==
In 2023, Amos Media restored the title Scott Stamp Monthly for its monthly philatelic publication, replacing Linn's Stamp News Monthly.

Scott Stamp Monthly contains feature articles, collecting research, auction coverage, market analysis, and information related to the Scott catalogs.

== Publication changes ==
In 2023, Amos Media announced changes to the publication schedule of Linn's Stamp News. Beginning March 6, 2023, the publication expanded to 52 issues per year, with a combination of print and digital editions, and restored the Scott Stamp Monthly title for its monthly magazine.

In August 2024, Linn's Stamp News switched to a digital only format.

In October 2025, Scott Stamp LLC acquired Linn's Stamp News, Scott Stamp Monthly, the Scott catalog publishing business, and related philatelic assets from Amos Media Co.

In October 2026, Scott Stamp LLC announced the return to a weekly publication schedule for the print edition of Linn's Stamp News.

== See also ==
- George Ward Linn
