= Cachet =

Commemorative inscription on postage

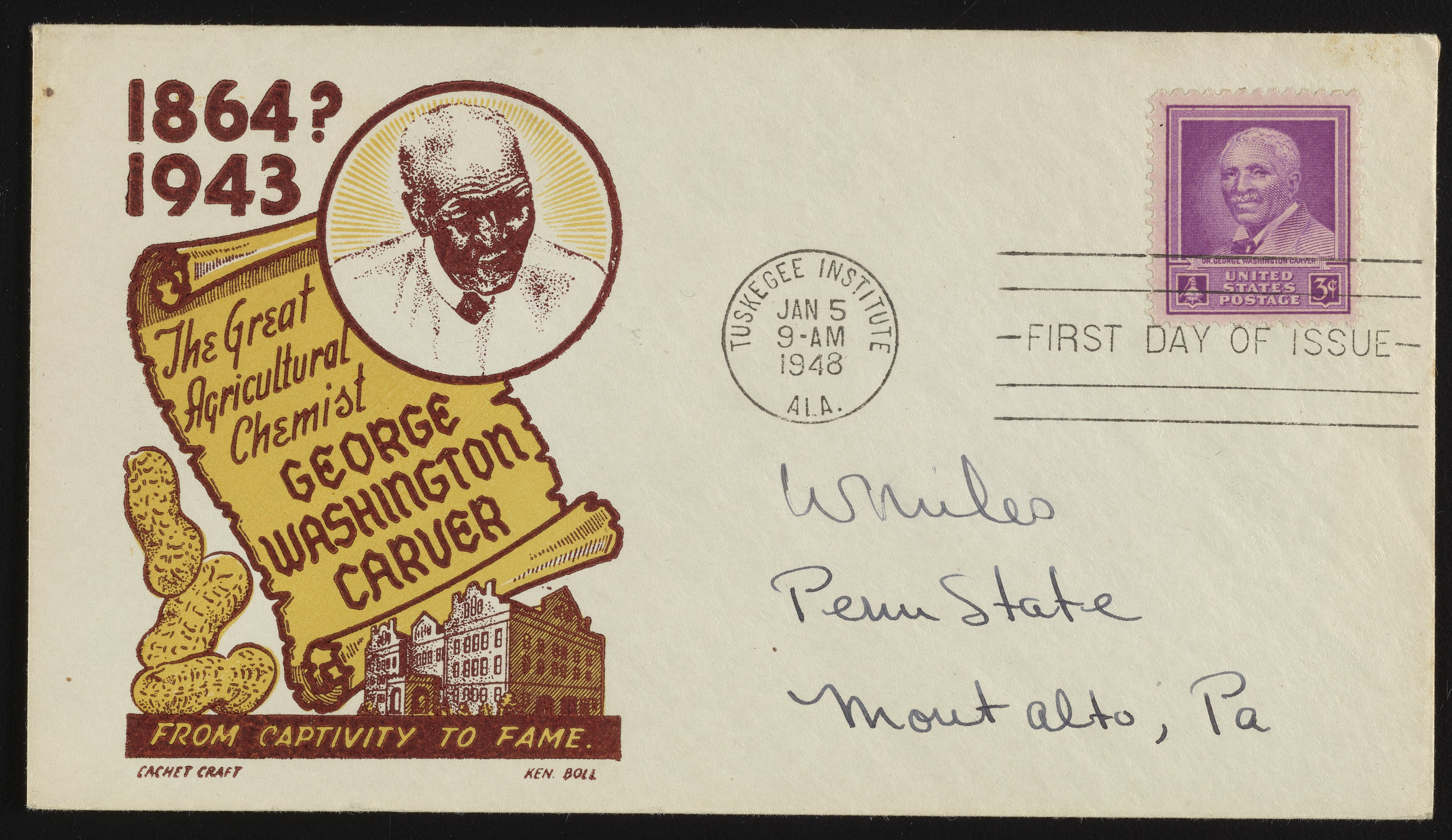
A cachet (on the left) commemorating George Washington Carver on a first day cover issued in the United States

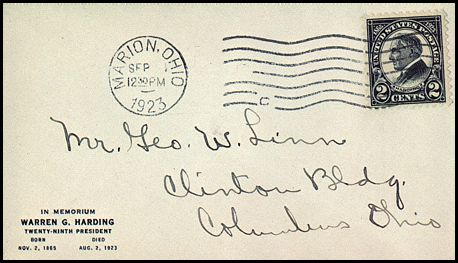
George W. Linn's cachet (in the lower left corner) on Harding Memorial issue

In philately, a cachet (French pronunciation: [kaʃe]) is a printed or stamped design or inscription, other than a cancellation or pre-printed postage, on an envelope, postcard, or postal card to commemorate a postal or philatelic event. There are both official and private (independent of postal authorities) cachets. They commemorate everything from the first flight on a particular route, to the Super Bowl. Cachets are also frequently made, either by private companies or a government, for first day of issue stamp events or "second-day" stamp events. They are often present on event covers.

The first cacheted FDC (first day cover) was produced by prominent philatelist and cachet maker George Ward Linn in 1923, for the Warren G. Harding memorial stamp issue.

Cachet-making is considered an art form, and cachets may be produced by using any number of methods, including drawing or painting directly onto the envelope, serigraphy, block printing, lithography, engraving, laser printing, attachment of photographs or other paper memorabilia, etc. Frequently, flight cachets (which have also been used in space and on the moon) are rubber-stamped.

The largest and best-known cachet-making companies, which typically produce thousands or tens of thousands of printed cachets for U.S. stamp issues, are ArtCraft (1939–2015), Artmaster, Fleetwood, House of Farnam, and Colorano.

== See also ==
- Cover (philately)
- Philatelic cover
