= Earliest reported postmark =

Philatelic terminology

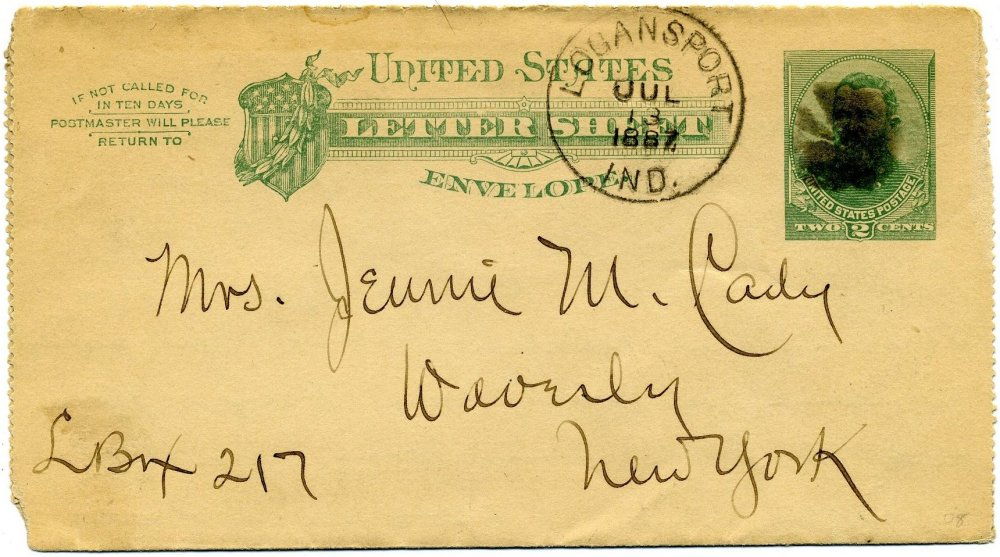
An example of an earliest reported postmark on a Grant letter sheet.

The term earliest reported postmark or ERP is a term used by the United Postal Stationery Society (UPSS) for the past four or more decades. They have established a database in which the earliest postmarks on stamped envelopes or postal card or letter sheets is kept. Postmarks are typically dated from days to many months after the date of issuance. An envelope can come out in varying sizes, colors, or shapes without notification to the public. Collecting the earliest reported postmark for a particular variety is an ongoing effort.

An earliest reported postmark is different from the first day of issue where there is a first day of issue postmark and frequently a pictorial cancellation, indicating the city and date where the item was first issued. Although primarily a US undertaking, recently the UPSS has expanded the project to include the issues of Cuba during the US occupation (1898-1902) and the Republic (1902-1958).

Earliest reported postmarks are collected by the entire or cover (the entire envelope). The obvious reason for this is that an envelope's knife or size could not be determined if the specimen was a cut square or full corner, even if the entire postmark is retained.

Earliest reported postmarks are collected for postal cards as well. For the first fifty years of postal card use there was no "first day of issue" as we now know it. Cards would not necessarily be available on any announced day as postmasters were ordered to exhaust existing supplies before ordering more. Previous to 1926, earliest reported postmarks exist up to several months after announced availability dates.
