= Apollo insurance covers =

Mementos from Apollo space missions

The Apollo insurance covers are autographed postal covers signed by the astronaut crews prior to their mission. The primary motivation behind this action was the refusal of life insurance companies to provide coverage for the astronauts. Consequently, the astronauts devised a strategy involving the signing of hundreds of postal covers. These were to be left behind for their families, who could then sell them in the event of the astronauts' deaths. The insurance covers began with Apollo 11 and ended with Apollo 16.

== Background ==
The ability of astronauts to obtain much life insurance was limited, so they signed hundreds of postal covers before they left, on the presumption that they would become highly valuable in the event of their death. The crew would designate a trusted ally with the covers who would then have them cancelled at the Kennedy Space Center (KSC) post office on the day of launch and/or on the day of the lunar landing.

Apollo 11 insurance covers normally fetch the highest prices because it was the first lunar landing mission.

There are three varieties of the Apollo 11 covers, four of Apollo 12, two of Apollo 13, two of Apollo 14, one of Apollo 15, and one of Apollo 16. Some astronauts also left behind single signed covers for their families.

The two producers of the mission covers were The Manned Spacecraft Center Stamp Club in Houston, Texas (the MSCSC Covers) and a friend of the astronauts, Al Bishop (the "Bishop Covers"). Especially in the case of the MSCSC Covers, there are many of the exact covers that the stamp collectors also obtained through the club. These were also crew signed, but many after the mission, which makes them not an insurance cover. The essence of a true insurance cover is the fact that it was signed while in quarantine prior to launch and that it was one of those that were left behind for the crew families in the event of disaster. In order to be certain that a cover is a genuine insurance cover, it must originate from one of the crew members or their families. Ideally, the reverse of the cover should be certified by one of the crew.

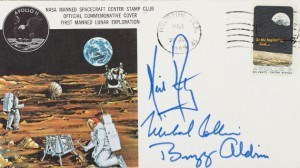
Buzz Aldrin's Apollo 11 insurance cover, postmarked July 20, 1969, and signed by Neil Armstrong, Michael Collins, and Buzz Aldrin

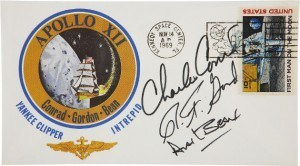
Alan Bean's Apollo 12 insurance cover, postmarked November 14, 1969, and signed by Charles Conrad, Richard Gordon, and Alan Bean

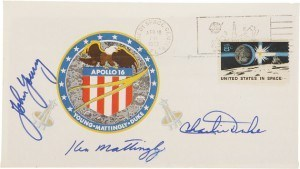
John Young's Apollo 16 insurance cover, postmarked April 16, 1972, and signed by John Young, Ken Mattingly, and Charlie Duke

== See also ==
- Apollo 15 postal covers incident
