= Event cover =

Stamp cover celebrating an event or anniversary

Event covers are a type of stamp covers (decorated, stamped and canceled commemorative envelopes) that are created to celebrate an event or note an anniversary.

A design (called a "cachet") is generally placed on the left side of the envelope (although there are also "all over" cachets). It explains what is being commemorated on what date and generally also includes an illustration page.

Ideally, the stamps used relate to the celebration (for instance, space stamps for a shuttle launch). Cancels can often be obtained in the city of the event (such as Kitty Hawk for the Wright Brothers first flight anniversary). In the United States, larger quantities can be obtained from a special cancellation unit maintained by the Postal Service in Kansas City, Missouri. If a special cancellation (one with a design) has been created for a particular event, the cancel can generally only be received from the local post office involved in the event.

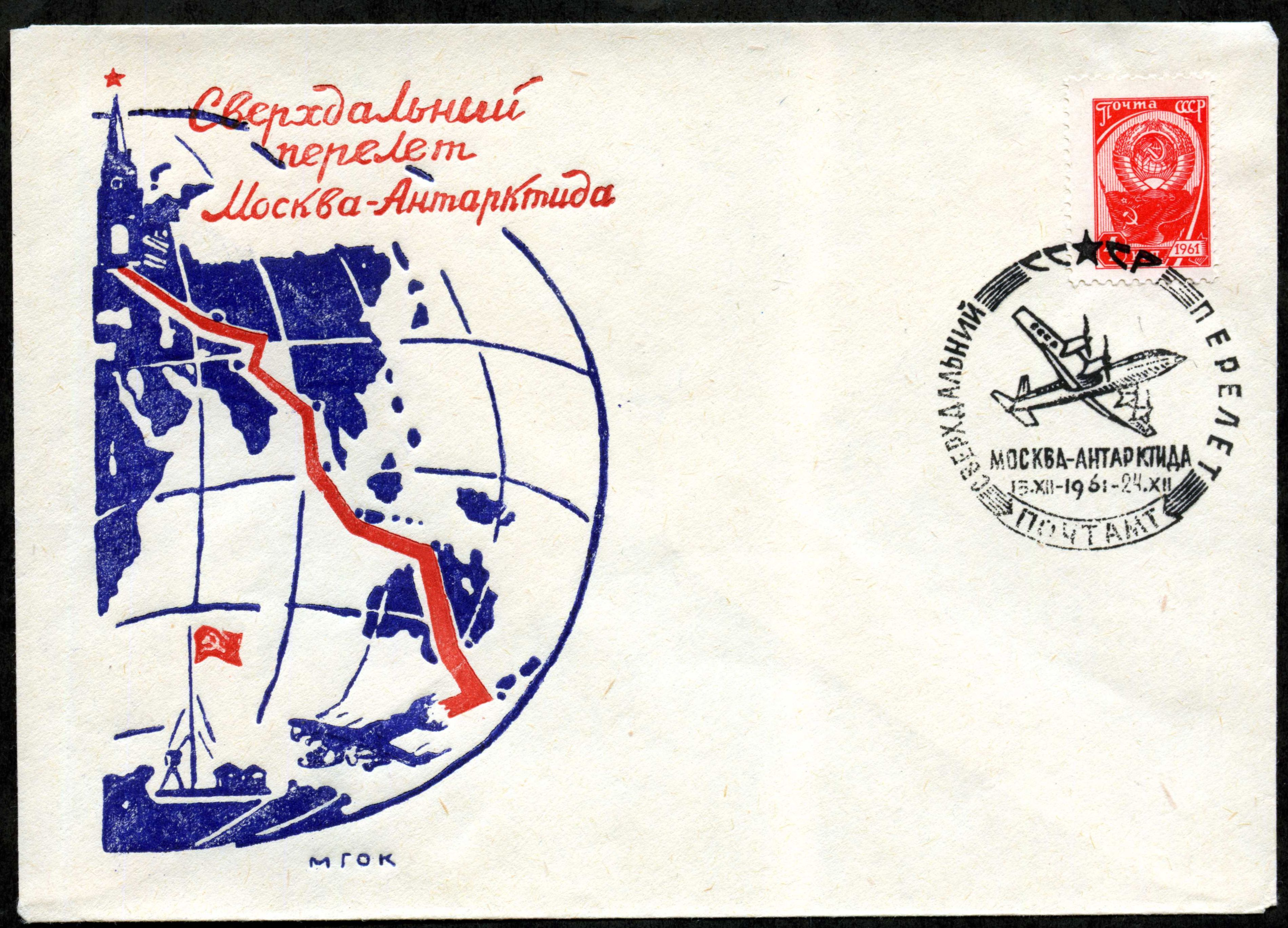
Soviet special event cover celebrating "Non stop flight from Moscow to Antarctic" (1961)

One example of a special event cover was issued in 1985 by the Isle of Man Philatelic Bureau to mark the anniversary of the aircraft Douglas DC-3, which was of interest, not only because of the high volume of air mail handled by DC-3 Dakotas at that time, but also the link between the names of Douglas, Isle of Man, and Dakota—Douglas DC-3. A 26p stamp was specially issued by the Isle of Man and a special handstamp was also created for these covers, which was deliberately created with a Dakota flying "free" and not boxed in. The envelope was also officially acknowledged by the McDonnell Douglas company and bore their official DC3 logo in the bottom right of the Envelope.

The earliest recognized event covers were presidential inauguration covers, which were first created in the early part of the 20th century. Event cover creation and collecting is considered part of the first day cover hobby, which creates decorated covers to commemorate the issuance of stamps. (The stamp hobby calls envelopes "covers" because letters were originally simply wrapped in a blank piece of paper or "cover".)

Event covers can include mail that was aboard aircraft that flew the mail between two points, usually large cities, for the first time, however these covers are usually referred to as First flight covers by collectors.

== See also ==
- First day of issue
- Cancellation (mail)
- Apollo 15 postal covers incident
