= George Ward Linn =

American philatelist

- Born: February 7, 1884
- Died: March 28, 1966 (aged 82)
- Engineering career
- Institutions: American Philatelic Society
- Projects: Founded Linn's Weekly Stamp News in 1928; created the first pre-printed cacheted first day cover
- Awards: APS Hall of Fame

George Ward Linn (February 7, 1884 – March 28, 1966), of Ohio, was a philatelist who published philatelic literature extensively and was the founder of Linn's Weekly Stamp News in 1928, the philatelic journal for which he is most famous.

== Philatelic publishing ==
The son of a printer and publisher, and with a strong interest in philately, George Linn published numerous journals devoted to the hobby of stamp collecting. These included The Columbian in 1901, The Columbian Philatelist, from 1901 to 1907, Stamp News in 1909, and The Stamp Collector from 1909 to 1911.

The Stamp Collector's Journal had eight volumes beginning in 1910 and was first known as Linn's Way.

Linn began publishing philatelic handbooks including works on Mexican and American philately beginning circa 1910. These include The Making of United States Stamps [1913], Mexico: the White and Green Seal Issues of Sonora [1916], The War Stamps of Mexico [1917] and The Paid Markings on the 3 cent U.S. Stamp of 1861 [1955]. Linn wrote the above works except for the 1913 work; author is Frank E. Goodwin.

Linn's Linprint imprint published Linprint's Catalog of Philatelic Labels in 1940.

Linn also published a stamp album Stamps of the World.

== Philatelic activity ==
Linn was, at times, a stamp dealer and conducted stamp auctions. However, he was most interested in promoting stamp collecting and in the creation of stamp clubs. He attended most of the American Philatelic Society stamp shows and conventions held during his lifetime and created philatelic souvenirs for them.

Linn is remembered by first day cover collectors for creating the first pre-printed cacheted first day cover. This cover commemorated the passing of President Warren G. Harding, and featured the use of the black 2-cent "mourning stamp" (Scott No. 610) issued September 1, 1923.

== Honors and awards ==
Because of his dedication to advancing the hobby of stamp collecting, he was named to the American Philatelic Society Hall of Fame in 1967.

The ASDA or American Stamp Dealers Association placed Linn in its Hall of Fame in 2013.

== Legacy ==
Linn's Weekly Stamp News continues to be printed to this day (as of 2017), and subscribers can read it online.

== See also ==
- Philately
- Philatelic literature
