= First day of issue =

Postage stamp franked on earliest date

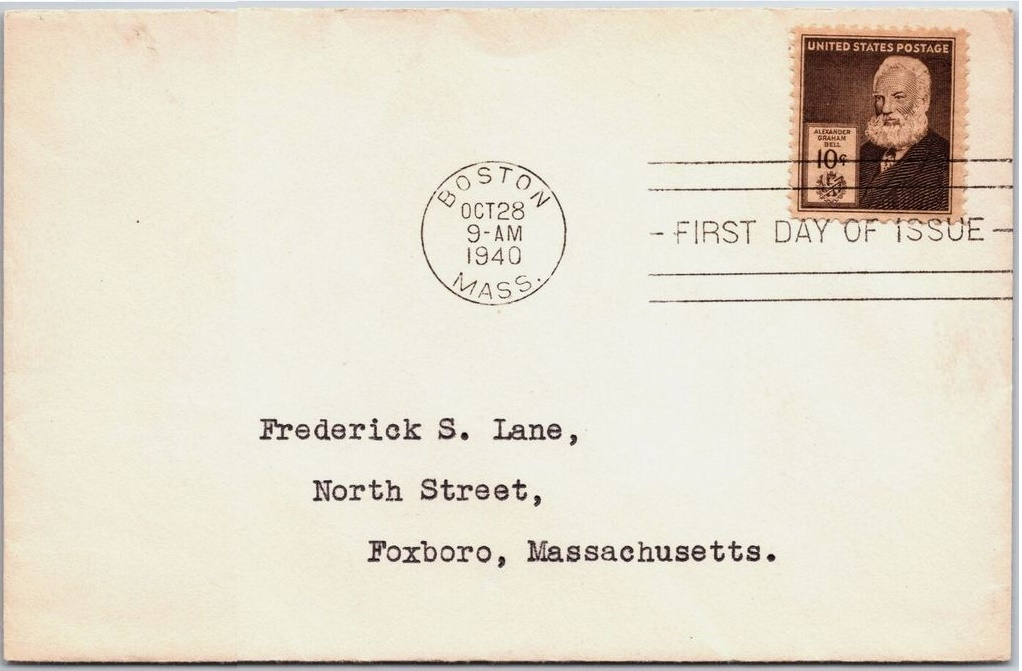
First day cover of the Alexander Graham Bell issue of 1940

A first day of issue cover or first day cover (FDC) is a postage stamp on a cover, postal card or stamped envelope that has been franked on the first day the issue is authorized for use within the country or territory of the stamp-issuing authority. There will usually be a first day of issue postmark, frequently a pictorial cancellation, indicating the city and date where the item was first issued, and this postmark often features the words "first day of issue."

Modern FDCs typically also feature a "cachet," or an illustration on the envelope. This can be printed, drawn, or painted by any number of methods, and is typically related to the image or subject on the stamp. Many collectors seek out covers produced by particular cachetmakers for their artistic value.

Postal authorities may hold a first day ceremony to generate publicity for the new issue, with postal officials revealing the stamp, and with connected persons in attendance, such as descendants of the person being honored by the stamp. The ceremony may also be held in a location that has a special connection with the stamp's subject, such as the birthplace of a social movement, or at a stamp show.

Depending on the policy of the nation issuing the stamp, official first day postmarks may sometimes be applied to covers weeks or months after the date indicated. Sometimes the issue is made from a temporary or permanent foreign or overseas office. Covers that are postmarked at sea or their next port of call will carry what is known as a paquebot postmark.

== History ==
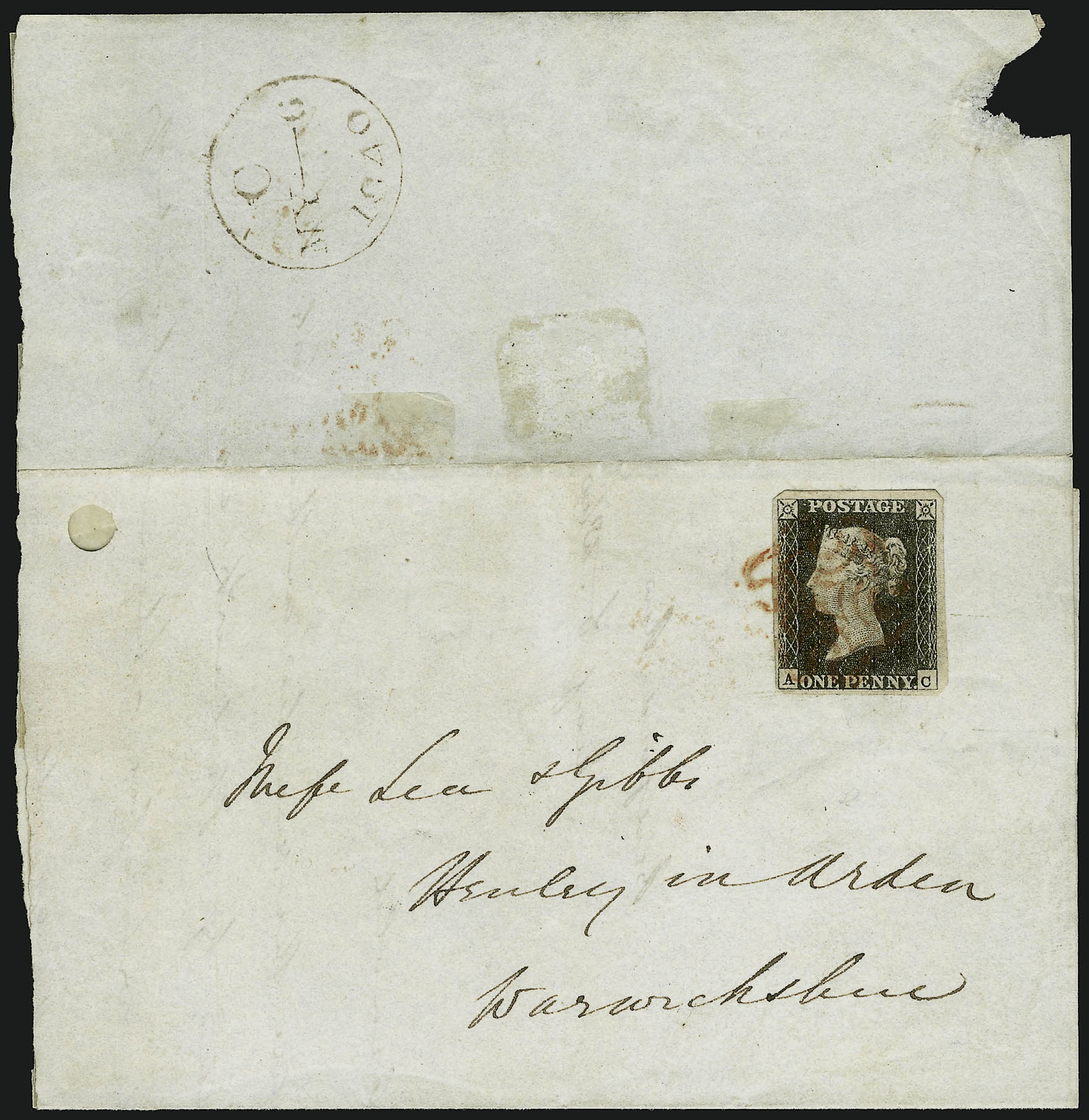
First day cover of the world's first postage stamp, the Penny Black, used on May 6, 1840 is verified by the datestamp on the backflap

In England, prior to 1840, postage costs were very high and they were usually paid by the person who received the mail. The cost was measured by how many sheets were in the letter and how far the letter had to go. Sometimes this amounted to a very considerable sum. Sir Rowland Hill calculated that the cost to the Post Office was far less than what some people were paying to send/receive their mail; this figure was just a fraction of 1d. Hill believed that sending mail should be affordable to all so proposed that postage should be pre-paid, based on the weight rather than the number of sheets and the cost should be drastically reduced. On 10 January 1840 a Uniform 1d postmark was released which allowed a universal penny postage rate, this was a postmark that was paid and was applied when the letter was sent. It was later decided that an adhesive label should be used to prevent forgeries and mis-use of the postal service and the Penny Black stamp was born. It was officially released for sale on 6 May 1840; however, several post offices that received the stamps prior to that date released the stamps early. The city of Bath is known for having released the stamps on 2 May 1840. Here began the very first first day covers.

Philatelist and publisher George Linn made what are believed to be the first cacheted first day covers on Sept. 1, 1923, printing a simple text decoration with a black border on several envelopes, purchasing the stamps that were issued that day to honor U.S. president Warren G. Harding (shortly after his death in office), and having them postmarked.

== Types ==
=== Philatelic covers ===
Most modern first day covers are a type of philatelic cover— in other words, they are envelopes prepared with a stamp(s), addressed and sent through the mail delivery system with the intent of creating a collectible item. Information about philatelic covers is available online in catalogs and collector websites.

=== Event covers ===
Event covers, also known as commemorative covers, are a closely related kind of philatelic covers to FDCs. Instead of marking the issuance of a stamp, these covers commemorate events in history or current events: an inauguration, a birthday, or a big or small a milestone of any kind. The cachet on these covers typically explains the event or anniversary being celebrated, and ideally the stamp or stamps affixed relate to the event. Cancels are obtained either from a relevant location (e.g., Cape Canaveral, Anytown) or, in the case of the United States, from the Postal Service's Cancellation Services unit in Kansas City.

=== Other types ===
Computer vended postage stamps issued by Neopost had first-day-of-issue ceremonies sponsored by the company, not by an official stamp-issuing entity. Personalised postage stamps of different designs are sometimes also given first-day-of-issue ceremonies and cancellations by the private designer. The stamps issued by private local posts can also have first days of issue, as can artistamps.

== Features of a cover ==
=== Postmark ===
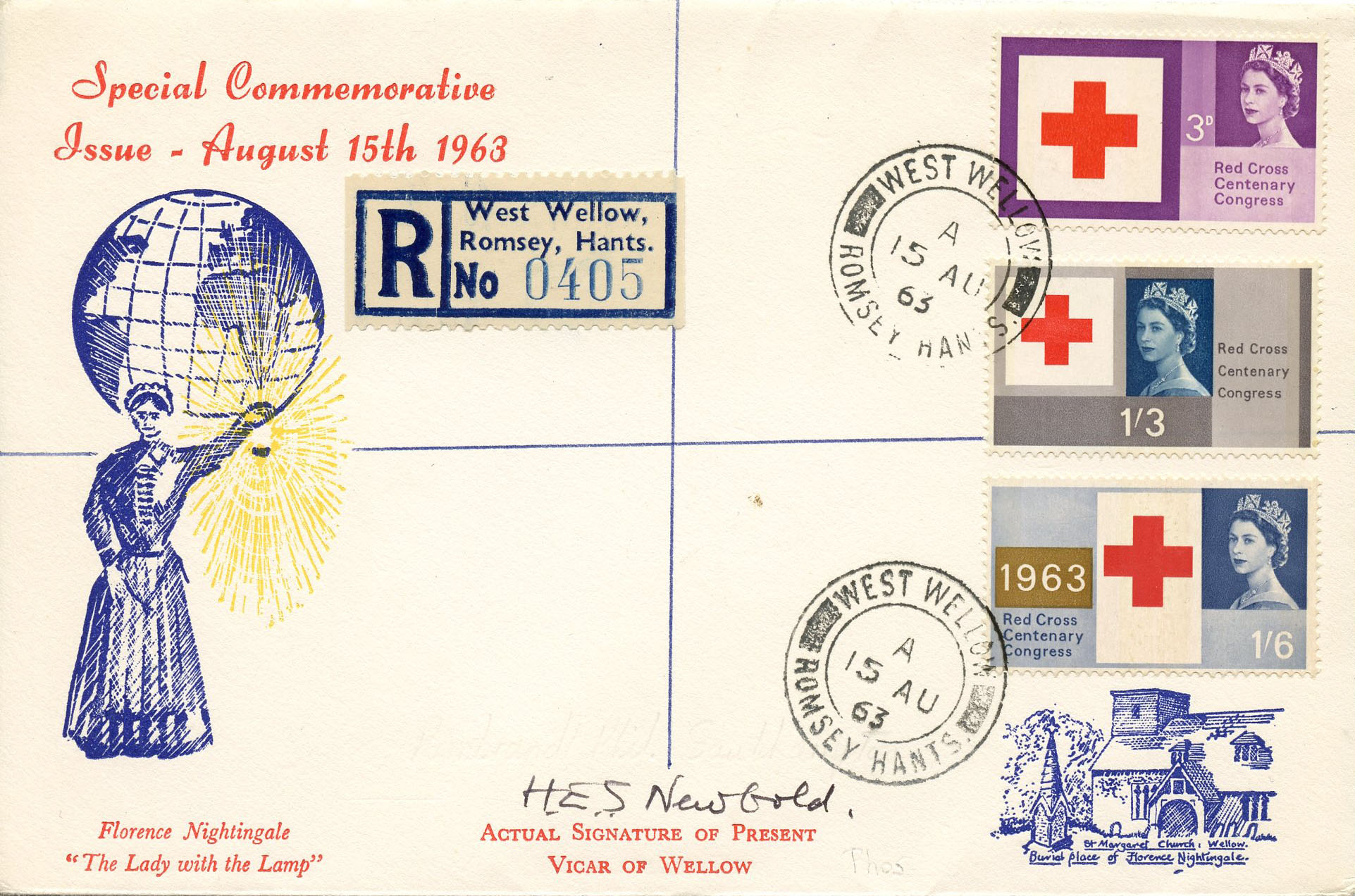
1963 Centenary of the Red Cross cover with West Wellow postmark - where Florence Nightingale was buried

The postmark is one of the most important features of a cover. Stamps are cancelled by a postmark, which shows they have been used and cannot be re-used to send a letter. Circular Date Stamps (CDS) are the 'bread-and-butter' postmarks used on everyday mail by post offices in many countries. A CDS postmark is very straightforward and only features the town’s name and the date. There is no picture. If one wanted to use a CDS postmark from a town relevant to the stamp's issue, one would have to go to the town’s local post office to get it. On a cover, the postmark should touch each stamp and link them to the envelope.

Postmarks came to the foreground in the early 1960s, when collectors started to demand more interesting cancellations on their first day covers. For the U.K.'s Red Cross issue in 1963, a special Florence Nightingale cover was posted at her birthplace, West Wellow. The Botanical Conference issue of 1964 featured primroses on the stamps, so one clever cover dealer posted his covers at Primrose Valley. This kind of relevant postmark made a cover worth often ten times more than the same cover with a standard postmark issued by the Philatelic Bureau at Edinburgh (a place with no connection to the stamps). In the U.S., the United States Postal Service chooses a city, or several, as "official" first day cities. These often have a special connection to the stamp issue being released, and these postmarks are the only ones that have the wording "First Day of Issue."

=== Special handstamps ===
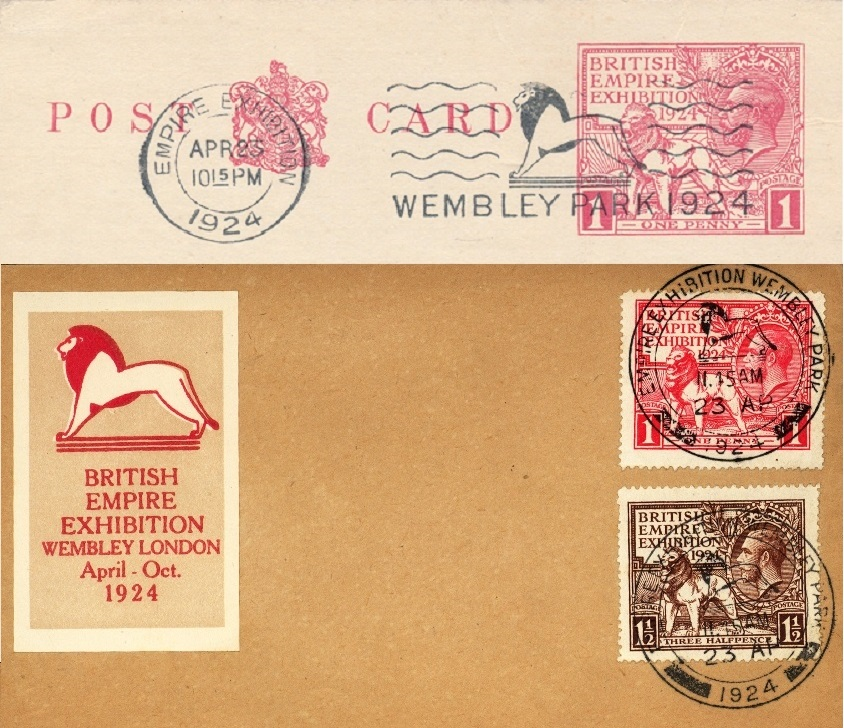
Examples of special slogan and special postmarks for the 1924 British Empire Exhibition

With postmarks becoming more and more important to the covers, pictorial postmarks became very popular. Pictorial postmarks are also known in the U.K. as Special Handstamps/Postmarks. In 1924, the first commemorative set of stamps for the British Empire Exhibition had both special postmarks and a special slogan, but it was not until the late 1960s and early 1970s that dealers and organisations really caught on that you could sponsor/design a connected postmark and it would make an ordinary cover something special. These days anyone can sponsor a postmark. They need to design the postmark, get it approved by Royal Mail and then pay a fee. The postmark then becomes the property of Royal Mail and anyone is allowed to use it on their covers. This means that to a certain extent, most cover producers “borrow” other people’s postmarks. However, to be an “official” cover, a postmark has to be on the cover produced by the organisation that sponsored the postmark in the first place.

=== Cachet ===
As the collecting of first day covers became more popular they began to appear on prepared envelopes, often with an illustration (commonly referred to by collectors as a cachet) that corresponded with the theme of the stamp. Several printing companies began producing such envelopes and often hired freelance illustrators to design their cachets such as Charles R. Chickering who in his earlier years designed postage stamps for the U.S. Post Office. Cachets should not be confused with postmarks, which are typically rubber stamps. Postmarks can only be applied by official Post Offices, whereas anyone can design a cachet using any artistic medium and put it on their cover. A cachet makes a cover unique and helps tell the story of the cover. It can say whether the cover was carried (for example, covers were carried on the very last flight of the Concorde), who the signer was or information about the postmark. Royal Mail no longer counts pre-decimal stamps as valid and will not postmark them, a cachet can therefore be used to cancel a pre-decimal stamp on a cover. It provides a link between that stamp and the envelope. They can also be used to cancel Cinderella stamps.

== See also ==
- Earliest reported postmark on stamped envelopes

== Sources ==
- Hudgeons, Marc; et al. (2009). The Official Blackbook Price Guide to United States Postage Stamps 2010. Random House. p. 656. ISBN 9780375723247.
- Buckingham, Tony (1999). Essential Guide to British First Day Covers. Stanley Gibbons. p. 16. ISBN 0852594879.
