= Cover (philately) =

Outside of a piece of mail

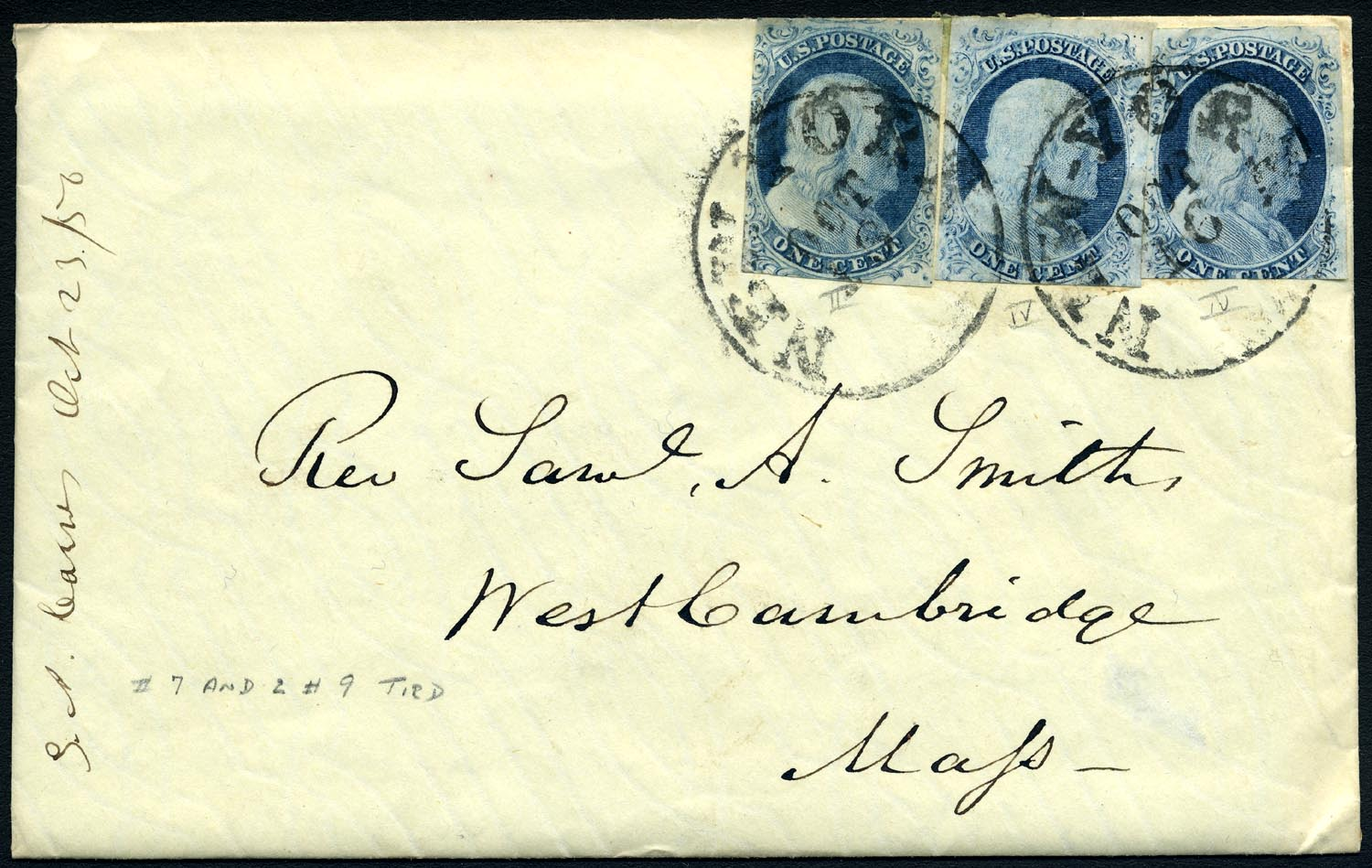
1856 cover posted in New York City with three 1-cent stamps affixed

In philately, the term cover pertains to the outside of an envelope or package with an address, typically with postage stamps that have been cancelled and is a term generally used among stamp and postal history collectors. The term does not include the contents of the letter or package, although they may add interest to the item if still present. Cover collecting plays an important role in postal history as many covers bear stamps, postmarks and other markings along with names and addresses all of which help to place a cover at a given time and place in history.

== History ==
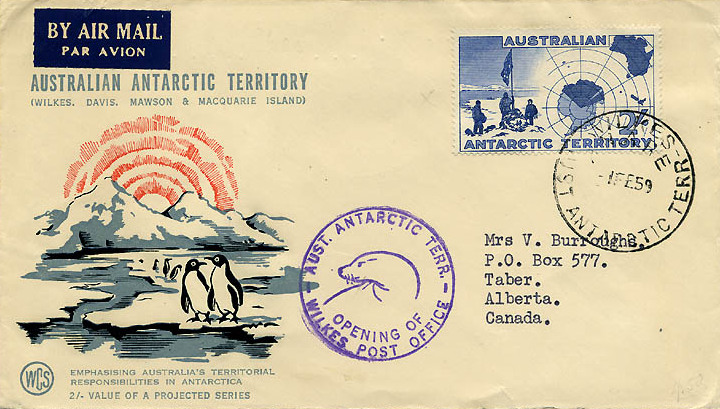
AAT cover commemorating the opening of a post office in 1959

The term originates from the practice of covering a letter by folding a separate sheet about it to physically protect it and prevent infringement of confidentiality. In the first half of the 19th century it became the fashion to cut the cover into a diamond or lozenge shape. This was the precursor of the version of the envelope known today. Its convenience and popularity led to the lozenge design being adopted for the special pre-paid postage envelopes and covers issued in 1840 after postal reforms were introduced by Rowland Hill and others.

A philatelic cover is an envelope or post card prepared with a stamp(s) and address and sent through the mail delivery system for the purpose of creating a collectible item.

== Categories ==
There are several different basic categories for covers. Names for cover types is also terminology usually used by collectors of stamps and postal history. There exist a wide variety of covers that can fit into several basic categories. The categories begin with the most common types of collectible covers, such as first day covers or first flight covers. Sometimes there will be an area of overlap in the subject of categories. For example, there are first day covers that were also sent with mail aboard airplanes on first flight mail runs. Event covers can also include first flights or other types of covers. A military cover sent to a head of state can also be referred to as a historic cover.

- An advertising cover is a postally used envelope with advertisement for the products or services offered by a business or organization. In addition to the name and return address, the advertiser's text or illustration may appear on either the front or the back of the envelope.
- A first day cover is typically an envelope with a postage stamp canceled on its first day of issue. The design or theme of the stamp may be printed on the cover to enhance its appeal to the philatelic community.
- An event cover celebrates an event or notes an anniversary.
- Stamp on cover. This is a cover that is collected as an example of a given stamp postally used on a cover; however, older stamps with recent cancellations are usually philatelic (mailed with the intention of recovering and collecting the item).
- A pre-stamped cover is a cover that already has an imprinted stamp.
- First flight covers are those carried on an aircraft, usually authorized by a government or postal administration, for the first time on a particular route.
- A stampless cover is an envelope or folded outer sheet bearing an address and manuscript or ink-stamped postal markings without prepaid adhesive postage stamps, normally from the period before adhesive postage stamps became available or common in the mid-to-late 19th century.
- Military covers can include a wide variety of subjects that may include first flight covers and prisoner of war covers. Mail sent from an Army Post Office (APO) or a Navy Post Office (Fleet Post Office, FPO) are common types of military covers.
- Railroad covers are mail that was processed aboard special rail cars outfitted with an official post office where mail is processed en route to its general destination.
- Historical covers are those that have special historical significance above and beyond that of the average collectible cover. These can include mail sent by kings, presidents, or other heads of state. If the historical cover is, for example, to or from a general in an army the cover then it can also be classified as a military cover. Names for cover categories are usually used as general reference in philately. If aspects of a cover (date+postmark, name+address) are referenced in a historical capacity the category of the cover may not even be mentioned.
- Cover fronts are covers where only the front side of the cover has been kept. These covers are also collectable, but when selling them or describing them, it must be mentioned they are fronts only.
- Postage meter covers are typically commercial envelopes with postage meter prints. Besides collecting them by country, they can be collected by manufacturer of the metering machine and by topic of the advertisement slogans of the meter clichés.

Other specialty types of covers include censored covers along with blockade mail, Pony Express covers, prisoner of war covers, and patriotic covers, among others.

== Availability ==
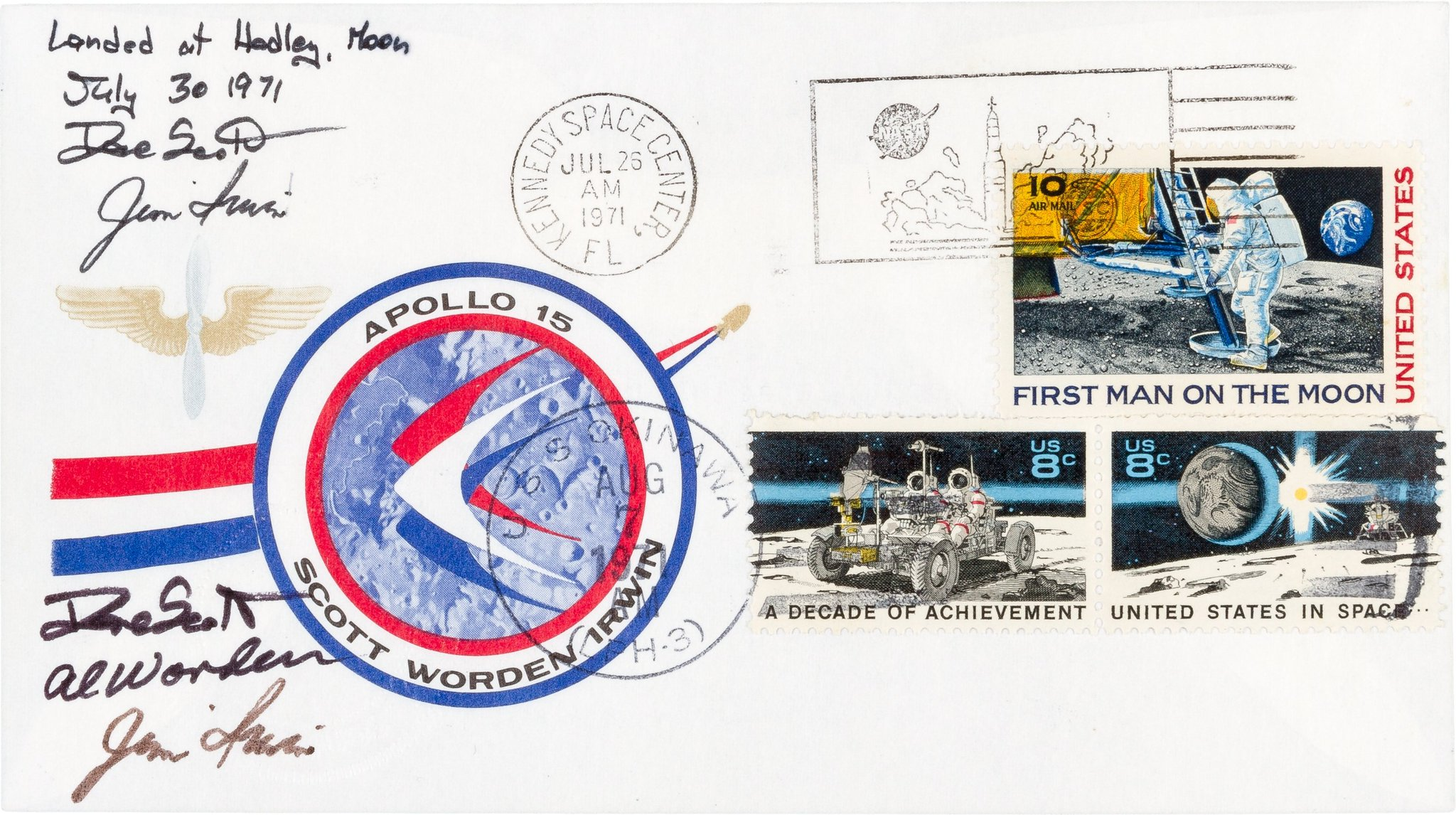
A "Sieger cover", one of the hundreds of covers which traveled to the Moon during the 1971 Apollo 15 postal covers incident

The availability of the different types of covers varies considerably and is something that often adds perspective to the historical and philatelic significance of the cover. For example, First day covers and first flight covers are generally common because the events that inspired the creation of these covers were somewhat common and are typically scheduled in advance, thus allowing collectors to plan to have such covers created. In other examples, various types of military and historical covers are often scarce or rare because the circumstances or events that prompted the creation of these covers were conversely uncommon. While covers sent in recent decades tend to be common, they can also prove to be scarce simply because the circumstance that created these covers were (sometimes very) uncommon, as are the various examples of historical covers i.e. sent by a head of state to another officially prominent individual. At the same time there exist covers that are quite old but are still common and not very difficult to find, as are various types of post cards or commercial covers. Patriotic covers are generally common because the practice of sending these was popular, especially during periods of war. Patriotic cover availability here can vary also depending on the country and time period in question. Covers collected for the stamp on cover can vary greatly in availability and generally depends on the availability of the stamp issue itself along with the demand for the use of a particular denomination. The denomination of a stamp often determines the availability of the issue on cover as the use of some, usually higher, denominations was uncommon because of the low demand for a particular postage rate. There are a number of circumstances that can affect the availability of a given cover type and which often contribute to a cover's historical and philatelic value.

== See also ==
- Airmail
- Apollo insurance covers
- Apollo 15 postal covers incident
- Civil War covers
- Crash cover
- Disinfected mail
- Philatelic cover
- Prisoner of war mail
- Stampless mail
