= Clip =

Clip or CLIP may refer to:

== Fasteners ==
- Clip (firearms), a device for storing multiple rounds together as a unit before inserting into a magazine or cylinder
- Binder clip, a device for holding thicker materials (such as large volumes of paper) together
  - Bulldog clip, a common binder clip
- Bread clip, a device for closing bags
- Climbing clip, a device used to quickly and reversibly connect elements of climbing equipment
- Circlip, a semi-flexible metal ring fastener for holding a pin in place
- Crocodile clip, or alligator clip, a temporary electrical connector
- Hair clip, a device for holding hair together or attaching materials such as caps to the hair
- Money clip, a device for storing cash and credit cards in a very compact fashion
- Paper clip, a device for holding several sheets of paper together
- Rail clip, a rail fastener
- Roach clip, a holder for smoking a cannabis cigarette

== Arts and entertainment ==
- Clip art, pre-made images used in graphic arts
- Media clip, a short segment of electronic media, either an audio clip or a video clip
  - Video clip (disambiguation)
- Clip (film), a 2012 film
- Clips (game show), a game show that aired on YTV from 1993 to 1996

== Science and technology ==
=== Biology and medicine ===
- Class II-associated invariant chain peptide, a protein involved in MHC class II assembly and transport to the cell membrane
- Corticotropin-like intermediate peptide, an endogenous neuropeptide
- Cross-linking immunoprecipitation, a method used in molecular biology to locate RNA modifications among others
- Cancer Likelihood in Plasma, a set of ensemble learning methods

=== Computing and telecommunications ===
- Contrastive Language–Image Pre-training, for training neural network models
- CLIPS, a software tool for building expert systems, including the programming language COOL
- Calling line identification presentation, a Caller ID technology
- Clips (software), video editing software application by Apple

=== Other uses in science and technology ===
- Caribbean large igneous province, in geology, a major flood basalt
- Continuous Liquid Interface Production, a form of additive manufacturing that uses photo polymerization

== Other uses ==
- Confirmed line item performance, a measure of the reliability of supply chain delivery
- Cupertino Language Immersion Program, a K-8 program in the Cupertino Union School District, California, US
- Los Angeles Clippers, a US basketball team, nicknamed Clips

== See also ==
- Clipped (disambiguation)
- Clipper (disambiguation)
- Clipping (disambiguation)
- Clippy
- Clipse
- Klip (disambiguation)
- Klippe
