= Clipped =

Clipped may refer to:

- Clipped (miniseries), a 2024 American miniseries
- Clipped (TV series), a 2015 American sitcom
- Clipped (video), a 1991 video by AC/DC
- Content that has been made into a video clip

== See also ==
- Clip
- Clipper (disambiguation)
- Clipping (disambiguation)
