= Clipper (disambiguation) =

A clipper is a type of fast sailing vessel, generally from the 19th century.

Clipper or clippers may also refer to:

== Business ==
- Clipper Logistics, a British logistics company
- Clipper Teas, branded as "Clipper", a British fairtrade tea company
- Clipper Windpower, a wind turbine manufacturer
- Clipper (lighter), a brand of cigarette lighter

== Computing and electronics ==
- Clipper (programming language), a programming language for dBase III
- Clipper (electronics), a device that restricts the output of an alternating current circuit
- Clipper (video game), a 1982 video game written by John S. Bayes
- Clipper chip, a symmetric encryption integrated circuit developed by the NSA, defunct by 1996, that had a built-in backdoor
- Clipper architecture, 32-bit RISC-like computing architecture
- Clipper, a person who makes clipped content

== Places in the United States ==
- Clipper, Arkansas, an unincorporated community in Miller County, Arkansas
- Clipper, Washington, an unincorporated community
- Clipper Mountains, Mojave Desert, California
- Clipper Valley, Mojave Desert, California

== Sports ==
- Los Angeles Clippers, a National Basketball Association (NBA) team
- San Diego Clippers (NBA G League), an NBA G League team
- Columbus Clippers, a minor league baseball franchise
- Baltimore Clippers, a minor league ice hockey team
- Nanaimo Clippers, a junior ice hockey team

== Transportation ==
=== Air ===
- Boeing 314 Clipper, a Pan Am and BOAC (British Airways) flying boat
- Boeing C-40 Clipper, a military version of the Boeing 737-700C airline transport
- Cessna 303 Clipper, the original model of the Cessna T303 Crusader light aircraft
- Pan Am Clipper, a callsign for Pan American World Airways
- Piper PA-16 Clipper, a small aircraft
- Raj Hamsa Clipper, an Indian ultralight trike design
- Spartan Clipper, a British 1930s light touring aeroplane
- Worldwide Ultralite Clipper, ultralight aircraft

=== Land ===
- Clipper (steam automobile), built in Michigan in 1902
- Allard Clipper, a microcar produced in London in 1953 and 1954
- Nissan Clipper, two ranges of commercial vehicle
- Packard Clipper, a 1940s/50s American automobile, and a stand-alone marque
- Trident Clipper, a British sports car (1966-1974)

=== Water ===
- SS Milwaukee Clipper, a retired steel-hulled auto and train ferry also known as SS Clipper
- Clipper Group, an international shipping company founded in 1991
- Clipper Navigation, a private company which operates ferries etc. in the Seattle–Vancouver area
- Clipper, a type of cruising yacht, a masthead cutter, used in the Clipper Round the World Yacht Race

=== Space ===
- Delta Clipper, a reusable space vehicle
- Europa Clipper, a NASA mission to conduct detailed reconnaissance of Jupiter's moon Europa
- Kliper or Clipper, a space vehicle developed by the Russian Roskosmos in cooperation with the ESA

== Other uses ==
- Clipper (nickname), a list of people
- Alberta clipper, a fast-moving weather system
- The Clipper, a newspaper published in Hobart, Tasmania, from 1893 to 1909
- New York Clipper, a newspaper from 1853 to 1924
- Hair clipper, used to cut hair
- Hedge clipper, a gardening tool
- Nail clipper, used to cut fingernails
- Operation Clipper, a World War II offensive in western Germany
- Clipper barb, an African freshwater fish
- Clipper butterflies, the genus Parthenos and in particular the species Parthenos sylvia
- Clipper card, a smart card for paying transit fares in the San Francisco Bay Area

== See also ==
- Yankee Clipper (disambiguation)
