= China Clipper (disambiguation) =

China Clipper was the first of three Martin M-130 four-engine flying boats.

China Clipper may also refer to:

== Transport and vehicular ==
- China clipper (ship), a class of clipper ships
- Pan Am China Clipper air route, a flying boat airline route between San Francisco Bay and Asia flown by Pan Am
  - Pan Am Alameda marine air terminal, nicknamed the China Clipper terminal; now part of the Naval Air Station Alameda, Alameda, San Francisco Bay, California, USA
  - Pan Am Manila marine air terminal, nicknamed the China Clipper terminal; now part of the Manila Yacht Club, Manila, Manila Bay, Luzon, Philippines

== People ==
- Larry Kwong (nicknamed the "China Clipper", 1923–2018), first Chinese Canadian to play in the National Hockey League
- Norman Kwong (nicknamed the "China Clipper", 1929–2016), first Chinese Canadian to play in the Canadian Football League

== Other uses ==
- China Clipper (film), 1936, starring Pat O'Brien
- "China Clipper", a song from the 1982 musical Poppy
- The China Clipper, a bimonthly stamp magazine published by the China Stamp Society

== See also ==
- All pages with titles containing "China" and "Clipper"
- China (disambiguation)
- Clipper (disambiguation)
