= Clipping =

Clipping may refer to:

== Words ==
- Clipping (morphology), the formation of a new word by shortening it, e.g. "ad" from "advertisement"
- Clipping (phonetics), shortening the articulation of a speech sound, usually a vowel
- Clipping (publications), cutting out articles from a paper publication

== Science and technology ==
- Coin clipping, shaving off a small portion of precious metal for profit
- Clipping (computer graphics), only drawing things that will be visible to the viewer
- Noclip mode, or "Noclipping", when the player or another object in a video game unrealistically passes through another object
- Clipping (gardening), pruning, removing unwanted portions from a plant
  - Clippings, the portions that are removed in this process
- Clipping (media), creating short-form content from long-form content
- Clipping (medicine), surgical treatment used to treat an aneurysm
- Clipping (signal processing), a form of distortion that limits a signal once it exceeds a threshold. Some forms include:
  - Clipping (audio), the clipping of the top and bottom of a sound wave, referred to as "distortion" or "overdrive"
  - Clipping (photography), the clipping of overexposed area by digital cameras and film
  - Soft clipping

== Animals ==
- Horse clipping, trimming all or part of a horse's fur
- Sheep shearing
- Wing clipping, trimming a bird's primary flight feathers to disable flight

== Sports ==
- Clipping (climbing), the process of protecting against a fall
- Clipping (gridiron football), a penalty in gridiron football
- Clipping (ice hockey), hitting an opposing player below the knees

== Other uses ==
- Clipping the church, an ancient custom
- Clipping (band), an experimental hip-hop group
  - CLPPNG, their debut album

== See also ==
- Clip (disambiguation)
