= Johan Vaaler =

Norwegian inventor (1866–1910)

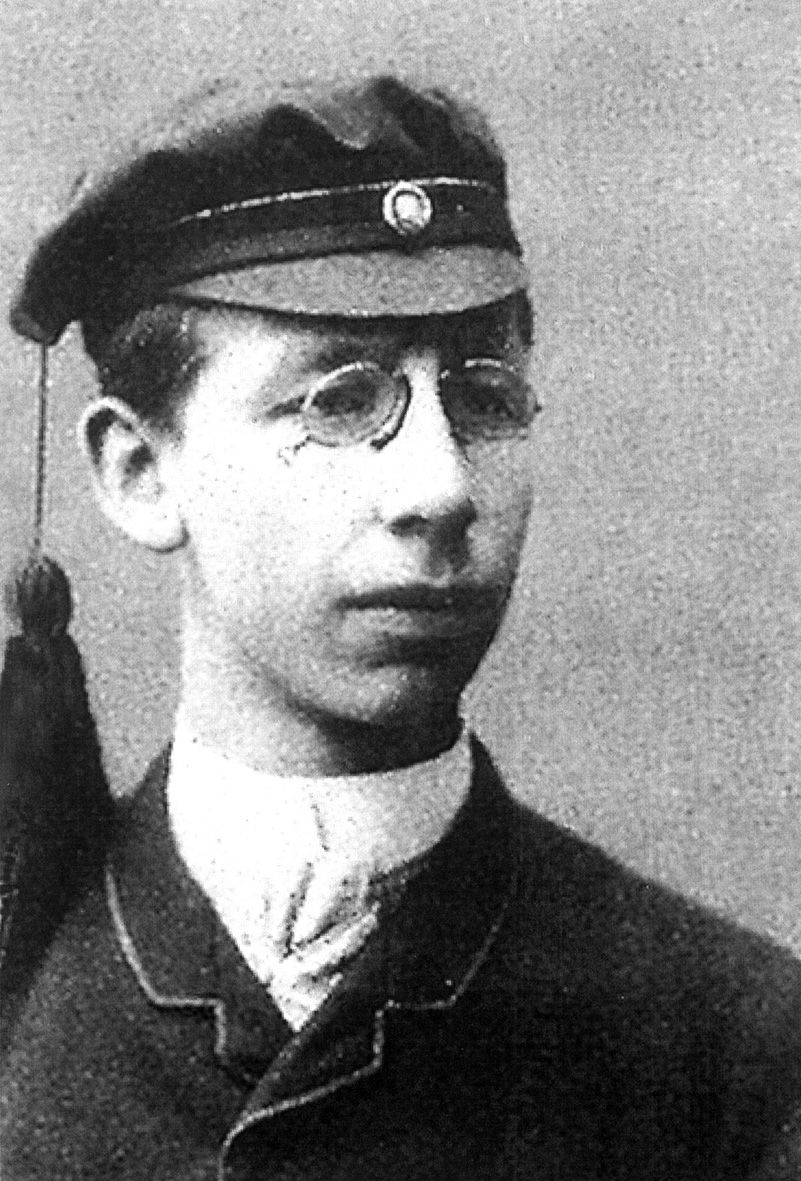
- Johan Vaaler, c. 1887
- Born: 15 March 1866
- Died: 14 March 1910 (aged 43)
- Occupation: Inventor

The paper clip patented by Vaaler in 1899 and 1901

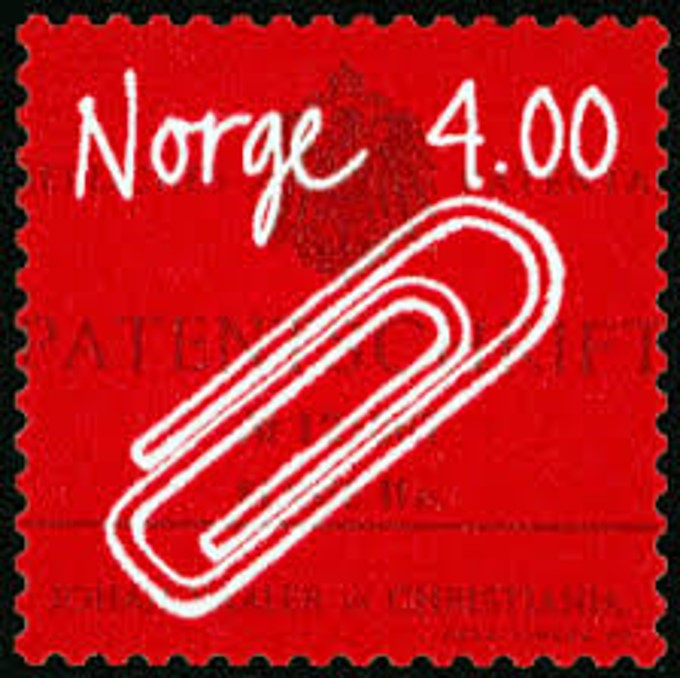
Postage stamp issued in 1999 to commemorate Vaaler's alleged invention of the paper clip. The clip depicted is the common Gem clip, not the one patented by Vaaler.

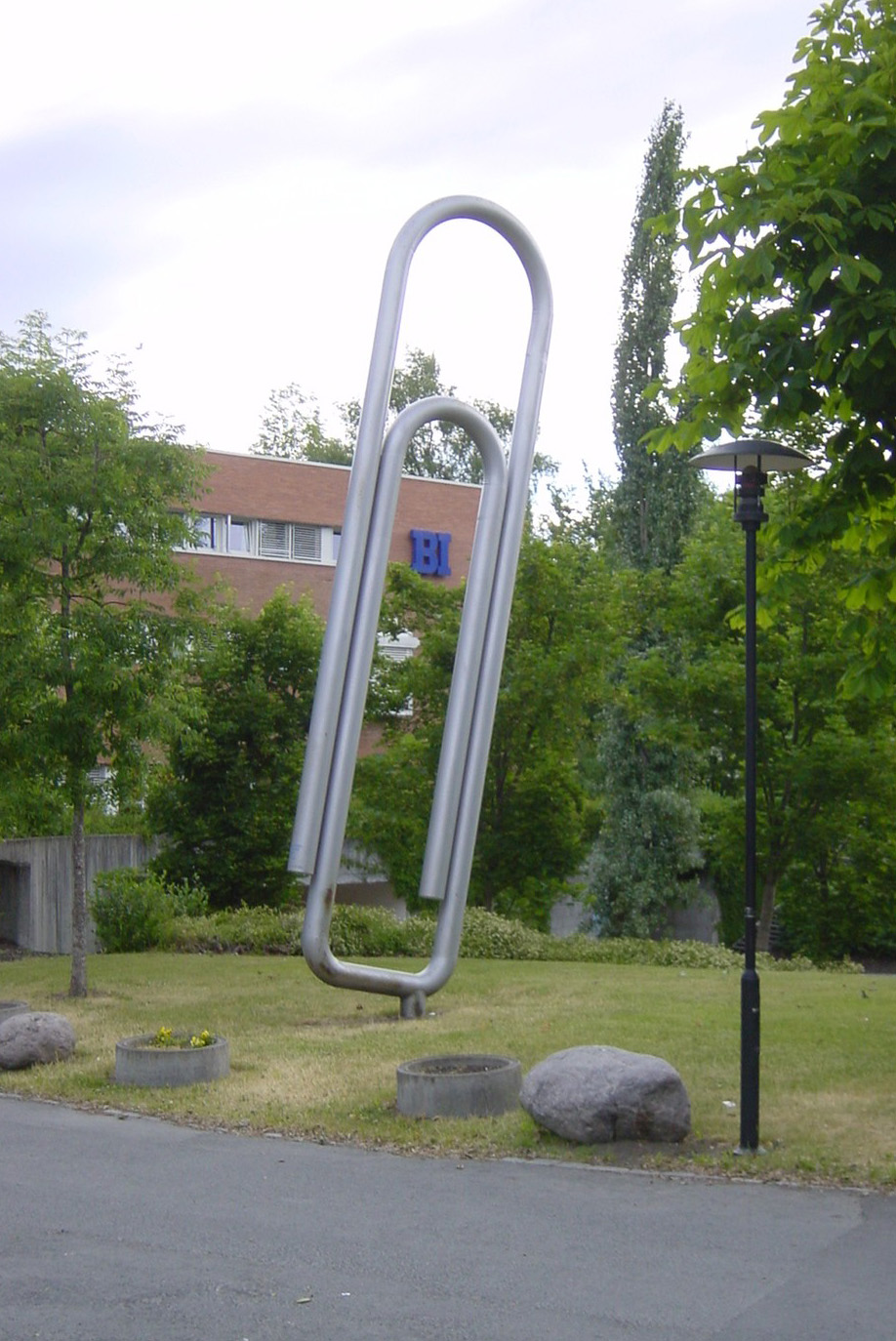
Giant paper clip erected in 1989 in Sandvika, Norway, to honor Vaaler's invention. This 23-foot-tall (7 m) clip is the Gem, not the one patented by Vaaler.

Johan Vaaler (March 15, 1866 – March 14, 1910) was a Norwegian inventor and patent clerk. He has often erroneously been identified as the inventor of the common paper clip.

== Biography ==
John was at Aurskog-Høland in Akershus, Norway. Vaaler worked from 1892 until his death in 1910 as a patent examiner and manager at the patent office of Alfred Jørgen Bryn (Alfred J. Bryns Patentkontor) in Kristiania (now Oslo).

Around 1899, Vaaler designed a kind of binding to hold paper together, consisting of a thread of steel wire. He applied for a German patent on November 12, 1900 and it was granted on June 6, 1901. He also filed an application for a United States patent on January 9, 1901. The U.S. patent was granted on June 4, 1901.

Unknown to Vaaler, a more functional and practical paper clip was already in production by the British Gem Manufacturing Company Ltd, but not yet marketed in Norway. His design was inferior because it lacked the two full loops of the wire. Vaaler probably succeeded in having his design patented abroad, despite the existence of a better product, because patent authorities at that time were quite liberal and rewarded any marginal modification of earlier inventions.

Several types of paper clips had been patented in the United States since 1867, but the "Gem" type was not then (and has never been) patented. As an employee of Bryns patent office in Kristiania, Vaaler was familiar with patent legislation and procedures in Norway. His reasons for applying abroad are unknown, but it is possible that he had an exaggerated confidence in his invention and saw the need to secure the commercial rights internationally. Also, he may have been aware that Norwegian inventors would meet difficulties on the small home market. Quite soon he must have had the disappointment of his life when he was confronted by the "Gem", which was probably introduced in Norway during his own lifetime. He is not known to have tried to contact potential manufacturers in Norway or abroad, and this lack of initiative seems to confirm that he soon learned that a superior clip already existed. His patent was allowed to expire quietly. Meanwhile, the "Gem" conquered the world, including his own country. The Norwegian fish hook manufacturer O. Mustad & Son AS of Gjøvik has produced "Gem"-type paper clips since 1928.

Vaaler's alleged invention of the paper clip became known in Norway after World War II and found its way into some encyclopedias. Events of that war contributed greatly to the mythical status of the paper clip as a national symbol. During the German occupation of Norway during World War II, after pins or badges bearing national symbols or the initials of exiled King Haakon VII were banned, Norwegians began to wear paper clips in their lapels as a symbol of resistance to the occupiers and local Nazi authorities. The clips were meant to denote solidarity and unity ("we are bound together"). Their symbolism was even more obvious because paper clips are called "binders" in Norwegian. Their presumed Norwegian origin was not generally known at that time, but when that widely believed story was added to the war-time experience of many patriots, it strengthened their status as national symbols. Proofs of the national pride in Vaaler's alleged invention are the postage stamp issued in 1999 and the giant paper clip erected in front of the BI commercial college in 1989.

== Literature ==
- Petroski, Henry (1992) The Evolution of Useful Things ISBN 0-679-74039-2 (Vintage Books, Knopf Doubleday Publishing Group)
