= Paper clip =

Metal device to hold papers together

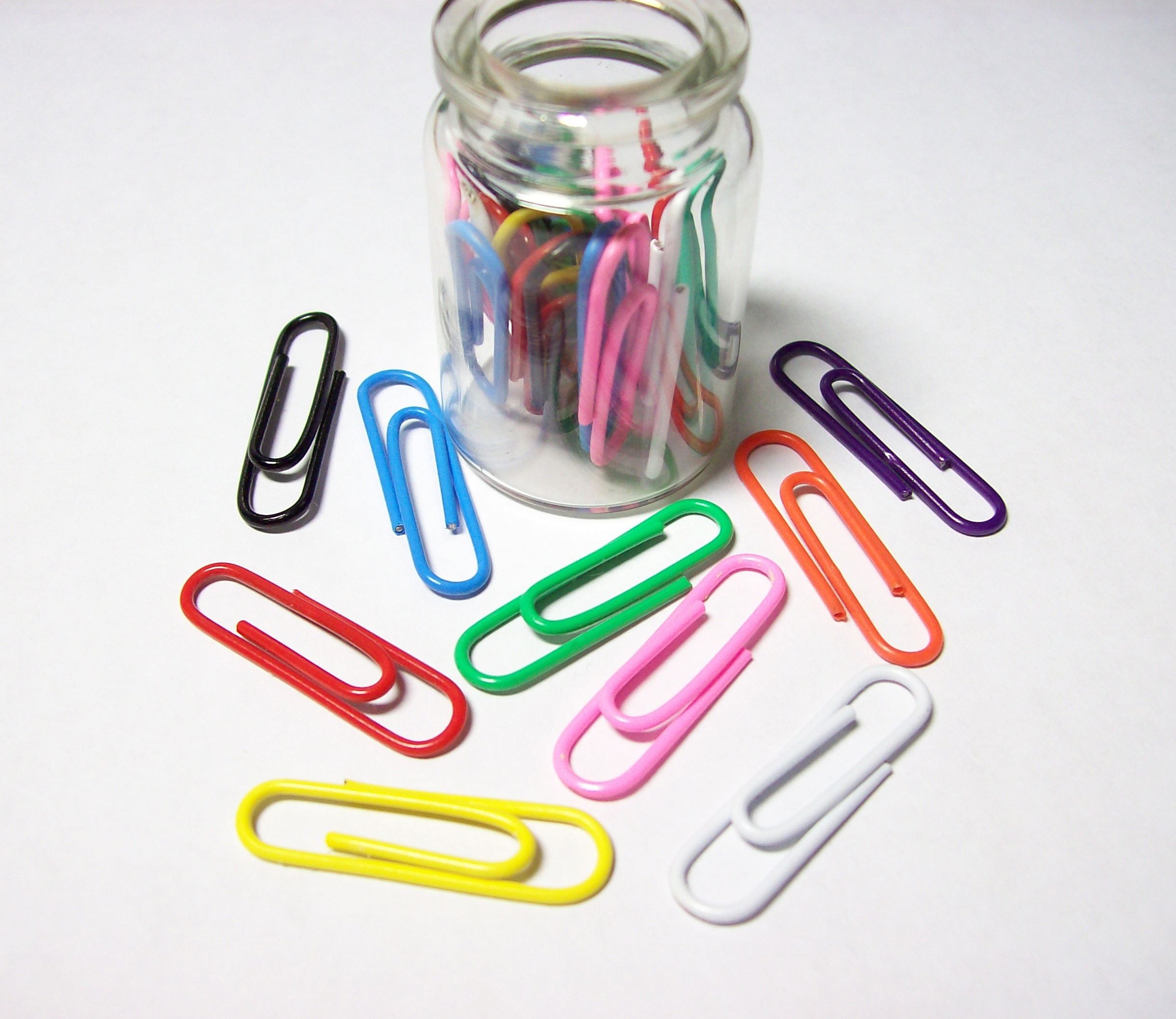
Paper clips colors coated in a mix of plastic and rubber

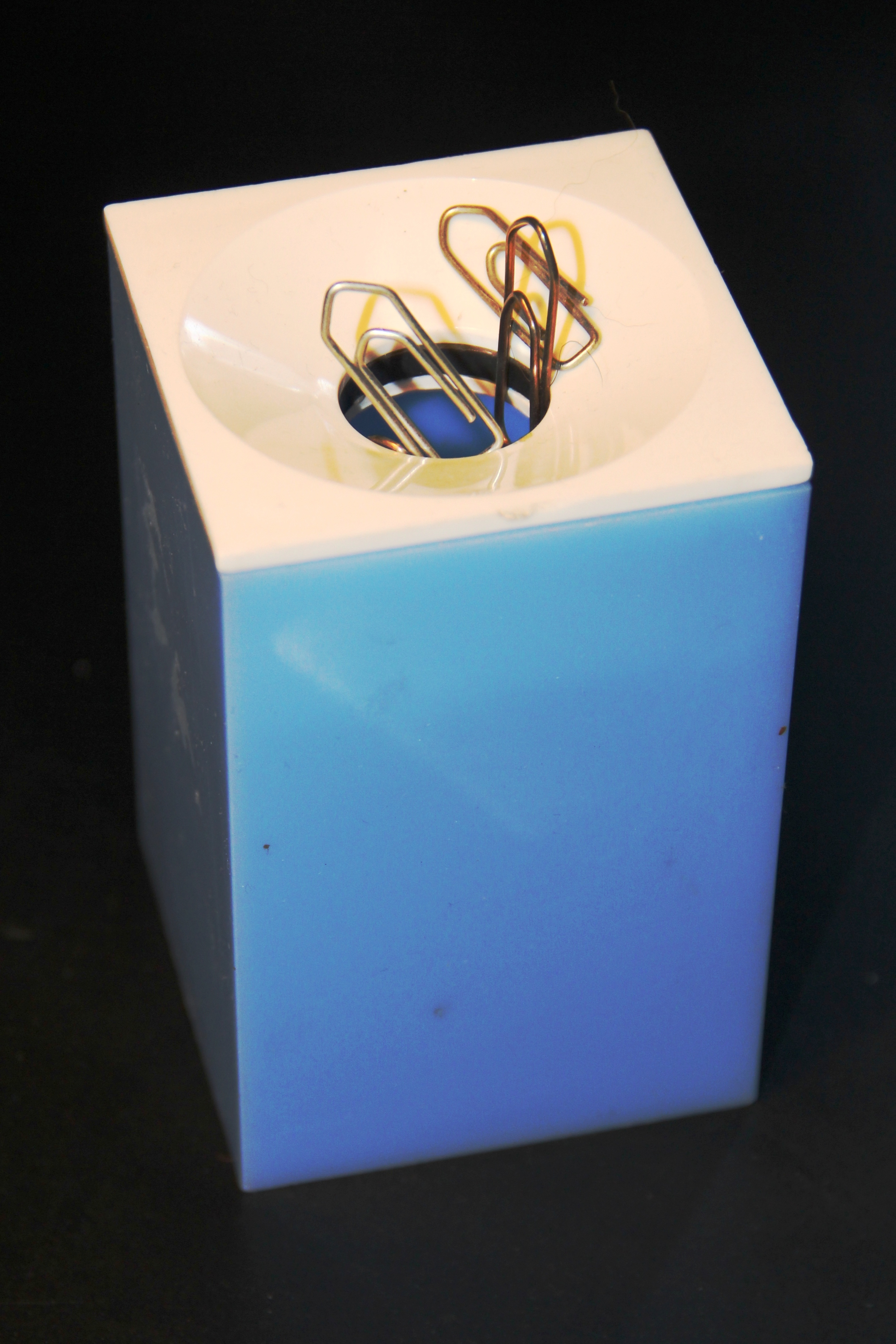
A paper clip holder

A paper clip (or paperclip) is a tool used to hold sheets of paper together, usually made of steel wire bent to a looped shape (though some are covered in plastic). Most paper clips are variations of the Gem type introduced in the 1890s or earlier, characterized by the one and a half loops made by the wire. Common to paper clips proper is their utilization of torsion and elasticity in the wire, and friction between wire and paper. When a moderate number of sheets are inserted between the two "tongues" of the clip, the tongues will be forced apart and cause torsion in the bend of the wire to grip the sheets together. They are usually used to bind papers together for productivity and portability.

== Shape and composition ==
Paper clips usually have an oblong shape with straight sides, but may also be triangular or circular, or have more elaborate shapes. The most common material is steel or some other metal, but molded plastic is also used. Some kinds of paper clips use a two-piece clamping system. Recent innovations include multi-colored plastic-coated paper clips and spring-fastened binder clips. Regular metal paper clips weigh about a gram.

== History ==
According to the Early Office Museum, the first patent for a bent wire paper clip was awarded in the United States to Samuel B. Fay in 1867. This clip was originally intended primarily for attaching tickets to fabric, although the patent recognized that it could be used to attach papers together. Fay received U.S. patent 64,088 on 23 April 1867. Although functional and practical, Fay's design along with the 50 other designs patented prior to 1899 are not considered reminiscent of the modern paperclip design known today. Another notable paper clip design was also patented in the United States by Erlman J. Wright on 24 July 1877, patent #193,389. This clip was advertised at that time for use in fastening together loose leaves of papers, documents, periodicals, newspapers etc.

The most common type of wire paper clip still in use, the Gem paper clip, was never patented, but it was most likely in production in Britain in the early 1870s by "The Gem Manufacturing Company", according to the American expert on technological innovations, Professor Henry J. Petroski. He refers to an 1883 article about "Gem Paper-Fasteners", praising them for being "better than ordinary pins" for "binding together papers on the same subject, a bundle of letters, or pages of a manuscript". Since the 1883 article had no illustration of this early "Gem", it may have been different from modern paper clips of that name.

The earliest illustration of its current form is in an 1893 advertisement for the "Gem Paper Clip". In 1904 Cushman & Denison registered a trademark for the "Gem" name in connection with paper clips. The announcement stated that it had been used since 1 March 1892, which may have been the time of its introduction in the United States. Paper clips are still sometimes called "Gem clips", and in Swedish the word for any paper clip is "gem" (but pronounced similar to English game).

Definite proof that the modern type of paper clip was well known in 1899 at the latest, is the patent granted to William Middlebrook of Waterbury, Connecticut on 27 April of that year for a "Machine for making wire paper clips". The drawing clearly shows that the product is a perfect clip of the Gem type. The fact that Middlebrook did not mention it by name suggests that it was already well known at the time. Since then countless variations on the same theme have been patented. Some have pointed instead of rounded ends, some have the end of one loop bent slightly to make it easier to insert sheets of paper, and some have wires with undulations or barbs to get a better grip. In addition, purely aesthetic variants have been patented, clips with triangular, star, or round shapes. But the original Gem type has for more than a hundred years proved to be the most practical, and consequently by far the most popular. Its qualities – ease of use, gripping without tearing, and storing without tangling – have been difficult to improve upon. In the United States, National Paperclip Day is celebrated on 29 May.

The Gem-type paperclip has become a symbol of inventive design, as confirmed below – although falsely – by its celebration as a Norwegian invention in 1899. More convincing is its appropriation as logo of the Year of Design (L'any del disseny) in Barcelona 2003, depicted on posters, T-shirts and other merchandise.

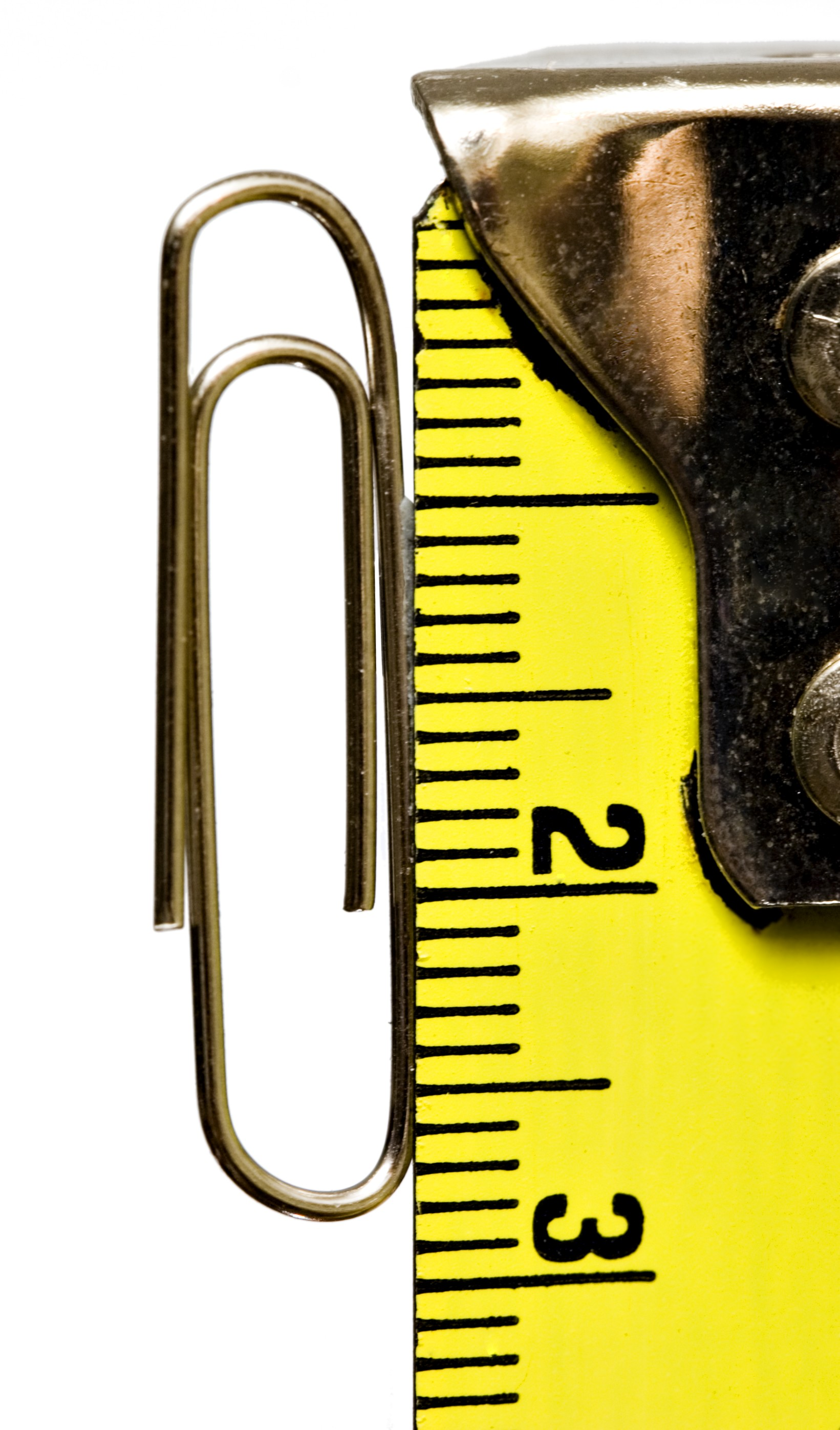
Small metal paper clip, with measure in centimeters

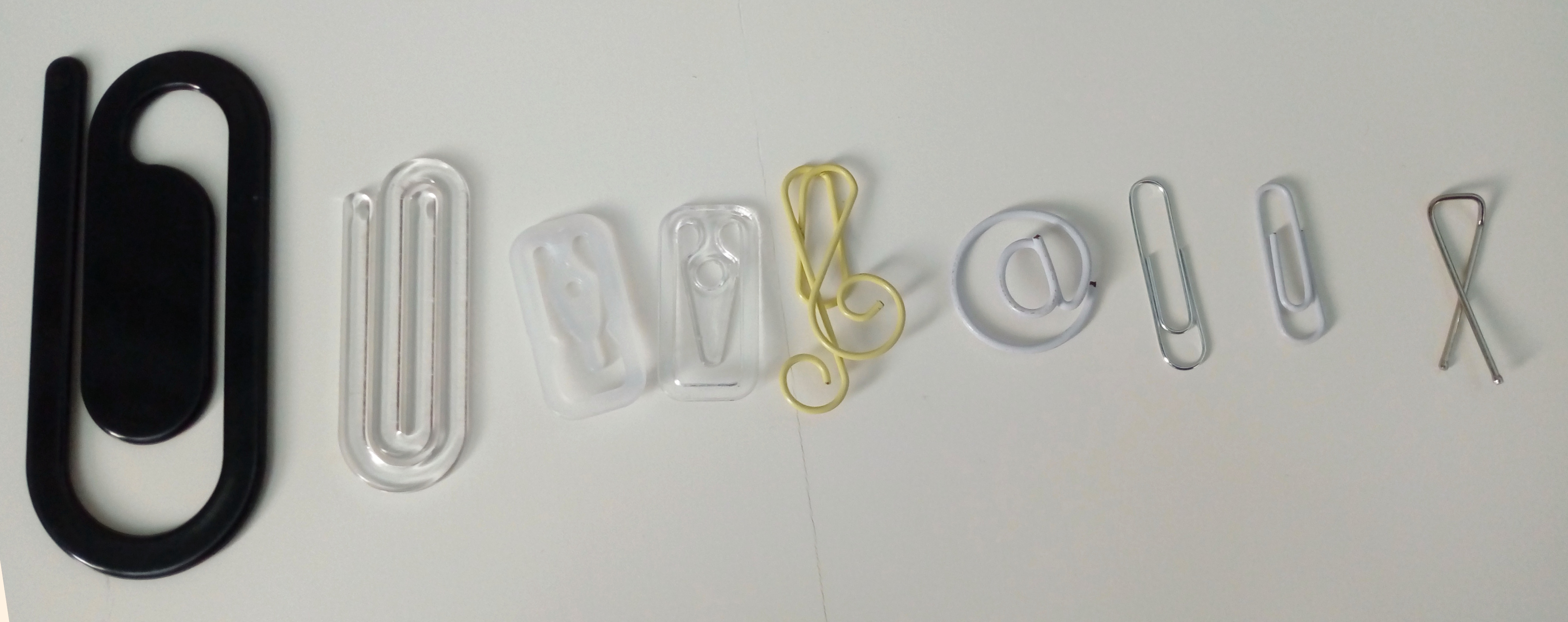
Assorted paperclip shapes, sizes, and designs

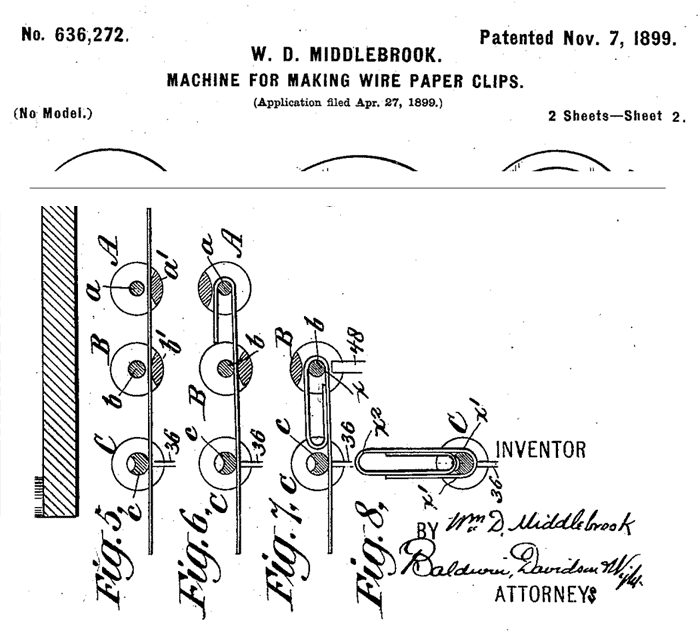
Middlebrook 1899 patent for a paper clip machine showing that the Gem was already in common use (top and bottom)

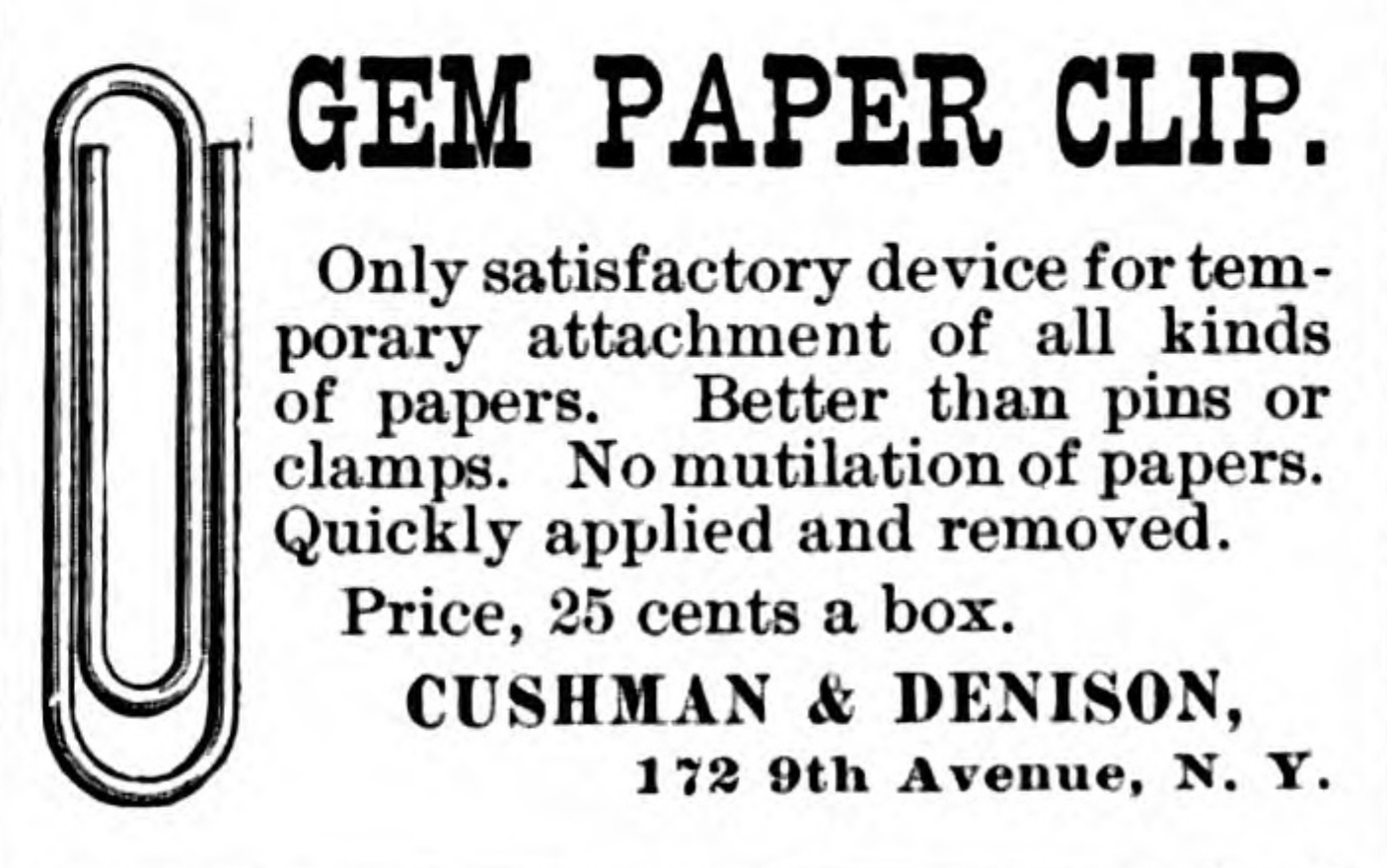
GEM Paper Clip advertisement, Jan 1893, by Cushman & Denison

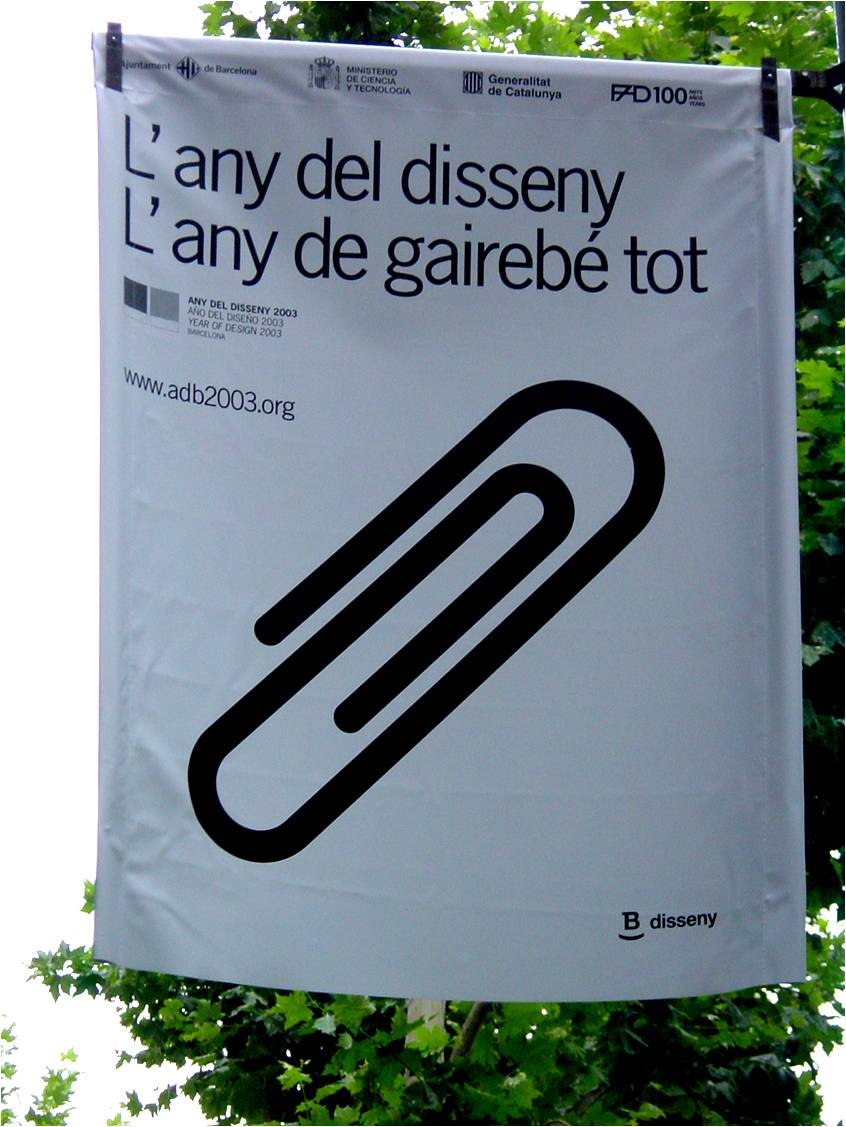
Paper clip icon on poster advertising the Year of Design in Barcelona 2003

=== Unsupported claims ===
It has been claimed that the paper clip was invented by Herbert Spencer (1820–1903), an English intellectual. He registered a "binding-pin" on 2 September 1846, which was made and sold by Adolphus Ackermann for over a year, advertised as "for holding loose manuscripts, sermons, weekly papers, and all unstitched publications". Spencer's design, approximately 15 cm (5.9 in) unfolded, looked more like a modern cotter pin than a modern paper clip.

==== Norwegian claim ====
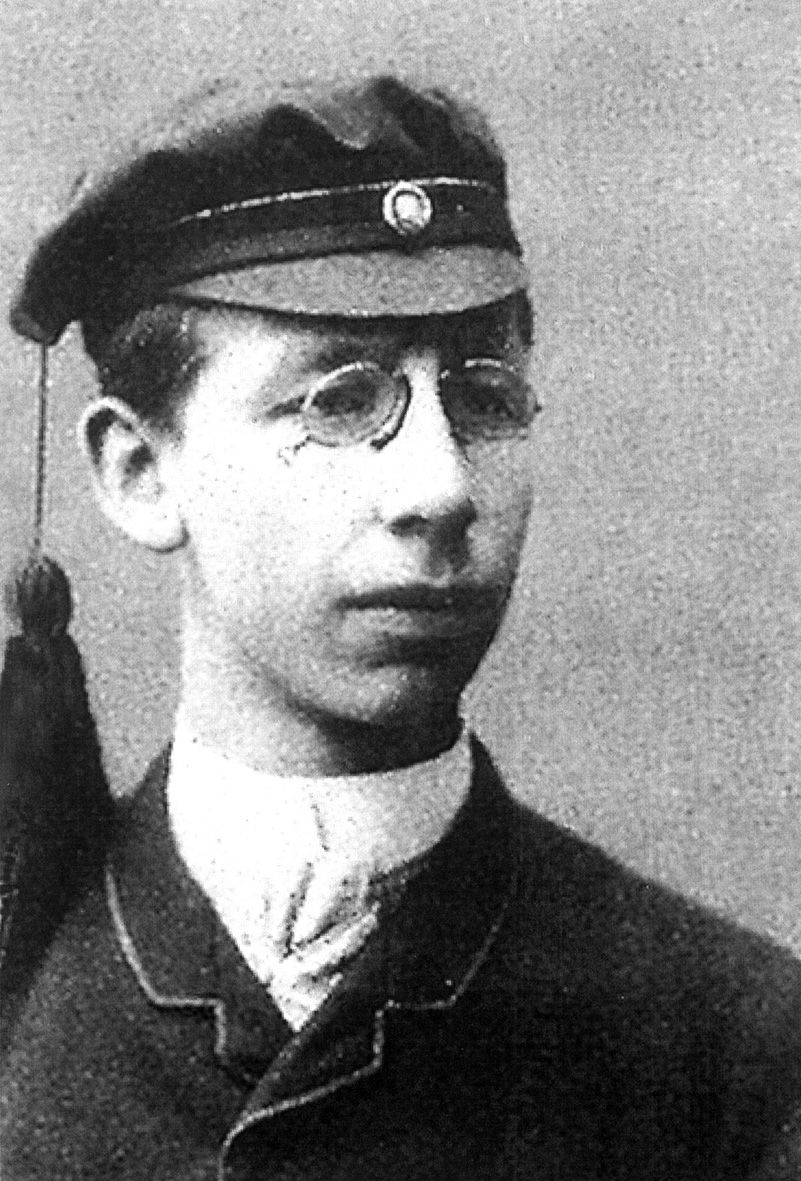
Johan Vaaler in 1887 as a student of the Christiania University

The paper clip patented by Johan Vaaler in 1899 and 1901

Norwegian Johan Vaaler (1866–1910) has been identified as the inventor of the paper clip. He was granted patents in Germany and in the United States (1901) for a paper clip of similar design, but less functional and practical. Because it was more complicated to insert into the paper, Vaaler probably did not know that a better product was already on the market, although not yet in Norway. His version was never manufactured and never marketed because the superior Gem was already available.

Long after Vaaler's death, his countrymen created a national myth based on the false assumption that the paper clip was invented by an unrecognized Norwegian genius. Norwegian dictionaries since the 1950s have mentioned Vaaler as the inventor of the paper clip, and that myth later found its way into international dictionaries and much of the international literature on paper clips.

Vaaler probably succeeded in having his design patented abroad, despite the previous existence of more useful paper clips, because patent authorities at that time were quite liberal and rewarded any marginal modification of existing inventions. Johan Vaaler began working for Alfred J. Bryns Patentkontor in Kristiania in 1892 and was later promoted to office manager, a position he held until his death. As the employee of a patent office, he could easily have obtained a patent in Norway. His reasons for applying abroad are not known; it is possible that he wanted to secure the commercial rights internationally. Also, he may have been aware that a Norwegian manufacturer would find it difficult to introduce a new invention abroad, starting from the small home market.

Vaaler's patents expired quietly, while the "Gem" was used worldwide, including his own country. The failure of his design was its impracticality. Without the two full loops of the fully developed paper clip, it was difficult to insert sheets of paper into his clip. One could manipulate the end of the inner wire so that it could receive the sheet, but the outer wire was a dead end because it could not exploit the torsion principle. The clip would instead stand out like a keel, perpendicular to the sheet of paper. The impracticality of Vaaler's design may easily be demonstrated by cutting off the last outer loop and one long side from a regular Gem clip.

==== National symbol ====
The originator of the Norwegian paper clip myth was an engineer of the Norwegian national patent agency who visited Germany in the 1920s to register Norwegian patents in that country. He came across Vaaler's patent but failed to detect that it was not the same as the then-common Gem-type clip. In the report of the first fifty years of the patent agency, he wrote an article in which he proclaimed Vaaler to be the inventor of the common paper clip. This piece of information found its way into some Norwegian encyclopedias after World War II.

Events of that war contributed greatly to the mythical status of the paper clip. Patriots wore them in their lapels as a symbol of resistance to the German occupiers and local Nazi authorities when other signs of resistance, such as flag pins or pins showing the cipher of the exiled King Haakon VII of Norway, were forbidden. Those wearing them did not yet see them as national symbols, as the myth of their Norwegian origin was not commonly known at the time. The clips were meant to denote solidarity and unity ("we are bound together"). The wearing of paper clips was soon prohibited, and people wearing them could risk severe punishment.

The leading Norwegian encyclopedia mentioned the role of the paper clip as a symbol of resistance in a supplementary volume in 1952 but did not yet proclaim it a Norwegian invention. That information was added in later editions. According to the 1974 edition, the idea of using the paper clip to denote resistance originated in France. A clip worn on a lapel or front pocket could be seen as "deux gaules" (two posts or poles) and be interpreted as a reference to the leader of the French Resistance, General Charles de Gaulle.

The post-war years saw a widespread consolidation of the paper clip as a national symbol. Authors of books and articles on the history of Norwegian technology eagerly seized it to make a thin story more substantial. They chose to overlook the fact that Vaaler's clip was not the same as the fully developed Gem-type clip. In 1989, a giant paper clip, almost 7 m (23 ft) high, was erected on the campus of a commercial college near Oslo in honor of Vaaler, ninety years after his invention was patented. But this monument shows a Gem-type clip, not the one patented by Vaaler. The celebration of the alleged Norwegian origin of the paper clip culminated in 1999, one hundred years after Vaaler submitted his application for a German patent. A commemorative stamp was issued that year, the first in a series to draw attention to Norwegian inventiveness. The background shows a facsimile of the German "Patentschrift". However, the figure in the foreground is not the paper clip depicted on that document, but the much better known "Gem". In 2005, the national biographical encyclopedia of Norway (Norsk biografisk leksikon) published the biography of Johan Vaaler, stating he was the inventor of the paper clip.

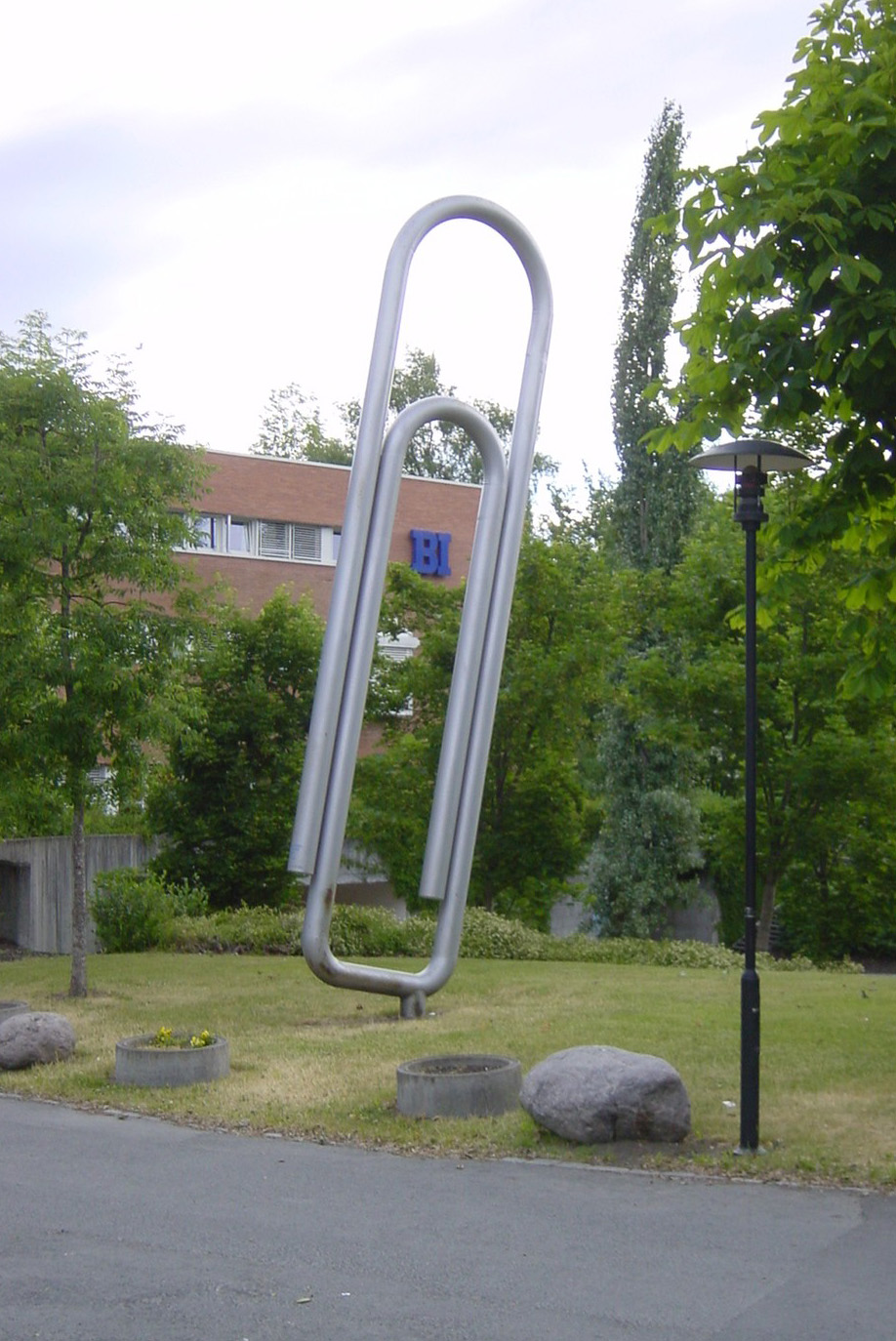
The giant paper clip in Sandvika, Norway; it shows the Gem, not the one patented by Vaaler

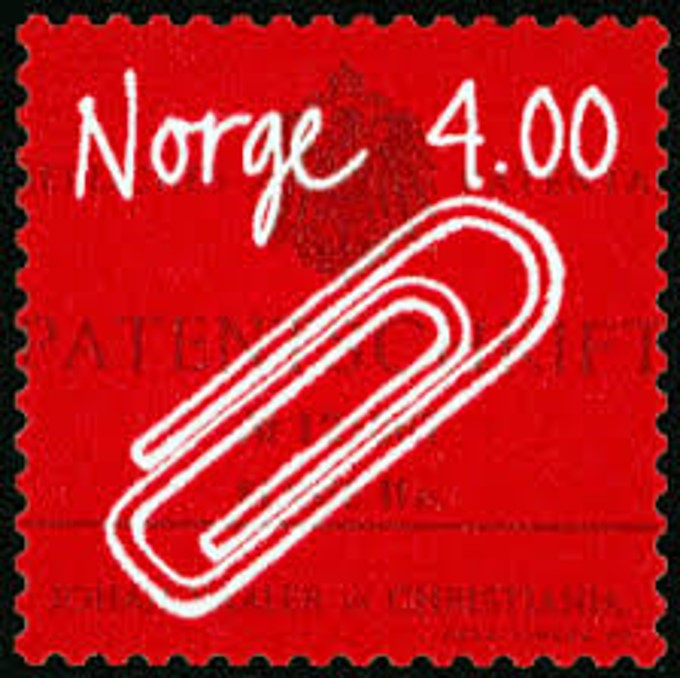
Postage stamp issued in 1999 to commemorate Vaaler's paper clip. In the background his German "Patentschrift". 1901; the depicted paper clip is not the one he invented, but the successful Gem clip

== Other uses ==
Wire is versatile in its nature. Thus a paper clip is a useful accessory in many kinds of mechanical work, including computer work: the metal wire can be unfolded with a little force. Several devices call for a very thin rod to push a recessed button which the user might only rarely need. This is seen on most CD-ROM drives as an "emergency eject" should the power fail; also on early floppy disk drives (including the early Macintosh). Various smartphones require the use of a long, thin object such as a paper clip to eject the SIM card and some Palm PDAs advise the use of a paper clip to reset the device. The trackball can be removed from early Logitech pointing devices using a paper clip as the key to the bezel. A paper clip bent into a "U" can be used to start an ATX power supply without a motherboard by shorting the green PS_ON wire to a black ground wire. One or more paper clips can make a loopback device for a RS-232 interface (or indeed many interfaces). A paper clip could be installed in a Commodore 1541 disk drive as a flexible head-stop. The steel wire from a paperclip can be used in dentistry to form a dental post. Pipe smokers, including cannabis smokers use straightened paper clips to unclog a pipe or bong bowl.

Another creative use of paper clips is in "paperclip art", where enthusiasts bend and twist paper clips into intricate designs and figures, ranging from simple shapes to detailed sculptures. This form of art showcases the flexibility and adaptability of the paper clip beyond its traditional use. Additionally, paper clips can serve as temporary bookmarks in books or documents. Their slim profile and easy placement make them useful for marking a specific page or section without causing damage or adding bulk.

Paper clips can be bent into a crude but sometimes effective lock picking device. Some types of handcuffs can be unfastened using paper clips. There are two approaches. The first one is to unfold the clip in a line and then twist the end in a right angle, trying to imitate a key and using it to lift the lock fixator. The second approach, which is more feasible but needs some practice, is to use the semi-unfolded clip kink for lifting when the clip is inserted through the hole where the handcuffs are closed. A paper clip image is the standard image for an attachment in an email client.

== Trade ==
In 1994, the United States imposed anti-dumping tariffs against China on paper clips.

== Other fastening devices ==
- Binder clip
- Brass fastener
- Bulldog clip
- Staple
- Treasury tag

== See also ==
- Clippy – an anthropomorphic paper clip assistant in Microsoft Office
- Universal Paperclips – a game based on a thought experiment where the user plays the role of an AI programmed to produce paperclips
- Operation Paperclip
- Paper Clips Project – project where a small town American school wished to understand the grand scale of 6,000,000 Jews murdered during the Holocaust by collecting 6,000,000 (and more) physical objects, deciding to collect paperclips because of their small size and easy availability
