= Klip =

Klip may refer to:

- KLIP, a radio station licensed to Monroe, Louisiana, United States
- "Klip" (song), a 2016 song by Jimilian
- Klip River (Gauteng), a river tributary of the Vaal in South Africa
- Klip River (KwaZulu-Natal), a tributary of the Tugela in South Africa
- A file format and product used by the Klipfolio dashboard
- Clip (film) (Serbian: Klip), a 2012 Serbian film

== See also ==
- Clip (disambiguation)
