= Joseph F. Cotton =

American military test pilot

Colonel Joseph F. Cotton
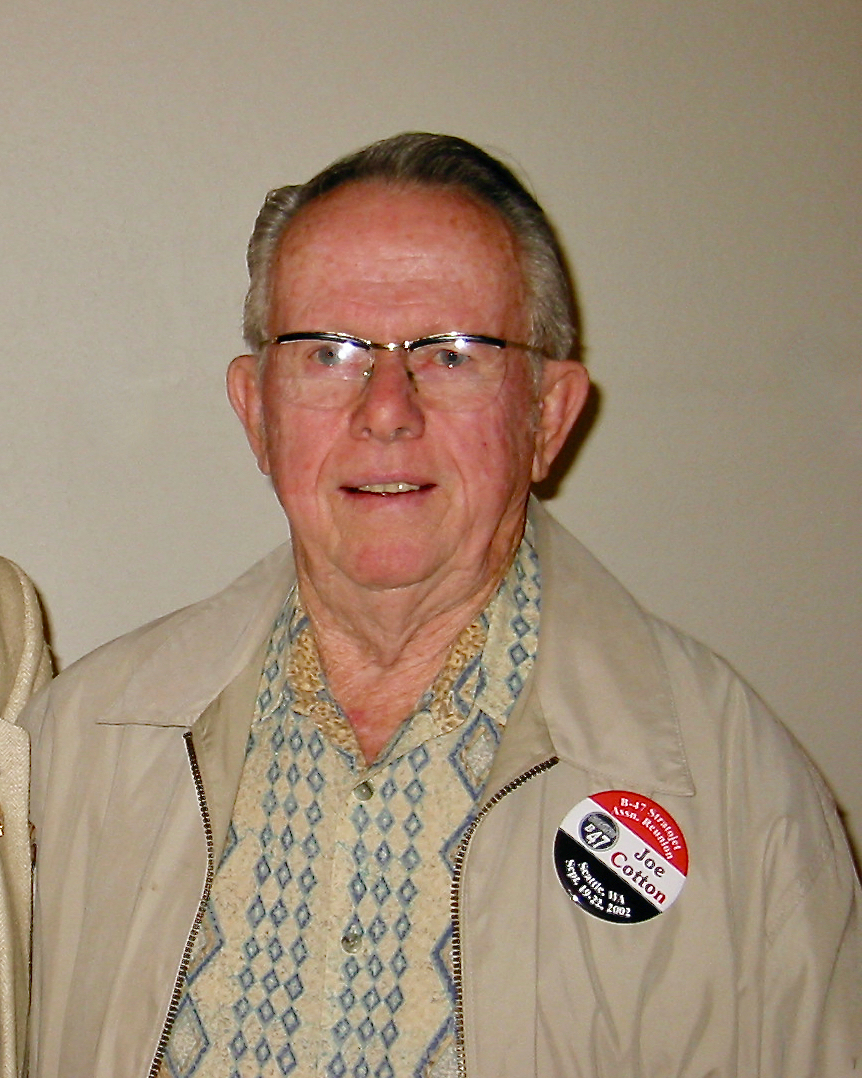
- Cotton in 2002
- Born: Joseph Frederick Cotton; January 22, 1922; Rushville, Indiana, U.S.
- Died: May 5, 2016 (aged 94); Atherton, California, U.S.
- Spouse: Rema Nelson (1944–2016; his death) (3 children)
- Military career
- Allegiance: United States
- Branch: United States Army Air Forces; United States Air Force
- Service years: 1942–66 (24 years)
- Rank: Colonel
- Nickname: Joe
- Conflicts: World War II; Cold War
- Awards: See below
- Other work: Flight instructor, Airline pilot

Joseph Frederick Cotton (January 21, 1922 – May 5, 2016) was an American military test pilot.

== Early life ==
Cotton was born in Rushville, Indiana, on January 21, 1922, the only son of Mr. and Mrs. Joseph A. Cotton. Cotton was a graduate of Manilla High School where he was a member of the basketball team and a 4H club member. He lived in Rush County and helped his father with work on the family farm until he reached the age of 20.

== Military service ==
In his first combat mission, in November 1943, the plane he was co-piloting crash-landed on the island of Corfu after being hit by anti-aircraft fire. After four months the crew members were able to escape with the help of Italian allies, and Mr. Cotton was sent back to the U.S. to recover from malaria and return to flight school to become a flight instructor.

He later attended the Empire Test Pilot School, and eventually was the chief test pilot for the Air Force. He was head of the B-58 Hustler and XB-70 test programs, and was flying in the ill-fated formation flight that resulted in the loss of XB-70 A/V2 on June 8, 1966. He retired from the Air Force in 1968 having been involved in aeronautical research for 22 of his 26 years.

== Awards and decorations ==
Badges, patches and tabs
	U.S. Air Force Command Pilot Badge
Personal decorations
Width-44 crimson ribbon with a pair of width-2 white stripes on the edges	Legion of Merit
	Air Medal - for his actions during an emergency with the XB-70 when he extended the jammed nose gear by use of a legal-style paper clip.
	Air Force Commendation Medal
	American Campaign Medal
	European-African-Middle Eastern Campaign Medal
	World War II Victory Medal
	National Defense Service Medal with star
	Air Force Longevity Service Ribbon

=== Other achievements ===
- 1966 - "Pilot of the Year"
- 1997 - Enshired on the Aerospace Walk of Honor in Lancaster, California
- 2016 - A bridge near his hometown is named in his honor, and was dedicated on July 4th, 2017.

== Post-military career ==
Cotton was hired as an engineering flight test pilot for United after his military retirement. In total, he flew more than 16,000 flight hours in 80 different military bombers, fighters, transports, and civilian aircraft.

Cotton died on May 5, 2016, survived by his wife Rema, and three children.
