= Clipper (video game) =

1983 video game

- Developer: John S. Bayes
- Publishers: Program Design, Inc.
- Platform: Atari 8-bit
- Release: 1983

Clipper is a video game written by John S. Bayes for Atari 8-bit computers and published by Program Design, Inc. in 1983.

== Gameplay ==
Title screen

Clipper is a game in which the player is the Captain of an 1850s clipper in a sailing simulation.

== Reception ==
Mark Bausman reviewed the game for Computer Gaming World, and stated that "The game plays well but I found the constant shifts in wind to be a bit frustrating. The instruction book is very helpful and gives many hints on how to play this game. It also includes a little historical background on Clipper ships and a playing aid to help novice sailors keep their Clipper on course."
