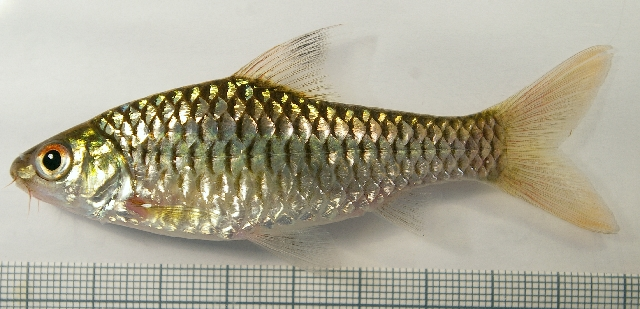

Conservation status
- Least Concern (IUCN 3.1)

Scientific classification
- Kingdom: Animalia
- Phylum: Chordata
- Class: Actinopterygii
- Order: Cypriniformes
- Family: Cyprinidae
- Subfamily: Smiliogastrinae
- Genus: Enteromius
- Species: E. callipterus

Binomial name
- Enteromius callipterus Boulenger, 1907

Synonyms
- Barbus callipterus Boulenger, 1907; Barbodes callipterus (Boulenger, 1907); Puntius callipterus (Boulenger, 1907)

= Clipper barb =

Species of fish

The clipper barb (Enteromius callipterus) or Congo barb is a freshwater and brackish tropical fish belonging to the minnow family (Cyprinidae). Its native habitat is from Côte d'Ivoire through the Chad Basin to Nigeria and Cameroon. It was originally described as Barbus callipterus by Boulenger in 1907.

The clipper barb grows to a maximum length of 3 in (7.6 cm) and a maximum weight of 0.18 oz (5.0 g). It has a slightly convex dorsal profile and short anterior barbels that do not extend beyond the eye. It has a light silverish-golden body, darker on the back. The dorsal and caudal fins have a red-orange base, all other fins are colorless. It has a black spot on the first few rays of the dorsal fin, the tip of those rays are colorless.

Clipper barbs natively live in a tropical environment and prefer freshwater an ideal temperature range of 66–77 °F (19–25 °C).

The clipper barb is of commercial interest in the aquarium industry.

== See also ==
- List of freshwater aquarium fish species
