= Clipping (gardening) =

Removing unwanted portions from a plant

In gardening, clipping is equivalent to pruning, the practice of removing diseases, over mature or otherwise unwanted portions from a plant. Clipping usually involves, much less removal than pruning, and is used more for herbaceous (all-green) plants than for woody ones.
