= Binder clip =

Device for binding sheets of paper together

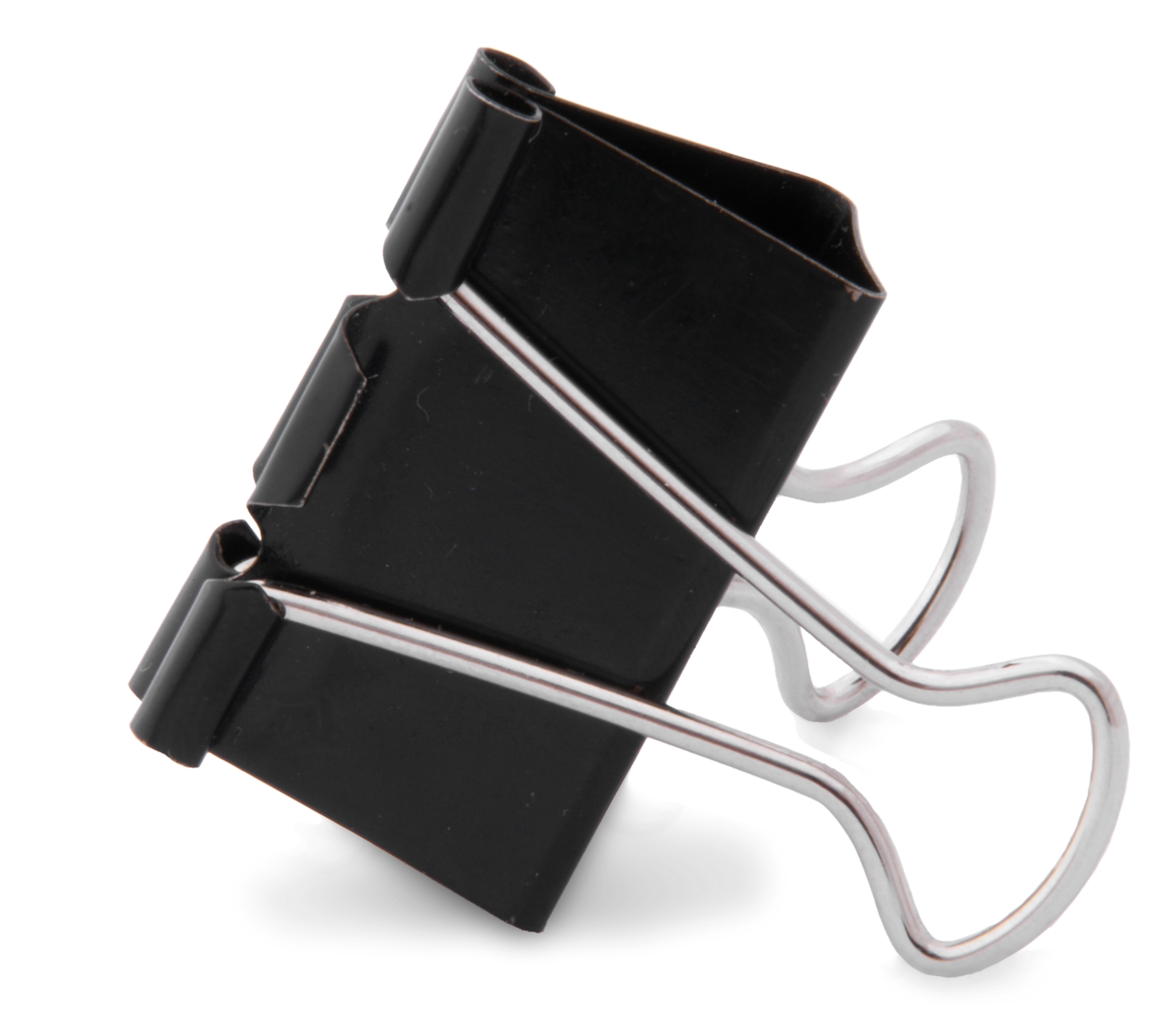
Binder clip

A binder clip (also known as a foldback clip, paper clamp, banker's clip, foldover clip, bobby clip, bulldog clip or clasp) is a simple device for binding sheets of paper together. It leaves the paper intact and can be removed quickly and easily, unlike the staple.

It is also sometimes referred to as a handbag clip because of resemblance to a handbag when its clips are folded up.

== Characteristics and methods of use ==
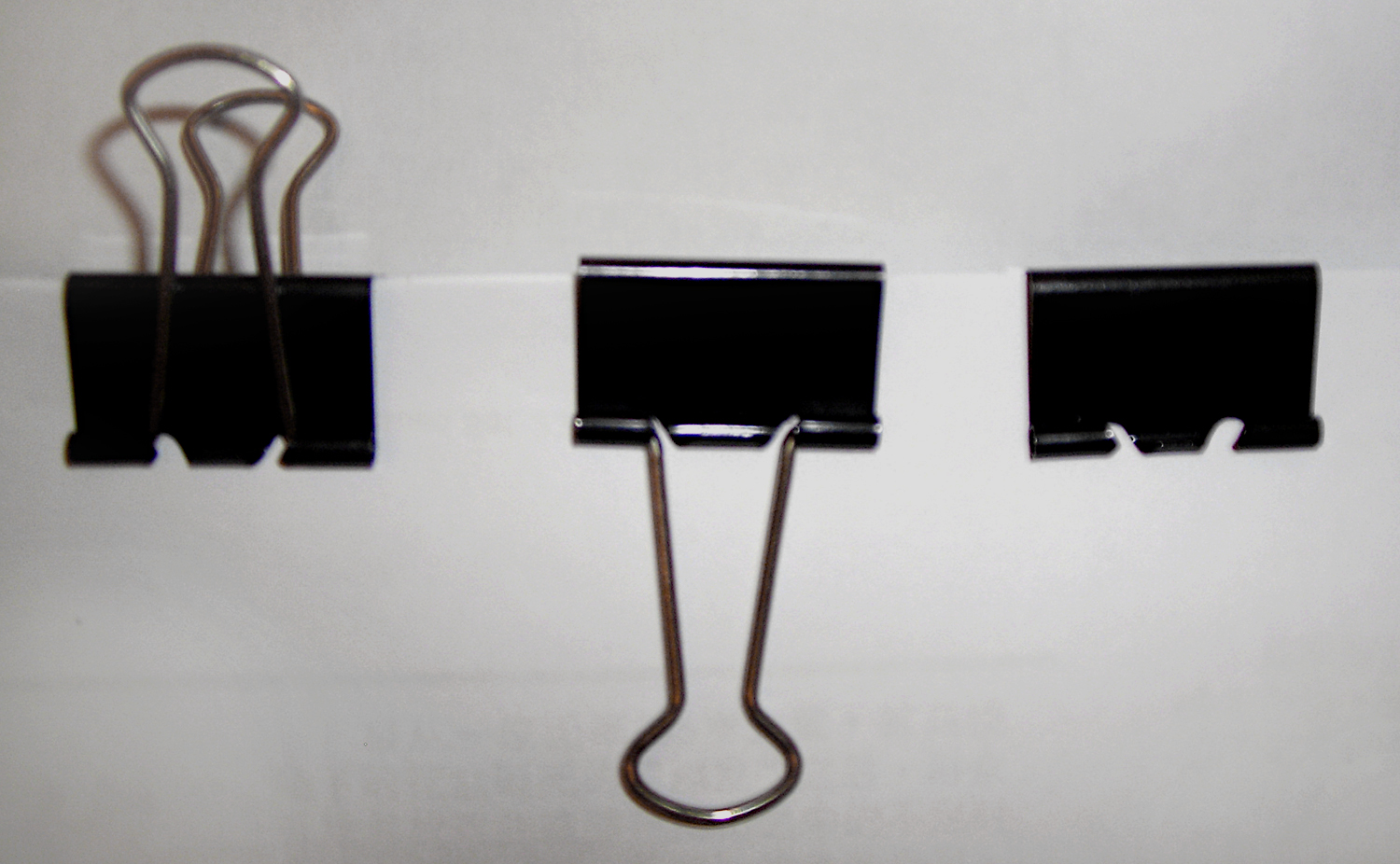
The handles can be folded down once the clip has been attached, and may be removed for a semi-permanent binding.

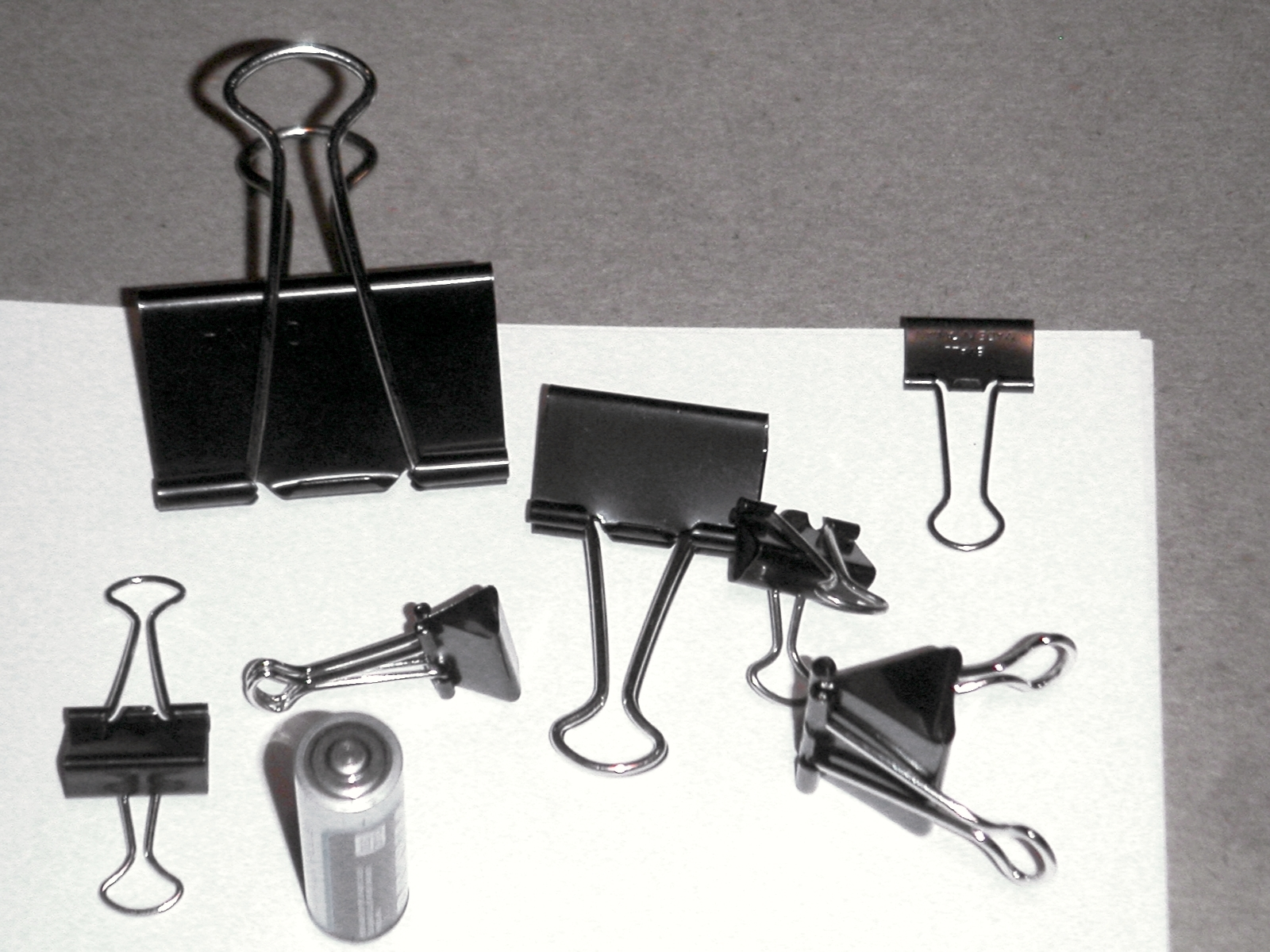
An assortment of binder clips, with an AA battery for scale

A binder clip is a strip of spring steel bent into the shape of an isosceles triangle with loops at the apex. Tension along the base of the triangle forces the two sides closed, and the loops prevent the sharp steel edges from cutting into the paper. The loops also serve to hold two pieces of stiff wire, which are used as handles and allow the clip to be opened. The two slots cut in each loop are shaped so that the wire handles can be folded down once the clip has been attached, and the spring force of the wire holds them down on the surface of the paper. This holds the clip relatively flat, for easier stacking of papers. One handle can also be folded down while the other remains up to allow the stack of papers to be hung up. The handles can also be removed altogether by squeezing them sideways and pulling them out, allowing for more permanent binding. As compared to a paper clip, the binder clip is able to bind sheets of paper more securely, and is also resistant to rust.

There are several sizes of binder clips, ranging from a base size of 5 millimetres (0.2 in) to 50 mm (1.97 in). The sheet steel portion is customarily black oxide coated, but a variety of decorative painted color schemes are also available. The sheet steel portion is occasionally made of stainless steel, the more typical spring steel can also be finished in nickel, silver or gold. The handles are normally nickel-plated.

== Uses ==
The binder clip is in common use in the modern office. It can hold a few to many sheets of paper, and is usually used in place of the paper clip for large volumes of paper. Various practical (and sometimes whimsical) alternative uses have been proposed. These include holding pieces of quilt together, creating a "beer pyramid" in a refrigerator with wire shelves, serving as a bookmark, a cheap alternative to a money clip or preventing computer cables from slipping behind desks. Smaller sized clips have been commonly used as "quick fix" fitting and sizing solutions in the fashion industry.

In 1966, test pilot Joseph F. Cotton used the shiny metal portion of such a clip to short-circuit an electrical circuit panel to force the landing gear of the XB-70 bomber to open on a flight. The object is such a common sight in offices that, in late 2020, when restrictions due to the COVID-19 pandemic were lowered and people started returning to their offices, some missed and enjoyed the feeling of using a binder clip, after months without doing so. At around the same time, healthcare workers in at least one medical center used extra large binder clips as a cheap way to secure a plastic curtain between workers and patients infected with the airborne virus.

Another innovative use of the binder clip in structural engineering has been demonstrated by Purdue University researchers, where the metal Ω-shaped clip components were installed in modified additively manufactured barrel-shaped tracks that attach to structural panels. These modified spring-track systems were named Binder-Clip Inspired (BCI) bistable units. The bistable nature of the spring-track system has been utilized as a revolute joint degree of freedom passive control mechanism, where the panels are forced into an open and a folded position, rotating by 180 degrees with the simple actuation of the clip and staying in the open or folded positions due to the strain energy minima of the spring-track system. Another version of the spring-track system was modified as a multistable revolute joint passive control mechanism and applied on a small fan-like thin wing to enable the wing to switch between a cruise (flat) and takeoff/landing (cambered) high-lift coefficient configuration, all while successfully retaining each state under simulated and real aerodynamic loading (as demonstrated in wind tunnel tests).

== History ==
In 1909, the method of binding sheets of paper together was either to sew them together or to punch holes in them and tie them together with string. It was therefore time-consuming to remove a single sheet of paper from multiple bound sheets.

The binder clip was invented and patented in 1910 by Louis E. Baltzley, a Washington, D.C. area resident, to help his father, a writer and inventor, hold his manuscripts together more easily. While similar designs have since been patented five times, the most produced version remains the U.S. patent 1,139,627. Baltzley produced the clips through the L.E.B. Manufacturing Company, and these early clips are stamped "L.E.B." on one side. Manufacturing rights were later licensed to other companies.

== Gallery ==
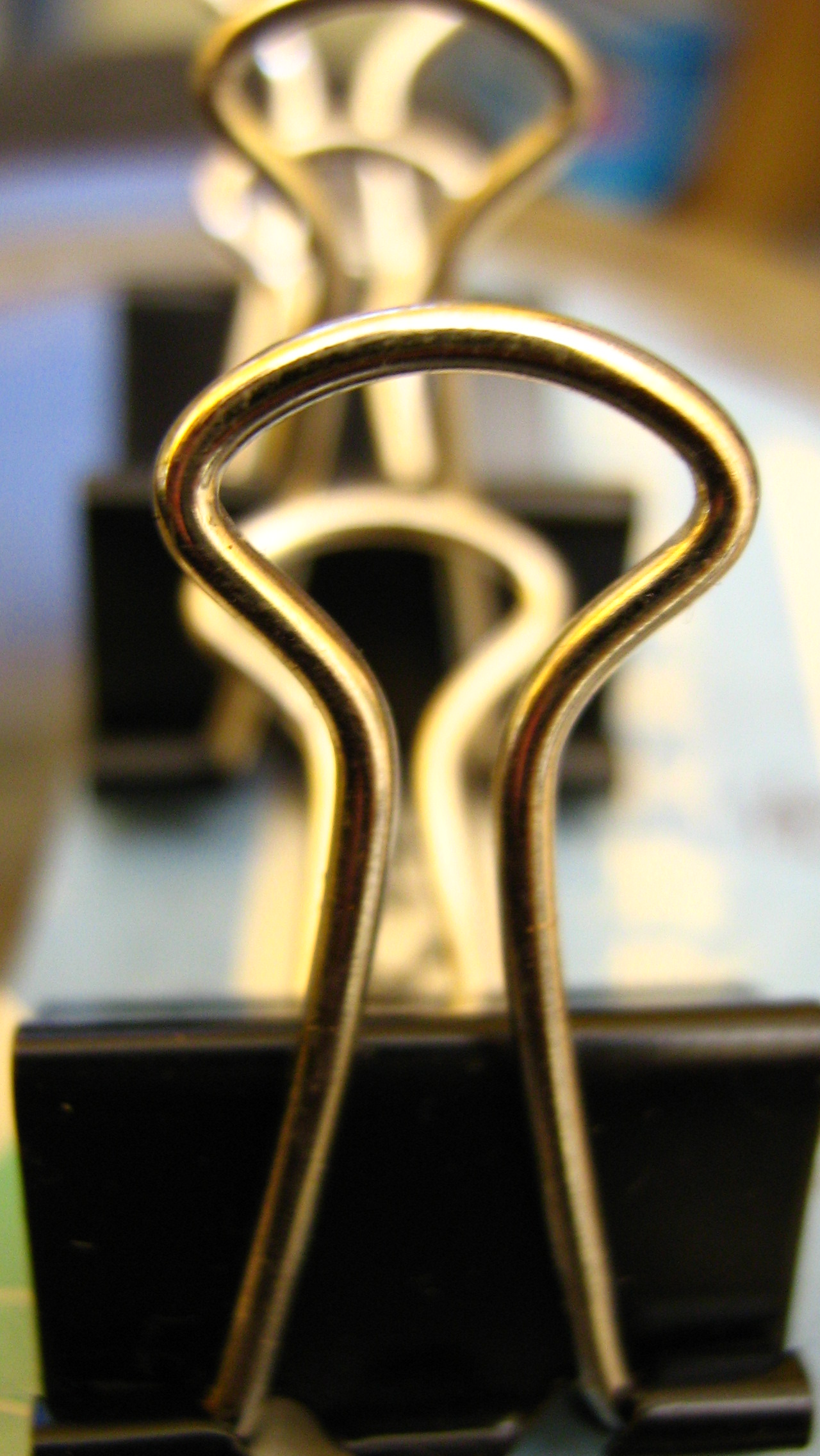
Clip with golden loops

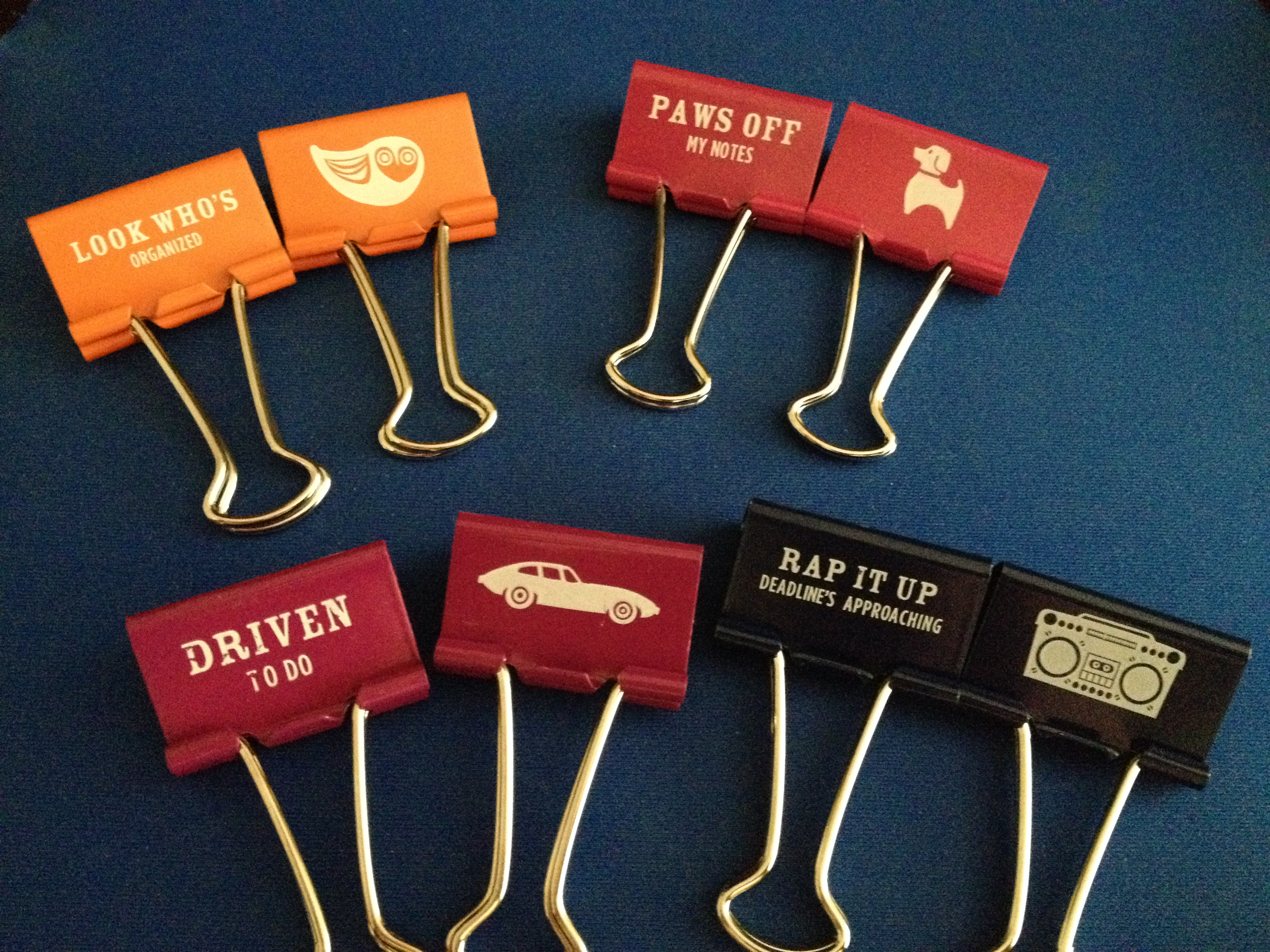
Colorful thematic binder clips

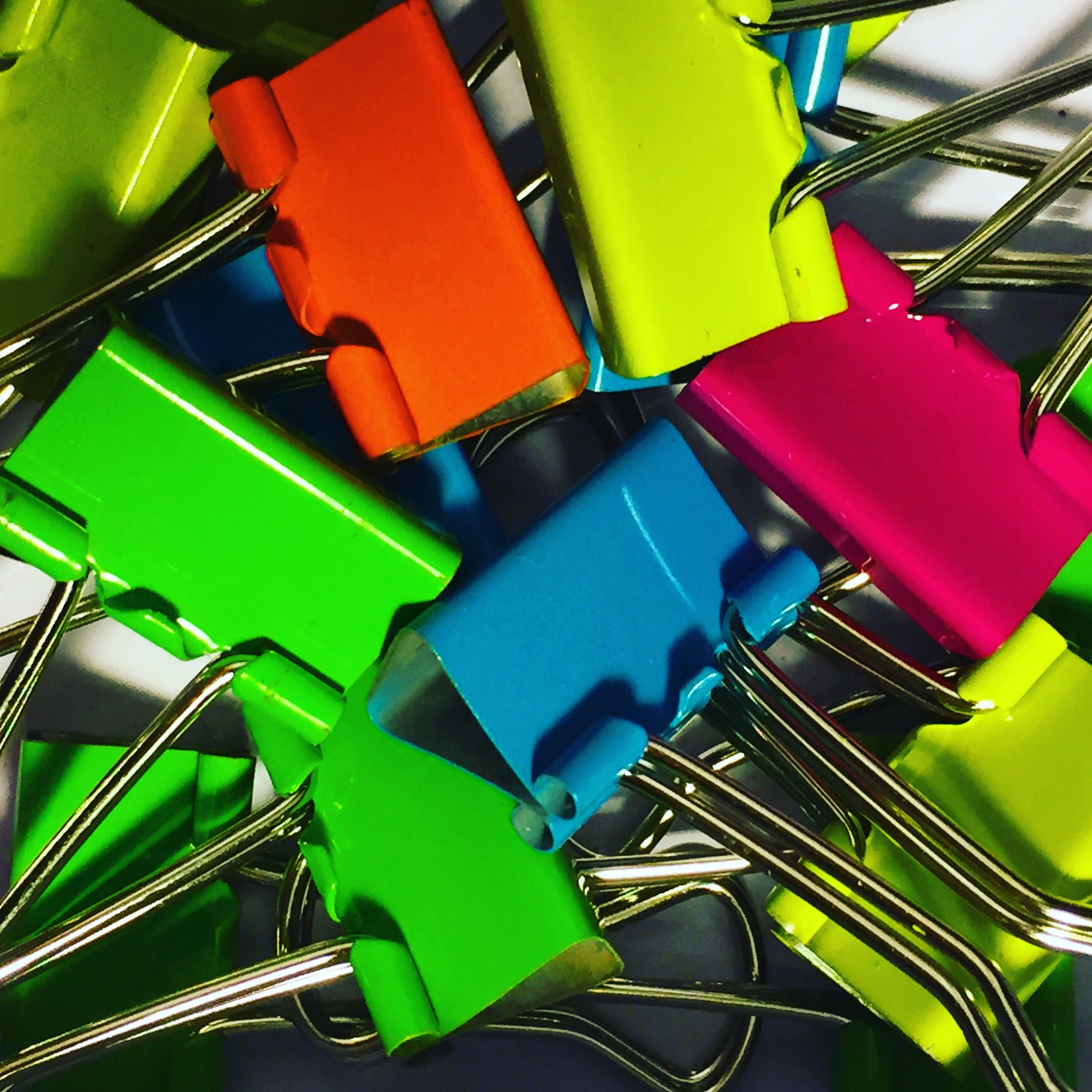
Colorful binder clips

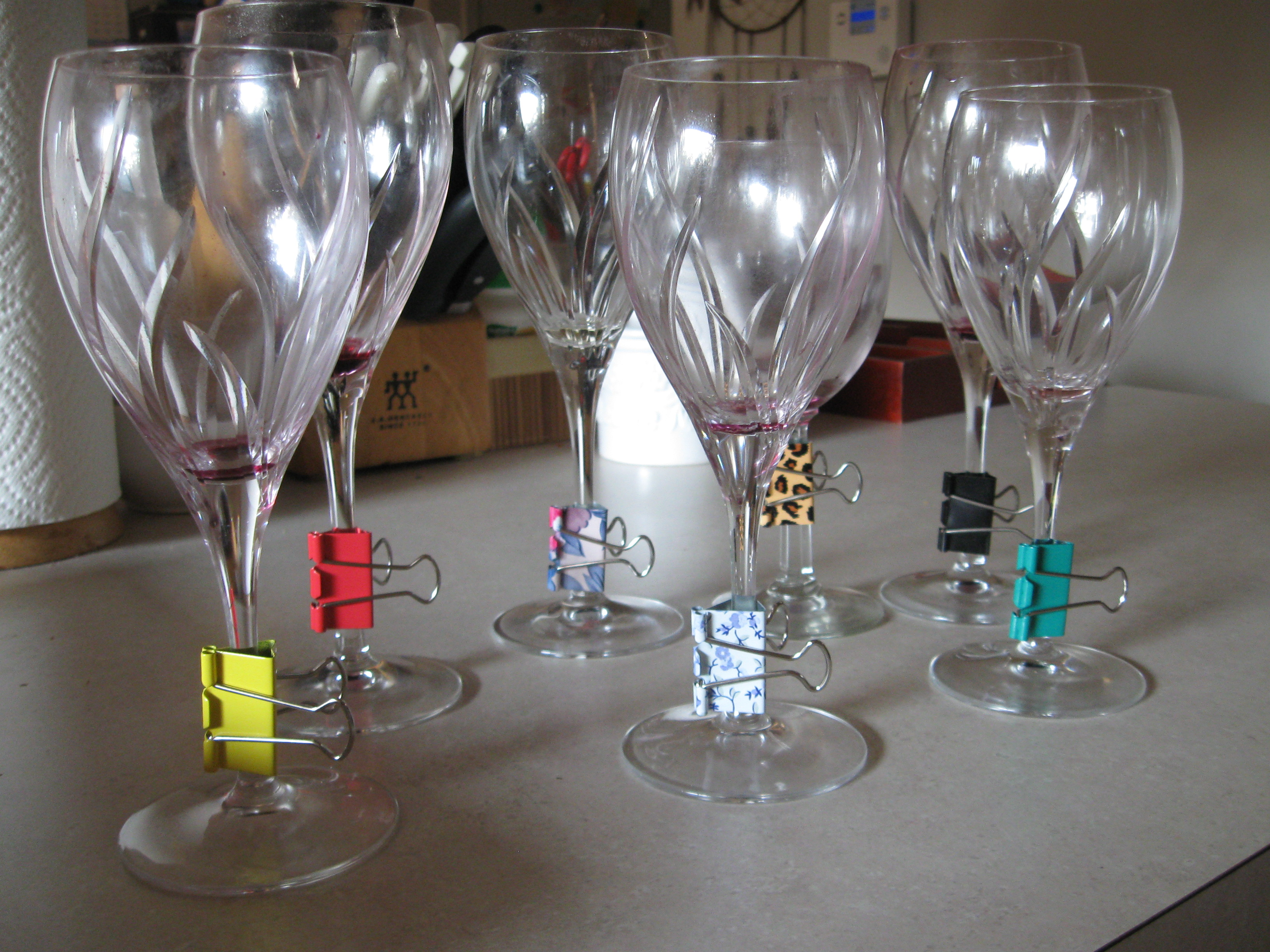
Used to mark drinking glasses at a party

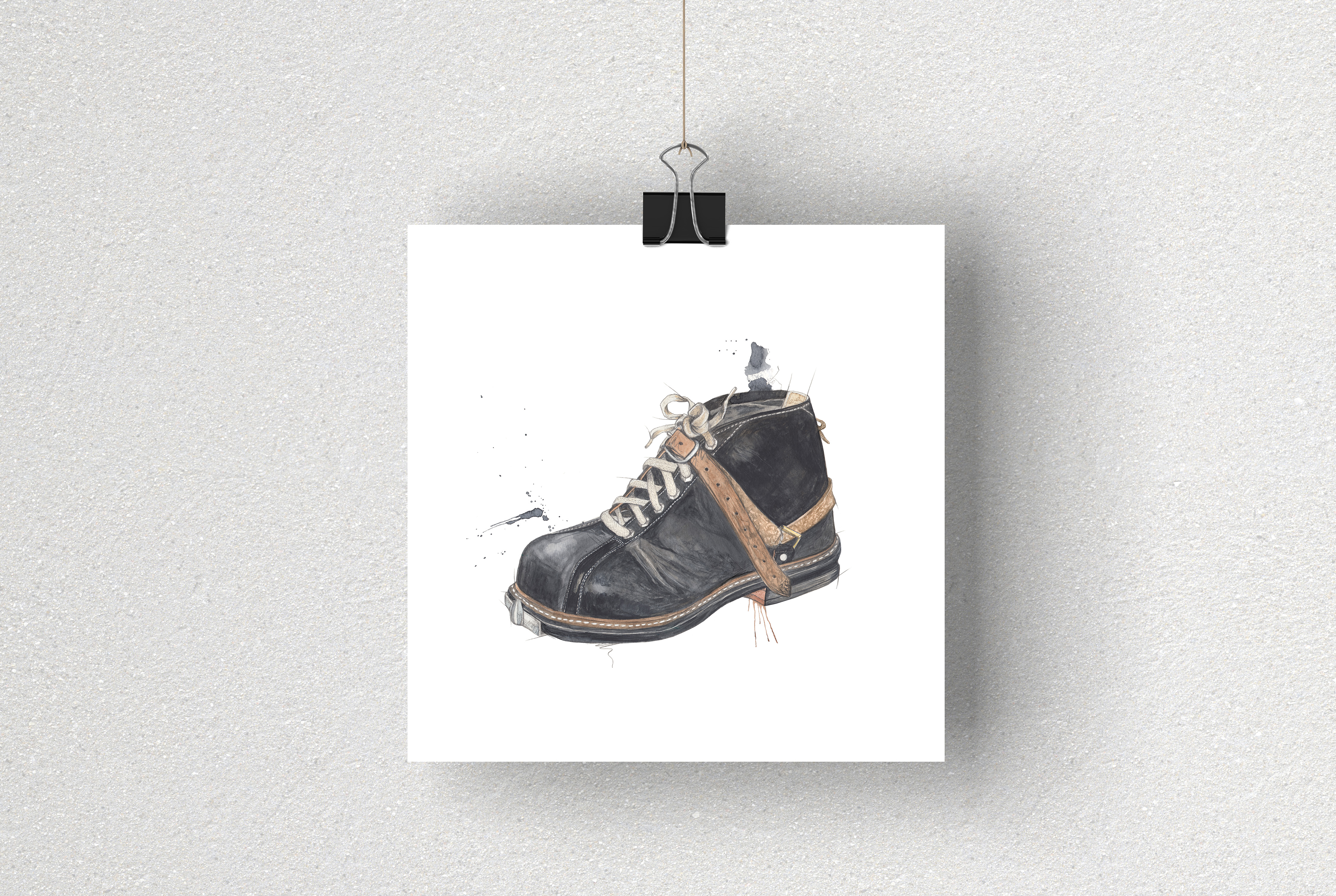
Used to hang a drawing

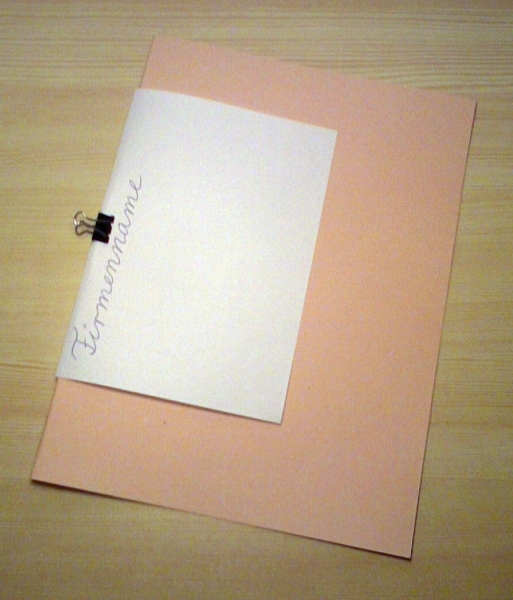
Used to attach a piece of paper to an envelope

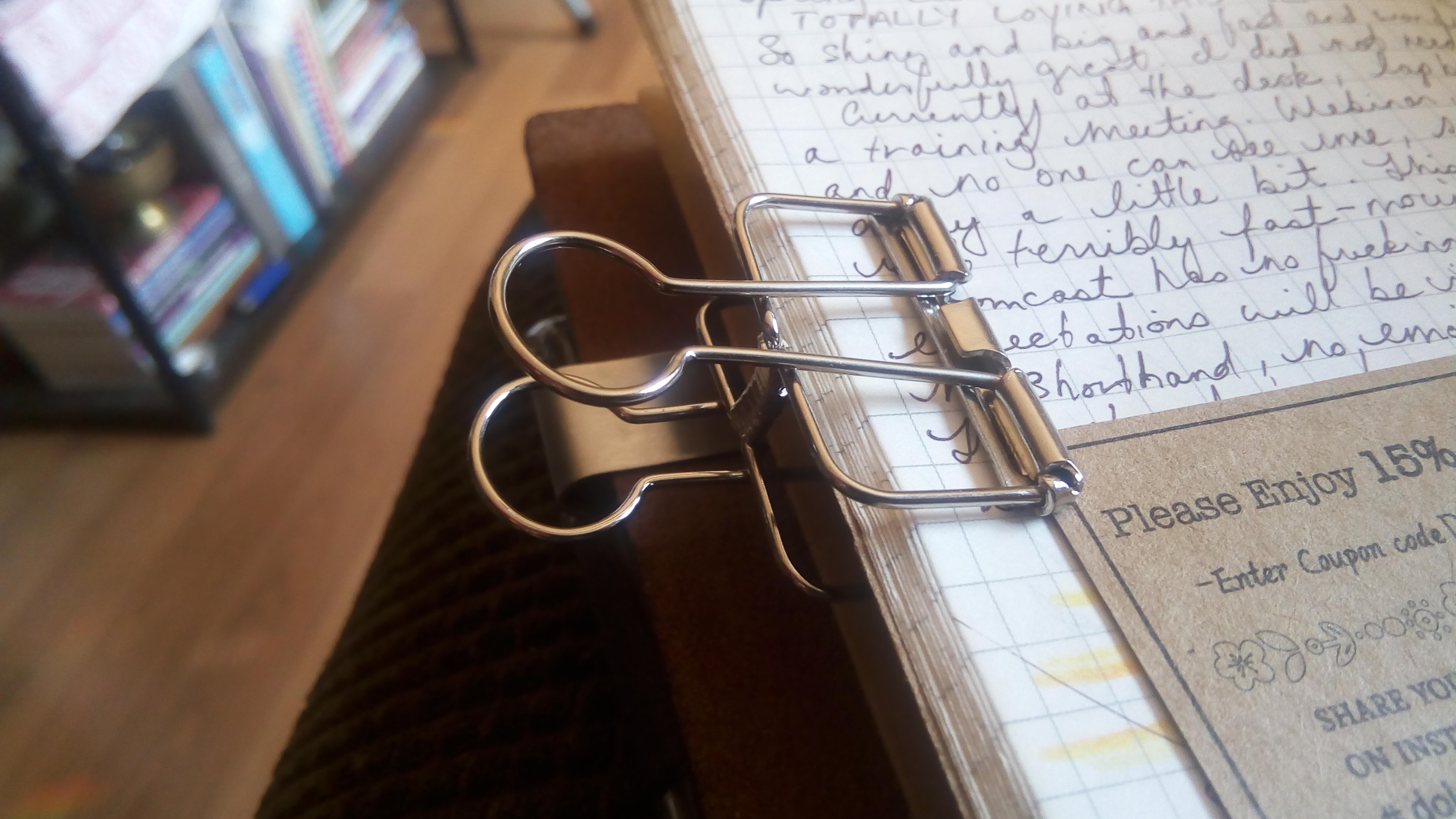
Used to hold pages of a notebook

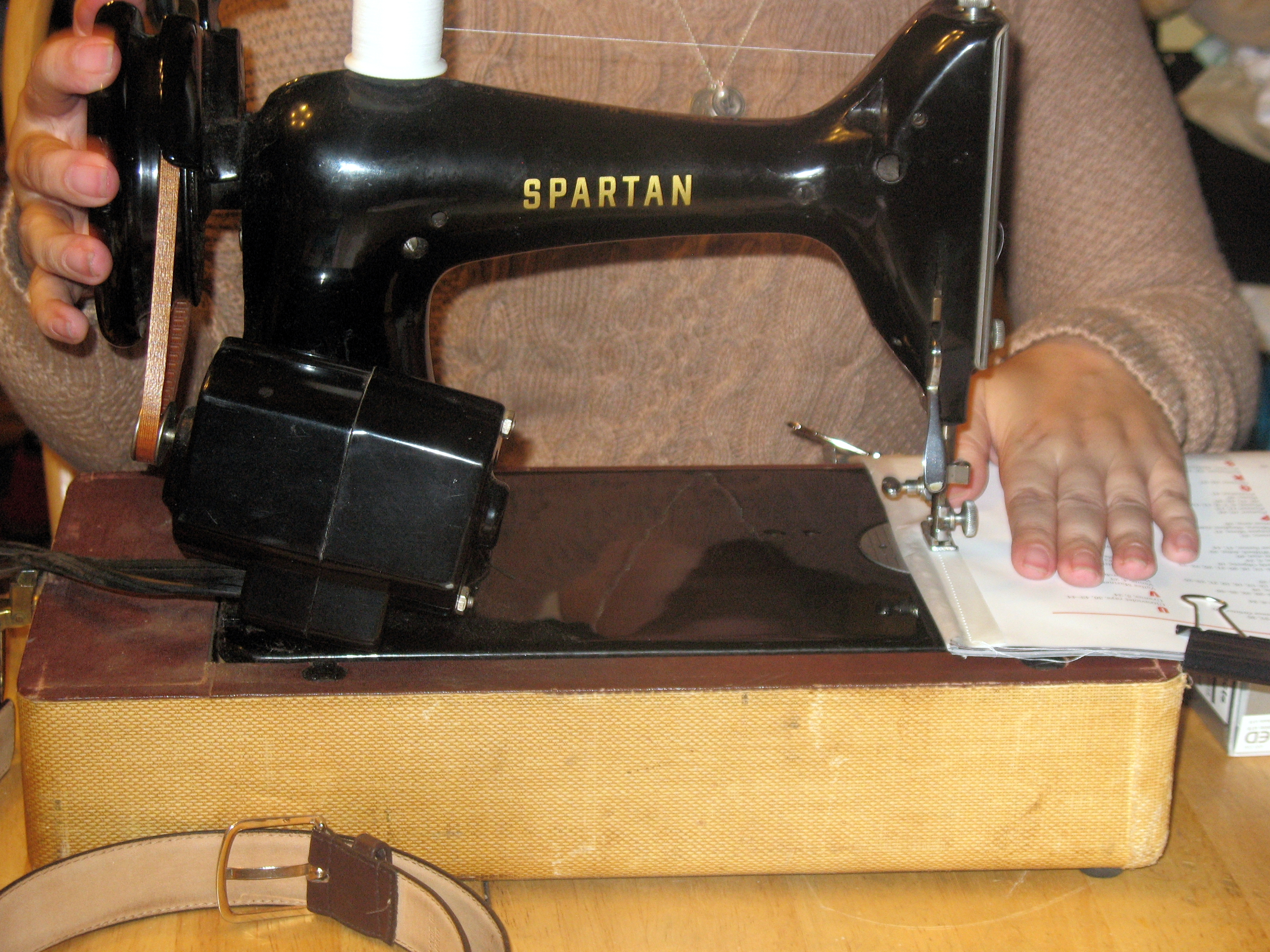
Used during restoration of a book

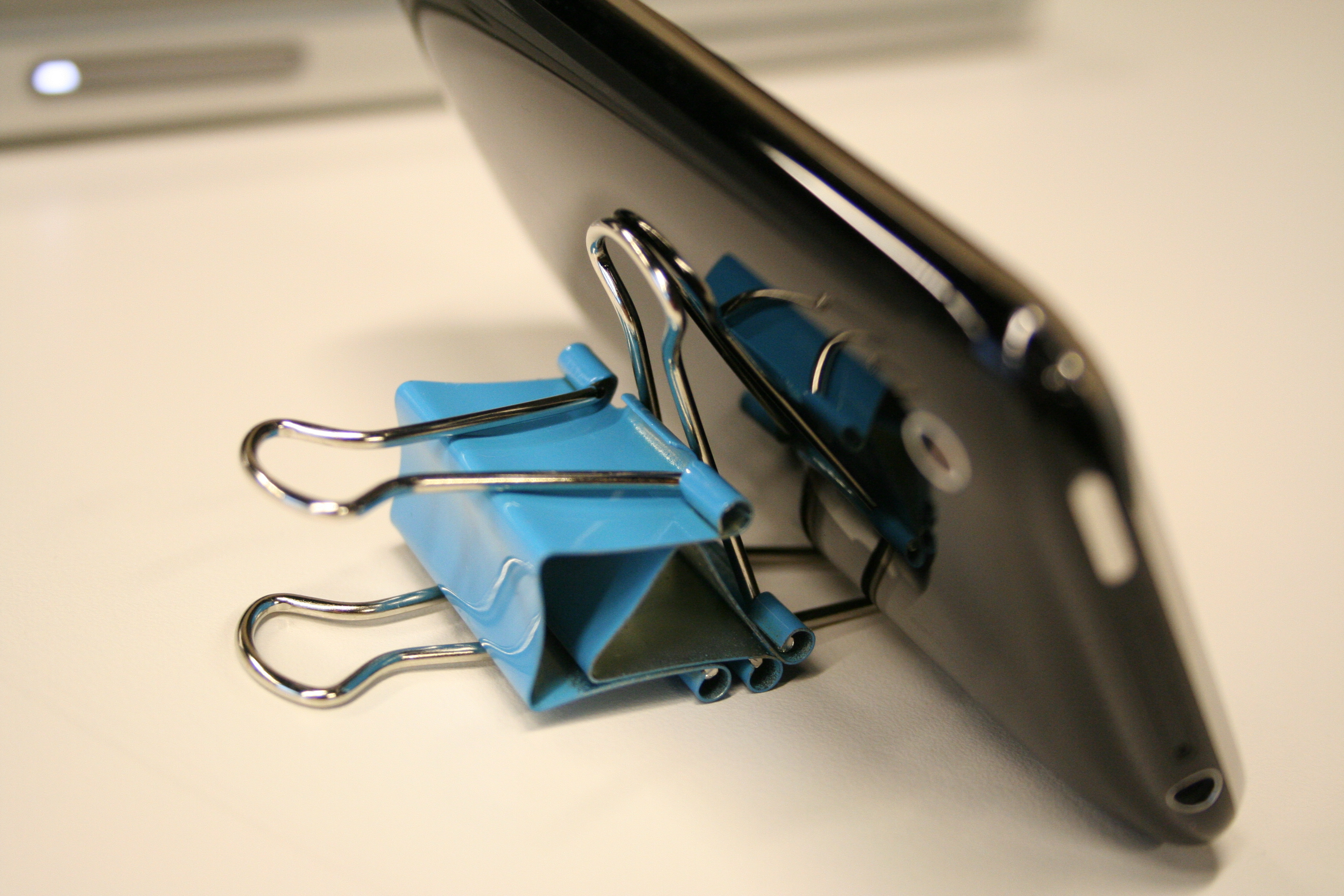
Used as a DIY cellphone stand

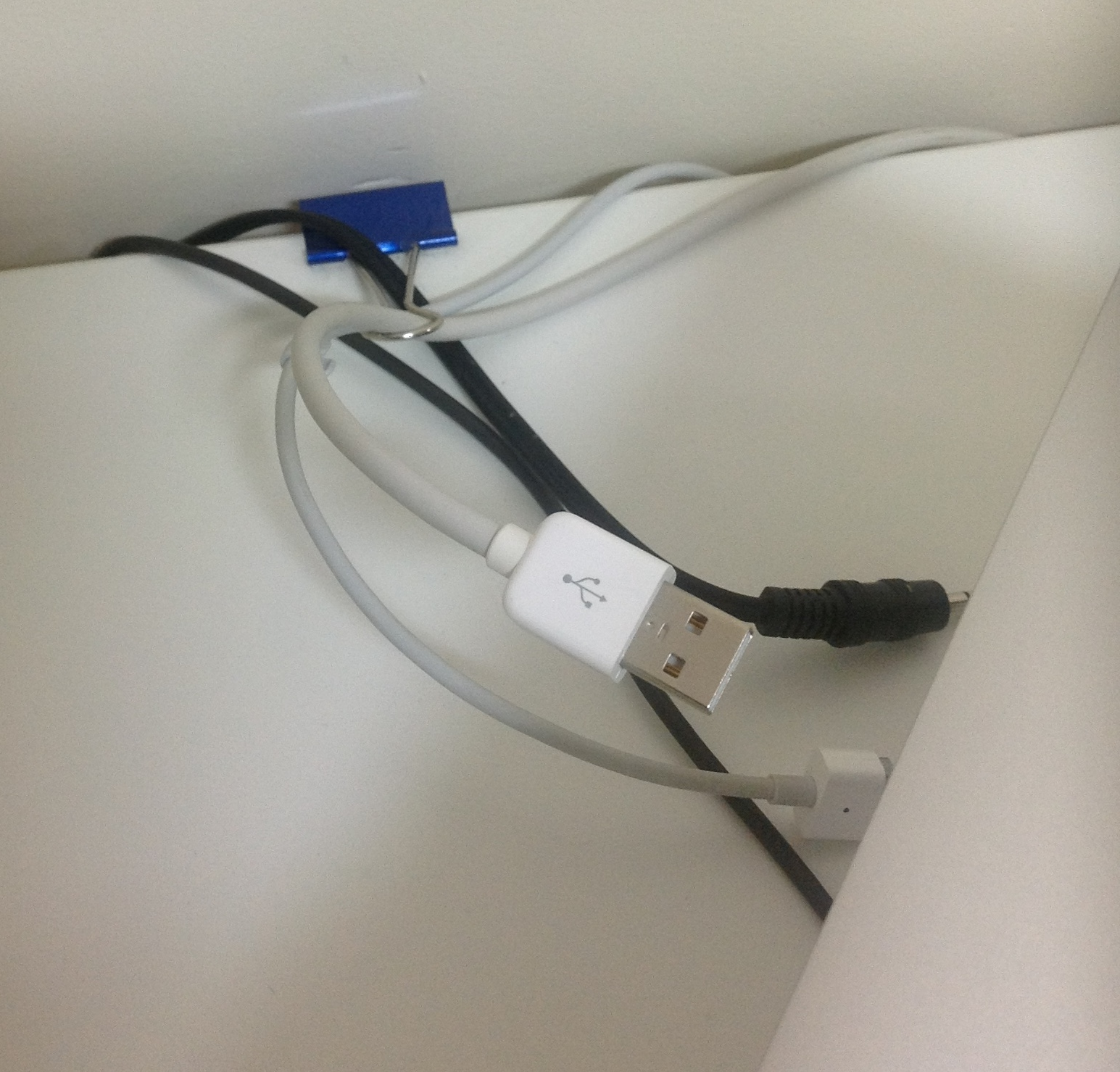
Used as a cable tidy

== See also ==
- Bulldog clip
- Clipboard
- Treasury tag
