= Clipper (nickname) =

Clipper is a nickname for:

- Clipper Flynn (1849–1881), American professional baseball player
- Felipe Montemayor (born 1928), Mexican player in Major League Baseball
- John "Clipper" Smith (1904–1973), American football player, coach and college athletics administrator; member of the College Football Hall of Fame
- Maurice J. "Clipper" Smith (1898–1984), American football player and coach of football, basketball and baseball

== See also ==
- Joe DiMaggio (1914–1999), American Hall-of-Fame Major League Baseball player nicknamed the "Yankee Clipper"
- Larry Kwong (1923–2018), first Chinese Canadian to play in the National Hockey League, nicknamed the "China Clipper"
- Norman Kwong (1929–2016), first Chinese Canadian to play in the Canadian Football League, sports executive and Lieutenant Governor of Alberta, nicknamed the "China Clipper"
