= Clipper (steam automobile) =

Defunct American motor vehicle manufacturer

Clipper and Michigan were the name of an early steam car built in Grand Rapids, Michigan in 1901 and 1902.

== History ==
The first car designed by Byron C. Carter and placed on the market was the Michigan steam car. Occasionally called the Carter Steam Stanhope, it was a small car with a victoria top, tufted leather seat and a grained leather dash. Lever steered it's sported 32-inch wire wheels, and the price complete was $1,000 (equivalent to $38,700 in 2025).

The car was built only in 1901, by the Michigan Automobile Company at 45 Monroe Street in Grand Rapids. In 1902 Byron Carter returned to Jackson, Michigan to develop the Jaxon steam car and the Jackson gasoline automobile. In 1902 Elmer Pratt renamed the company as Clipper Autocar Company and moved it to the Clipper Bicycle factory. The Clipper Steam car was nearly identical to the Michigan steam car design developed by Carter. The company built only a few Clippers before it failed later in 1902.
