= Yankee Clipper =

Yankee Clipper can refer to:

== Arts and entertainment ==
- The Yankee Clipper (film), a 1927 maritime adventure film
- A Marvel Comics superhero active during the 1950s appearing in Marvel: The Lost Generation
- The nickname of Terry Hoitz, a fictional character in the 2010 film The Other Guys
- Yankee Clipper, now named AQUAMAN Splashdown, a hydroflume amusement park ride at Six Flags Great America

== Transportation ==
- Yankee Clipper, a 1939 Pan American Airways Boeing 314 Clipper flying boat
- Yankee Clipper (train), a 1934 passenger train service between New York City and Boston
- Yankee Clipper, special-event passenger train service to Yankees–East 153rd Street (Metro-North station)
- Yankee Clipper (Harbor Cruise), a special-event NY Waterway service
- American Aviation AA-1 Yankee Clipper, a light aircraft in the Grumman American AA-1 series

== Other uses ==
- The nickname of Joe DiMaggio (1914–1999), Major League Baseball player
- Yankee Clipper, the Apollo 12 command module

== See also ==
- Yanky Clippers, a 1929 silent animated film short
