= Bulldog clip =

Type of paper fastener

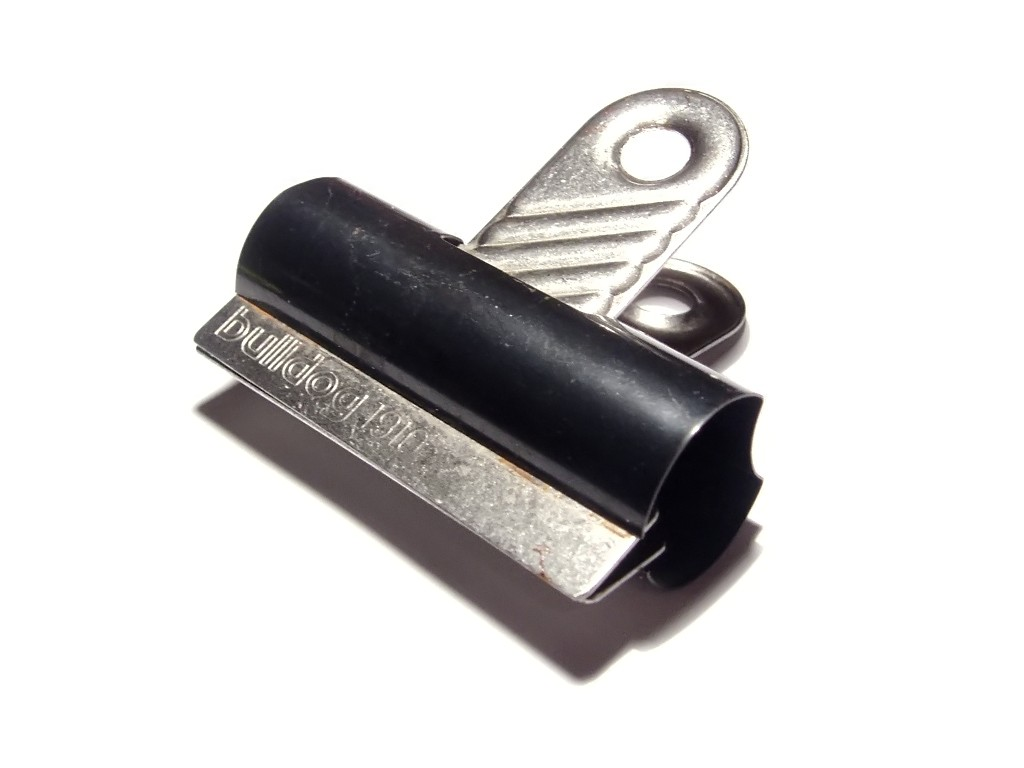
A bulldog clip

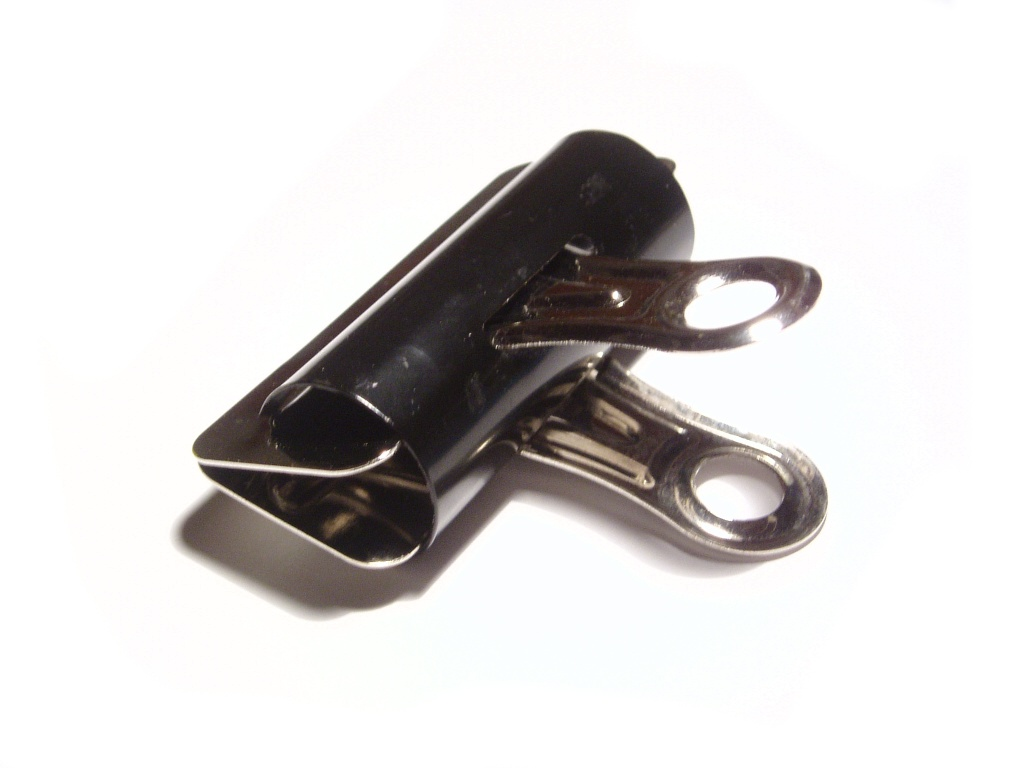
Another picture of a bulldog clip

A bulldog clip is a device for temporarily but firmly binding sheets of paper together. It consists of a rectangular sheet of springy steel curved into a cylinder, with two flat steel strips inserted to form combined handles and jaws. The user presses the two handles together, causing the jaws to open against the force of the spring, then inserts a stack of papers and releases the handles. The spring forces the jaws together, gripping the papers firmly.

A bulldog clip combined with a suitable piece of board makes a clipboard.

== History and trademark ==
BULLDOG is a registered trademark of Brandsley Limited which is licensed to Faire Bros & Co Limited. Its registration as a trademark in the United Kingdom dates back to 1944.

== Alternative uses ==
Bulldog clips can be used in many domestic, industrial, and arts and crafts applications, including:

- The binding of a flip book allowing sheets to be added, removed or replaced.
- A cable tidy at a computer station. The clip can be clamped onto the edge of a desk and computer cables can be threaded through the holes on the end of the tip. This helps the user organize wires and prevents them from falling back behind the desk.
- Resealing an opened bag of food to keep it fresh longer.
- Warping a loom when weaving.
- A fast release mechanism for theatre backdrops.
- Holding an eraser, providing a larger surface to grip for those with motor disabilities.
- Holding down a Ctrl key on a computer keyboard to circumvent the issue of holding the button down when selecting multiple items.
- Pinning back hair on top of a person's head.

== See also ==
- Binder clip
- Clothespin
- Crocodile clip
