= Suite (address) =

Business location within a building

A suite is the location of a business within a shopping mall or office building. The suite's number also serves as a sort of address within an address for purposes of mail delivery and pickup.

Some commercial mail receiving agencies may also use the 'suite' designator to indicate a company's private post-office box by listing it as a suite rather than a post-office box, though by order of the United States Postal Inspection Service, most of the major CMRA companies such as The UPS Store/Mail Boxes Etc. have drawn this down as the result of mail fraud where unscrupulous businesses who count on their targets not researching their addresses market a post-office box 'suite' or virtual office as an actual office location with personnel.

In the US, suite can be abbreviated "STE" or "Ste" in postal addresses.
