= Virtual address (disambiguation) =

Virtual address refers to an address identifying a virtual, i.e. non-physical, entity. For example:

- Virtual address space in computing
- Virtual address translation to physical address in computing
- Virtual postal address, see virtual mailbox or commercial mail receiving agency
- Virtual business address, see Virtual office

== See also ==
- Virtual (disambiguation)
