= Postcodes in New Zealand =

Postcodes in New Zealand consist of four digits, the first two of which specify the area, the third the type of delivery (street, PO Box, Private Bag, or Rural delivery), and the last the specific lobby, RD (rural delivery) number, or suburb. The present postcode system was introduced in New Zealand in June 2006, which, unlike the previous system, applies to all items of mail with effect from June 2008.

This replaced a previous system, introduced in 1977, in which New Zealand Post did not require individual items of mail to include the postcode in the address. Optical character recognition (OCR) enabled automated sorting machines to scan entire addresses, rather than just postcodes, as was the case with older machines. This was very similar to the case in Ireland. OCR technology was introduced in 1992; when the first of seven OCR machines were installed in Auckland, Wellington and Christchurch Mail Centres, most mail was sorted manually.

== Allocation ==
There are 1,856 postcodes, each of which may serve up to 10,000 individual locations. Postcodes are generally allocated north to south.

- 00 – unused
- 01 – Whangarei, Marsden Point, Ngunguru
- 02 – Kawakawa, Kerikeri, Moerewa, Paihia, Russell
- 03 – Dargaville
- 04 – Kaikohe, Kaitaia
- 05 – Mangawhai, Waipu
- 06 – North Shore, West Auckland (urban); West Auckland (PO box); south-western Central Auckland
- 07 – North Shore, West Auckland (rural); North Shore (PO Box)
- 08 – Helensville, Kumeu
- 09 – Hibiscus Coast, Warkworth, Wellsford, Snells Beach; Great Barrier Island
- 10 – Central Auckland, Waiheke Island (urban), Rakino Island
- 11 – Central Auckland (PO box, central)
- 12 – Central Auckland (PO box, western bays)
- 13 – Central Auckland (PO box, inner south-west)
- 14 – Central Auckland (PO box, outer south-west)
- 15 – Central Auckland (PO box, inner south-east)
- 16 – Central Auckland (PO box, outer-south-east)
- 17 – Central Auckland (PO box, eastern bays)
- 18 – Waiheke Island (PO box)
- 19 – Waiheke Island (rural)
- 20 – South Auckland (urban, north and east)
- 21 – South Auckland, Pukekohe, Tuakau, Waiuku (urban, south); South Auckland (PO box, north and east)
- 22 – South Auckland (PO box, south)
- 23 – Pukekohe, Tuakau, Waiuku (PO box)
- 24 – Pokeno, Mercer, Mangatawhiri
- 25 – South Auckland (rural)
- 26 – Pukekohe, Tuakau, Waiuku (rural)
- 27 – unused
- 28 – unused
- 29 – unused
- 30 – Rotorua, Murupara
- 31 – Tauranga, Whakatane, Edgecumbe, Katikati, Kawerau, Opotiki, Te Puke, Matakana Island
- 32 – Hamilton, Raglan
- 33 – Taupo, Morrinsville, Te Aroha, Turangi
- 34 – Cambridge, Tokoroa, Mangakino, Matamata, Putaruru
- 35 – Coromandel, Ngatea, Tairua, Thames, Whitianga
- 36 – Paeroa, Waihi, Waihi Beach, Whangamata
- 37 – Huntly, Ngāruawāhia, Te Kauwhata
- 38 – Te Awamutu
- 39 – Otorohanga, Taumarunui, Te Kuiti
- 40 – Gisborne, Ruatoria
- 41 – Hastings, Napier, Wairoa
- 42 – Waipawa, Waipukurau
- 43 – New Plymouth, Eltham, Inglewood, Stratford, Waitara
- 44 – Palmerston North
- 45 – Whanganui, Patea
- 46 – Hawera, Ohakune, Opunake, Raetihi
- 47 – Feilding, Marton, Taihape
- 48 – Ashhurst, Bulls, Foxton, Shannon, Waiouru
- 49 – Dannevirke, Pahiatua, Woodville
- 50 – Lower Hutt, Upper Hutt, Kapiti, Porirua, Tawa (urban); Lower Hutt (PO Box).
- 51 – Upper Hutt (PO Box)
- 52 – Kapiti, Porirua (PO Box)
- 53 – Kapiti, Lower Hutt, Porirua, Upper Hutt (rural)
- 54 – unused
- 55 – Levin, Ōtaki
- 56 – unused
- 57 – Carterton, Featherston, Greytown, Martinborough
- 58 – Masterton
- 59 – unused
- 60 – Wellington (urban)
- 61 – Wellington (PO box, central & west)
- 62 – Wellington (PO box, south & east)
- 63 – unused
- 64 – Wellington (PO box, north)
- 65 – unused
- 66 – unused
- 67 – unused
- 68 – unused
- 69 – Wellington (rural)
- 70 – Nelson, Richmond, Brightwater, Mapua, Wakefield
- 71 – Motueka, Takaka
- 72 – Blenheim, Picton
- 73 – Cheviot, Kaikoura, Hanmer Springs
- 74 – Rangiora, Amberley, Oxford
- 75 – Akaroa, Darfield
- 76 – Kaiapoi, Leeston, Lincoln, Prebbleton, Rolleston
- 77 – Ashburton, Methven, Rakaia
- 78 – Greymouth, Hokitika, Reefton, Westport
- 79 – Timaru, Geraldine, Temuka, Twizel, Waimate
- 80 – Christchurch (urban); Chatham Islands
- 81 – Christchurch (PO Box, central)
- 82 – Christchurch (PO Box, south)
- 83 – unused
- 84 – Christchurch (PO Box, west)
- 85 – Christchurch (PO Box, north)
- 86 – Christchurch (PO Box, central-east)
- 87 – unused
- 88 – Christchurch (PO Box, north-east and south-east)
- 89 – Christchurch (rural and PO Box, rural)
- 90 – Dunedin, Mosgiel, Port Chalmers
- 91 – unused
- 92 – Balclutha, Milton
- 93 – Queenstown, Alexandra, Arrowtown, Cromwell, Ranfurly, Wanaka
- 94 – Oamaru, Palmerston
- 95 – Clinton, Lawrence, Roxburgh, Tapanui
- 96 – Nightcaps, Ohai, Otautau, Tuatapere; Fiordland, Te Anau
- 97 – Gore, Lumsden, Mataura, Winton
- 98 – Invercargill, Bluff, Edendale, Riverton, Wyndham; Stewart Island
- 99 – unused

== Examples ==
In cities and large towns, the last two digits indicate one of the four modes of delivery, as illustrated by addresses in Palmerston North:

- Street address, in which mail is delivered directly to homes by the 'postie';

43 Vogel Street
Roslyn
Palmerston North 4414

- PO Box address, in which mail is delivered to a private box, usually at a Post Shop (formerly Post Office), for collection;

PO Box 400
Palmerston North Central
Palmerston North 4440

- Private Bag, in which a private mail bag is delivered to an organisation such as a large company or a government department

Private Bag 11222
Manawatu Mail Centre
Palmerston North 4442

- Rural Delivery, used in rural areas for home deliveries.

Railway Road
RD 10
Palmerston North 4470

== Previous system ==
Although postcodes were first introduced in New Zealand in 1977, these were used entirely for pre-sorting large volumes of mail in bulk, similar to the Mailsort system used by Royal Mail in the United Kingdom. Consequently, postcodes were not usually seen in addresses:

New Zealand Post
Private Bag 39990
Wellington Mail Centre
Lower Hutt

Under the old system, Auckland, Wellington and Christchurch were divided into postal zones, which were incorporated into the postcode system for use in bulk mailings. For example, for the former Wellington 4:

Flat 2
173 Park Road
Johnsonville
Wellington 6004

In cities and large towns, the last two digits indicated the mode of delivery, as illustrated by addresses in Palmerston North:

Street address:

43 Vogel Street
Palmerston North 5301

Post Office Box address:

P O Box 4000
Palmerston North 5315

Private Bag address

Private Bag 11222
Palmerston North 5320

Rural Delivery address

Railway Road
R D 10
Palmerston North 5321

NB: Prior to the changeover, New Zealand Post also required that a space be inserted between the letters 'P' and 'O' in 'PO Box' or 'R' and 'D' in 'RD'.

== Māori names ==
New Zealand Post recognises Māori names for cities and towns in New Zealand; for example, the Māori Language Commission's address is:

Te Taura Whiri i te Reo Māori
Pouaka Poutāpeta 411
Te Whanganui a Tara 6140

In English, this translates as:

Māori Language Commission
PO Box 411
Wellington 6140

In spite of the considerable difference between the two languages, there was no need to add the postcode under the old system, which in this case would have been 6015.

== Freepost ==
Mail to members of the New Zealand Parliament is delivered free of charge for individuals (organisations must pay regular rates). The cost is deducted from the Member's budget.

Rt Hon Christopher Luxon
Prime Minister
Private Bag 18888
Parliament Buildings
Wellington 6160

Other Freepost mail includes a unique number as well as the PO Box or Private Bag number:

Freepost 112002
CARM
PO Box 913
Dunedin 9054

== See also ==
- Postal codes in Australia – the Australian equivalent
- Postal codes in Canada – the Canadian equivalent
- Postcodes in the United Kingdom – the United Kingdom equivalent
- ZIP code – the United States equivalent
