= Nixie (postal) =

Item of undeliverable mail

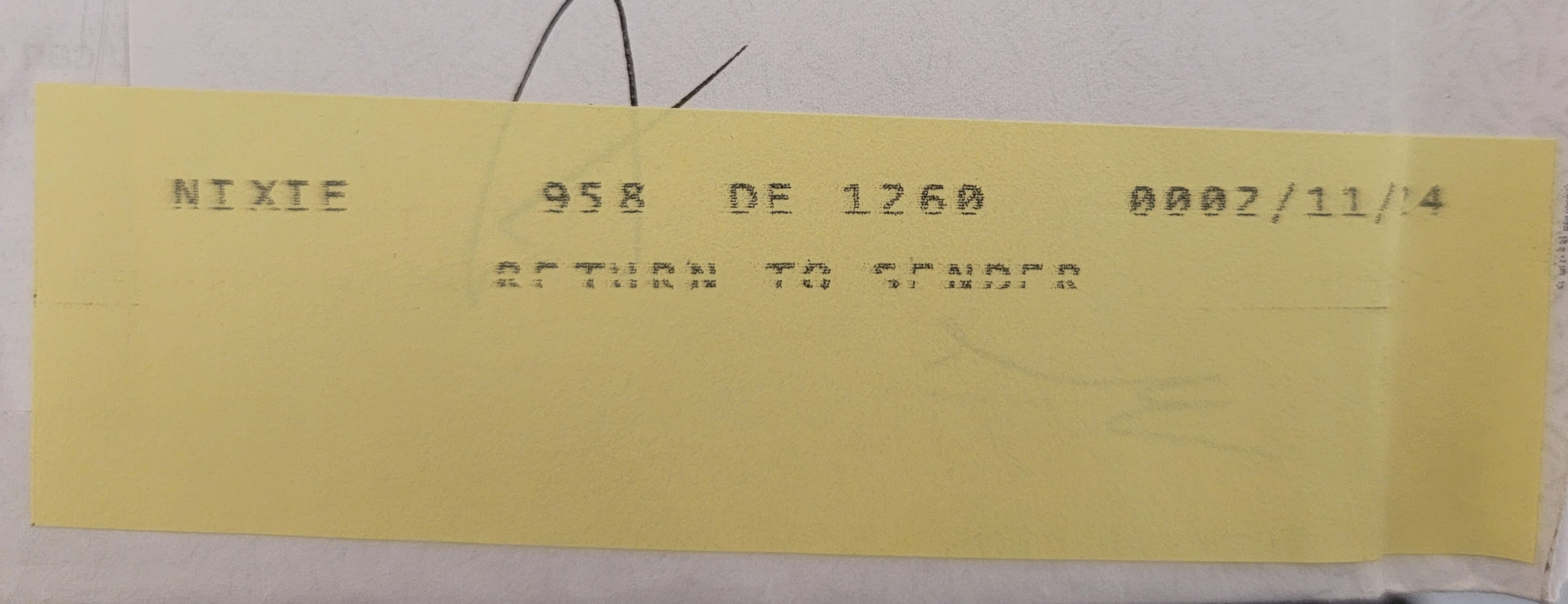
Nixie label attached to an envelope

A Nixie is a name given by the United States Postal Service to a piece of mail which is undeliverable as addressed. It is derived from "nix", English slang for the German nichts ("nothing"), and "-ie", an item or a thing. ("Nix" used in English c. 1780–1790, "Nixie" c. 1880–1885.)

In the 20th century, the term "Nixie clerk" referred to a postal employee who determined what to do with undeliverable items, which were not just poorly addressed mail, but ranged from torn-open envelopes of photographs, to lost and found wallets dropped into a mailbox. More recently, the USPS National Change Of Address (NCOA) Service provided data to mailers with scoring on how close a match the name and address are to something actually forwardable or deliverable, which were referred to as "Nixie Codes".

The USPS distinguishes a Nixie from other address errors in that the mail piece is always returned to the sender, whereas a change of address could either be forwarded or returned to the sender with a correction or notification. In the early 21st century the word began to be printed in the upper left corner of yellow labels generated by the USPS's Postal Automated Redirection System (PARS).

== See also ==
- Dead letter mail
