= NCOA =

NCOA may refer to:

- National Change Of Address database (see United States Postal Service)
- National Chamber Orchestra of Armenia
- National Council on Aging
- The Noncomissioned Officer Academy in the United States Air Force
