= Return address (disambiguation) =

A return address on a piece of mail identifies where to return it to if it cannot be sent to the address.

The term may also refer to:

- Bounce address, a similar feature on email
- The memory address a return statement hands control of a computer program to
