= Commercial mail receiving agency =

Mail delivery designation

In the United States, a commercial mail receiving agency (CMRA) is a private business that accepts mail from the Postal Service on behalf of third parties. A CMRA may also be colloquially known as a mail drop. A mailbox at a CMRA is called a private mailbox (PMB).

A customer of a CMRA can receive mail and other deliveries at the street address of the CMRA rather than the customer's own street address. Depending on the agreement between the customer and the CMRA, the CMRA can forward the mail to the customer or hold it for pickup.

Unlike a post office box, a CMRA operates independently of the national postal administration and is therefore able to receive courier packages or other items which are not traditional mailpieces. CMRAs typically provide ancillary services such as facsimile, copy, packaging, or courier.

A customer may wish to use the services of a CMRA for privacy. A customer in one community may contract with a CMRA in another community with a better known or more prestigious address. A business located near an international border may use a CMRA as a point of local presence to receive cross-border freight or correspondence at domestic (instead of international) rates.

A traditional advantage of a CMRA over a Post Office box was that customers could use the CMRA's street address plus a suite number as the address of their private mailbox. This masked the fact that the private mailbox was not the customer's actual residence or business address. However, Web mapping services with aerial photography allow anyone to determine that a particular street address is occupied by a shopping center and not an office building, while Google Street View allows anyone to see that a particular street address is occupied by a CMRA retail storefront and not an office.

The use of a CMRA may result in mail delivery occurring at a later time of day than it would at a Post Office box. Some CMRAs offer a virtual mailbox, or online post office, providing a means to access mail over the internet. The USPS will not process a change of address from an address at a CMRA.

== History ==
In 1970, there were estimated to be as many as 1,500 CMRAs, costing on average $7 per month for a small mailbox. The private mailbox business grew as a result of shortage of P.O. Boxes.

As of 2000, the USPS regulated 466 private mailboxes in New York City alone.

== Use as a business address ==
Most business entities are required to register an official mailing address with the state, and that address is part of the public record. A business's use of an invalid address or an inappropriate third party as its official mailing address could result in legal problems, such as the loss of limited liability protection. If a business does not want to disclose its physical location, it may permissibly use a CMRA as its publicly known address.

== Relevant regulations ==
Any person or entity claiming to receive postal mail for a third-party must be properly licensed and registered with the US Postal Service, and such an entity must properly fill out USPS Form 1583. There are specific requirements all CMRA's must adhere to, including granting certain rights to CMRA customers.

== Examples ==
- Mail Boxes Etc.
- PostNet (company)
- The UPS Store

== See also ==
- Virtual office
- Customs broker
- Freight forwarder
- Post office box
- Private mail bag
- Virtual mailbox
