= Virtual mailbox =

Service to receive physical mail for someone

A virtual mailbox is a service that receives physical mail on behalf of the addressee and usually scans the outside of the mail. Some providers also scan the inside contents of the mail as well. These scans may be photos, PDFs, or text-searchable PDFs. Reasons for using virtual mailboxes may include accepting mail from couriers, accessing mail while traveling, and keeping a home address private.

== Virtual mailbox and P.O. boxes ==
Virtual mailboxes are different from P.O. boxes, which some delivery services will not deliver to, because they tend to offer a real street address and additional services. Services offered may include: mail forwarding, scanning, check depositing, and recycling. In the United States, virtual mailbox providers are classified as commercial mail receiving agencies (CMRA). Almost every popular virtual mailbox service provides customers with both a web version and a mobile application.

== Legality ==
In the United States, virtual mailbox providers are classified as commercial mail receiving agencies (CMRA). Commercial mail receiving agencies are allowed to receive, access, and open third-party mail only when someone completes a USPS 1583 and has it notarized.

Once this form is complete, a virtual mailbox address can be used as the official business mailing address in most states.

== See also ==
- Digital nomad
- Poste restante
- Mail forwarding
