= Drop shipping =

Supply chain management method

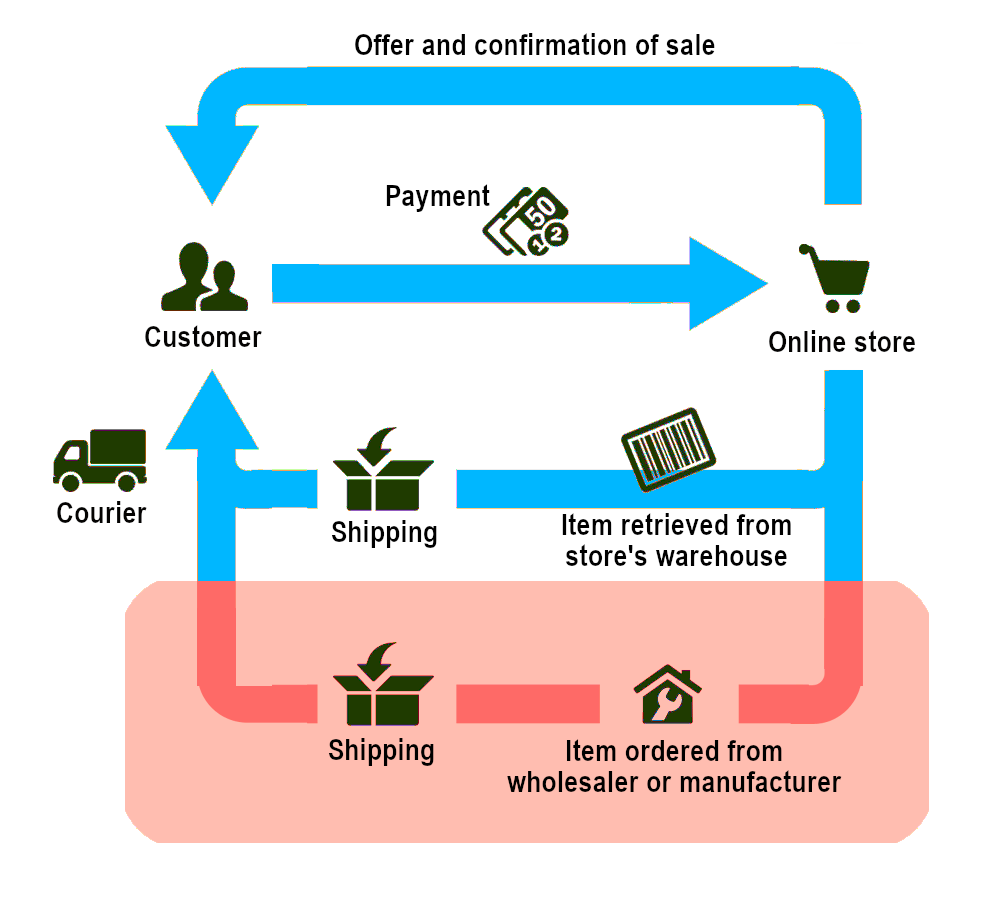
When an item is drop-shipped, it is dispatched from a wholesaler rather than the seller's own stock

Drop shipping is a form of retail business in which the seller accepts customer orders without keeping stock on hand. Instead, the seller transfers the orders and their shipment details either to the manufacturer, a wholesaler, another retailer, or a fulfillment house, which then ships the goods directly to the customer.

The seller is responsible for marketing and selling the product, but has limited control over product quality, storage, inventory management, or shipping. It avoids the costs of maintaining warehouses or even a storefront, purchasing and storing inventory, and employing necessary staff for such functions.

Drop shipping has become a popular business model as it requires minimal initial investment and overhead costs. A drop shipping operation can be managed from any location with an internet connection. However, drop shipping also has its drawbacks, including lower profit margins, less control over the quality of the products sold and an increased risk of shipping delays or supply chain issues.

Amazon, the online shopping giant, found early success with a drop shipping business model where they could offer over a million different books to consumers while only keeping approximately 2,000 of the more popular titles in stock. Publishers and wholesalers would receive forwarded orders from Amazon and would ship the products directly to the customer using packaging from Amazon.

== Procedure ==
A drop shipping business to consumer model does not require a brick and mortar store, which may be forgone entirely or combined with a drop shipped order fulfillment business model. A physical retailer may keep potential drop shipped items on display, provide details on mail order items via a catalogue, or maintain a website with information available only online. A virtual retailer only has a website.

Drop shipping retailers are not required to disclose the practice, nor, as with any other retailer, the wholesale source of the products they offer. This can be achieved by "blind shipping" (shipping merchandise without a return address corresponding to the seller), "private label shipping" (having merchandise shipped from the wholesaler with a return address customised to the retailer), or utilising a fulfillment house. The ultimate order fulfiller might also include a customised packing slip, including details such as the retailer's company name, logo, and contact information.

Sellers on online auction sites such as eBay also use drop shipping as way of distributing products without stocking the items sold. A seller will list an item as new, and have purchased items shipped directly from the wholesaler to the customer. The seller's profit is the difference the price the customer paid and the price the seller paid from the wholesaler, minus any pertinent selling, merchant, or shipping fees accruing to them. However, some of the drop shipping methods used by sellers are not allowed under the eBay terms of service. This includes drop shipping methods in which a seller fulfills an order by purchasing the item from another online marketplace and then has the item shipped to the customer. Sellers who use this method can be suspended from eBay.

Products may be listed by a drop shipping retailer as available but actually be back-ordered either with the wholesaler or the item's manufacturer. Such potential delays in order fulfilment are not always known, or if known disclosed, by a seller. Likewise, order fulfilment and shipping delays are beyond the seller's control, yet can reflect badly on the purchaser's ultimate satisfaction.

== Economics ==
The economics of dropshipping can be complex and depends on a number of different factors such as cost of goods, handling and shipping fees, marketing and advertising expenses, profit margins and scale or efficiency.

Cost of goods is important as the markup from the wholesale price is the dropshipper's profit margin. Dropshippers do not physically handle their products, thus shipping and handling fees can vary depending on supplier and customer location. Suppliers may charge a flat rate or percentage of sales price impacting profit margins of the dropshipper. Furthermore, in order to attract customers, dropshippers invest in marketing and advertising campaigns such as social media ads, influencer partnerships and search engine optimization.

== In China ==
With the increasing relevancy of drop shipping, this business model has become increasingly popular with the rise of e-commerce platforms and the ease of global trade, particularly from China. China is globally recognised as a manufacturing powerhouse, producing a vast array of products at competitive prices. Through establishing a partnership with Chinese suppliers, drop shippers can offer a wide range of products without the need to invest in inventory. In addition, China has extensive access to global markets which enables to drop shippers to continually expand their investments. China provides a well-established shipping and logistics infrastructure, and enables efficient and cost-effective transportation of goods to customers worldwide, providing a crucial component for the success of the drop shipping model, as timely and reliable shipping is a key factor in customer satisfaction.

China's relation with the drop shipping business model is already well established with e-commerce platforms such as Alibaba and AliExpress having facilitated the growth of drop shipping by providing marketplaces for suppliers and drop shippers to connect. Subsequently, with these platforms continually expanding, China has experienced exponential economic growth, leading to increased disposable income for its citizens. Moreover, internet penetration and smartphone adoption have also increased quite drastically. The combination of these factors have manifested an extensive domestic platform for e-commerce, supplying greater opportunities for drop shipping businesses to expand.

The Chinese government has established the significance of e-commerce and cross-border trade for the country's economic development. Subsequently, the Chinese government has created policies, initiatives, and regulations to aid and promote the market platform of e-commerce. Such an example is the government establishment of special economic zones and tax incentives to encourage e-commerce and export-specific industries.

== Scams ==
Drop shipping has been a popular component of internet-based work-at-home schemes posted on social networking services. Scammers will promote drop-shipping as a work-at-home scheme, in which victims will be sold a list of businesses from which drop shipment orders can be placed. These businesses may not be wholesalers, but other businesses or individuals acting as middlemen between retailers and wholesalers, with no product of their own to sell. These middlemen often charge prices that leave little profit margin for the victim and require a regular fee for use of their services. In 2019, the Gimlet Media podcast Reply All investigated the drop-shipping phenomenon, exploring the way drop shippers microtarget their client, but also found that micro-shipping itself is a rather dubious industry in that, despite the promises of some of the most well-known drop-shipping proponents, few drop shippers actually make any profits.

In 2016, BuzzFeed News published an article exposing unscrupulous drop-shippers in China, describing how customers were receiving products that were not those which were advertised, or did not receive any products at all.

One effect of drop-shipping scams is that customers who receive a drop-shipped package may realise that they overpaid for the item, return the item to the seller, and then reorder the identical item directly from the manufacturer. The cost of processing the return and the loss of the unsold returned product can result in significant losses to the drop shipper.

== See also ==
- Fulfillment house
- Logistics
- Mail forwarding
- Mail order
- Order fulfillment
- Will call
