= PCoA =

PCOA or PCoA may refer to:

- Plasmid-encoded copper resistance determinant, an Escherichia coli operon responsible for copper homeostasis
- Police Civilian Oversight Authority, a Jamaican body entitled to monitor the Police Forces
- Posterior communicating artery, a pair of blood vessels in the circle of Willis
- Principal coordinates analysis (or classical multidimensional scaling), a statistical method used to explore similarities in data set
  - Principal component analysis (abbreviated usually as PCA), a related mathematical procedure of data conversion into linearly uncorrelated variables
- Proprietary Change of Address, a type of service offered by commercial providers that supplement National Change Of Address database
