= Dead letter mail =

Mail that cannot be delivered or returned to sender

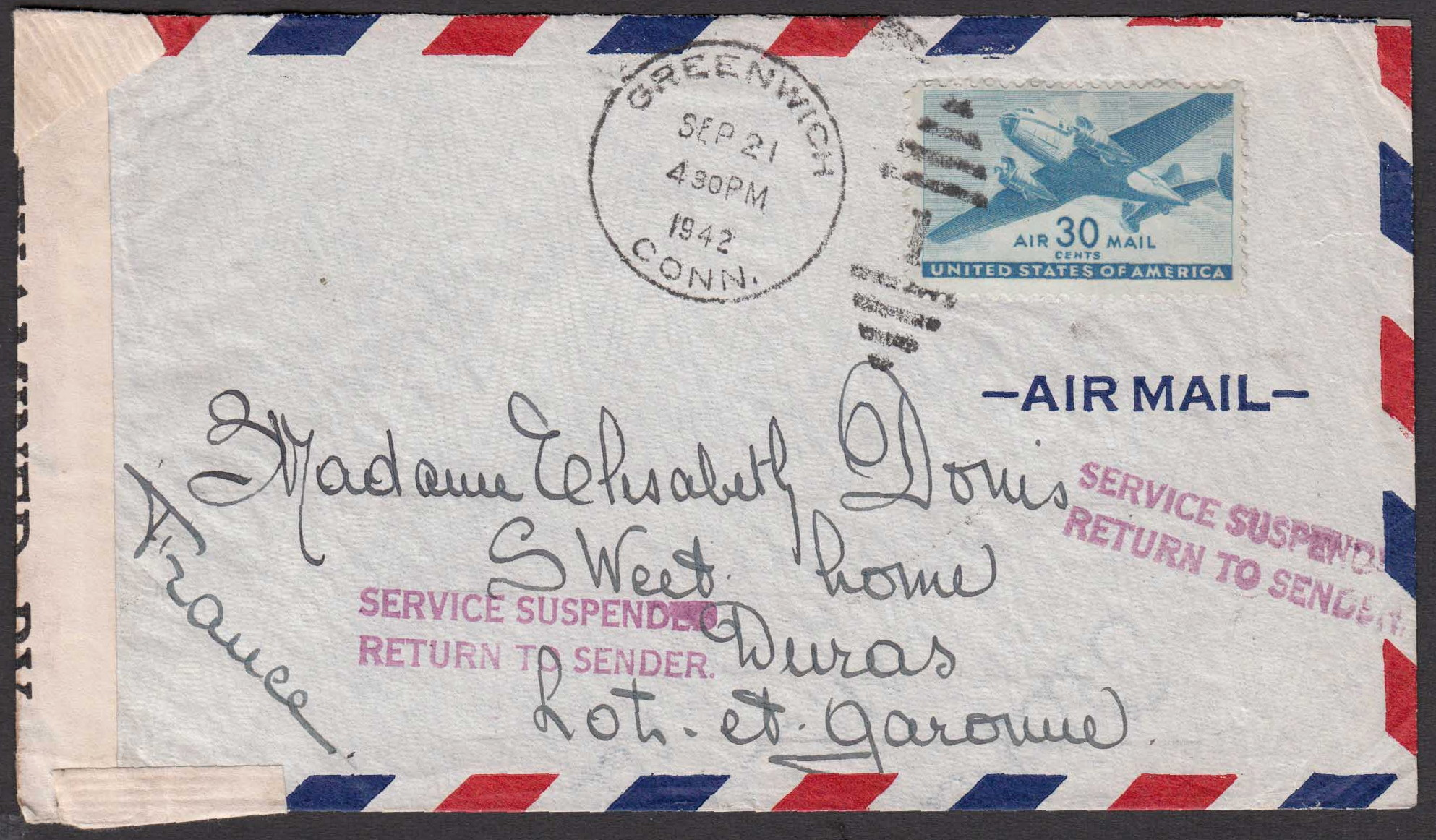
Returned censored airmail cover from Greenwich, Connecticut, United States, to Duras, Lot-et-Garonne, France stamped 24 September 1942

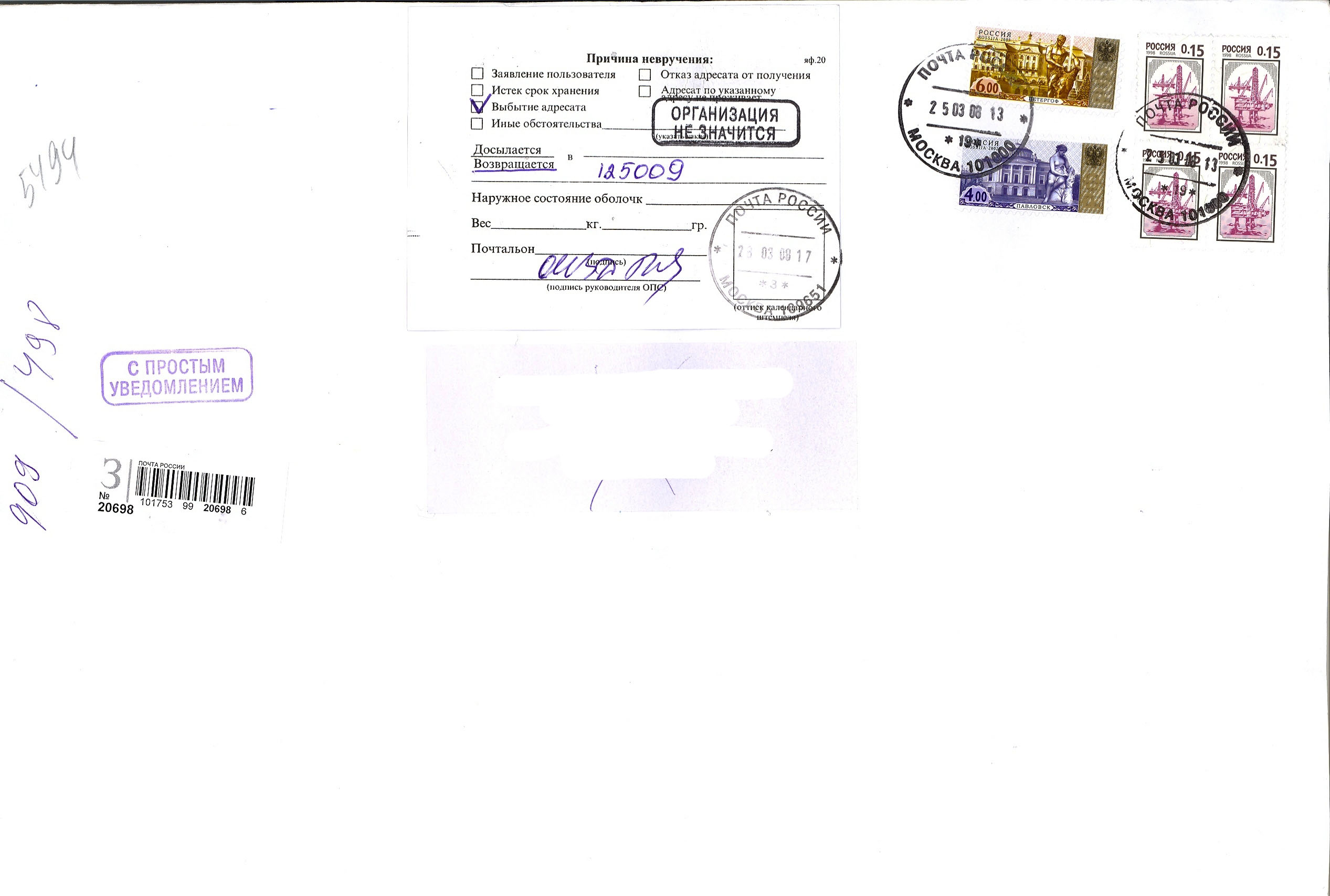
2008 Russian letter with affixed return label and reason for return checked

Dead letter mail or undeliverable mail is mail that cannot be delivered to the addressee or returned to the sender. This is usually due to lack of compliance with postal regulations, an incomplete address and return address, or the inability to forward the mail when both correspondents move before the letter can be delivered. Largely based on the British model that emerged in the late eighteenth century, many countries developed similar systems for processing undeliverable mail.

The term "dead mail" is perhaps a misnomer, and several jurisdictions have opted for the use of the term "undeliverable mail" as more clearly representing the status of the item whose transmission has been impeded. As it is performed by internal departments within postal administrations, little information about the dead letter office function has ever been made public. A few journal articles and at least one recently published book (Canadian) dealing with this topic have appeared.

Classification as a dead letter is one of the few instances where postal personnel are allowed to violate secrecy of correspondence, ostensibly to search for clues as to the letter's origin or destination. Countries must also set up regulations for the disposal of dead letters, particularly when they contain items of value. Some very valuable items have turned up in undeliverable mail, including a stolen painting by Marc Chagall which turned up in a United States Postal Service sorting center in Topeka, Kansas in January 2002.

Many countries, including Canada and the United States, have issued special labels for envelopes that have travelled through the dead letter office. Genuinely used examples are highly prized by collectors, although mint labels, because they have no postage value, are often fairly common.

== Dead letter office ==
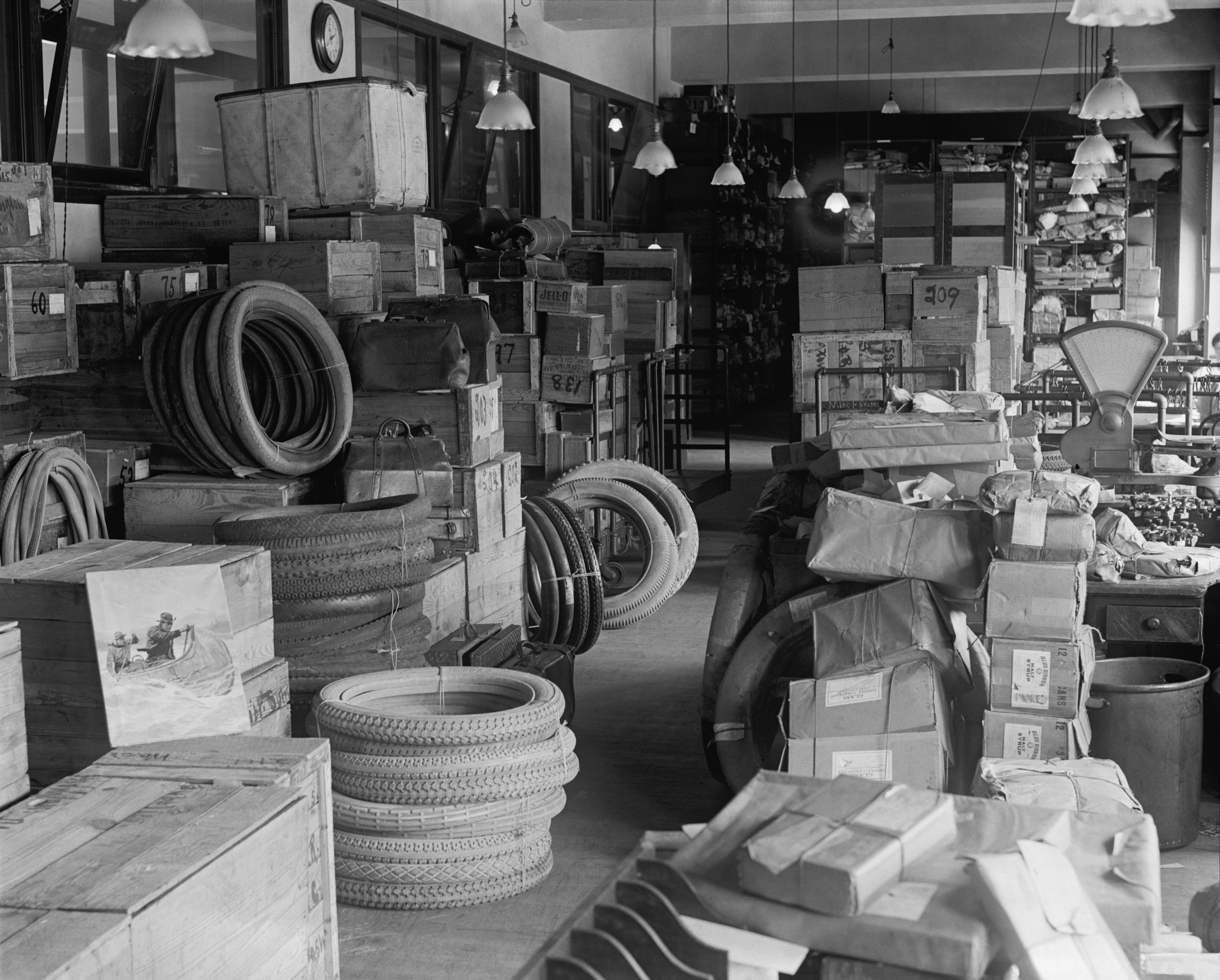
Dead letter office, probably in Washington, D.C.; September 1922

A dead letter office (DLO) is a facility within a postal system where undeliverable mail is processed. Mail is considered to be undeliverable when the address is invalid so it cannot be delivered to the addressee, and there is no return address so it cannot be returned to the sender.

At a DLO, mail is usually opened to try to find an address to forward to. If an address is found, the envelope is usually sealed using tape or postal seals, or enclosed in plastic bags and delivered. If the letter or parcel is still undeliverable, valuable items are then auctioned off while the correspondence is usually destroyed. Despite this practice, in the past some undeliverable envelopes were acquired by philatelists.

Dead letter offices go by different names in different countries. In many English-speaking countries they are called returned letter offices.

=== Canada ===
Canada Post sends mail which is not deliverable to the Undeliverable Mail Office (NUMO) at Mississauga, Ontario, or North Sydney, Nova Scotia. Domestic mail which is still undeliverable after passing through NUMO is then destroyed, while incoming international undeliverable mail is returned to the country of origin.

=== Malta ===
In Malta, undeliverable mail was sorted in the General Post Office in Valletta. The facility was initially known as the Returned Letter Branch, but later on it was also referred to as the Returned Letter Office or Dead Letter Office. Various postal markings were used at the facility from 1889 onward.

=== United Kingdom ===
A Dead Letter Office was first established in 1784 for dead and missent letters that had reached London. The bye-letter offices dealt with bye-letters and those that did not go to London. No postage was charged for returns, which were made after six months, where an addressee was found. From 1790, a charge was made for returned letters but the time was reduced to two months by John Palmer. Upon hearing of the return charge William Pitt rescinded the charge.

In the UK, undeliverable mail is processed in the National Returns Centre in Belfast which holds 20 million undeliverable items, or in a smaller office in Portsmouth.

=== United States ===
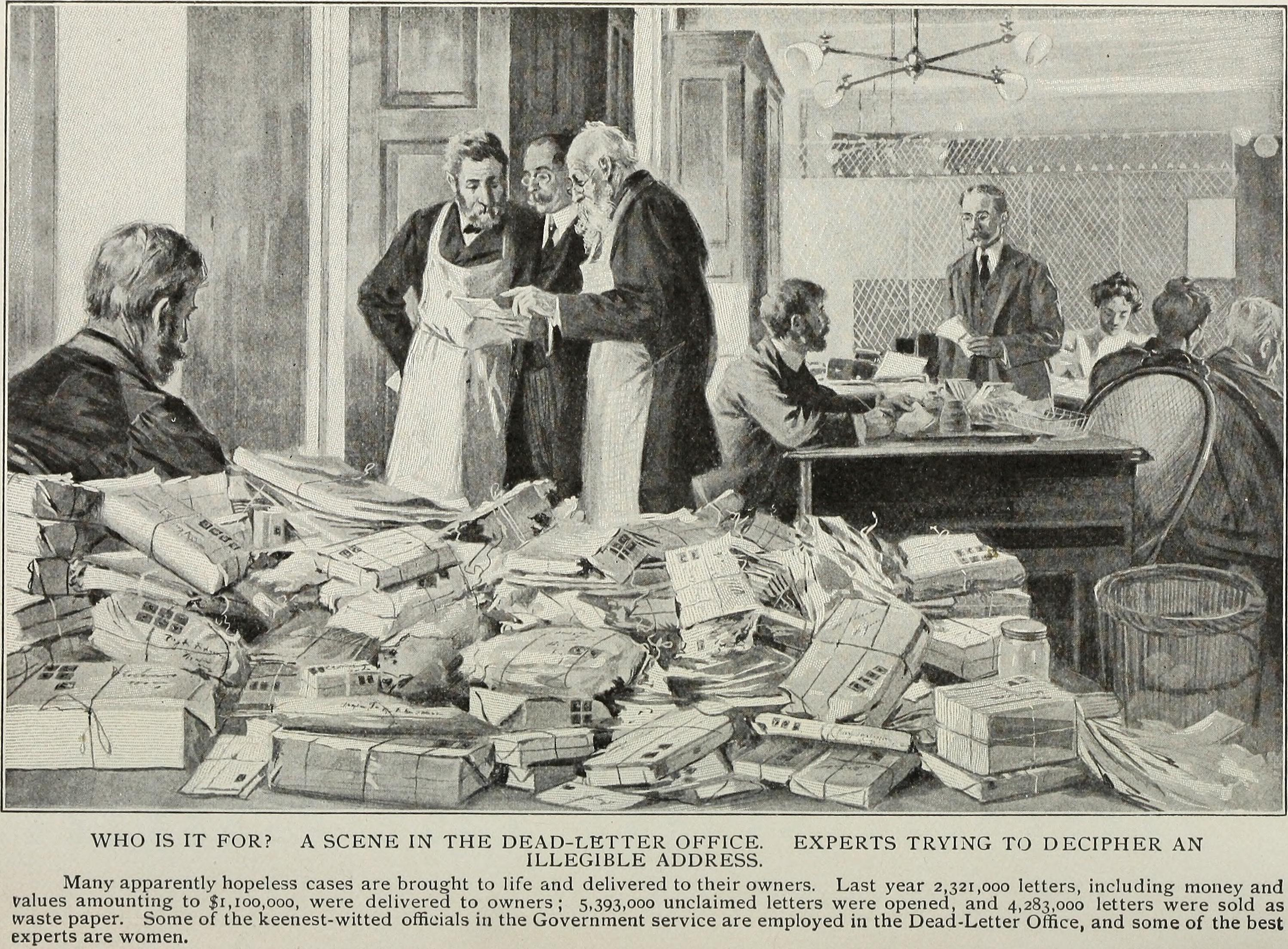
1901 illustration of the Washington Dead Letter Office

The U.S. Post Office, as it was known then, started a dead letter office in 1825 to deal with undeliverable mail. By 1893, it handled about 20,000 items every day. Patti Lyle Collins was a long-time employee of the office, responsible for the redirection of an estimated 1,000 letters a day. In 2006, approximately 90 million undeliverable-as-addressed (UAA) items ended up in the dead-letter office of the U.S. Postal Service; when the rightful owners cannot be identified, the correspondence is destroyed to protect customer privacy, and enclosed items of value are removed.

These facilities are now known as mail recovery centers (MRC). Other former names include the dead letter branch and the dead parcel branch. The USPS mail recovery center is located in Atlanta, Georgia. Since April 2013, the postal auctions have been held online and include not only material lost in the U.S. but also material from other national postal authorities who consign them to the USPS for auction.

=== In popular culture ===
- The first full-length American detective novel, The Dead Letter, is partially set in the Dead Letter Office in Washington, D.C. The book was written by Metta Victoria Fuller Victor under the pseudonym Seeley Regester in 1866.
- The rock band R.E.M. released a compilation of B-sides and rarities in 1987 entitled Dead Letter Office.
- At the conclusion of Herman Melville's short story "Bartleby, the Scrivener," the narrator learns that the titular character had worked in the Washington, D.C. Dead Letter Office and ponders whether the act of destroying undelivered letters drove Bartleby to a mental break.
- In the 1947 film Miracle on 34th Street, two mail sorters handle a letter addressed to "Kris Kringle" at the New York City courthouse, and decide to deliver all the Santa Claus mail now in the dead letter office to the courthouse, where a man calling himself Kris Kringle is facing a mental competency hearing. The man's attorney uses the huge volume of mail as evidence that the federal government recognizes his client as "the one-and-only Santa Claus".
- Horror writer Clive Barker's book The Great and Secret Show features segments centered on the dead letter office in Omaha, Nebraska.
- In 1993, the USPS issued a 29c Elvis Presley stamp. Many fans of Elvis sent letters to fictitious addresses so that they would receive their letters back, marked with the words "return to sender", a homage to the song "Return to Sender".
- In the 1996 comedy film Dear God, a character played by Greg Kinnear, who works in the dead letter office in Los Angeles, California, responds to letters written to God.
- The 2014 television series Signed, Sealed, Delivered takes place in a fictional dead letter office in Denver, Colorado.
- The level in the 2021 videogame Psychonauts 2 titled "Cruller's Correspondence" is an abstract representation of an old-fashioned post office, which includes both a "Dead Letter Office" and an "International Dead Letter Office".
- The 1998 feature film Dead Letter Office is based around the unrequited love and unfulfilled dreams of characters at an Australian DLO.
- In the 2019 video game Control, the fictional government agency called the Federal Bureau of Control has a department called "Dead Letters", where they receive correspondence from across the country that may hint at a supernatural situation.
- In the 2025 video game Dead Letter Dept., the player's task is to transcribe scans of undeliverable mail.

== See also ==
- Nixie (postal)
