= Will call =

Merchandise delivery method

Will call refers to a method of delivery for purchased items where the customer picks up the items at the seller's place of business, primarily in United States commerce. It may also refer to the department within a business where goods are staged for customer pick up.

The word "call" is a shortened form of "call for", which means "to come and get", so "will call" literally means "(the customer) will call for (come and get) the goods." In a linguistic process similar to initial-stress derived nominalization, the first syllable of the noun phrase is usually stressed ("will call") rather than the second syllable in the verb phrase ("will call").

The term is most commonly used in relation to admission tickets for events.

== North America ==
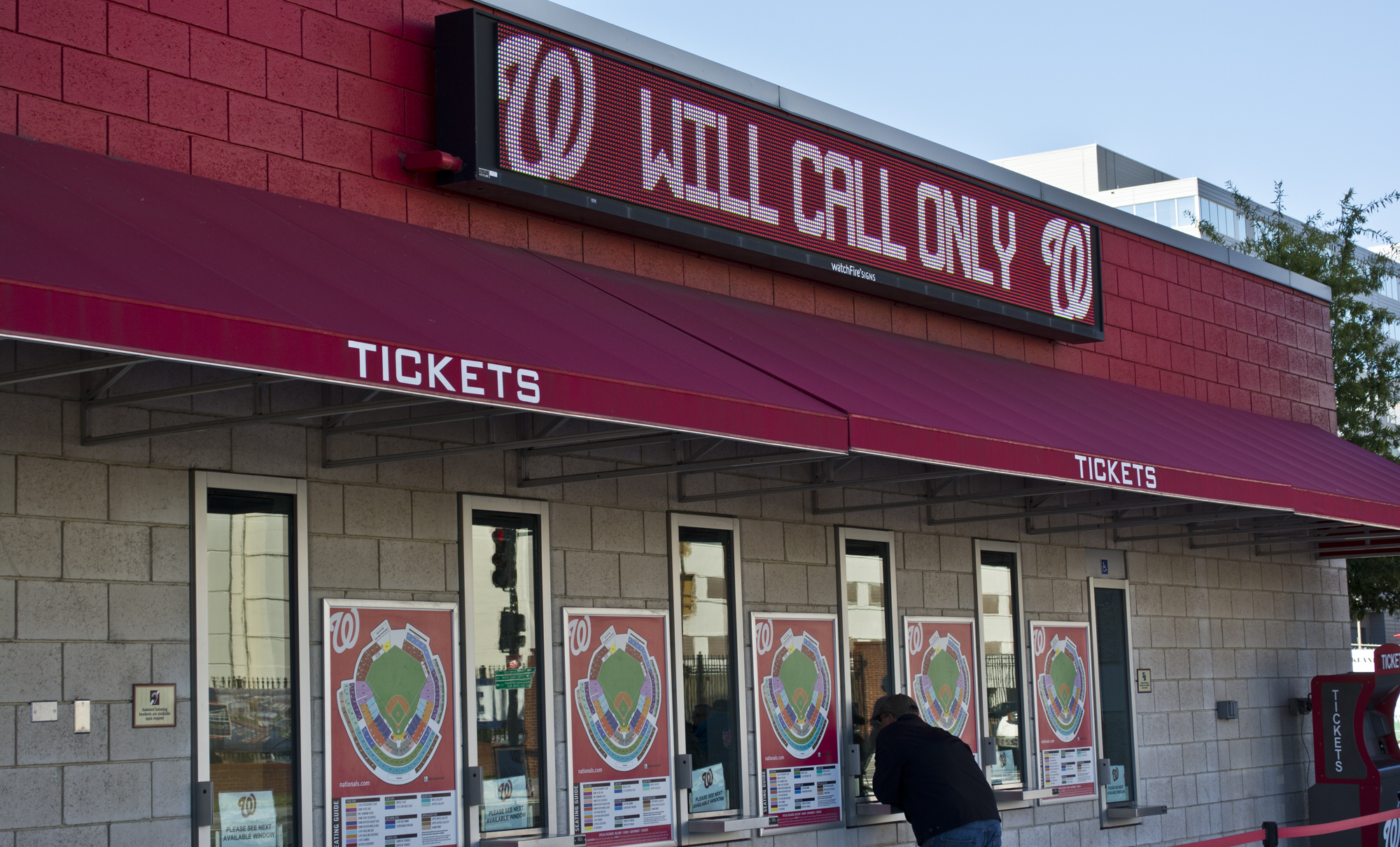
A will call ticket line in Nationals Park

As of 2022, Will Call is still in wide use for ticket sales at a box office where patrons of entertainment venues go to pick up pre-purchased tickets for an event, such as a play, sporting event, museums, or concerts, either just before the event or in advance. At large venues such as stadiums or theme parks, "Will Call" pickup windows may be designated specifically for this purpose.

In the wholesale and retail trade industry, a will call memo is given to wholesale delivery drivers as an instruction to pick up items at the address stated on the memo.

== Great Britain ==
Normally in the UK the term used is "at the door" or "on the door"; such as "tickets can be collected at the door". The acronym COBO, for "Care of Box Office", is used internally by ticket offices and not common with the public. A similar term "buyer collects" is used on online auction sites, to imply that the customer must collect the goods from the vendor after sale, usually implying that they will not post. For goods purchased remotely and collected by the buyer, the usual term used is click and collect.

== See also ==
- FOB (shipping)
- Incoterms (Ex works)
- Drop shipping
- General Delivery/poste restante
