= Package forwarding =

Package forwarding, also called parcel forwarding, is an international shipping service offered by shipping companies to international online shoppers who want to do cross-border online shopping. Package forwarding is becoming more and more popular among international shoppers because of the high growth rate of e-commerce websites and shipping limitations of most such websites. Package forwarding service is provided by package forwarders to make cross-border shopping convenient and easy, getting rid of the problems in payment and shipping. A package forwarding service is different from mail forwarding. Mail forwarding refers to the mail in traditional meaning, or magazines or papers that are normally called mail, while package forwarding refers to online purchases or orders that are shipped within a bag or a box.

== Reasons ==
There are several reasons that caused package forwarding service into existence:

1. Fast development of online e-commerce shopping.
2. The convenient of international checkout with PayPal and others.
3. Possibility of shopping from Amazon and eBay from areas where these companies don't ship.
4. The needs of shoppers in one country that desire to buy from online retailers from another country.
5. Transit safety, quality check, package return and insurance features provided by some providers.
6. The price differences between domestic stores and international stores.
7. Communication issues caused by language barriers between shoppers and retailers.

There are several challenges associated with cross-border online shopping from, including shipping and payment for orders. For instance, US online stores are popular worldwide, but some of them only ship to US addresses or their international shipping rates are prohibitive. US package forwarding services help international shoppers with shipping their purchases from the US to their home address or help them place a direct order with the US retailers if they do not have a US billing address. Since 2010, this US model has been emulated internationally, including in France, with many companies in various countries now offering very similar services to overseas buyers.

The customer usually has the option to instruct the forwarding company on how, when, and where to ship their package, as well as which transport provider to use.

== Procedure ==
A package forwarding service typically operates in five steps:

1. The shopper first obtains a local shipping address from the package forwarder, usually the company's warehouse address.
2. The shopper then places an online order and uses the given shipping address along with a reference number to distinguish the package from others.
3. The package forwarder receives the package and consolidates it with other orders if needed.
4. Shoppers pay the package forwarder for both its services and the international shipping fee.
5. The package forwarder ships the package, and the shopper receives it.

== See also ==
- Freight forwarder
- Mail forwarding
- Daigou
