= Patti Lyle Collins =

Writer and United States Postal Service worker

- Born: Martha Louisa Lyles

Patti Lyle Collins (died December 23, 1913) was an American civil servant known for exceptional skill in her work to determine the intended destination of mail with inscrutable, incorrect, or bizarrely incomplete addresses — a task performed by the Dead Letter Office of the United States Post Office Department. According to an 1893 profile of Collins in The Saturday Evening Post, "she reads the riddles of the post office" as "unquestionably the most highly skilled expert" in the field.

== Early and personal life ==
Collins was born into a wealthy family of Alabama around 1840, the only child of William Durham and Mary (née Bibb) Lyles. She was drawn to foreign languages from an early age and was afforded education and travel programs to support her studies in multilingualism. In 1866 she married N. D. Collins, a lawyer from Memphis, Tennessee. After they had three children, his death made Patti Collins a widow and occurred along with the death of her father, forcing Collins to provide for her children as well as her mother.

== Career ==
Patti Lyle Collins led an initial career as a writer and writing instructor before her historic tenure at the Post Office Department. As an employee, she earned multiple promotions, first to assistant translator and eventually to head of the Dead Letter Office in Washington, D.C., a central operation to direct mail with incomprehensible addresses. Many such addresses were written with highly unusual formatting, nonstandard phonetics, and in dialects of non-English tongues, likely sent by uneducated or immigrant customers. Collins' familiarity with French, German, Greek, Arabic, and general history helped her see a mail sender's mental process from their mangled writing. Eventually, she developed in-depth knowledge of street names and numbering across the entire United States.

Collins processed about 1000 letters per day and reported that the Dead Letter Office handled about six million pieces of mail annually.

=== Expertise ===
Collins could identify "Quincy Steep" as a phonetic misspelling of "Coenties Slip" (a street in Manhattan pronounced somewhat similarly) and "Lazy Jane" as La Cygne, Kansas. She understood the one-word address "Island" to likely mean Wheeling, West Virginia (nicknamed "The Island" by locals). Collins' instincts regarding surname popularity by state informed her correct guess to send mail to Stockbridge, Massachusetts based on the unfinished address: "Miss Isabel Marbury, Stock". Collins could often decipher strings of text such as "Giuvani Cirelili, Presidente Sterite, Catimoa". In this instance, "Presidente Sterite" refers to President Street, and she knew that "President Street" did not exist in any U.S. city at the time but Baltimore. Therefore the mail went to Baltimore, where local records allowed for delivery using the recipient's name.

Address as written	Address "translated" by Collins
Nu. Pot Nus Vodzinie.	Newport News, Virginia.
Abram Waistein, Pedison Yasi Pscheik Streit No. 23.	Paterson, Jersey, No. 23 Passaic Street.
Signore Antonio Paradise, Cella 96, New Yarck Toopeso.	Cell No. 96, Tombs, New York.
Li J. Merricks, Box 40, innamerica.	Merricks, P. O. Box 40, Long Island City.

Collins died in Washington, D.C., on December 23, 1913.

== Publications ==
- "What Children Ask of Santa Claus". The Ladies' Home Journal. 16 (1). December 1898.
- "Why Six Million Letters Go Astray Every Year". The Ladies' Home Journal. 16 (10): 4. September 1899.
