= PostNet (company) =

American business services company

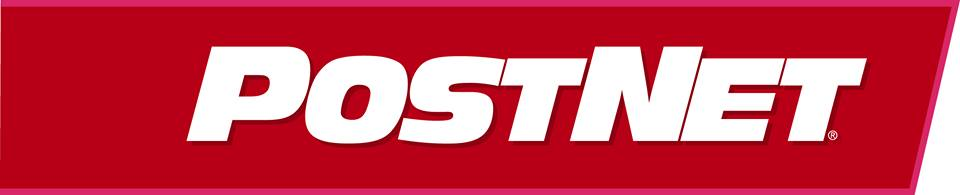
- Type: Private
- Industry: Business Services, Retail, Franchising
- Founded: 1992
- Founders: Steve Greenbaum and Brian Spindel
- Headquarters: Lakewood, Colorado, USA
- Key people: Paolo Fiorelli (CEO), Ryan Farris (President/COO)
- Products: Printing, Graphic Design, Shipping, Copying, Private Mailbox
- Owner: Mail Boxes Etc.
- Number of employees: 25
- Website: postnet.com

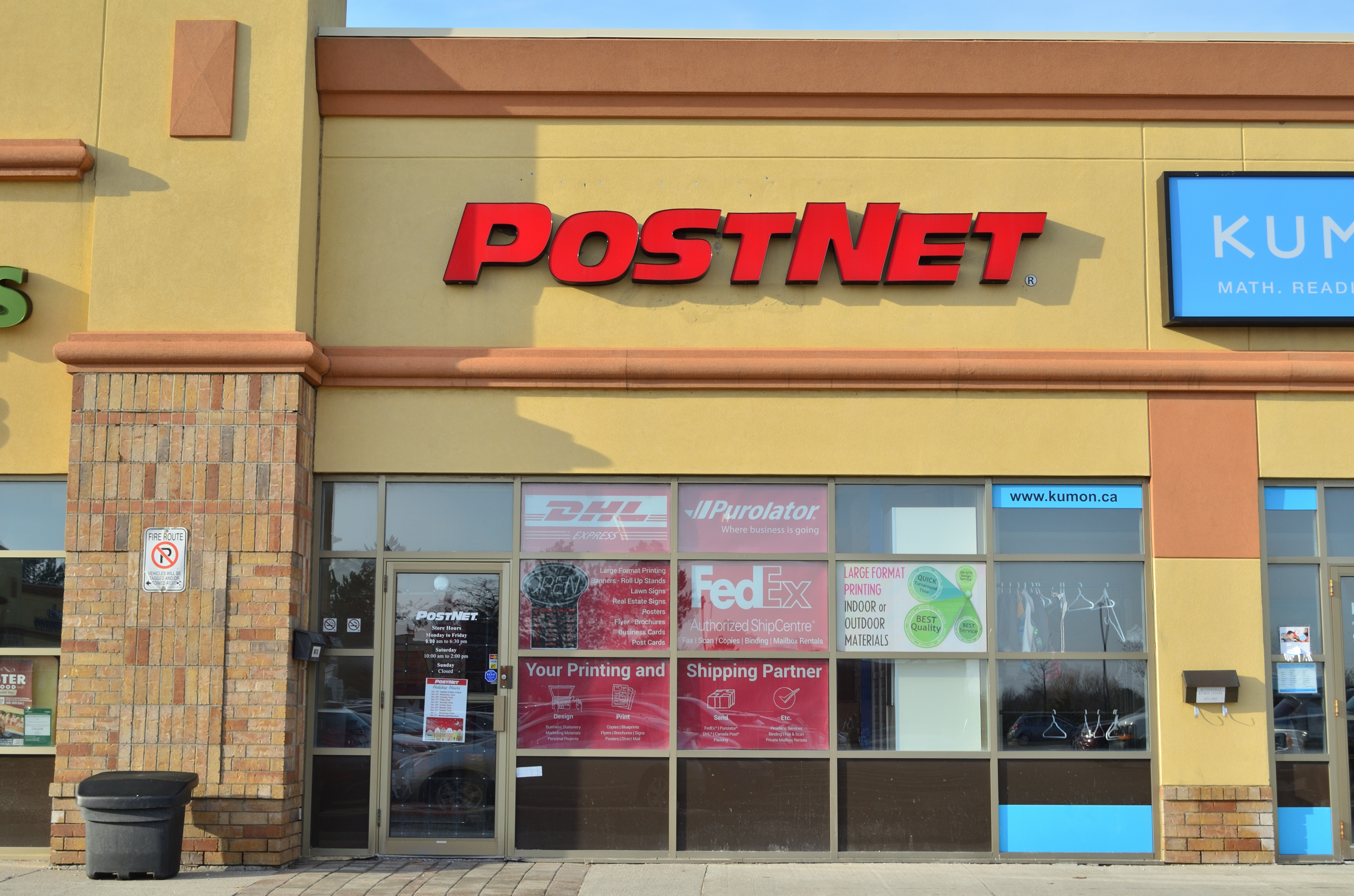
PostNet store

PostNet International is the franchisor of PostNet centers, which provide graphic design and printing services for businesses and consumers. In addition, PostNet centers offer professional packing services and shipping with UPS, FedEx, DHL and the U.S. Postal Service, as well as private mailbox rental, direct mail services and more.

Since the company was founded in 1992, PostNet has grown to 660 locations in 9 countries.

== History ==
PostNet was founded in Las Vegas, Nevada, in 1992 by Steve Greenbaum and Brian Spindel, and originally had Norma A. Knudsen as its COO. The company began franchising in 1993. In 2017, PostNet became part of the global family of MBE International. Combined, the two organizations have nearly 2,300 locations in 33 countries.

PostNet markets itself to marginalized investors, targeting minorities, for investment. While owned by the same holding company as AlphaGraphics, it is common knowledge within the corporate office that minority candidates may be better able to qualify for a PostNet franchise than an AlphaGraphics. [citation needed]
