= China Manufacture License =

China Manufacture License (CML/TS License/SELO certificate) refers to the practitioners licensing and authority of using the TS marking for the special equipment.

The companies who engage the manufacture (include: construction, making, installation, alteration, maintenance, etc.), use and inspection of the special equipment must be inspected and approved by General Administration of Quality Supervision, Inspection and Quarantine of the People's Republic of China (AQSIQ), then can obtain the license and producing or selling the applied equipment in China. As the Executive organization, Special Equipment Licensing Office (SELO) of State Administration for Market Regulation (SAMR) (formerly known as Special Equipment Licensing Office of General Administration of Quality Supervision, Inspection and Quarantine, P.R.C.) was established on July 16, 2003, with the approval of AQSIQ.

Special equipment covers: boilers, pressure vessels, pressure pipelines, elevators, cranes, passenger ropeways, large amusement devices, and non-road vehicles.
