= Private mail bag =

A private mail bag (PMB), locked bag or caller service is a term for a special form of postal delivery in some countries, usually a government department or large private company, which receive large volumes of mail. Private mail bag addresses are often used in countries in Africa where there may be no street delivery service.

== Examples and variants ==
Like PO Box addresses, private mail bag addresses omit the name of the building and street, and include only the number allocated to the user.

Ford Motor Company of Australia Limited
Private Mail Bag 6
Campbellfield Vic 3061
Australia

In some cases, a private mail bag may not have a number:

University of Sierra Leone
Private Mail Bag
Freetown
Sierra Leone

It differs from PO box delivery in that whereas the holder of a PO box has to go to the post office in order to collect mail, the mail sent to a private bag is dispatched to the holder by a mail contractor.

=== Private bag ===
In other countries, particularly South Africa, New Zealand and Fiji, the term private bag is used.

University of Auckland
Private Bag 92019
Auckland 1142

In Fiji the usage is similar to New Zealand

FSC Limited
Private Mail Bag,
Lautoka
Fiji

In South Africa, the private bag number may also contain letters.

Department of Home Affairs
Private Bag X114
Pretoria 0001

=== Locked bag and caller service ===
In Australia, there are also locked bag addresses:

Special Broadcasting Service
Locked Bag 028
Crows Nest NSW 1585

In Singapore, the term locked bag service is used:

Singapore Press Holdings Limited
Robinson Road Post Office
Locked Bag Service 10
Singapore 908186

These are similar to a private mail bag, but the holder must collect the mail at the post office, like a PO box.

In the United States, this service is called caller service. However, mail to a caller number is, with limited exceptions, addressed as though the caller number were a physical PO box, as seen in the following example:

Commissioner for Patents
PO Box 1450
Alexandria VA 22313-1450

== See also ==
- Commercial mail receiving agency, providers of private mail boxes
- Post office box
