= Post office box =

Rented mailbox at a post office

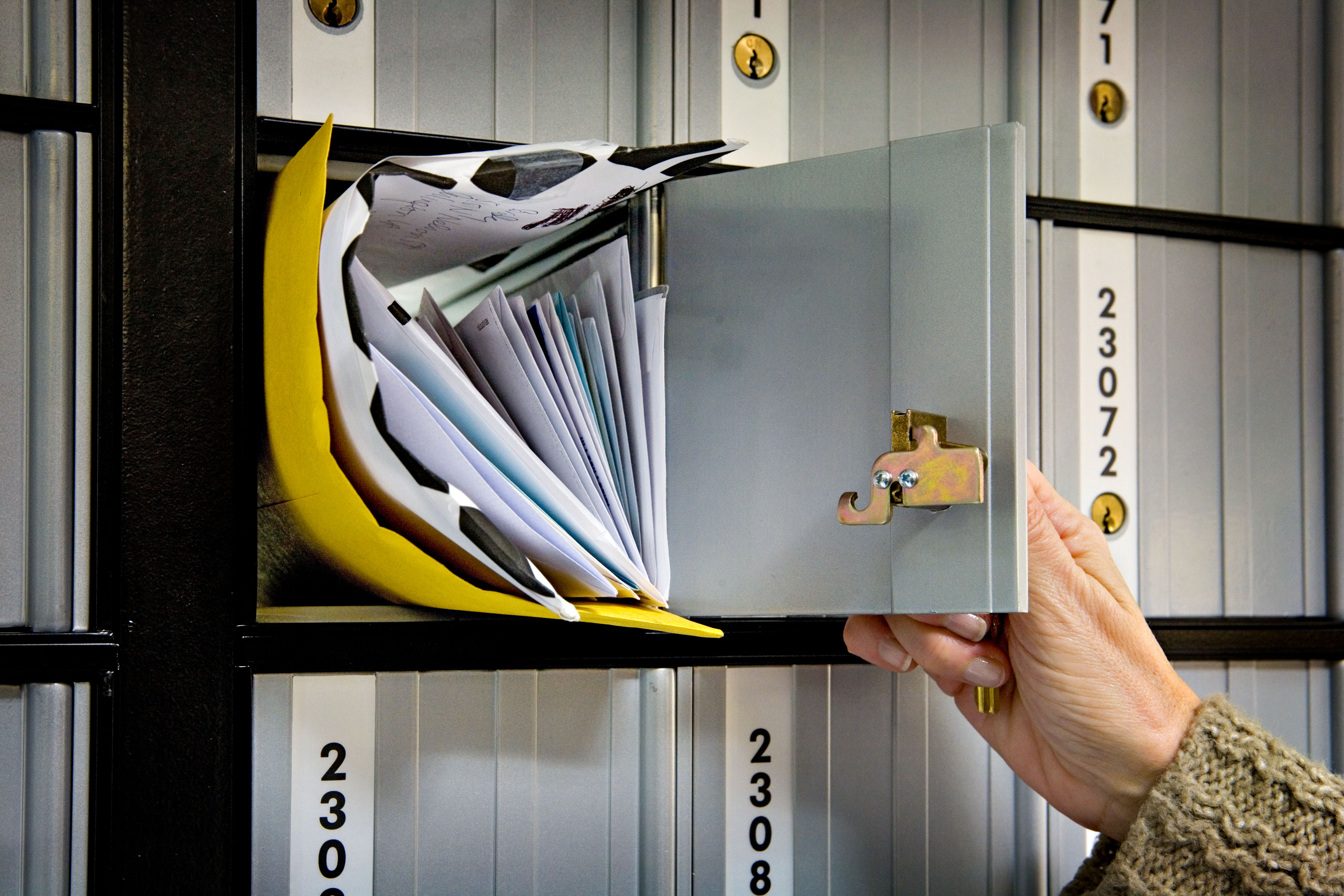
An American post office box full of mail

A post office box (commonly abbreviated as P.O. box, or also known as a postal box) is a uniquely addressable lockable box located on the premises of a post office.

In some regions, particularly in Africa, there is no door-to-door delivery of mail; for example, in Kenya. Consequently, renting a PO box has traditionally been the only way to receive mail in such countries.

Generally, post office boxes are rented from the post office either by individuals or by businesses on a basis ranging from monthly to annual, and the cost of rent varies depending on the box size. Central business district (CBD) PO boxes are usually more expensive than rural PO boxes.

== Location ==
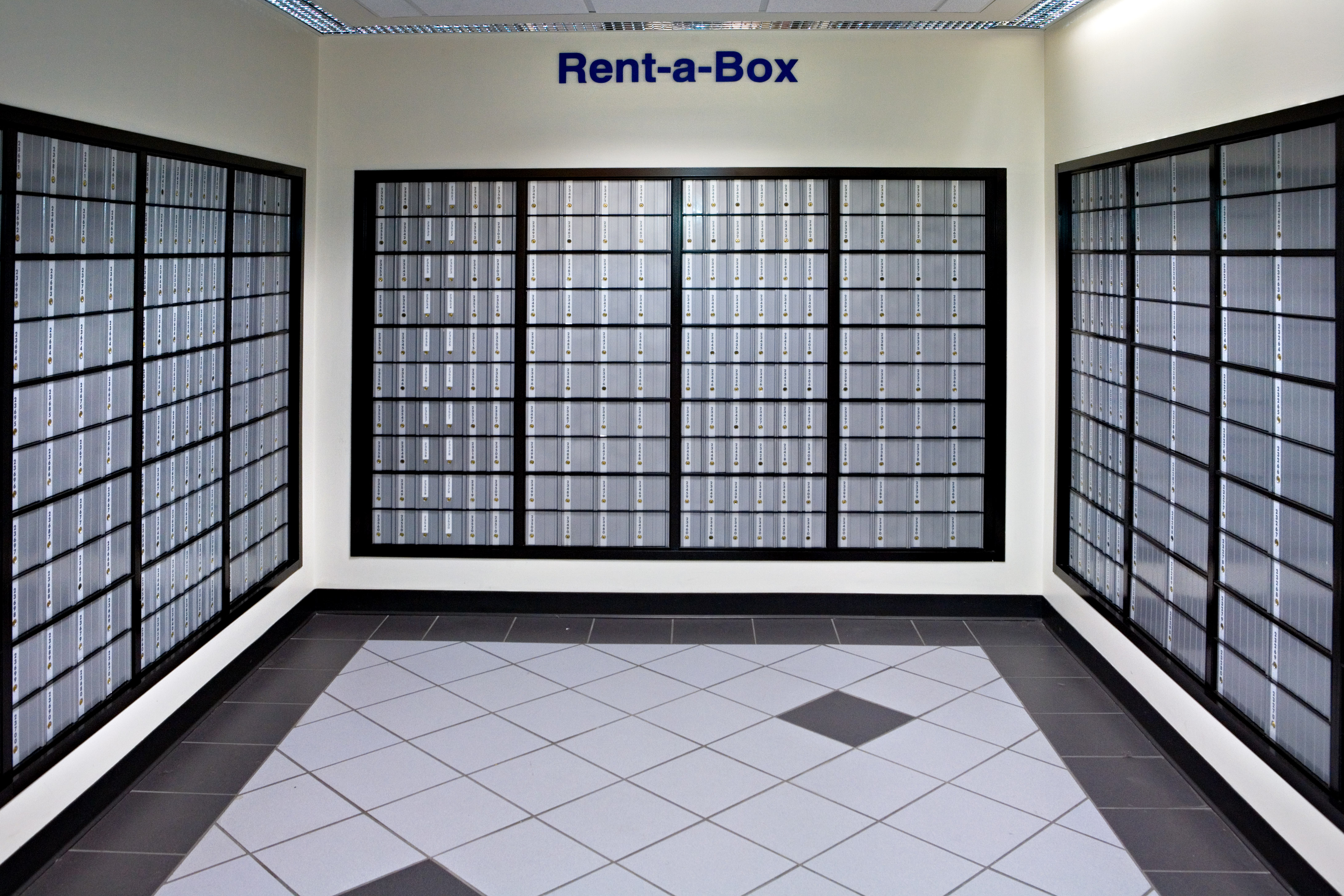
PO boxes in the lobby of a U.S. post office

Post office boxes are usually mounted in a wall of the post office, either an external wall or a wall in a lobby, so that staff on the inside may deposit mail in a box, while a key holder (some older post office boxes use a combination dial instead of a key) in the lobby or on the outside of the building may open their box to retrieve the mail.

In many post offices in the United States, the PO box lobby is separate from the window-service lobby, so that the former may be kept open for longer hours or around the clock, while the latter is locked after business hours. In the U.S. since the 1980s, in cities and large urban areas, post offices have tended to close box lobbies overnight because of the tendency of homeless people to use them for sleeping quarters. As a result, some box lobbies are accessible after hours by customers who are provided a code to a door keypad. In addition, some post offices are located in rented facilities, such as shopping malls. As a result, PO boxes can be accessed only while that facility is open.

== Packages ==
If a parcel does not fit in a PO box, the postmaster will leave a note advising that customer to pick up that parcel from the counter. In some post offices, a key will be left in the PO box that corresponds to a larger, locked box (parcel locker) where the patron may pick up their package if a signature is not required. Most often, in this case, once the key is used to open the larger, locked box, the key cannot be removed again by the patron, but the door cannot be secured either. Notes will also be left in the PO box in respect of cash on delivery (COD) and registered mail that has to be signed for.

In 2011, the United States Postal Service (USPS) began a pilot program with a computerized parcel locker kiosk system, called "gopost" which installed larger boxes to handle package pickup from an unstaffed station. A given box can be used by multiple customers thanks to the integration of a computer which accepts a delivery code.

Until 2012, package delivery to USPS post office boxes was not available from private carriers like UPS, FedEx and others. In early 2012, the USPS introduced a P.O. Box Street Address (PBSA) service that allows box-holders to combine the street address of the post office where their box is located with their post office box number into a street address format. A mailing industry publication called the new service "a great service for people who already have a PO Box and don't want their packages delivered to their home."

== Locked bags and caller service ==
Users receiving very large quantities of mail can use "locked bags", which are numbered like PO boxes. In the United States, this service is called caller service, and the assigned number is called a caller number, although mail is typically addressed to "PO Box (caller number)."

== Security ==
Each country has its own rules and regulations as to how one can retrieve mail at a PO Box. Some countries, such as the United States or the United Kingdom, may require one or more forms of identification. Not all countries offer locked PO Boxes.

In the United States, two forms of identification are required when signing up for a PO Box; one of which must be a photo ID.

== By continent ==
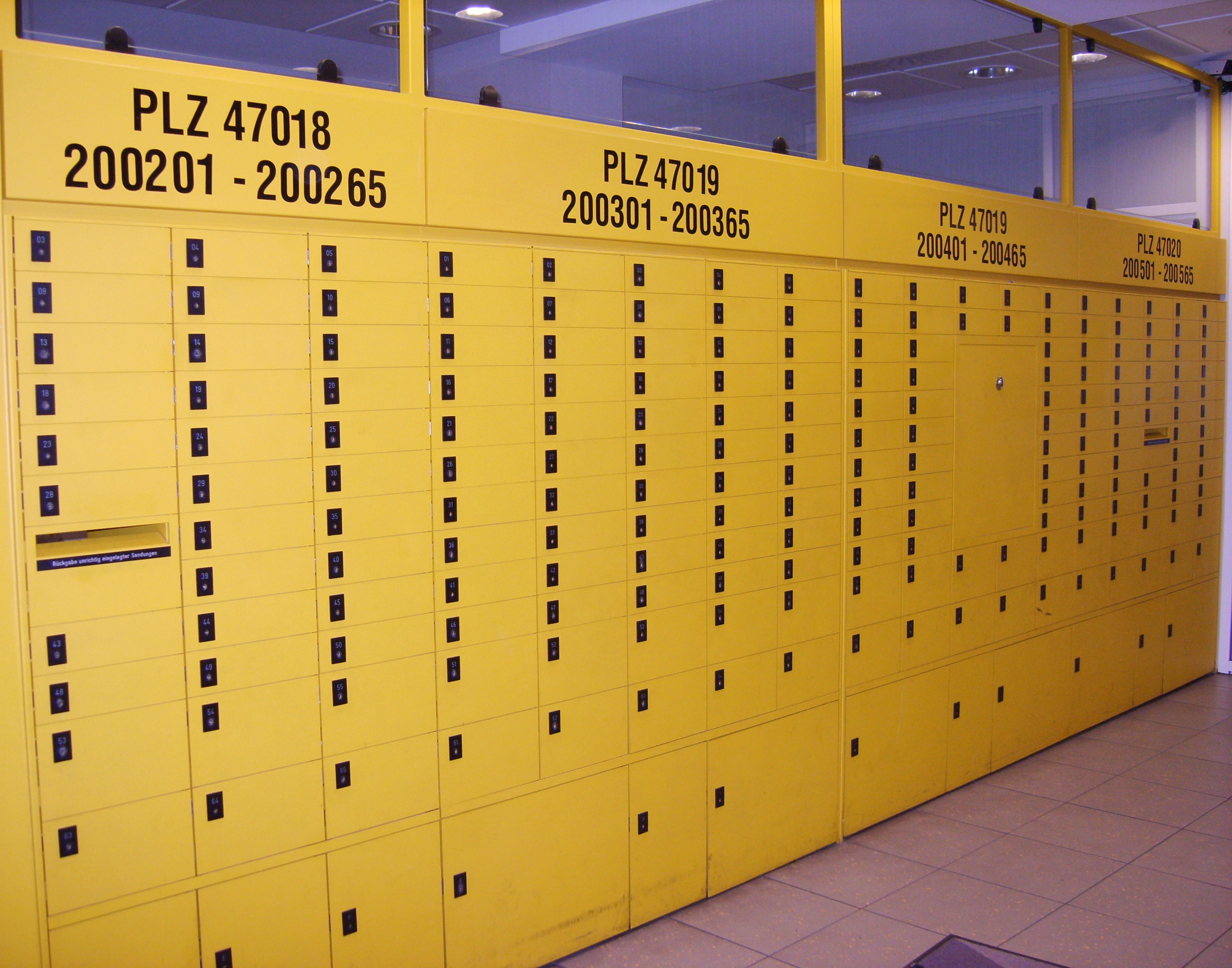
PO boxes of various sizes in a German post office, with their number range and postcodes written above them

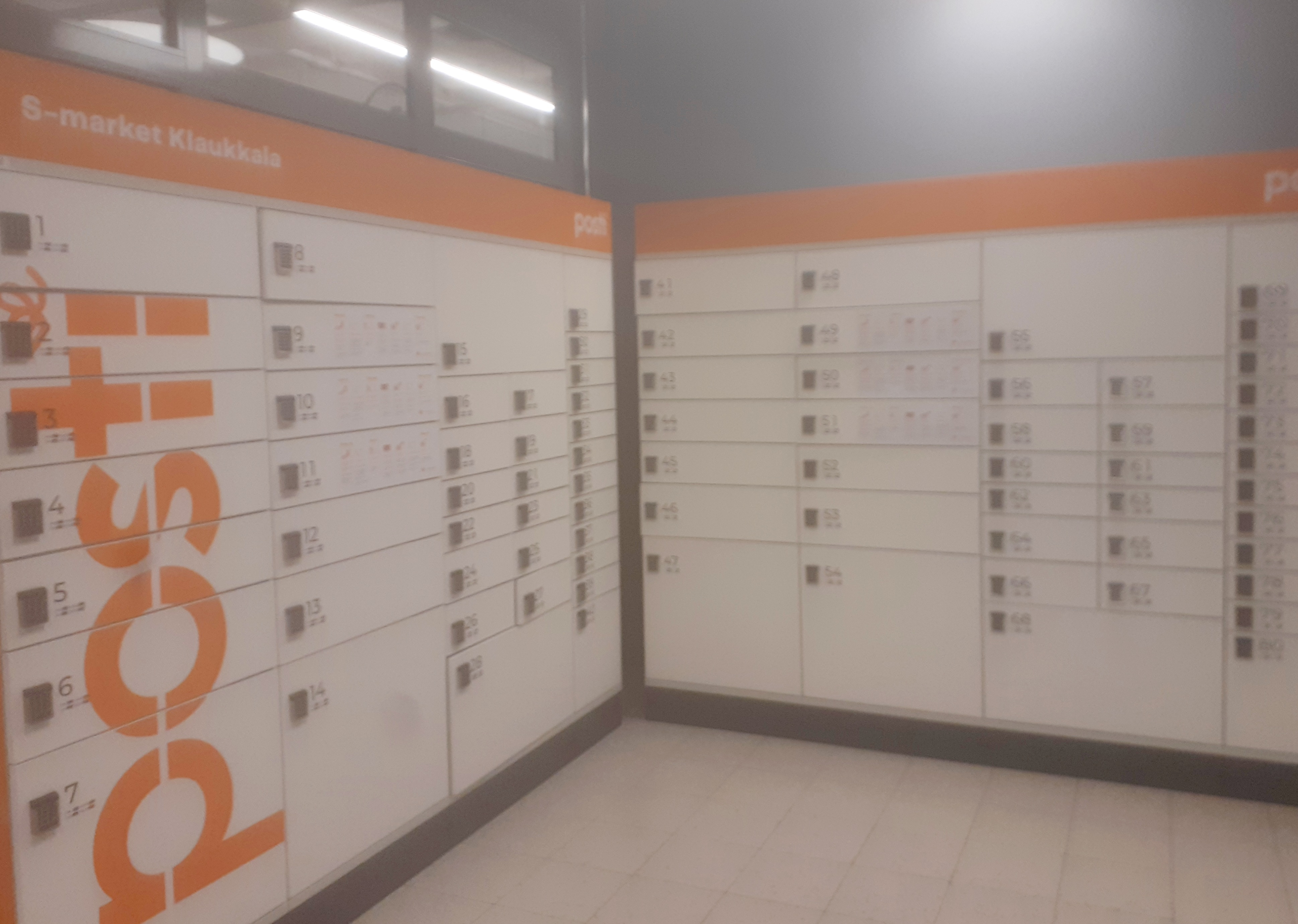
Post office boxes next to the S-market supermarket in Klaukkala, Finland

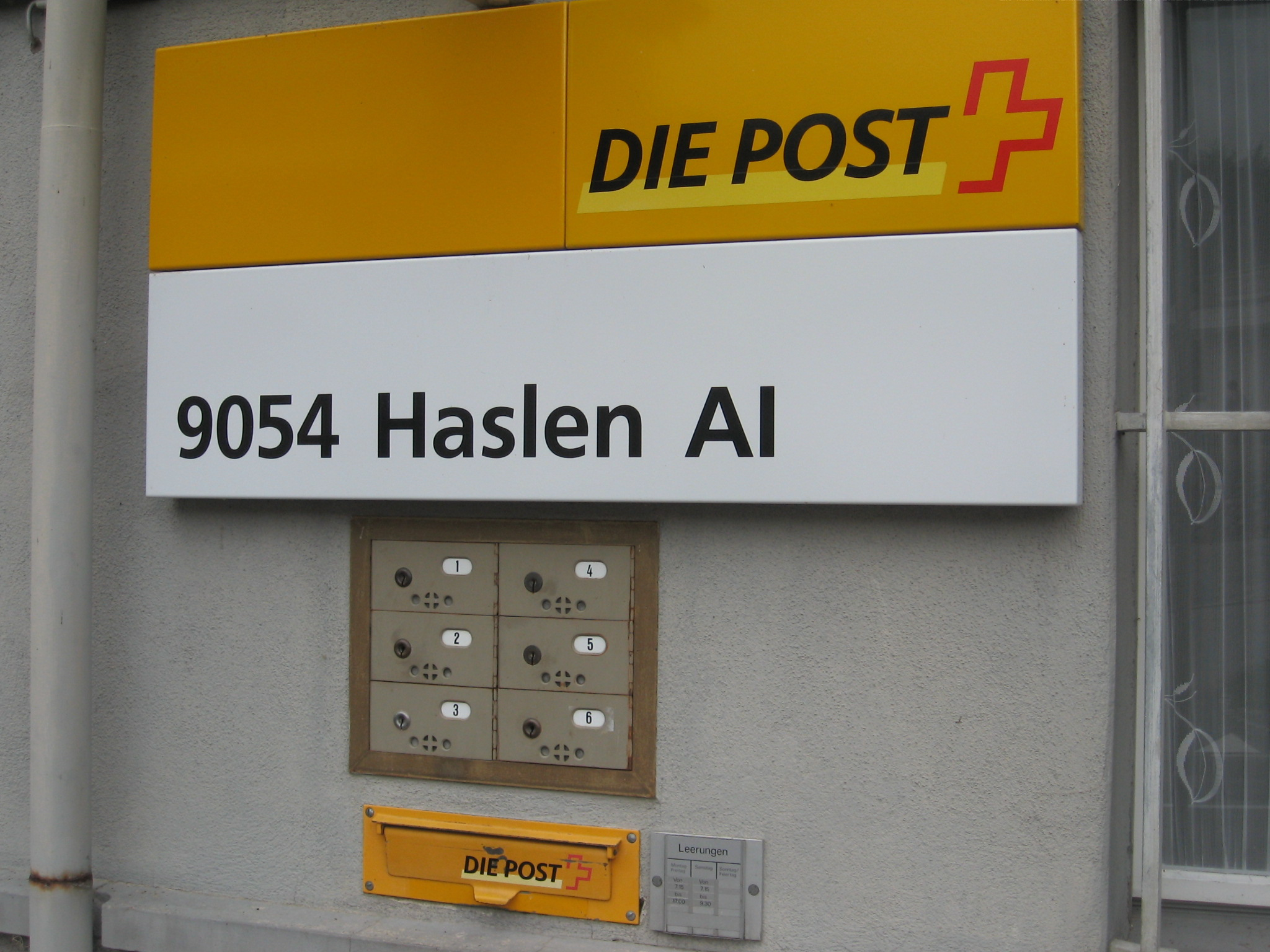
Outdoor Post Office Boxes (as common in Switzerland) numbers one to six at 9054 Haslen, Switzerland

Many countries offer some type of PO Boxes for different uses. There are an increasing number of private companies that provide similar PO Box services to the official postal service privately under the guise of mail forwarding.

=== Africa ===
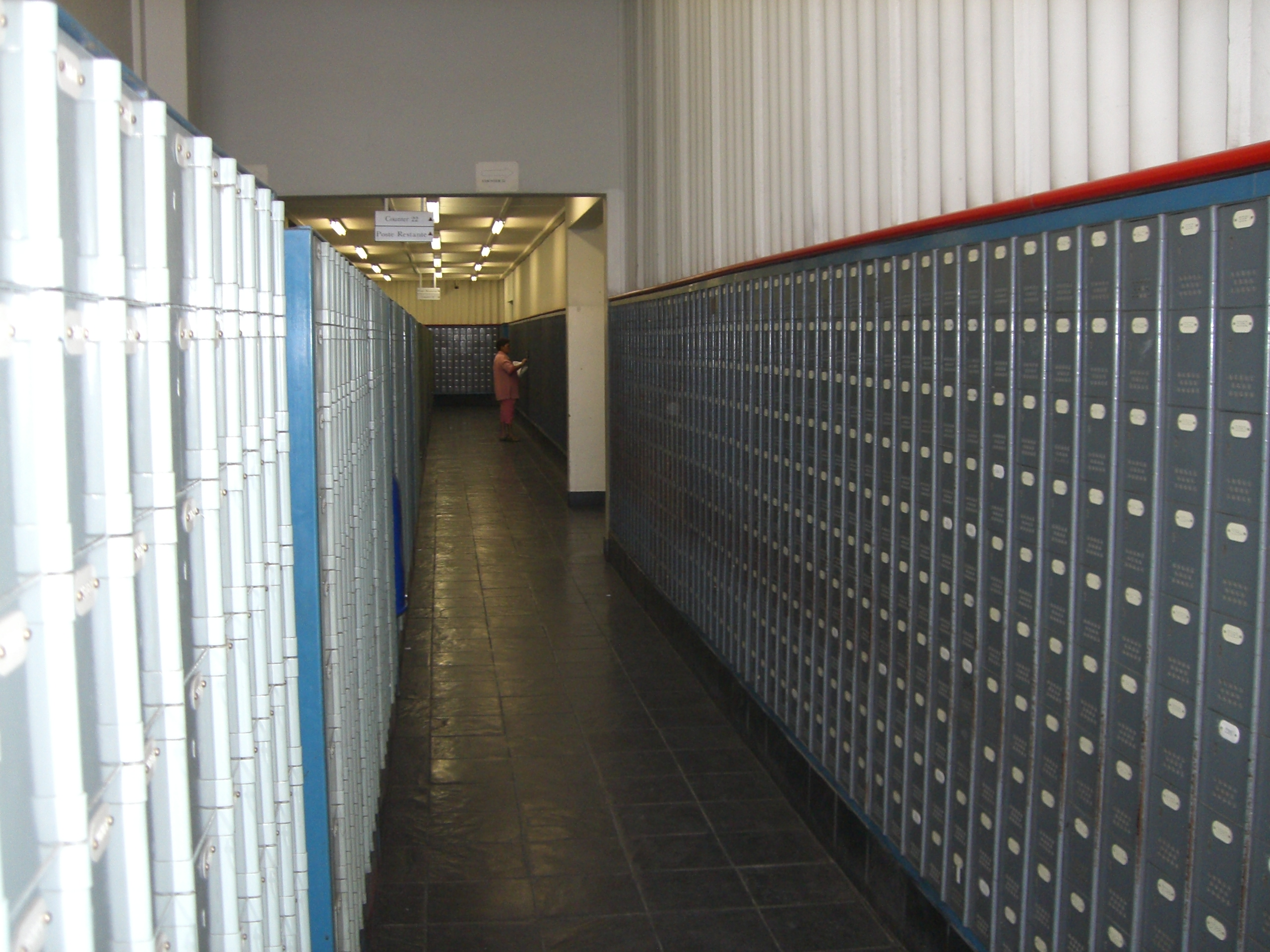
PO boxes inside the NamPost main building in Windhoek

Cameroon uses the PO Boxes in Kumba, Yaoundé, Douala, Bamenda, and other provinces.

In Namibia, PO boxes are the only form of mail delivery to private individuals. Even small settlements feature a block of PO boxes for rent. In the capital, Windhoek, blocks of PO boxes are scattered all over the city and not necessarily located at post offices but at shopping malls, in pedestrian zones or on public places.

The South African Post Office has Post Boxes available for rent. These are usually attached to or close to a post office. In urban areas with PO Boxes for rent there also may be home delivery of mail. In rural areas Post Boxes are often compulsory as no street deliveries take place. In the areas for which there is no street delivery, Post Boxes are not charged for. Boxes and Street delivery postal codes may be the same in an area, or may differ. Private Bags are available for recipients of large mail volumes.

=== Asia ===
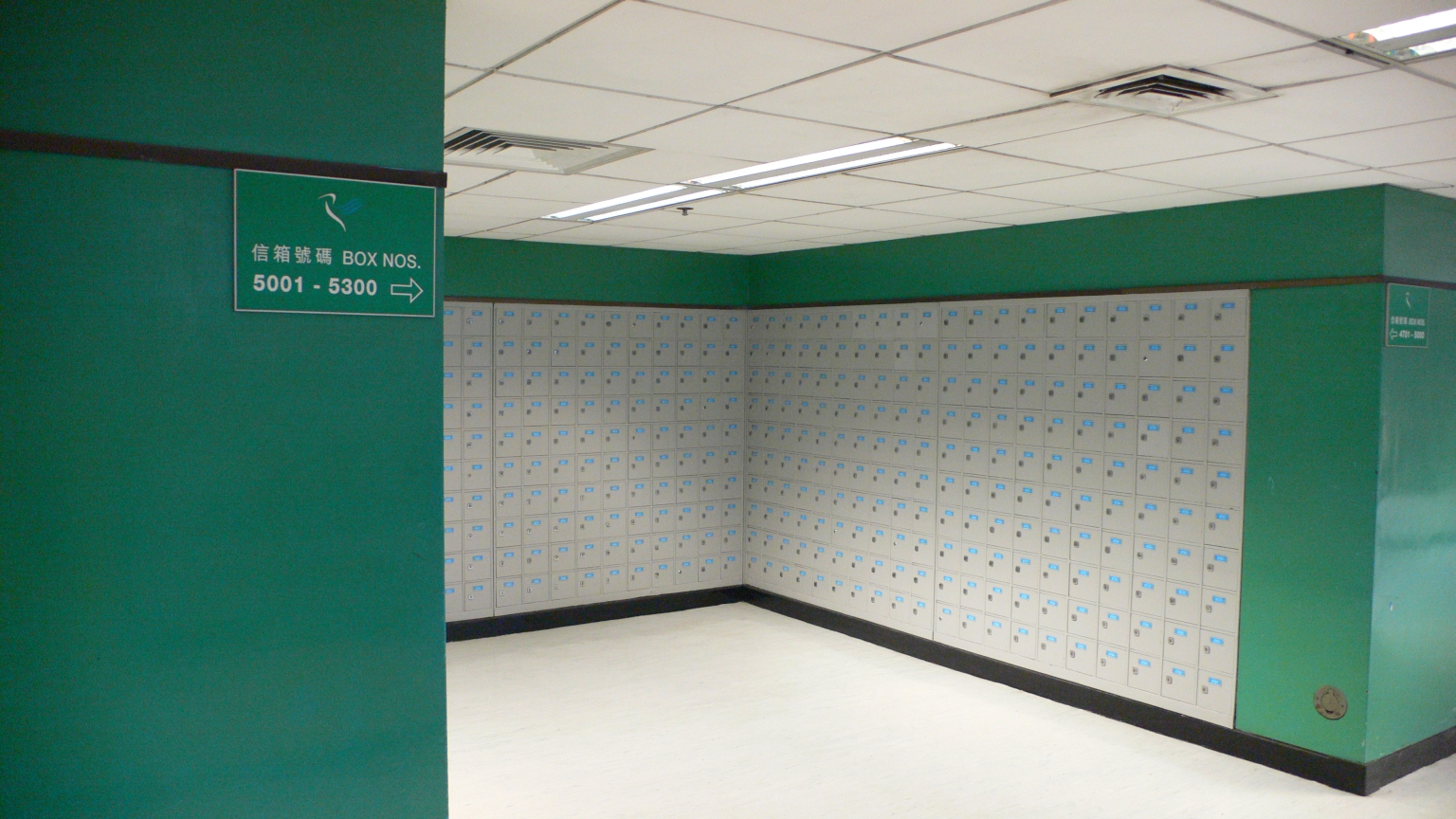
Post office boxes in General Post Office, Hong Kong

In Hong Kong, PO boxes are available in two different sizes. They are available in many post offices throughout the territory.

In Japan, PO boxes are available at most post office locations. There is no cost to rent a post office box as the box is provided to ease the effort in delivering postal items to regular customers. Therefore, renters must receive at least one postal item every day and are expected to visit and retrieve mail regularly (daily, in principle) from the box. The renter must also rent the box for six months or more. Boxes in the metropolitan areas are often full and a new user expects to wait for years or more.

In the Philippines, PO boxes are available for rent in selected post offices. PO boxes, also known as lock boxes, are available in three sizes: small, medium and large.

In South Korea, PO boxes are available in one size at selected post offices. There is no charge for renting PO box, but renter must fetch mail at least once in 30 days. Application is only available at post office with valid ID, seal for receiving registered mail, and key fee (usually around 10,000 won). Seoul CPO box room is the only PO box in Korea with fully automated mail retrieving system.

=== Europe ===
In Austria, PO Boxes come in one size, and four different versions:

1. Only Post addressed to the PO Box will be delivered to it,
2. All mail addressed to the address of the customer and the PO Box will be delivered to the PO Box,
3. Same as 1., but for businesses,
4. Same as 2., but for businesses, – they are generally available at all post offices throughout the country.

Only mail from Austrian Post can be delivered to an Austrian Post PO Box, but there are also private companies offering the same services.

In Serbia, anyone can apply for a post office box (Serbian: Поштански факс) for a very small yearly fee. Application contains identification and address information of a user. The user may choose what mail should be delivered to their postal office box and what should be delivered to the real address. If not specified otherwise, all mail goes to the post office box.

In the United Kingdom, anyone applying for a Royal Mail PO box must produce documentation to verify their home or business address. Post can be forwarded to the real address or collected by the addressee. Royal Mail PO boxes are often little more than pigeon-holes in the secure section of a sorting office and are accessible only by staff. In such cases, the renter of the PO box will be issued with a card showing the PO box number and delivery office name and must produce this to the desk staff when collecting mail. For an additional fee, the Royal Mail will deliver received items to the renter's geographical address.

=== North America ===
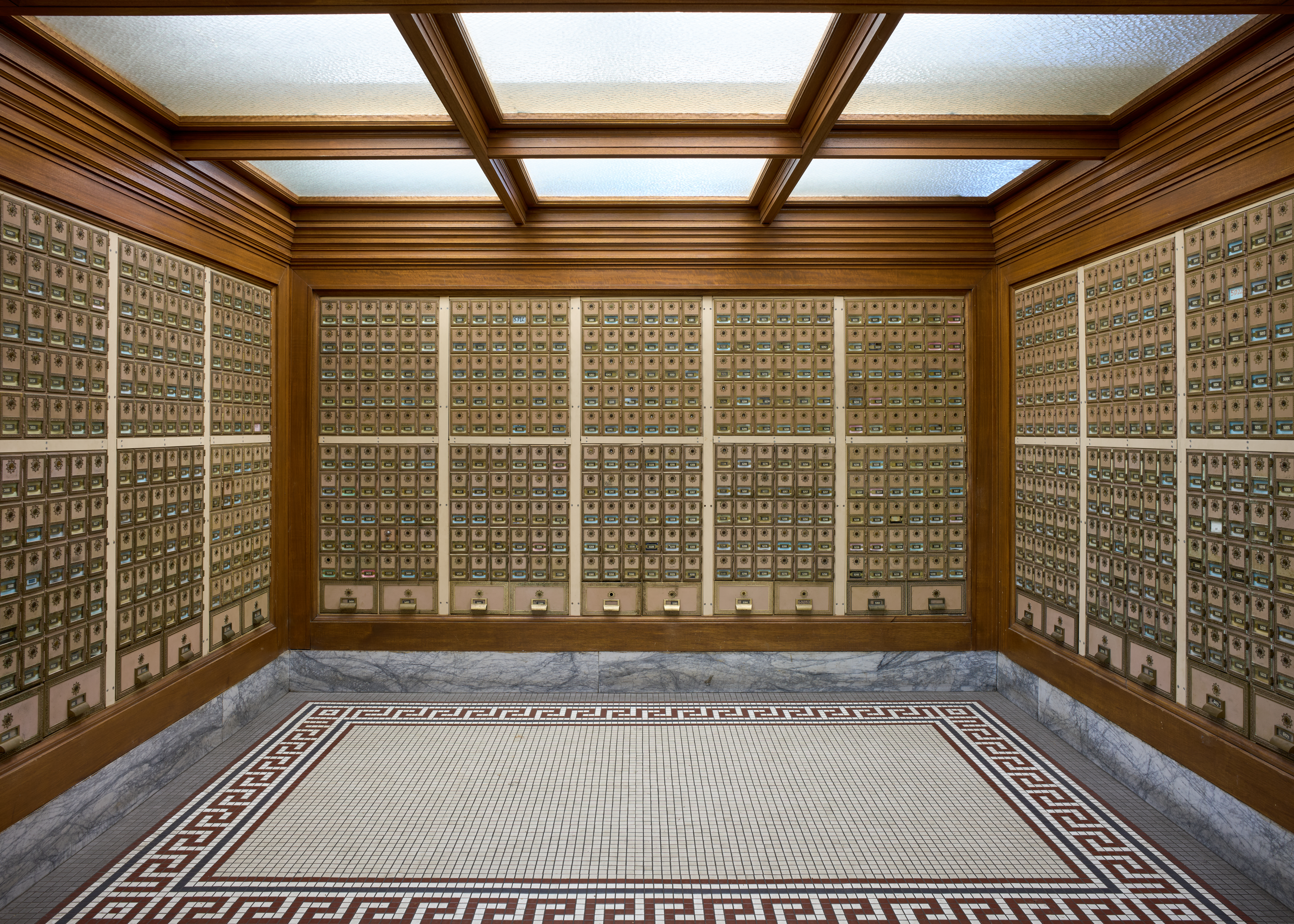
PO boxes at the historic U.S. Post Office in downtown Chico, California

In Canada and the United States, Postal Boxes are available in five different sizes (A, B, C, D, and E). They are generally available in all post offices throughout the country.

In the United States, PO Boxes are generally available through the United States Postal Service (USPS). They are usually arranged from the smallest boxes at the top to the largest boxes at the bottom. The two largest sizes may be configured as drawers. To rent a PO Box, two different forms of identification are required. At least one of them must be a valid photo ID. This also applies to others who wish to share the box with the original subscriber's permission, and are of legal age. The post office will not forward mail from a PO Box until the box is closed, and then only to one address for all subscribers. As part of the agreement to rent a PO Box, if the PO Box is used for business, the Post Office will provide, upon request, the geographical (street) address of the business.

Until 2012, only items mailed or shipped via USPS could be received at a USPS PO Box. However, a service called Street Addressing has begun to change this. Once a permission form is completed by the box holder, Street Addressing allows private shippers, such as United Parcel Service (UPS) or FedEx, to ship items to a modification of the actual street address of the Post Office where the PO Box is located. The Post Office accepts the item, and places it in the PO Box or, for larger items, handles them the same way they would a package sent via USPS (with some having storage lockers). Only certain Post Offices offer Street Addressing, and even for ones that do, it may not be available to all of its PO Box customers (e.g., for boxes without a fee). Other restrictions also exist, including the same limitations on items that cannot otherwise be mailed by ground service though USPS (not to be confused with items that cannot be shipped by air). In many cases, the package may require one additional business day for delivery, and the service was never intended for overnight delivery. Federal holidays not observed by the private shipper might also cause a delay. If an item is shipped using Street Addressing in which the box holder did not properly sign up for, it will be returned to sender.

Street Addressing will have the same street address of the post office, plus a "unit number" that matches the P.O. Box number. As an example, in El Centro, California, the post office is located at 1598 Main Street. Therefore, for P.O. Box 9975 (fictitious), the Street Addressing would be: 1598 Main Street Unit 9975, El Centro, CA. Nationally, the first five digits of the ZIP Code may or may not be the same as the P.O. Box address, and the last four digits (Zip + 4) are virtually always different. Except for a few of the largest post offices in the U.S., the 'Street Addressing' (not the P.O. Box address) nine digit Zip + 4 is the same for all boxes at a given location.

In the United States, the rental rate used to be uniform across the country before 2010. "The Postal Regulatory Commission (PRC) first approved the request for competitive pricing in 2010 at 49 Post Offices, and it's expanded to more locations since then." Now, however, a postal facility can be in any of seven fee groups by location; in addition, certain customers qualify for free box rental, usually because the Postal Service does not offer carrier-route delivery to their physical addresses.

Some private companies (e.g., United Parcel Service and commercial mail receiving agencies) offer similar services of renting a mailbox in a public location. The difference is that mail sent there is addressed to a street address (along with the private box number), instead of just addressed to "PO Box CSX". Virtual mailboxes are similar to P.O. boxes but usually provide additional services such as scanning or forwarding.

=== Oceania ===
In Australia, wall-mounted PO boxes come in five sizes: small, medium, large, jumbo and A4. The different sizes boxes can be mixed almost completely arbitrarily on the wall. There is also an option for locked private bag which comes in two different sizes as well: small and large. PO boxes and private locked bags can be combined.

In New Zealand, customers have the option to select between two sizes of PO Boxes: small and large. There is also an option to hire a Private Bag similar to "locked bags" in other countries. The annual fee is paid annually in advance.

== See also ==
- Post box – Box for collecting outgoing mail
- Poste restante – Holding service for mail
- Virtual mailbox – Service to receive physical mail for someone
