= Poste restante =

Holding service for mail

Poste restante (French pronunciation: [pɔst ʁɛstɑ̃t], "waiting mail"), also known as general delivery in North American English, is a service where the post office holds the mail until the recipient calls for it. It is a common destination for mail for people who are visiting a particular location and have no need, or no way, of having mail delivered directly to their place of residence at that time.

== By country ==
=== Argentina ===
The Poste Restante service is run by the national postal company, Correo Argentino.

Letter or parcels can be addressed with either the recipient's full name or their ID card number:

[Recipient's full name or Recipient's ID number]
Poste Restante
[Post Office's Postal Code] SUCURSAL [Office name] [(City)]

There is no specified time period for the recipient to pick up the letter. Upon retiring, the recipient must provide proof of identity and pay a charge equivalent to a simple mail service.

=== Australia ===
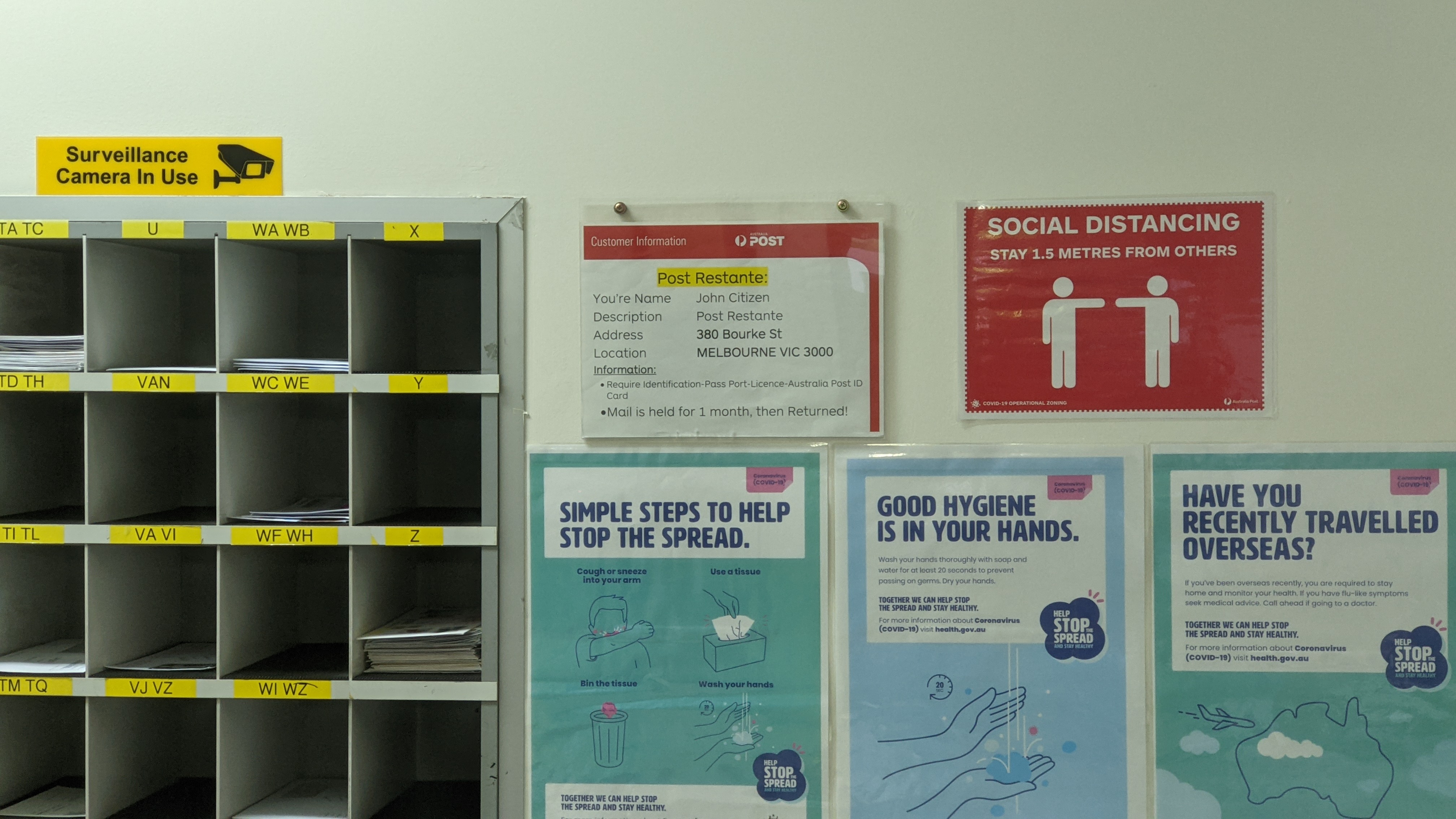
Notice posted at Australia Post's Melbourne GPO Private Box Centre, showing instructions on Poste Restante.

Poste restante (Counter Delivery) is a long-established service within Australia run by the national postal service, Australia Post, which allows one's post to be sent to a city-centre holding place. It will be held for up to 1 month and can be collected by providing proof of identity, such as a passport.

For example, for the Adelaide GPO (General Post Office, i.e. the main post office in the city of Adelaide) one would address a letter or parcel thus:

Recipient's Full Name
CARE OF POST OFFICE GPO Adelaide
SA 5001
Australia

The recipient would then need to go to the Adelaide GPO at 10 Franklin St to collect it when it was due to arrive or shortly afterwards. The approved abbreviation is "CARE PO". For outward bound international mail, the form "POSTE RESTANTE" is recognised. Mail that is not addressed in the approved form may be delayed for hand sorting.

=== Austria ===
In Austria, Poste restante can be used with a name or an agreed passphrase under which the envelope can be collected, followed by the indication Postlagernd (in capitals). A tax of €1 is collected from the addressee.

=== Belgium ===
Bpost uses the term poste restante (French), Postliggend (Dutch) or Postlagernd (German) which needs to be indicated on the post together with the name, optionally the first name, full name of the post office, postal code and city. The recipient has one month to collect the post, after which it will be sent back to the sender. A special tax applies valued at the price of one stamp of value 2; as of 1 March 2018, this price is €1.74. This tax is usually paid by the recipient but can also be paid by the sender.

Name of the recipient
Poste Restante
Full name of the post office
B-1234 City
Belgium

=== Bosnia and Herzegovina ===
In Bosnia and Herzegovina, mail is addressed to Poste restante, which is written after the full name of the recipient as shown in their ID document or passport.

Name of recipient
POSTE RESTANTE
12345 City

=== Bulgaria ===
In Bulgaria, mail is sent through either the national Postal Service, or through private courier companies (both are very common). The latter usually hold packages for at most 7 working days, whereas the Postal Service holds them indefinitely. The package is delivered to the postal office that services the address the letter is posted to. Conveniently, the numbers of the postal officers are also the ZIP codes.

The letter should be addressed with „Адрес на получател“, which simply means "Recipient Address", and it should feature the words „До поискване“ (literally: "until requested (asked for)", i.e. Poste Restante), followed by the street name, post code and city. Of course, they can also be written in latin script for international mail. The Bulgarian language uses the Numero sign („№“) - in this instance, for the address building number.

Адрес на получател:
Name of recipient
До поискване
ул. „Александър Екзарх“ №2
4000 Пловдив

For letters sent to rented PO boxes, the format is the same, but the words „До поискване“ are replaced with „До абонаментна пощенска кутия“. The system is the same otherwise.

=== Cambodia ===
In Cambodia, mail is addressed to Poste restante, which is written after the full name of the recipient. Parcels and letters should contain a phone number, but recipients are more likely to get notified by phone for a parcel.

Name of recipient
POSTE RESTANTE
City
Postcode #####
Province Name
Cambodia
Tel +855 ### ### ###

=== Canada ===
Canada Post uses the term general delivery in English, and poste restante in French. Travellers may use the service for up to four months, and it is also used in circumstances where other methods of delivery (such as post office boxes) are not available.

Canada Post guidelines for addressing of letter mail stipulate that general delivery mail should be addressed in the following fashion:

MR JOHN JONES
GD STN A
FREDERICTON NB E3B 1A1

where GD is the abbreviation for general delivery (alternatively "PR" for poste restante in French), and STN A is the station or post office (in this case, Station A). When the mail is to be delivered to a retail postal outlet, then the abbreviation RPO is used, and in French the station is indicated by SUCC for succursale, or retail postal outlet by "CSP" for comptoir postal. In the above example, the French version of the address would use "PR SUCC A" for the second line.

=== Croatia ===
In Croatia, mail is addressed to Poste restante, which is written after the full name of the recipient (as appears on the identification to be presented ID document or a passport, if abroad).

Name of recipient
POSTE RESTANTE
12345 City

In Croatia letters received to poste restante address are kept in post office for 30 calendar days.

=== Czech Republic ===
In the Czech Republic, mail can be addressed to the post office if Poste restante and the full name of the recipient is included. To retrieve the mail, the recipient has to have a valid ID, passport, or a driving licence. The mail will be retained for only 15 days.

Name of the recipient
Details (such as – summer camp etc.), or leave blank
POSTE RESTANTE
12345 City

=== Denmark ===
Mail is held for 14 days.

=== Finland ===
Poste restante is offered widely throughout Finland in 425 post office addresses as of August 2020. In Finland, letters received to poste restante address are kept in post office for 14 days after arrival.

Before 1 April 2013, it was possible to use a nickname instead of real name and without providing an ID. In 2019, picking up mail from poste restante was to become paid service, but the planned fee was cancelled.

=== France ===
In France, La Poste offers the service for letters at an additional cost to be paid by the receiver Letters are kept for 15 days. The service is offered at any post office. The only requirement is to add Poste restante after the recipient's name and before the full address of the post office.

For the post office of Paris Louvre the address would be :

Recipient's Name
Poste Restante
50 rue du Louvre
75001 PARIS

Fare table for mainland French Poste Restante
Type of shipment	Cost
Letters (under 3 cm of height)	€1.49
Printed press	€0.72
Parcels	5.44

=== Germany ===
Deutsche Post offer the service for all mail items under the Postlagernd (General Delivery) service. Domestic items may make use of a passphrase instead of the recipients name if preferred. As of 2022, the item should be addressed to the Hauptpost (main post office) of the location or certain other post offices designated as offering this service; smaller post offices and post agencies (contractor outlets) do not accept poste restante and may return the item.

Address Format:

Recipient Name
Kennwort: [passphrase] (optional)
Postlagernd
Post Office address
Post Office postcode/town

The phrase Kennwort: (Password) in front of the passphrase requires the consignee to specify the passphrase at time of collection. Items may be collected from the designated post office upon production of valid identification (e.g. Passport) and the passphrase.

It is important to use the term Postlagernd in preference to, or in conjunction with, Poste restante to prevent returned mail.

=== Gibraltar ===
Royal Gibraltar Post Office allows letters and parcels to be received. ID is required for collection.

The address format is:

Name of recipient
Poste Restante
General Post Office
Gibraltar

=== Greece ===
In Greece you can send small parcels under 2 kg to the Greece post office.

Address Format:

POSTE RESTANTE
Recipient's Name
Post office address
Post office zip code
Town
Greece

To collect your mail if it is addressed and stamped to you by bring your passport and ID with you.

=== Hong Kong ===
In Hong Kong, Hongkong Post is responsible for handling the mail and mail can be sent to General Post Office only.

At the address side, mark the mail with Poste Restante or 存局待領 in bold.

The address format is like this:

Name of recipient
Name of post office (optional)
Hong Kong

The name of recipient must be real and in full. No initial or figure is allowed.

=== Hungary ===
Hungarian post requires poste restante (postán maradó) delivery to be addressed to specific post offices. Additionally, the postal service provides a "pick-up" service for web-based businesses where a business can ship to a pick-up point.

=== India ===
India Post offers a Poste Restante service of up to two months at various post offices throughout the country. Mail is addressed thus:

Mr./Mrs. SURNAME First name
Poste Restante
C/O POSTMASTER
GPO [for General Post Office]
City name
State name
India

Carry a passport or some other form of national identification to pick it up.

In India, letters are said to be held for around a month, up to two in larger GPOs, before being returned; so senders should add their return address, or use the recipient's home address as a return destination.

=== Ireland ===
In Ireland, An Post's "Address Point" service is ″a fixed address for those without a fixed home.″

An Post also offer poste restante, as a free service which allows visitors to a town to have their mail addressed to the local Post Office, where it will be held for collection.

=== Italy ===
In Italy, writing fermoposta together with the full name of the addressee and postal code will activate general delivery at the relevant post office. Letter post is retained for 30 days; parcel post is normally retained for 15 days, with an exceptional period of 1 month.

=== Japan ===
In Japan, the term Yuubinkyoku-dome (郵便局留め) indicates a Poste restante mail.

The Japan Post Service guidelines for addressing stipulate that general delivery domestic mail should be addressed in the following fashion:

163-8799
東京都新宿区西新宿
新宿郵便局留め
山田太郎 様
(TEL 090-xxxx-xxxx)

For international mail,

Mr. Taro Yamada
Shinjuku-Yuubinkyoku-dome
Nishi-Shinjuku, Shinjuku-ku, Tokyo-to 163–8799 JAPAN
(TEL 090-xxxx-xxxx)

where "163-8799" is the postcode of the post office, "Nishi-Shinjuku, Shinjuku-ku, Tokyo-to" is the address of the post office, "Shinjuku-Yuubinkyoku" is the name of the post office, and "-dome" means "keep it there".

A poste restante mail will be kept in the post office for 10 days, identification is required for pickup.

=== Lithuania ===
In Lithuania, the words Poste restante or Iki pareikalavimo (used locally in Lithuania) should be made bold.

For local mail:

Name of recipient (in dative case)
Iki pareikalavimo
Name of post office
12345 City
Mob. tel.: 86xxxxxxx and/or (optional mobile number for notifying with SMS message about received registered mail)
email@address.com (optional e-mail address for notifying about received registered mail)

=== Luxembourg ===
The Luxembourg Post has discontinued the service and poste restante is not possible anymore.

=== Macau ===
CTT (Macau) offers Poste Restante service (Posta Restante) to Macau's visitors or those who do not have a fixed residence in Macau. Upon collection, the addressee needs to pay MOP 6.50 as the administration fee (additional charges may apply). The recipient's address must include the words 存局候領 (in Chinese) or Posta Restante (in Portuguese). The addressee's name must be real name, in conformity to his/her name shown on an identity card or passport. The address format is as follows:

Name of addressee
POSTA RESTANTE
Name of post office or branch office
Locality (e.g. Macau, Taipa, etc.)
Macau Special Administrative Region

=== Malta ===
MaltaPost offers Poste restante service from a post office in the capital Valletta for up to three months, after which mail is returned to sender. Prior to using the service, the person must inform MaltaPost via email, and a means of identification needs to be provided when picking up the mail. Mail should be addressed as follows:

Name of recipient
Poste Restante
Valletta Boxes
75, Old Bakery Str
IL-BELT VALLETTA
VLT 1000
MALTA

=== Netherlands ===
PostNL offers Poste restante service for up to one month, after which the mail will be returned to the original sender (if provided). This service is provided by all Dutch post offices. Mail should be addressed thus:

Last name of recipient
First name of recipient
Poste Restante
Name and address of post office
The Netherlands

=== New Zealand ===
New Zealand Post offers a Poste restante service of up to two months at various post offices throughout the country. Mail is addressed thus:

Name of Recipient
Poste Restante
Name of post office
Post office's address
Town and postcode

=== Norway ===
In Norway, Norway Post provides the Poste restante service in all post offices. Ordinary mail is returned to sender three weeks after arrival. Parcels and registered letters are returned to sender after two weeks. Valid foreign identification for obtaining mail is limited to passports and European Identity cards. Mail is addressed according to the following format:

Name of recipient
POSTE RESTANTE
Name of post office
Post office's address
Post office's postcode and place

=== Poland ===
Mail should be addressed according to the following format:

Name of recipient
Poste Restante
12-345 City 6

where 12-345 represents the postal code of the post office and 6 represents post office number within given city. (In Poland every post office is uniquely identified by city and number, e.g. "Warszawa 1" or "Kraków 35". These numbers are used only when the post office itself is the point of delivery, e.g. mailboxes or poste restante). There is no address of a recipient on the envelope, and if no sender address is provided, mail is considered undeliverable after 14 days. Every Poczta Polska office is valid target for poste restante delivery and the service is provided with no additional cost. All types of mail, e.g. letters, parcels and money orders, can be sent to poste restante.

=== Portugal ===
In Portugal, CTT provides the Poste restante service (Portuguese: Posta Restante) in all post offices. The mail will be kept in the post office until the last day of the following month after it was received. Mail is addressed according to the following format:

Name of recipient
Posta Restante Loja XXXXXXX (name of the post office)
Address of Post Office
Postcode and place

The recipient pays a levy to collect the mail.

=== Russia ===
The most widely available Russian mail delivery (state-run) company, Russian Post, provides Poste restante services.

In order to collect a parcel, the individual is required to provide an ID document (usually a passport) that matches the indicated receiver's information. Alternatively, an electronic signature (SMS code) may be used if the package's tracking number is known. The parcel is stored for up to 30 days, depending on the type of mail. As of 2019, the packages delivered by courier may be stored up to 15 days and letters – up to 30.

The information on parcels should be as following (as per Russian Post) in order for the parcel to be stored:

Name of recipient
Address of destination (optional, may be omitted): city, street, building, entry (if any), apartment number
Postal code
DO VOSTREBOVANIYA / Poste restante

The Russian phrase До востребования may be used instead of Do Vostrebovaniya. The phrase is a phonetic transliteration and indicates that the parcel has to be stored in a postal office (Russian: почтовое отделение, lit. 'postal division') until the receiver collects it. The storage time is calculated from the moment when the parcel was received by the office. Parcels with such marks are not delivered to the mail boxes.

Russian Post advises outgoing international packages be marked with Poste restante in the same way.

For incoming parcels, a certain fee must be paid if the package's cost or weight exceeds the duty-free limits. Until early 2022, the limits were €200 and 31 kg (approx. 68 lbs) per package (regardless of the number of packages received over a time period). After Russian imports had been sanctioned following the invasion of Ukraine, the cost limit was temporarily increased to €1,000.

=== Serbia ===
In Serbia, mail is addressed to Post-Restant or Poste restante, which is written after the full name of the recipient (as appears on the identification to be presented ID document or a passport, if abroad).

The example of address is as follows :

John Richmond
POST-RESTANT or POSTE RESTANTE
Sremčica
11253
Srbija

Upon arrival in the post-residual parcel section of the destination post office, the parcel is stored for 30 days, from the day of arrival.

=== Singapore ===
This service is only for the convenience of travelers to Singapore. The words Poste restante or To Be Called For must appear next to the recipient's full name on a postal article.

=== Slovakia ===
In Slovakia, the post office will hold mail sent to an address containing words Poste restante, even when the full address is specified. The post office will not notify the recipient about the delivery, and will hold the mail for 18 days, unless told otherwise by the sender. After that, the mail is returned to the sender.

To pick up the mail, the recipient needs to show their ID card or passport. They also may have to provide a tracking number.

Full legal name of the recipient
Poste restante
PSČ City

=== Slovenia ===
In Slovenia mail is addressed to poštno ležeče, written after the full name of the recipient as it appears on the personal ID card or passport, which is to be presented when the letter is collected.

Name of recipient
POŠTNO LEŽEČE
1234 City
Country (for international post)

In Slovenia letters received for a poste restante address are kept by the post office for 15 calendar days.

=== Spain ===
Mail can also be received at Spanish post offices. There is normally no charge for the service. Poste restante letters should be addressed Lista de Correos, followed by the address of the post office (including the postcode, town and province). Put the recipient's surname in capitals. An example Lista de Correos address is:

John SMITH
Lista de Correos
Pl. Rosa dels Vents 9
46730 Gandia
Valencia
Spain

To find the address of the Correos nearest to you, check at www.correos.es. Click on the Oficinas link for the Localizador de Oficinas.

When collecting mail from the post office recipients will need to show some form of identification such as a passport or photo driving license. They will need to specify that they are collecting a Lista de Correos item as these are stored separately from the other stored mail. The Lista de Correos mail is filed alphabetically and it may be worth asking them to check if an expected package was filed under your first name if they cannot find it under your surname. Post offices vary in how long they will hold your mail.

When addressing mail for Spain, always ensure that there is a return address on the parcel or packet.

=== Sweden ===
Not all post offices offer poste restante. The address is entered using the following format:

Name of recipient
Poste Restante
123 45 City

Here, 123 45 represents the postal number of the post office. Post offices providing poste restante services can be located by searching for poste restante as "street address" in a given city (giving a postal number) and then searching for post offices with that postal number.

=== Switzerland ===
In Switzerland, all post offices offer poste restante for free for up to one month for letters only, no parcels. Addressing takes the following format:

Name of recipient
Poste restante
[street/n° of the preferred post office]
1234 City

Here, 1234 represents the postal number of the post office. The correct street address can be found online.

=== Thailand ===
In Thailand, only a destination post office with a storage facility for poste restante will offer this service. Senders should write Poste restante at ______ Post Office (Thai: รอจ่าย ไปรษณีย์______ or รอจ่าย ปณ.______) or Poste restante at a destination Post Office (the second instance will place the mail at the distributional post office nearest to the recipient's address) after the name of the recipient. For example.

Mr. Meedee Khonthai (Name of recipient must match Official ID or Passport)
Poste restante at Phasi Charoen Post Office, 10160
+66xx-xxx-xxxx

or

Mr. Meedee Khonthai (Name of recipient must match Official ID or Passport)
Poste restante at a destination Post Office,
Bang Khae Nuea, Bang Khae
Bangkok, Thailand 10160
+66xx-xxx-xxxx

or in the Thai language:

นายมีดี คนไทย (Name of recipient must match Official ID or Passport)
รอจ่าย ไปรษณีย์ภาษีเจริญ
แขวงบางแคเหนือ เขตบางแค
กรุงเทพฯ 10160
+66xx-xxx-xxxx

There is a small amount of storage fee (1–2 Thai baht) when picking up the mail or parcel. The recipient must track the delivery status themselves via the tracking number provided. Accordingly, it is recommended to deliver using registered mail or EMS as the regular mail delivery service does not provide a tracking number.

=== Turkey ===
For Istanbul, the main parcel and poste restante office is in Sirkeci, a few minutes walk from the Sirkeci tram stop.

Name of recipient as appears on Passport or Official ID
Post Restante (in large and clear letters)
PTT Baş Müdürlüğü,
Hobyar Mahallesi,
Yeni Postane Caddesi No.25,
Sirkeci, Istanbul

=== United Kingdom ===
In the United Kingdom, mail is addressed to Poste restante, which is written after the full name of the recipient), then the name and full address of the destination post office, thus:

Mr. John Smith
POSTE RESTANTE
Islington Post Office
160-161 Upper Street
London N1 1US

If only addressed to a town name, for example "POSTE RESTANTE, LONDON", mail will go to the closest main post office branch (there being more than a hundred "crown offices" – directly managed post office branches – in London). Some small branches do not offer the poste restante service.

The sender should also include their return address. In the United Kingdom, the Royal Mail will hold mail posted from within the UK for 18 days, whereas mail posted from abroad is held for 21 days. Mail uncollected after these timescales is treated as undeliverable.

=== United States ===
In the United States, the U.S. Postal Service uses the term General Delivery. Mail for general delivery to recipients in the United States is addressed in the following fashion:

JOHN DOE
GENERAL DELIVERY
WASHINGTON DC 20090-9999

General delivery is normally available at only one facility under the administration of a post office with multiple facilities. Post offices that hold mail for general delivery may hold such mail for up to 30 days. When sending to general delivery, the optional ZIP+4 add-on code is -9999.

== See also ==
- Post office box
- Will call
