= The UPS Store =

American chain of shipping and packaging stores

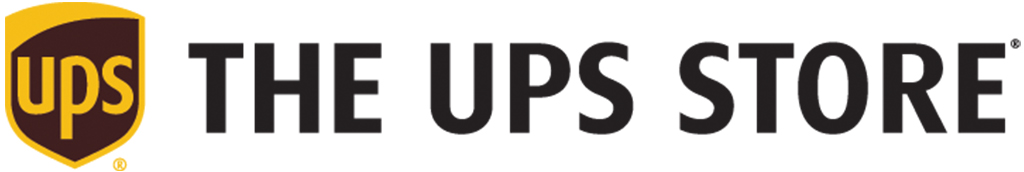
- Company type: Subsidiary
- Industry: Retail and Franchising
- Founded: August 1, 1980; 45 years ago (as Mail Boxes Etc.); 2003 (as The UPS Store)
- Headquarters: San Diego, California, U.S.
- Area served: United States and Canada
- Services: Packaging and labeling, Shipping, Postal, Printing, and Business Services
- Parent: United Parcel Service
- Website: theupsstore.com

The UPS Store (formerly the United States arm of Mail Boxes Etc.) is a franchised subsidiary of United Parcel Service which provides, according to its website, shipping, shredding, printing, fax, passport photos, personal and business mailboxes, and notary services.

== History ==
In March 2001, UPS acquired Mail Boxes Etc., which was founded in 1980 as an alternative to the post office. In February 2003, UPS rebranded more than 3,000 Mail Boxes Etc. locations as The UPS Store. Each location is independently owned.

== Services ==
The UPS Store offers shipping, packaging, printing, shredding, notary services and postal services for individual consumers and small businesses. Franchise locations are typically found on or near military bases, hotels, colleges, shopping centers and convention centers. As of 2021, there were 5,268 UPS Store locations across the United States and Canada.

Each UPS Store also serves as an access point for UPS shipping where customers can drop off packages with prepaid labels, as well as pack and ship new shipments.

The UPS Store's other major industry is printing. The store offers brochures, door hangers, car magnets, flyers, yard signs, menus for restaurants, manuals, and 3D printing.

== Awards ==
In 2019 and 2020, The UPS Store was ranked fifth overall among the top franchise brands in Entrepreneur Magazine’s Franchise 500 list. The company ranked third on the Franchise 500 list in 2021.
