= Mail Boxes Etc. =

Italian shipping and printing company

- Type: Subsidiary
- Founded: 1980; 46 years ago United States
- Headquarters: Milan, Italy
- Products: Pack & Ship, Ecommerce & Logistics, Marketing & Print
- Website: mbeglobal.com

Mail Boxes Etc. (MBE) is an American-Italian third-party provider of shipping, fulfilment, printing, and marketing services through a network of franchised locations. MBE is an Italian family–owned holding company headquartered in Milan, Italy. It ranks among the world's networks of service centers, offering shipping, logistics, printing, marketing, and design services to both businesses and private customers.

== History ==
Mail Boxes Etc. was founded in the United States in 1980 by Gerald Aul, Pat Senn, and Robert Diais. By the year 2000, MBE had expanded to include 4,000 locations worldwide, including South Korea and Sweden.

MBE operates a network of retail centers providing packing and shipping services, logistics support, communications, and marketing services to both business and private customers. The majority of the centers are owned by franchisees, both individual and master franchisees.

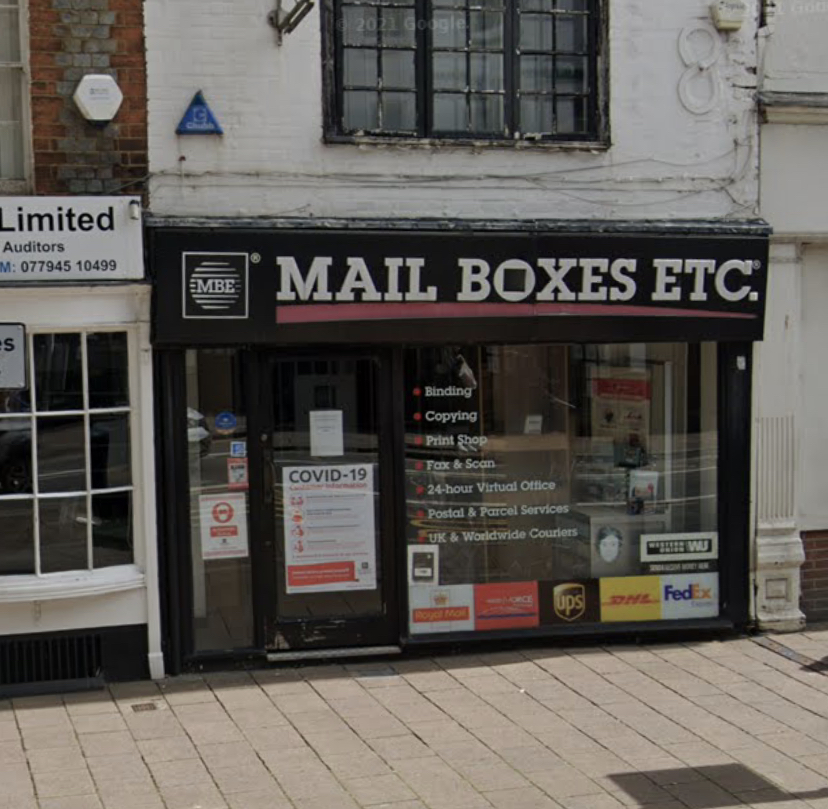
A branch of MBE in Reading, England.

=== Acquisition by UPS ===
In 2001, United Parcel Service (UPS) acquired Mail Boxes Etc., Inc. locations in the United States and Canada out of bankruptcy. On April 7, 2003, UPS began converting the 3,000 Mail Boxes Etc. locations in the United States and Canada (at the time, nearly 90% of the domestic U.S. network) to The UPS Store and started offering lower UPS direct shipping rates, with an average reduction of around 20%.

These centers remain locally owned and operated, continuing to offer packing, shipping, freight, postal services, printing, and business services.

=== MBE Worldwide/Fortidia ===
In 2009, MBE Worldwide, was established to acquire the existing Mail Boxes Etc. network from UPS worldwide, excluding the United States and Canada. MBE Worldwide subsequently expanded across Western Europe, establishing a direct presence in France in 2012, Poland in 2014, and the United Kingdom and Republic of Ireland in 2021.

As of 31 December 2016, MBE Worldwide had nearly 1,600 locations in 30 countries, with total sales of €427 million in 2016.

In November 2024, MBE Worldwide announced a rebranding and is now known as Fortidia.

As of 31 December 2024, Fortidia had nearly 3,100 locations in 57 countries, with total sales of €1.4 bln SwR.

=== Acquisitions ===
In 2017, MBE Worldwide acquired two U.S. companies, PostNet International Franchise and AlphaGraphics Inc. With these acquisitions, the MBE network expanded to approximately 2,500 service centers, including 500 in the US and 2,000 in 43 countries. In 2021, MBE Worldwide also acquired Pack & Send, a shipping and logistics brand in Australia, New Zealand, and the United Kingdom, as well as MultiCopy, a Netherlands-based company that provides print and marketing services. In addition, Prestashop joined the MBE Worldwide group in November 2021. In 2022, MBE Worldwide purchased a majority stake in the United Kingdom company World Options Ltd. and an Italian tech proximity logistics platform, GEL Proximity.
