= National Change of Address =

System for tracking changes of address

National Change of Address (NCOALink) is "a secure dataset of approximately 160 million permanent change-of-address (COA) records consisting of the names and addresses of individuals, families and businesses who have filed a change-of-address with the USPS". It is a postal address verification system maintained by the United States Postal Service, and access to it is licensed to service providers and made available to mailers. There are six licenses available including Full Service Providers (48 months) and Limited Service Providers (18 months). The use of NCOALink is required in order to obtain bulk mail rates, as it minimizes the number of UAA (Undeliverable As Addressed) mailpieces saving the mailer money and reducing the USPS's processing of this type of mail.

== Overview ==
NCOALink is a product of the United States Postal Service (USPS) and is used to provide updated and accurate addresses for individuals, families, and businesses. It will also indicate foreign moves and people who have moved with no forwarding address. The USPS offers licenses for Interface Developers and Interface Distributors and all NCOALink interfaces are certified by the USPS. The addresses in the database are specifically designed to match the USPS requirements. Each entry is matched against other entries to ensure that there are no repeated addresses. The software will update old addresses through the information provided by the postal service. Consumers have the option of changing their address online or filling out the "Change of Address" form at the Post Office when moving.

For mailers who want to update their mailing lists with the most current addresses they would submit their file to a company that offers the NCOALink service. These can be licensed NCOALink providers or third party companies that submit the files to a licensed NCOALink provider. The NCOALink process also includes CASS (Coding Accuracy Support System), DPV (Delivery Point Validation), LACSLink, and SuiteLink.

In 2015, one company estimated undeliverable mail cost the US economy $65 billion a year.

== Potential for fraud ==
With today's focus on data security, accusations have been made that the USPS has taken insufficient efforts to protect the privacy of the roughly 40 million Americans every year who use the service. Additionally, the actual change of address registration process is vulnerable to fraudulent activity because no verification is done on the paper form.

== History ==
The current National Change of Address program was set up in 1986. The National Change of Address System has been adopted by several countries including the US, the UK, Canada, Germany, Austria, and New Zealand.
