= Mail forwarding =

Postal service for change of address, etc.

Post offices and other mail service providers typically offer a mail forwarding service, commonly known as hybrid mail or virtual post office box services, to redirect mail addressed to one location to another address – usually for a given period. In the case of the United States Postal Service's First Class Mail, it is generally for a period of one year. British Royal Mail provides a service called Mail Redirection, enabling redirection for up to two years. Customers of such a service usually, but not exclusively, use mail forwarding when they change an address.

The mail forwarding service offered by postal authorities should be distinguished from private mail forwarding services. Private mail forwarding services tend to offer additional services that might not be provided by governmental services, such as mail scanning services, online mailbox management and various domestic and international delivery options.

Private mail forwarders were also used before the Universal Postal Union standardized the way international mail was delivered and paid for, for example to send mail via a third country.

== Regulations ==
=== Malta ===
MaltaPost provides a redirection of mail service, ranging from a move of a few days to a permanent move, including overseas. Redirection is made for a period of up to one year for individuals, NGOs and non-profit organizations, or up to three years for businesses and other entities.

=== United Kingdom ===
Since 1 October 2007, borough councils in London are empowered to require local private mail forwarding services to register with them, under the London Local Authority Act 2007, section 75. Registered services must obtain evidence of identity from their customers and retain copies of those documents. They also have to keep records of the customer's name and address/registered office and addresses to which mail is sent. It is a criminal offence for a person to fail to comply with section 75, to provide false information when making an application, or to make false entries in records.

Companies operating in the UK outside London are required either to be licensed by HMRC or supervised by an authorised body, such as the Financial Conduct Authority. They also must keep records under the Anti-Money Laundering Regulations.

=== United States ===
United States Postal Service (USPS) is an independent federal agency that provides postal services, such as mail forwarding, to the public. When using a private forwarder to forward mail, USPS form 1583 is required.

Private mail forwarding services are also offered by private forwarding companies, who often offer features like the ability to see your mail online via a virtual mailbox. Virtual mailboxes usually have options to get your mail scanned, discard junk mail and forward mail to your current address. Private forwarding companies usually have a monthly service fee and shipping fees for shipping the mail. When new users apply for the service, the company will assign them an address where they can receive their US mail and packages. This type of service is mostly used by people moving outside the US, such as expatriates, long term travelers or retirees and international shoppers who wish to shop online for US products. Since many online retailers do not ship overseas, and border restrictions affect the delivery of their packages to their designated countries, people living outside the US need a US address to get products delivered to a local address, from which they can ship to themselves. Forwarding companies usually alert their customers when their ordered packages are available. The customer usually has the option to instruct the mail forwarding company how, when and where to ship their package and also to pick which shipper to use.

== See also ==
- Forwarding agent (philately)
- Hybrid mail
- Commercial mail receiving agency
- Email forwarding
- Poste restante
- Drop shipping
- Package forwarding
