= Timeline of postal history =

This is a partial timeline of significant events in postal history, including dates and events relating to postage stamps.

== 559–530 BC ==
- Chapar Khaneh, the state-run courier (and transportation) service of the Persian Empire was established by Cyrus the Great, and later developed by Darius the Great as the royal method of communication throughout the empire.

== First century ==
- Cursus publicus, the state-run courier (and transportation) service of the Roman Empire was established by Augustus based on Chapar Khaneh of the Persians.

== Sixteenth century ==
- 1516 - Henry VIII established a "Master of the Posts"
- 1520 - Manuel I creates the public mail service of Portugal, the Correio Público-Public Post Office
- 1558 18 October - Sigismund II Augustus established Poczta Polska, a postal service of the Polish–Lithuanian Commonwealth.

== Seventeenth century ==
- 1635 31 July - Charles I made the Royal Mail service available to the public for the first time with postage being paid by the recipient.
- 1660 - General Post Office established in England by Charles II.
- 1680 - The first penny post system, known as the London Penny Post, for local delivery was introduced by William Dockwra in London.

== Eighteenth century ==
- 1775 - The Continental Congress appoints Benjamin Franklin to be the first United States Postmaster General
- 1792 20 February - The US Postal Service Act establishes the United States Post Office Department.

== 1820s ==
- 1821 - Carlo Meratti, an Italian, living in Alexandria, establishes a post office to send and receive mail to and from foreign countries.
- 1825 - The US establishes a dead letter office.

== 1830s ==
- 1830 – First mail train in United Kingdom of Great Britain and Ireland.
- 1831 - Independent Irish and Scottish Post Offices united under the Postmaster General of the United Kingdom, 31 years after the Act of Union
- 1839 5 December - Uniform Fourpenny Post starts throughout the UK.

== 1840s ==
- 1840 10 January - Uniform Penny Post starts throughout the United Kingdom.
- 1840 1 May - United Kingdom issues the Penny Black and Two Pence Blue, the world's first postage stamps.
- 1842 1 February City Despatch Post New York local post.
- 1843 1 March - Zürich issue their first stamps: Zürich 4 and 6.
- 1843 1 August - Bull's Eyes, first stamps of Brazil
- 1843 30 September - Geneva issue their first stamps: Double Geneva.
- 1845 - Creation of the New York Postmaster's Provisional
- 1845 - The US star routes begin operation.
- 1847 21 September Mauritius issues its first stamps, the Mauritius "Post Office" stamps, or the Red Penny and Blue Penny.
- 1848 - first use of Perot Provisionals in Bermuda
- 1849 1 July - first stamps of Belgium, known as the "Epaulettes" type

== 1850s ==
- 1851 23 April - The Province of Canada issues its first stamp, the Three-Penny Beaver, designed by Sandford Fleming.
- 1852 - Scinde Dawks in India
- 1853 - first stamps of Portugal
- 1854 - first stamps of India
- 1858 - London is divided into postal districts, precursor of British Postcode System.

== 1860s ==
- 1860 1 December - first stamps of Malta
- 1860 - The Pony Express operates in the western United States for a short time.
- 1864 - United States establishes railroad post offices.
- 1867 - first stamps of Austrian post offices in the Turkish Empire

== 1870s ==
- 1874 9 October - General Postal Union (later Universal Postal Union) is formed.
- 1878 - General Postal Union becomes the Universal Postal Union.

== 1890s ==
- 1896 - United States experiments with rural free delivery, is made permanent in 1902.

== 1910s ==
- 1911 - United States creates a postal savings system.
- 1913 - United States initiates parcel post service, using special stamps.
- 1916 - United States postal inspectors solve the last known stagecoach robbery in the US.
- 1918 - United States issues its first airmail stamps; a sheet of the Inverted Jenny is discovered among them.

== 1930s ==
- 1935 - United States initiates Trans-Pacific airmail service.
- 1939 - Postal censorship introduced in several countries, both combatants and neutrals, involved in World War II

== 1940s ==
- 1941 - United States creates highway post offices.
- 1942 - United States uses V-mail to handle armed forces' mail.
- 1946 - first stamps of independent Jordan

== 1950s ==
- 1955 - United States initiates certified mail service.
- 1957 - United States establishes Citizens' Stamp Advisory Committee to choose stamp designs
- 1959 - UK Postcode scheme introduced.
- 1959 - The USS Barbero and United States Postal Service attempt the delivery of mail via Missile Mail.

== 1960s ==
- 1963 - United States introduces the ZIP Code.
- 1964 - 9 February - Sierra Leone issues the world's first self-adhesive stamps.
- 1966 - United States ends its postal savings system.
- 1968 - United States initiates priority mail as a type of first-class mail.

== 1970s ==
- 1970 - United States passes Postal Reorganization Act, which changed the postal service from a government department to a corporation owned by the government.
- 1970 - United States initiates experimental express mail service, makes it permanent in 1977.
- 1971 - United States Postal Service begins operation as a corporation.
- 1971 1 April - Canadian six-character postal codes introduced.
- 1974 - United States ends its use of highway post offices.
- 1977 30 June - United States ends use of railroad post offices.

== 1980s ==
- 1982 - United States introduces E-COM, an electronic message service.
- 1983 - United States introduces ZIP + 4.
- 1984 21 November - first stamps of Burkina Faso
- 1985 - United States terminates E-COM service.

== 2000s ==
- 2007, 12 April - USPS issues a non-denominated stamp called the forever stamp
- 2011, 13 July - newly independent South Sudan issues its first postage stamps.
- 2015, 1 February - Megan Brennan appointed first female US Postmaster General
