= FICC =

FICC is an abbreviation that may refer to:

- FICC (film festival), the Mexico City International Film Festival
- FICC (banking), the group within an investment bank that handles fixed income instruments, currencies, and commodities
- Fixed Income Clearing Corporation, a subsidiary of Depository Trust & Clearing Corporation
- First Issues Collectors Club, an international society for collectors of the first postage stamps
- Fédération Internationale de Camping et de Caravanning, an international federation of camping, caravaning and autocaravaning clubs
