= Begonia serotina =

Conservation status
- Endangered (IUCN 3.1)

Scientific classification
- Kingdom: Plantae
- Clade: Embryophytes
- Clade: Tracheophytes
- Clade: Spermatophytes
- Clade: Angiosperms
- Clade: Eudicots
- Clade: Rosids
- Order: Cucurbitales
- Family: Begoniaceae
- Genus: Begonia
- Species: B. serotina

Binomial name
- Begonia serotina A.DC.

Synonyms
- List: Begonia asympeltata L.B.Sm. & Wassh; Begonia parmata Irmsch.

Species of flowering plant

Begonia serotina is a species of plant in the family Begoniaceae. It is endemic to Ecuador. Its natural habitat is subtropical or tropical dry forests. This species is known only from type collection, and is possibly extinct.
