= History of the British Army postal service =

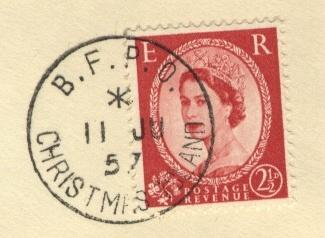
A British Wilding series postage stamp used at a BFPO on Christmas Island in 1957.

The postal service of the British Army is today provided by the British Forces Post Office but its origins may be traced back to Saxon times.

== Origins ==
The origins of the BFPO can be traced back to Saxon times. The Anglo-Saxon Chronicle makes mention of messengers being sent by King Edward the Elder (899–924) to recall members of the Kent fyrd, but it is generally regarded that the origins of the postal services stem from the Kings Messengers (Nuncii et Cursores) of medieval times. In particular the Royal Post established in the reign of King Edward IV (1461–1483) to support his troops engaged in a war against Scotland.

Henry VIII appointed Sir Brian Tuke "Master of Posts" in 1513. Tuke set about formalising the Royal Posts and established regular posting stations between London and Dover. The Royal Posts provided a courier service while Henry was campaigning in France. During the reign of Elizabeth I postal routes were laid for her armies campaigning in Ireland and Scotland. A special postal route was laid to the West Country in 1588 to carry news and intelligence of the expected Spanish Armada.

== Start of the postal service and the English Civil War ==
In 1632, Charles I appointed Thomas Witherings as the Postmaster of foreign mails. Three years later Witherings proposed to Charles's Council to "settle a pacquet post between London and all parts of His Majesty's dominions, for the carrying and recarrying of his subjects letters." To justify the expenditure Witherings suggested that "anie fight at sea, anie distress of His Majestie's ships (which God forbid), anie wrong offered by anie nation to anie of ye coastes of England or anie of His Majestie's forts...the newes will come sooner than thought," implying that the reason for this innovation was to provide better defence of the realm. Two years later a state letter monopoly formally came into being and the public institution of the Post Office was created. It was used to raise revenues to sponsor state activities including war. A public mail service was developed through Witherings' organization, with post offices connected by regular routes built across the nation along the lines of communication utilized by the Tudor troops. A conveyance tariff was fixed. Postage was paid on receipt of the letter by the addressee and remained so until the Rowland Hill reforms of the 1840s.

Both the Royalist and Parliamentarians maintained their own postal systems during the English Civil War (1642–1651). The Parliamentarians appointed Edmund Prideaux as Master of the Posts, Couriers and Messengers. In this capacity he established within the Post Office an instrument of state control, called the 'Secret Office'. This office was charged with gleaning intelligence from intercepted mail. In the Commonwealth period this control was extended nationwide, as soldiers of the New Model Army were appointed Postmasters and were required to submit monthly reports on the activities of the communities that their post office served. Elements of the Secret Office still exist today under the auspices of the Home Office and its secret intelligence services.

The most famous Royalist messenger was James Hicks, a Post Office employee, who passed through the Parliamentarians lines many times but was never caught. The Parliamentarian New Model Army employed its musicians as messengers.

== Bishop Marks – the first postal cancellation stamps ==
In 1660 Colonel Sir Henry Bishop was appointed Postmaster General, he had served as a Royalist officer during the Civil War and was given the "farming" patent of the Post Office as a reward. He instigated the use of a metal stamp which was to be "put upon every letter showing the day of the month that every letter comes to the office, so that no Letter Carryer may dare to detain a letter from post to post, which before was usual". These impressions known as "Bishop Marks" were the first of their kind anywhere in the world and were the fore runner of today's cancellation marks.

== "Common Post" and the War of Spanish Succession ==
English troops were engaged in the War of the Spanish Succession (1701–13) and campaigned under the command of John Churchill, 1st Duke of Marlborough in Europe. Mail was sent by through the Post Office system using the packet boats that sailed between Harwich, England and Dutch port of Hellevoetsluis. On the Continent the military mail was handled by the Thurn & Taxis Post, the postal service of the Holy Roman Empire. This service was referred to as the "Common Post". After the Grand Alliance armies overran Flanders the Dover-Ostend packet service re-opened, for it had been closed at the start of the war because its packet boats were prone to attack from the French.

In addition to the "Common Post" Marlborough used the Queen's Messengers to carry his communications between his Headquarters and the English Court. The Queen's (King's) Messengers were members of the Royal household detailed with the task of carrying despatches on behalf of the Monarch and her/his ministers. They came into existence in the 1640s. They travelled on horseback and used the official Post Office packet services to cross over the Continent. A direct line can be drawn from today's Defence Couriers of the British Army to these Messengers.

== "Armee Britannique" – post mark (1743) ==
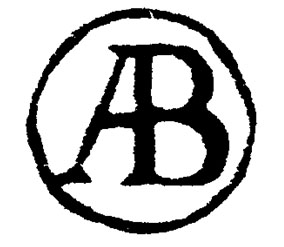
Example of the post mark "AB" (Armee Britannique) used on soldiers' letters in 1743

In 1743 the first distinctive post mark appeared on letters sent by British troops campaigning in Europe. The Thurn & Taxis Post, who processed the mail on behalf of the British army, endorsed it with a small circular stamp inscribed "AB" – Armee Britannique.

Mr Sutton was appointed Postmaster to the Army in 1747, but no more is known of him.

== Mail during the Seven Years' War (1756–63) ==
The Seven Years' War was fought in Europe, North America and India. The postal lines of communication depended upon the Post Office Packet Service. The troops in Europe had their mail conveyed on the packet boats between Harwich and Brielle in Holland. The mail for the troops in North America was carried on the Falmouth, Halifax/New York packet route. The troops involved in the war in India had their mail carried on the East India Company merchant ships.

In North America, the mail was distributed to the troops through the colonial postal system, which was largely developed under the management of Benjamin Franklin. Mail was often carried between the coastal ports of New York, Boston and Halifax by sloops, and a similar practice operated in the West Indies.

== Military postage concessions (1795) ==
In response to the ever-increasing re-direction charges incurred by soldiers posted from one station to another throughout the expanding British Empire an Act of Parliament (1795) was passed to provide cheap postage rates for non-commissioned officers (NCO) and private soldiers or Royal Navy sailors.

This concession allowed soldiers' letters under the weight of 1/4 ounce (7.1 g) to be sent and received for one penny, whilst officers' mail was charged at six pence. To safeguard against abuse it was necessary for a soldier or sailor's name and his regiment or ship to be endorsed on the outside of the letter and to be countersigned by his commanding officer. To prevent the abuse of the concession, further legislation was enacted in 1806 imposing a penalty of £5 or a term of imprisonment for any abuser. It came to light that officers were handing their personal letters to their soldiers/sailors, who then signed their names on the covers and presented them as their own to their commanding officer for counter-signature.

== Henry Darlot – The Duke of York's Army Postmaster ==
In the summer of 1799 Prince Frederick, Duke of York and Albany (1763–1827), as Commander-in-Chief of the army, wrote to the Postmaster General (Lord Auckland) to request that "a good intelligent clerk" who could "facilitate delivery and to collect letters and protect revenue" be seconded from the General Post Office as the Army Postmaster to an amphibious expedition to Den Helder, Holland.

Henry Darlot, a clerk from the Post Office Foreign Section, was chosen as the Army Postmaster, the first to officially accompany the Army overseas. Mail for the Army was handed to the Post Office Foreign Section, sealed in bags and passed to ships sailing to Holland. The Army established a base at Den Helder. When Henry Darlot arrived with his servant, he found that two despatches of mails had already preceded him. The result was chaos. He reported to the Post Office Secretary's Office on 27 September 1799 that:

the mails are both delivered which I assure you is not so easy or businesslike as I imagined it would be, for although the letters are partly sorted in London to the different regiments, there are still a great number for persons not attached to any regiment who are so impatient to be supplied that immediately a mail arrives I am beset by at least a hundred of them. Great confusion is occasioned also by officers detached from the regiment to which their letters were addressed insisting on looking for them before the Drum Majors [who were appointed Post Orderlies for each regiment] get them.

The military campaign was a failure and Henry Darlot lost his horse and much of his equipment in the retreat to the coast. On his return to London, he was commended for having carried out his task "with ability and propriety to the entire satisfaction of the Postmaster-General. " In the two months he was in Holland his Army Post Office made an overall profit of £643 6s 6d. (The postage rates were 1d for soldiers and 6d for officers).

== Peninsular War – postal arrangements (1809–1813) ==
Despite Henry Darlot's successful attachment to the army, no Post Office official was sent to provide a postal service to the British forces during the Peninsular War. Mail was sent by regular weekly packet service from Falmouth, Cornwall to Lisbon (Portugal). This civilian service was established in 1703.

The mails were received by the British Post Office Agent, Thomas Reynolds, who passed it onto the Quartermaster General's Headquarters in Lisbon. Where the Sergeant Postmaster, Sergeant R Webb (3rd Foot Guards), who had been appointed by the Commander-in-Chief, Arthur Wellesley, 1st Duke of Wellington (1769–1852) in April 1809, sorted and arranged the distribution of the mail. The transit time from London to the field was 13–20 days. Return post left Lisbon for Falmouth, three days a week. There was no censorship of mail. The military mail service was augmented through the use of the Spanish civilian postal service.

When the army advanced into Spain, at the end of 1811, Major George Scovell was appointed Superintendent of Military Communications responsible for all army communications. As part of his re-organisation of the postal and courier service he detailed the cavalry to escort mail. He also ordered that "bags containing letters sent to different Divisions of the Army must be returned to Headquarters at the first opportunity. The wet bags cause the loss of many letters on the road."

After the battle of Vittoria (21 June 1813), Wellington began to close up on the Pyrenees, thus extending his line of communications. This affected the mail service and the postal operations were moved from Lisbon to the port of Pasajes (east of San Sebastian), the British Post Office Agent there was Charles Sevright, who had spent ten years as a Prisoner of War after his arrest in Holland on spying charges.

In February 1814, the mail service was experiencing some problems again. Wellington became dissatisfied and rebuked Lieutenant-Colonel Sturgeon, who took it very much to heart and deliberately rode too close to the enemy lines at Vic en Bigorre (France) and was shot in the head. The post of Superintendent of Military Communications was taken over by Lieutenant-Colonel Colquhoun Grant.

The Army crossed the Pyrenees in June 1814 and Charles Sevright, moved the postal facility to Bordeaux (France) where it remained in operation until the last of Wellington's army had embarked and sailed for England.

== Waterloo Campaign (1815) ==
Wellington on assuming command of the Allied Armies on 5 April 1815 had to create a command structure. In this structure he recalled now Lieutenant-Colonel Sir George Scovell as Superintendent of Military Communications.

An Army Post Office was set up in the Headquarters in Brussels with two clerks. Mails were despatched to and from the headquarters via Ostend (Belgium) where the British Post Office Agent was Charles Sevright. Army Post Offices operated in France until the withdrawal of British troops in 1817.

== Military influence on Rowland Hill's postal reforms 1840 ==
In 1840, Rowland Hill (1795–1879) began his reforms of the Post Office. An important part of these reforms was the introduction of a uniform postage rate (i.e. 1d – which could be prepaid using the now famous "Penny Black" stamp), this concept was greatly influenced by the reduced postage rate concessions granted to the Army in 1795.

Several Army officers were called to give evidence at a Parliamentary board of enquiry. One such officer was Captain J Bentham of the 52nd Regiment. He was asked if he had observed the importance of correspondence to the soldiers, he replied: "I have observed that they take very great advantage of it and they appear to derive great gratification from it, and it benefits them in a variety of ways..." He also expressed the opinion that higher rates of postage would lead to a total prohibition of the use of the mail service by "the humbler classes". He was then questioned as to the level of literacy in the Army he responded: "I believe that many of them learnt to write expressly for the purpose of writing their own letters."

== Crimean War – postal services (1854–1856) ==
In March 1854 British troops together with an expeditionary force from France were sent to Turkey and the Crimea in support of the Turks against the Russians.

Initially it was decided that the normal civilian postal service to Turkey and the Black Sea was sufficient and therefore no British Post Office representative was sent to handle the Army's mails. Mail was despatched from London via the French overland route and onto Constantinople (now Istanbul). There it was handed to the French Consular Postal Service who in turn, passed it to the French Army Post Office for distribution to the British Army.

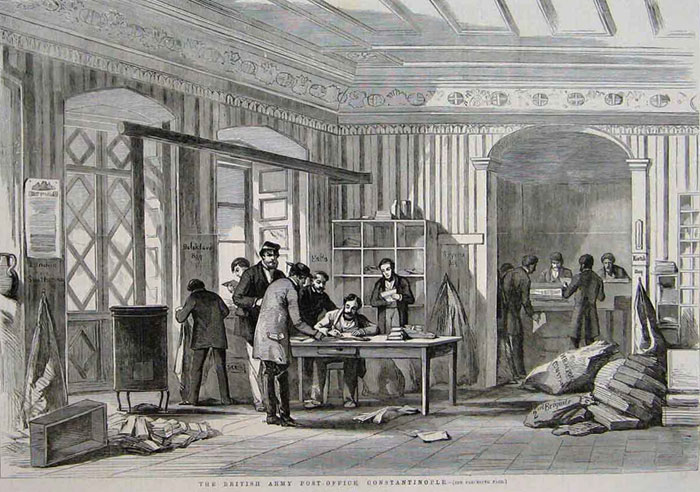
British Army Post Office, Constantinople (1855)

Mail from the British Army was despatched on the French packets from Constantinople to Malta. At Malta it was transferred via the British Post Office agent onto vessels bound for Southampton. The outbound system from Britain proved to be both expensive and inadequate. William Howard Russell, The Times correspondent reported:

There is always something wrong about our letters. At present the French Post Office here is a receptacle of several hundred letters addressed to the generals, staff officers and officers of every Regiment which the [French] postmaster refuses to give up until some chivalrous person pays £12 (300 francs) for the whole bundle and to take the chance of being repaid by the various persons ... to whom they are addressed.

Further evidence of the problem is illustrated by an officer in the Rifle Brigade, Henry Hugh Clifford, who later won a VC at Inkerman. He wrote in a letter home:

I have just received your letter. It was left here in the French Post Office with 12 letters for me, they not having the three Queen's Heads [reference to a 1d stamp] requisite upon them. For the last 3 months I have not heard from England ...

By May 1854, a new deal over the transit cost was struck with the French postal authorities and this partly solved the problem of holding unpaid mail. Mail was despatched from Britain as before but on its arrival in Constantinople British officers handled it, but unfortunately they had no experience in postal matters and there was soon a buildup of undelivered letters.

In the meantime, the Secretary of State for War had received many letters of complaint and took the matter up with the Postmaster General (Charles Canning, 1st Earl Canning). He was informed by the Postmaster General that:

with view to relieving the Officers of HM forces in Turkey from the irksome business of superintending the arrangement and distribution of the large mass of correspondence of which mails between this country and the Army are likely to be composed, the Postmaster General has determined upon dispatching an intelligent and experienced Officer of this Department to act as Army Postmaster.

Edward Smith, of the Post Office Inland Letter Section, was appointed as the Army Postmaster, and left London in June 1854 with an Assistant Army Postmaster, Thomas Angell. On their arrival they set up a Base Army Post Office in Constantinople.

One of their first tasks was to recover the unpaid mails from the French. This they achieved by using their own money as well as borrowing £50 from the Commander-in-Chief, Lord Raglan (1788–1855). A month later the Assistant Army Postmaster, Thomas Angell set up an Army Post Office in Varna in support of the Army Headquarters.

A regular seaborne mail service was established between Varna and Constantinople. In late summer, an invasion fleet of some 600 ships and 50,00 men gathered at Varna creating a shortage of accommodation which prompted the Assistant Army Postmaster to obtain Lord Raglan's permission to operate from the ship Ganges, but the ship sailed for the Crimea before the Assistant Army Postmaster had moved on board. So he established the Army Post Office on the Sovereign which was smaller. This caused him sorting difficulties as his report reflects:

Scarcely had the sorting operation commenced (by making use of buckets for letter boxes) when a perfect rush was made aboard, officers, non-commissioned officers and privates came to demand the letters and papers for their respective regiments, it was in vain that I endeavoured to interpose a barrier to enable me to continue the sorting unmolested ... [because of the confusion caused he sorted through the night] ... On the following morning, at five o'clock, I signalled "Send for letters", but the order being given shortly after for the whole fleet to weigh anchor I was unable to dispose of them.

The force landed at Eupatoria on 14 September 1854, the army disembarked and marched to Balaklava. On the instructions of Headquarters Smith and Angell switched places. The Adjutant General, General Estcourt instructed that the mails should be organised as follows:

When a mail arrives you [Smith] should as speedily as possible inform me of it and name an hour either that day or the next for the delivery of letters at the Headquarters Encampment ... When a mail is to be dispatched you should in like manner inform me when you will collect letters at the Headquarters Encampment and carry them off with you to the vessel which is to carry them away...

The provision of a proper mail service was hampered by a lack of suitable labour, shipping movement details, dedicated transport and inappropriate accommodation. Matters came to a head when the following report appeared in the Daily News dated 13 January 1855 (Balaklava):

Whenever complaints become inconveniently local, the London Post Office is in the habit of requesting the Postmaster here the state of the case. Such a demand is unfair and unreasonable. A little candour and common sense properly applied would make the Post Office authorities understand that nothing short of confusion can be expected from a Department which as the Post Office to the Forces, is sent out in a pitiful state of hopelessness, with a heavy load of responsibility and with no adequate means of labour resources and powers...

The article then went on to mention the use of soldiers to assist at the Army Post Office:

A close and patient enquiry into the details of the Army Post Office has convinced me that not the slightest blame attaches to the two Postmasters Smith and Angell, who are merely victims of circumstances. If these gentlemen have committed a fault it is that they did not ruin their prospects in the service to which they belonged by refusing to take upon themselves the responsibility for the mismanagement of others. Instead of detaching the Army Post Office with a sufficient number of clerks and with a couple of carts, drivers and horses for the conveyance of mails they were referred to Naval agents and the superciliousness of young gentlemen attached to the Staff.

Soon after the publication of this news article two more Assistant Army Postmasters, Mr Sissons and Henry Mellersh, plus seven sorters were despatched from London. They arrived in Constantinople on 5 February 1855. Mr Mellersh was to play a significant part in the establishment of a dedicated Army Postal Service, as he was to become a member of a joint War Office and Post Office committee set up in 1876 to investigate the viability of such post service. He was the only member on the committee who had first hand experience of providing a mail service under war conditions. A further Army Post Office was established at Scutari, to provide postal services to the Barrack Hospital staff and patients.

=== First international money order service (1854) ===
In response to demands made by Florence Nightingale, a method of transmitting money was devised to allow troops to transfer monies back to their families at home in the United Kingdom. This was designed to prevent drunkenness and became the world's first International Money Order Service. In its first month of operation £7,000 was remitted by the British troops.

Afterwards Malta and Gibraltar were allowed to send, but not to receive orders. By the end of the decade Canada started to send and receive them and the rest of the dominions and colonies of the British Empire gradually followed. In 1869, money orders began to be exchanged with foreign countries, the first two being Switzerland and Belgium. In 1883 they were supplemented by the Postal Order. Peace was declared on 30 March 1856. The Army post Offices in Varna, Scutari and Balaklava were closed, while the Base Army Post Office in Constantinople remained opened and became the centre of the British postal service in the Levant until the outbreak of World War I.

Shortly after the outbreak of the Crimean War in 1854 a branch of the British Army Post Office was established in Constantinople as a sorting and forwarding station for the vast numbers of letters passing to and from the various units of the British forces in the Crimea, as well as those of the Turkish contingent. Sub-offices were in operation in the Crimea and Scutari. This was the first office outside the United Kingdom to make use of British postage stamps, which were issued there about November 1854. Mail which originated, or passed through Constantinople, were cancelled with the "Crown in Stars" or the "O*O" cancels.

== 1877 War Office – Postal (du Plat Tayor) Committee ==
The military postal experience of the Crimea and the lessons learnt from the Indian Army encouraged the British Army to seriously review the arrangements for the provision of a postal service to the troops in the field. There were two opinions; firstly, that the Army run its own services as in the Peninsular War. Secondly, that civilians from the Post Office be responsible for the service as in the Crimean and Indian Army example.

The Secretary for War wrote to the Postmaster-General in 1876, with a proposal to form a force of volunteers to run the Army's postal services. The Postmaster-General put the proposal to the commanding officer of the 49th Middlesex Rifle Volunteers, Lieutenant Colonel John Lowther du Plat Taylor, who was an ex-Private Secretary to the Postmaster-General.

A committee was formed, with terms of reference "to consider the formation of a Corps for the performance of Postal Duties in the Field." It assembled at the War Office and the Committee consisted of:

- Lieutenant Colonel John Lowther du Plat Taylor
- Major CE Webber RE (a RE telegraphist, who had experience of working with the GPO)
- Captain AC Hamilton RE (Secretary)
- Major WF Butler RA (Deputy Assistant Quartermaster General)
- Mr RS Culey (GPO) and
- Henry Mellersh (an Assistance Army Postmaster during the Crimean War)

The committee submitted its final report to both the War Office and Postmaster General on 28 February 1877. The report contained the following recommendations:

1. A corps should be organised in peace, made up often in the employment of the Post Office and be formed into a company within 49th Middlesex Rifle Volunteers.
2. In war, postal companies should provide post offices in the field.
3. An Army Postmaster who would receive his orders from the Chief of Staff or the officer in charge of communications would command the Post Office company.
4. Mails should be sorted into Regiments in London or at the Base of the operations.
5. Letters from England to Armies in the field should be charged such extra postage as would enable homeward letters to be forwarded free of charge.
6. A money order and register letter service should be provided.
7. The Army Service Corps should in all cases provide transport.

Nothing came of these recommendations and they were shelved until 1882, in spite of du Plat Taylor's efforts to resurrect the idea in 1879. When he brought to the attention of the War Office the poor mail arrangements reported in The Times during the second Afghan War (1878–80).

== The Volunteer Movement and formation of Army Post Office Corps (1868–1882) ==
On 12 May 1859 the Government authorised the Lords Lieutenant to raise volunteer corps under the Yeomanry and Volunteer Consolidation Act (1804) in response to belligerent overtures towards expressed by the French against the British. Volunteers were asked to form rifle regiments in defence of the country. (see Volunteer Movement) Employees from the General Post Office volunteered to join the 21st Middlesex Rifles Volunteers (Civil Service Rifles) and formed a company under the command of Captain John Lowther du Plat Taylor. In 1868 du Plat Taylor resigned from the 21st and formed the 49th Middlesex Rifle Volunteers recruited entirely from Post Offices volunteers. Under the Cardwell Reforms the regiment was redesignated 24th Middlesex Rifles Volunteers (Post Office Rifles) in 1880.

In 1881 a rebellion broke out in Egypt which threatened Britain's passage to India through Suez. In response an expeditionary force under Sir Garnet Wolseley was despatched to quell it. This gave Lieutenant Colonel du Plat Taylor the opportunity to raise the matter of the postal corps again and it was agreed that an Army Post Office Corps (APOC) should be formed. Queen Victoria issued a Royal Warrant to that effect on 22 July 1882. The recruits were drawn from the GPO employees serving with the 24th Middlesex Rifle Volunteers.

== Army Post Office Corps – Egypt Expedition 1882 ==
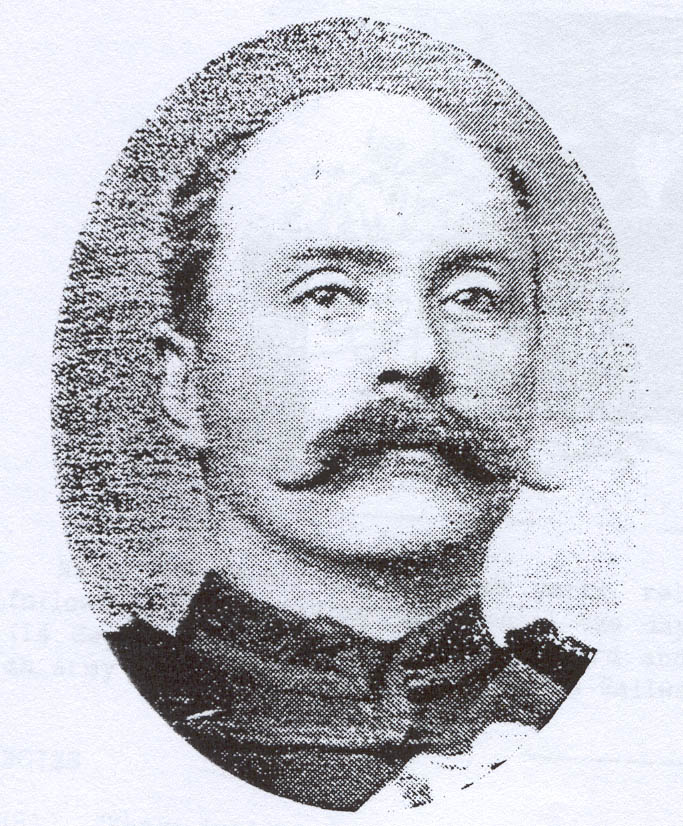
Major George Charles Sturgeon, Army Post Office Corps

On 8 August 1882 the new Corps under the command of Major Sturgeon (Army Postmaster) embarked aboard the Black Prince on its first overseas expedition, only 17 days after its formation, and landed at Alexandra on 19 August.

Mails from Britain were despatched 3 times a week via the 'overland route' through France to Alexandria. The Army Post Offices offered a letter and parcel service and sold stamps and postal orders. In addition to the mail services, a free parcel service from the Naval docks at Deptford was also set up. These parcels travelled by Government store ships and transports. This service was the forerunner of the Military Forwarding Office (MFO) service which still exists today.

Stationary Army Post Offices were established at Alexandria, Ramleh, Cairo, Port Said and Ismaila, while mobile Field Post Offices were attached to the divisional headquarters and moved when they moved. On 9 September, during the battle of Kassassin, the Army Post Office, under the charge of Sergeant FJ Inwood, attached to HQ 2 Division came under fire, but no one was injured, nevertheless the incident resulted in Inwood and his men becoming the first volunteers to see shots fired in anger.

Private HF Yardley was mentioned in despatches as was Corporal WT Marchant. Major Sturgeon reported to the General of Communications, as would his successors. He sent telegraph reports of troop movements to assist with the sorting of mail in London. This practice was to be continued and indeed is still done to this day, in particular, tracking the movements of HM ships.

The Expedition was a success. The unit received high praise from the Commander-in-Chief, who wrote:

The formation of a purely military postal department has been a tried for the first time in this war. It has been very successful ... I have much pleasure in bringing to the notice of the Secretary of State the admirable manner in which the Post Office Corps discharged its duties in Egyp t... Their services have been so valuable that I hope a similar corps may be employed on any future occasion...

That occasion came in 1885 when the Army Post Office Corps accompanied General Wolseley's expedition to relieve General Gordon in Khartoum.

== Army Post Office Corps – Sudan Expedition and the Relief of General Gordon 1885 ==
The Army Post Office Corps under the command of Major Sturgeon was despatched to Suakin in support of the expeditionary force raised to relieve General Gordon in Khartoum. They landed at Suakin on 27 March 1885 and established the Base Army Post Office there. Further Field Post Offices were opened at Quarantine Island, the railway terminus and one each with the Headquarters and 2nd Brigade.

The mails travelled the same routes as for the Egyptian Campaign of 1882. A daily mail service between Suakin, the Headquarters, Handub and Otao was arranged. Every morning a messenger travelled by train to Houdoub with the mail. The railway was constructed by Kitchener's 'Band of Boys' a member of which, was Lieutenant M Nathan RE, who was to become the Secretary to the Post Office in 1910. 'The Band of Boys' was the nickname given by the army to the young Royal Engineers officers in the Sudan who built Kitchener's 'impossible' desert railway in 1897.

The Director of Army Telegraphs for the Expedition was Major CE Webber RE, who had been an original member of du Plat Taylor's 1877 Committee. The Field Post Offices offered letter and parcel services, sold stamps and postal orders. Major Sturgeon introduced the sale of embossed envelopes with a sheet of note paper at 1d or two at 1d. This was the first recorded time that stationery had been sold at Army Post Offices, and can be regarded as the forerunner to the Field Service Post Card (Army Form A2042) used in the First World War. This additional service produced a revenue of £60 7s 6d.

The mail service was again a success as testified by Lieutenant G Parry of 12 Company Commissariat and Transport Corps who recorded

I have never mentioned anything about our postal arrangements. We used to get our letters very regularly, considering all things, and though some necessarily never reached us, there was nothing to complain about. They only took ten days coming all the way from London, overland, via Brindisi, Alexandria, Cairo and Suez, where a steamer of one sort or another met the mails and ran then down to Suakin... When the detachment of the Post-office Volunteers arrived, everything was very well managed...

The Army Postal service closed on 30 May 1885 after which the Indian Field Post Office in Suakin served the remaining troops. The services of Army Post Office Corps was not called upon again until the Anglo-Boer War. Three years after the Army Post Office Corps' men returned to Great Britain, an Army Post Office Corps Field Manual (1888) was issued.

== Army Post Office Corps – Anglo-Boer War (1899–1902) ==
On the outbreak of war, the Army Post Office Corps (M Company 24th Middlesex Volunteers) under the command of Major Treble, who was appointed as Army Postmaster, were mobilised and set sail for Cape Town on 14 September 1899 aboard the RMS Dunottar Castle. On arrival in Cape Town the Base Army Post Office was established in the newly built Cape Town Post Office building.

The original plan was that the Army Post Office Corps staff be deployed at the Base Army Post Office in Cape Town and establish Field Post Offices along the Lines of communication (LofC), however, this did not materialise because General Buller, the Commander in Chief, decided to adopt a two pronged attack; one from Cape Province, the other from Natal. Therefore, the resources of the service had to be split to support the two prongs and a second Base Army Post Office responsible for servicing the troops in Natal was established at Pietermaritzburg.

Mails were sent weekly from Britain to Cape Town. The transit time was 14 days. Once in Cape Town the mails were resorted and forwarded to the Field Post Offices attached to formations in the field via the civilian postal services. Mails for the Natal Field Force were sent to East London and hence by a small steamer to Durban and by rail to Pietermaritzburg. This service was disrupted by the Boers advance into Natal and down to Stormberg.

During the sieges of Ladysmith, Mafeking and Kimberley, mail addressed to the troops contained in the besieged towns mounted up and could not be distributed to the addressees until after the sieges had been broken.

The re-organisation of troops and the subsequent renumbering of units for the different phases of the war caused sortation and location difficulties. However, the Army Post Office Corps devised a location method (which is still used today) and became invaluable to both the postal services as well as the Headquarters. Due to indifference by units there were difficulties in handling casualties' mail as a letter to the Press bears out:

When General Methuen's column was camped at Jacobsdal, ... one of our Company [Imperial Yeomanry] walked over the site, picked up a mail bag containing a good many letters, so he shouldered the bag and ran to give it to the departing Regiment. The only remark they made was 'Oh, they are only letters for the men away sick.

To solve this problem civilians were employed to maintain lists of military hospital patients so that mail could be extracted for them at the Base Army Post Offices.

During the invasion phase of the war, in accordance with orders from Lord Kitchener's instructions mail from the Base Army Post Offices was forwarded to troops through the rail network, it accumulated at stations awaiting onward carriage.

This practice was the result of an unfortunate incident at Roodewal Station. Lieutenant Preece APOC and seventeen Army Post Office Corps soldiers were at the station when the Boers under General De Wet attacked it on 7 June 1900. The 2000 mail bags on site along with stores were used to build ramparts in defence of the station. After six hours of bitter fighting and the death of the station commander, Captain Gale – Railway Pioneer Corps, the defenders were forced to surrender to General De Wet. During the fighting Private Tuffin and Goble of the Army Post Office Corps were killed and the remaining APOC men were taken prisoner.

After the surrender the mail bags were looted by the Boers. Stock (postage stamps, postal orders etc. ) valued at £5099 0s 41/2d were stolen. Sergeant Chapman APOC reported the aftermath of the action as follows:

The Boers on their arrival began to loot. Everything was taken, the mail bags giving them excellent opportunities ... I made an attempt to save loose cash in my till when I was interrupted by a Boer coming into the room. I made the pretence of looking for some papers and closed the box ... A grave had to be dug for poor Tuffin and the last rites performed over our late comrade. Mr Preece read the burial service and before the grave was covered in, the order was given to get kits together and fall in. We were immediately marched off to the Boer laager ... The work of destruction on the Station then commenced. The Station-Master was apparently in league with the enemy as they allowed him to take all his furniture etc to a place of safety on the veldt before starting to blow up the place ... On the following day we were marched off pass Rhenoster [the scene of the Derby's disaster] to a position on De Wet's farm a distance of 9 miles. We stayed in this place for the night and the following day 9 June Mr Preece was taken suddenly ill and was removed to the Yeomanry Hospital. I had hopes of being taken also but no opportunity occurred (there being no transport) so I had to trudge on with the others for about 8 miles the next day...

Chapman was finally released in Kroonstad on 25 June after being held captive for 17 days. The others were released in August 1900. As late as 1909 attempts were made in Britain to cash postal orders looted from the station and when De Wet's house was search in 1914 over 3,000 unused British stamps, souvenirs of the attack, were found there.

By August 1900 the war moved from a fluid one to garrisoning the territory that had been gained. Consequently, the Field Post Offices were converted into Stationary Army Post Offices and were issued with a new series of date stamps, which included the name of the town where the office was based. To service these Stationary Offices, five Travelling Post Offices (TPO – Post Offices operating from a railway carriage) were set up and were operated by the APOC. The TPO vans were improvised from large box trucks fitted out with sorting frames, tables etc. by the Royal Engineers.

Working the TPOs could be dangerous as an APOC sergeant's report of 19 June 1901 illustrates:

... after leaving Machavie en route for Kokemoer and Klerkdrop [on a branch line running out of and to the west of Johannesburg], the mail train was derailed and attacked by the Boers. It occurred at about 3.45 p.m. Immediately the train was at a standstill, it was riddled from end to end with bullets ... before I could realise my position, I was surrounded by Boers some pointing their Mausers at me ... By the time I got to the counter everything was removed. Two Boers were filling their pockets with registered letters. I was ordered out of the coach...

By the end of the war the Army Post Office Corps was providing the mail service to both military and civilians alike in the Transvaal and Orange River Colony. To ensure the continuity of this postal service to the civilian population, personnel of the Army Post Office Corps were transferred to the colonial Post Office and remained in South Africa.

When the war began 111 all ranks of the Army Post Office Corps were deployed. At the end of the war there were 400 Army Post Office Corps soldiers deployed. During the war about 500,000 letters and newspapers and 12,000 parcels were delivered to the troops each week. £2 million of postal orders and £110,000 of stamps were sold. They also assisted in the handling of mails for the troops from Australia, Canada, India and New Zealand.

In October 1902 the last Army Post Office was closed, but it was not until February 1903 that the last detachment of the Army Post Office Corps left South Africa. After the Army Post Office Corps returned to Britain, its staff returned to their peacetime duties with the GPO. They kept up their military skills by participating in army manoeuvers every September from 1903 to 1913.

== Inter-departmental Committee on Postal and Telegraph Services (1908–11) ==
The Territorial and Reserve Forces Act (1907) obliged the GPO, as the largest employer in Britain, to provide extra postal detachments for the newly created Territorial Divisions. This was in addition to the four other army units already recruited from the GPO. These, with their commitments to the Royal Naval Reserve, had obvious staffing implications, which if not correctly managed could adversely impact on the civilian postal services. To address this situation the GPO called a meeting with War Office "to consider and report as to the relations between the postal and telegraph services and the Army; and as to the organisations already in existence or proposed for giving effect to those relations."

An Inter-departmental Committee on Postal and Telegraph Services consisting of members of the War Office, Royal Engineers Telegraph Reserve and Lt Col William Price CMG, who had served as an officer with the Army Post Office Corps during the Anglo-Boer War, among others was formed in November 1908. An interim report was submitted to the War Office and Postmaster General in April 1909 and the final report was issued, two years later, on Wednesday, 5 April 1911.

In the final report, the Committee expressed the opinion that it was important that "the Postal Corps and the Army Signal Service should co-operate" and that they should be "placed on a common basis". The report went on to say that because the "Army Signal Service was a branch of the Corps of Royal Engineers" it therefore follows that the Postal Service should also serve under the aegis of the same Corps. Their reasons for this conjugation were:

1. That in the field, economy and efficiency in dealing with correspondence would be increased, because of the synergies created through mutual assistance and co- operation between the two services. The movement of messages is not the exclusion of the Army Signal Service.
2. That in both war and peace administration would be simplified. It would also facilitate an easier transfer of personnel from one branch to another, as well as helping the GPO to control and maintain enlistment to the services.
3. That it would allow personnel of both services to have the same conditions of enlistment, service and rates of pay. This would assist in recruitment as well as preventing jealously and friction between the services. In the past the difference in pay between the telegraph reservists and the Army Post Office Corps had caused dissatisfaction.

== Formation of the Royal Engineers (Postal Section) and (Army Postal Services) 1913 ==
On 28 February 1913, forty-six years to the day after the first recommendation to establish a military postal unit, the Army Post Office Corps and proposed Territorial Army Postal Service joining the Royal Engineers' Telegraphists when they were formed into the Royal Engineers, Special Reserve (Postal Section) and the Royal Engineers, Territorial Force (Army Postal Services) respectively. The first Director Army Postal Service (DAPS) was Lt Col W Price CMG.

The Army Post Office Corps was subsumed into the Royal Engineers because of the Engineers' interest in electric telegraph systems. An affiliation between the Royal Engineers and GPO had been formed in 1870 as a means of training members of the Corps in telegraphic skills. In 1884 the 24th Middlesex Rifle Volunteer Corps (The Post Office Rifles) provided the manpower to form the Army Telegraph Corps which in 1885 was re-designated the Telegraph Reserve RE, both the APOC and Telegraph Reserve RE were manned, trained and administered by the Post Office Rifles until 1913.

== Royal Engineers (Postal Section) – First World War (1914–1918) ==
=== Overview ===
The First World War mail services to the British Army and later the Royal Air Force (RAF) were provided by the Royal Engineers (Postal Section) (RE (PS)). The Field Service Regulations (FSR), Part 2 published in 1909, referred to the service as the Army Postal Service (APS). The FSR chapter covering the function of the APS was written, at the request of the War Office, by Lt Col (later Brig-Gen) W. Price CMG, who was the Director Army Postal Service (DAPS) throughout the war.

The RE (PS) operated in all theatres of war and where expedient their service was dovetailed into the services of the Dominion troops (principally Australian, Canadian, Indian and New Zealand army postal services).

Staffing – Members of the RE (PS) were almost exclusively recruited from the General Post Office (GPO) and at the start of the war had an establishment of 10 officers and 280 other ranks, by the end of the war the establishment was approx. 7,000 all ranks. From May 1917 members of Women's Army Auxiliary Corps (WAAC) were employed at the Base Army Post Offices (BAPO) and the stationary Army Post Offices (APO) located on the Western Front were also wholly recruited from among the GPO staff.

Mail circulation – Generally, mail (letters and parcels) posted in the UK addressed to troops overseas was circulated by the GPO to the Home Postal Depot (HPD) in London where it was sorted by theatre and unit. It was then despatched to embarkation ports and loaded on vessels for transportation to the theatre's BAPO. At the BAPO the mail was sorted and loaded onto supply trains for transportation to the railhead. At the railhead the mail guard, who had accompanied the mail from the BAPO, and members of the railhead APO transferred the mails to the supply column (usually lorries) for the journey to the Refilling Points where the attached Field Post Office (FPO) staff would receive the mail and then distribute it the Unit Post Orderlies (UPOs) who had travelled to the Refilling Point on regimental transport. Homeward bound mail was sent in the reverse direction back to the BAPO, which would be responsible for loading it onto vessels bound for the UK. On the mail's arrival in the UK it was put into the GPO system for delivery to the addressee.

Functions – The Base Army Post Office (BAPO) was the principal in-theatre sorting office for all postal matter passing between the forces' postal service, HPD and other postal administrations. It also carried out the ancillary postal administrative functions required to maintain the postal service in the field. BAPOs were deployed as follows:

Formation	BAPO	Location	Operational dates	Notes
British Expeditionary Force (BEF)	1	Le Havre, France	17 Aug – 1 Sep 1914 and Oct 1914 – Aug 1919	British force deployed in support of France and Belgium
BEF	1	Nantes, France	6–27 Sep 1914	Temporary deployment during retreat from Mons
BEF	2	Rouen, France	Aug 1914 – Jul 1915	After Jul 1915 became a Canadian BAPO
BEF	3	Boulogne, France	Jan 1915 – Mar 1919	Opened to improve transit time of mails through the Folkestone-Boulogne packet route.
BEF	4	Calais, France	Jun 1915 – Mar 1919	Opened to service the BEF Northern Army.
Salonika Force	X	Salonika, Greece	Nov 1915 – Sep 1919	~
British Adriatic Mission	W	Brindisi, Italy	Feb 1916 – Apr 1916	British mission in support of the Serbian army
Ireland Garrison	HD/D16	Dublin, Ireland	May 1916 – Aug 1916	Easter Rising (24–29 April 1916)
Italian Expeditionary Force	S101/L1	Arquata, Italy	Nov 1917 – Mar 1920	British force in support of the Italian army
Egyptian Expeditionary Force (EEF)	Z	Alexandria, Egypt	5 Apr 1915 – Dec 1919	~
Gallipoli Expedition	Y	Mudros, Lemos, Greece	Apr 1915 – Feb 1916	~
EEF	T	Port Said, Egypt	Jan 1916 – Feb 1920	~
EEF	K	Kantara, Egypt	Jan 1918 – Mar 1920	~
North Russian Expeditionary Force (NREF)	PB1	Murmansk, Russia	Sep 1918 – Sep 1919	British force deployed in support of White Russians
NREF	PB2	Archangel, Russia	Oct 1918 – Sep 1919	~
Occupation of Turkey (Ottoman Empire)	Y	Constantinople, Turkey	Nov 1918 – Sep 1920	~

Army Post Offices (APO) were stationary offices usually located on the lines of communications and rear areas. Field Post Offices (FPO) were located with the forward units and were mobile. Army/Field Post Office accepted, despatched and distributed mail as well as sell stamps, postal orders and later War Bonds. They also encashed postal orders and handled registered mail.

=== Home Postal Depot (1914–1920) ===
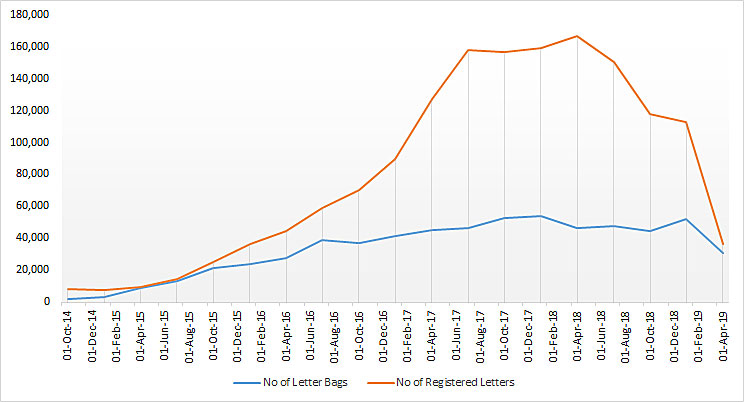
Fig 1 - A graph showing weekly processing of mail bags and registered letters through the Home Postal Depot RE 1914–1919

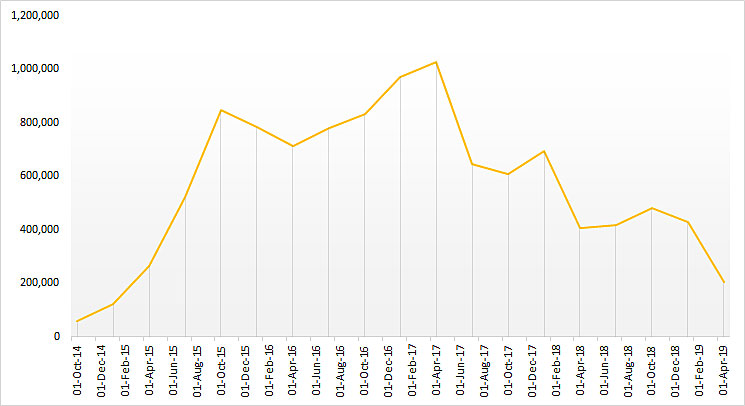
Fig 2 - A graph showing weekly processing of parcels through the Home Postal Depot RE 1914–1919

The Home Postal Depot (HPD) was formed on 10 August 1914, but on a very ad-hoc basis, under the administration of the GPO. A letter sorting office (Army Letter Office 1 – ALO1) and a parcel office were established in the GPO King Edward Building, London. It soon became apparent that the facilities were inadequate to cope with the volumes of mail being sent to the British Expeditionary Force (BEF) in France.

Early 1915 the HPD was re-organised and came under the direct management of the RE (PS). Maj C. A. Wheeler RE was appointed the Officer Commanding in February. A second ALO (ALO 2) was opened in GPO Mount Pleasant and the parcel office was also moved there. As the BEF grew larger and new fronts were opened in the Middle East so the volume of mail grew.

Late in 1916 the HPD moved to a purpose-built wooden building (200,000 sq ft) on Chester Road, Regent's Park. This new facility contained the HPD administration offices, a large parcel office and ALO2 both of which moved from GPO Mount Pleasant. ALO2 was responsible for the processing of mails to all theatres except BEF. ALO 1 (handling the BEF mails) remained in GPO King Edward Building for the duration of the war.

A Dominions Army Letter Office (DALO), tasked with handling Australian and New Zealand troops mail, opened in the space vacated by the ALO2 on its move to Regent's Park. The DALO closed in March 1919.

King George V and Queen Mary visited HPD at Regent's Park on 11 December 1916 and on 1 August 1918 they visited ALO 1 in the King Edward Building.

The staff work that brought about the re-organisation of the HPD and its move to Regent's Park was largely executed by a Principal Clerk in the GPO Secretariat, Fredric Williamson. He was commissioned into the RE (PS) as Lieutenant Colonel in May 1915 and appointed Director Army Postal Services (Home). In May 1915 he took over responsibility for the mail services to the theatres outside the BEF.

Volumes of letter mails continued to grow (see Fig 1) so in 1917 it was deemed appropriate to outsource some of the work to provincial offices (Birmingham, Bristol, Glasgow, Leeds, Manchester and Sheffield). These offices sent despatches direct to the BAPOs. In the same year the German U-boat campaign against the British merchant marine was successfully limiting supply of goods and materials to the UK and this was reflected in the decline in the number of parcels being sent to troops overseas (see Fig 2), which reached a peak of over 1 million in April 1917 but dropped to 400,000 by April 1918 (rationing was introduced in January 1918).

The transport requirements of the Depot were met at first by the London Postal Service through the existing Civil Post Office contract but owing to labour shortages in the autumn of 1915 the contractor could no longer carry on. The War Office then agreed to attach the 620th Company Army Service Corps (M.T.) to the Depot for the duration. Such was the demand that at one time the company had an establishment of 500 men and 220 three-ton lorries.

=== British Expeditionary Force – France, Belgium (1914–1918) ===
==== 1914 ====
Lt Col W Price CMG RE received the APS mobilization orders in late July 1914. The advance parties of the Base Army Post Office (BAPO) and Advanced Base Army Post Office departed for France on 11 August whilst the remaining personnel left the UK on 14 August.

The BAPO was established at Le Havre and the Advanced BAPO, which also operated as a concentration office for cross-post, was set up at Amiens. Additionally two stationary APOs were established; one in Boulogne the other in Rouen. Field Post Offices (FPOs) in support of the front line formations were instituted at GHQ, Corps HQs and the Corps, divisional and brigade rail/road heads – mainly concentrated in the neighbourhood of Maubeuge, Cambrai, Saint-Quentin and Le Cateau (GHQ). UK bound mails were accepted at the FPOs from 15 August onwards.

During the Retreat from Mons (24 August – 4 September) the FPOs moved back with their respective formations. When the German's push to Paris threatened the British lines of communication the Advance BAPO at Amiens moved westward to Rouen (27 August) then to Le Mans (31 August) then to Villeneuve-Saint-Georges and finally to Abbeville (14 October) By the time the Advance BAPO reached Abbeville it had moved four times in 50 days and had journeyed over 460 miles using trains as well as horse and cart. Likewise between 1 and 4 September the BAPO moved from Le Havre to Nantes where it was re-opened. Once the military situation stabilised after the battle of Marne the BAPO was moved back to Havre and opened for work on 27 September. It remained in Le Havre for the rest of the war. Service improvements came with the BAPO's return to Le Havre as a dedicated daily packet ship was instituted between Southampton and the BAPO reducing the mail transit time from the UK to the soldier in the front line from ten days to four.

Throughout September and October the BEF received reinforcements from the United Kingdom and India. In anticipation of the arrival of Indian troops an APO was opened in Marseille, Southern France.

After the success of the Allies at the battles of Marne and Aisne which thwarted the Germans' intentions to capture Paris, the BEF was redeployed north to the Ypres area and in its wake followed the formations FPOs. The upheaval to the postal lines of communication caused by the retreat and re-deployment highlighted the inadequacies of dependency on the supply system for the movement of mail therefore in November the APS obtained lorries to transport mail between the railheads and set in motion what was to become a very efficient cross-post service.

King George V visited the BEF on 1 December 1914 and expressed satisfaction with the APS's performance.

Although there was a lack of experience on which to base a traffic forecast for Christmas 1914 the APS prudently temporarily increased the staff by 600 and obtained use of a further 50 lorries, as well as, getting agreement that all available trains could be used for despatches to the front. In the event Christmas passed without major incident with the APS delivering two million letters and half a million parcels.

On 28 December 1950, bags of mail were destroyed by fire when a returning supply train from II Corps was involved in a collision at Neilles Lès Bléquin, about 6 miles south of Saint-Omer, a considerable number of "Princess Mary's Gift Boxes" were destroyed in the incident.

==== 1915 ====
The APS continued to re-organise itself to meet the challenges of the changing tactical situation and an increase in troop levels on the Western Front. Packet boat connections were introduced between Folkestone and Boulogne where a BAPO was established in January, which improved the transit times for mails from 4 days to 2 days. In his dispatch of 5 April 1915 the CinC, Sir John French, put the high quality of the postal service on official record when he reported that:

The Army Postal Service has continued to work well and at the present time a letter posted in London is delivered at GHQ or at Headquarters of Army or Corps on the following evening and reaches an addressee in the trenches on the second day of posting. The delivery of parcels has also been accelerated and is carried out with regularity and dispatch.

In anticipation of the arrival of the Territorial Divisions in the spring of 1915, followed by Kitchener's new Army Divisions, experienced RE (PS) NCOs were drafted home to train the RE (PS) personnel attached to these new formations.

== Royal Engineers (Postal Section) – Second World War (1939–1945) ==
=== Home Forces Postal Organisation 1939–1945 ===
==== Home Postal Depot/Centre RE (1939–1945) ====
The centre of the worldwide Army Postal Services operation was the Home Postal Depot (HPD) RE, first established in London in the late summer of 1939, but was moved to GPO Reading shortly after the outbreak of war. It was then relocated to GPO premises in Bournemouth to be nearer to the Continent and therefore provide a more efficient service to the troops of the British Expeditionary Force (BEF) serving in France and Belgium.

Correspondence addressed to "APO England" and to Army and RAF units serving overseas tended at the GPO was circulated to the HPD RE. The Depot, whose primary responsibility was to collect, sort and despatch military mail to its final destination, also acted as a recruitment, training and reinforcement depot, as well as, a Records Office for the RE (PS) and a supply centre for Postal units worldwide.

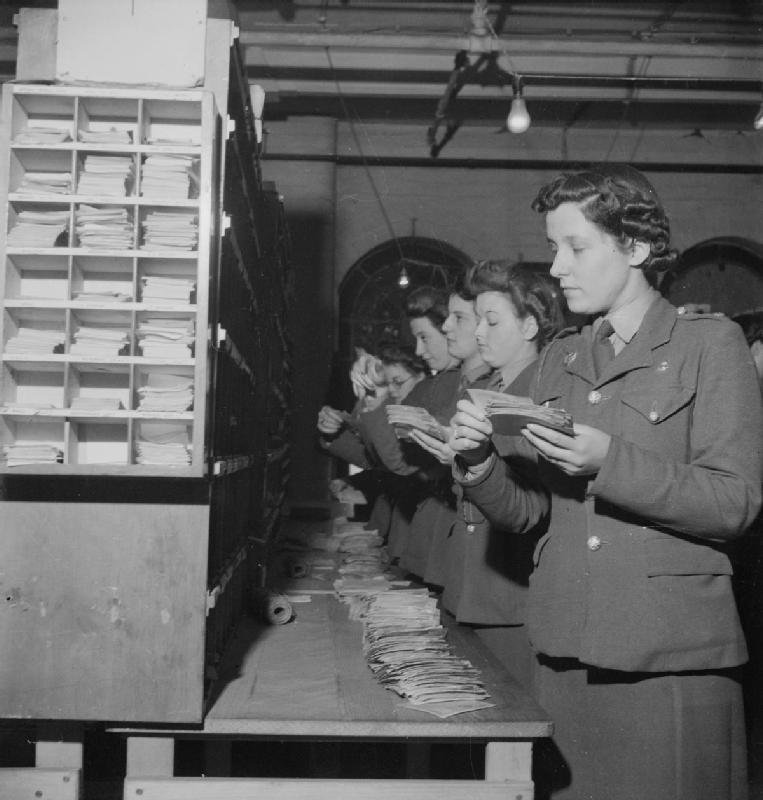
Postal trained ATS sorting letters at the Home Postal Centre RE, Nottingham (1944). The ATS made up 48% of the 3,000 workforce employed at the HPC RE.

In May 1941 the Depot was redesignated the Home Postal Centre RE (HPC RE) and relocated to Nottingham, where the organisation requisitioned, for operational and billeting purposes, a hundred and forty of the city's buildings, including; the Vyvella factory premises, the Hickings buildings, the GPO's Queen Street offices and Trent Bridge Cricket ground. It remained in Nottingham until 1947.

The HPC RE was organised into several departments and branches, each responsible for their own part of the postal operation. They included:

- Letter and Parcel Sorting Offices
- Inquiry Branch
- Returned Letter Branch
- Locations Branch
- POW Mail Section
- Telegram, Airgraph, Administration, messing and Motor Transport Departments

These branches, sections and departments were staffed by a mixture of RE (PS), ATS and civilian personnel.

Heavy manual tasks, such as carrying parcel bags, were often undertaken by conscientious objectors assigned to the HPC RE.

GPO trains and road service schedules, as well as, specially dedicated trains were used to convey mail between the HPC, the GPO, the Army Postal Distribution Centres (APDC), the overseas embarkation ports of Liverpool, Bristol and Glasgow, the airfields in the Midlands and the flying boat port of Poole.

===== Tracing undeliverable mail =====
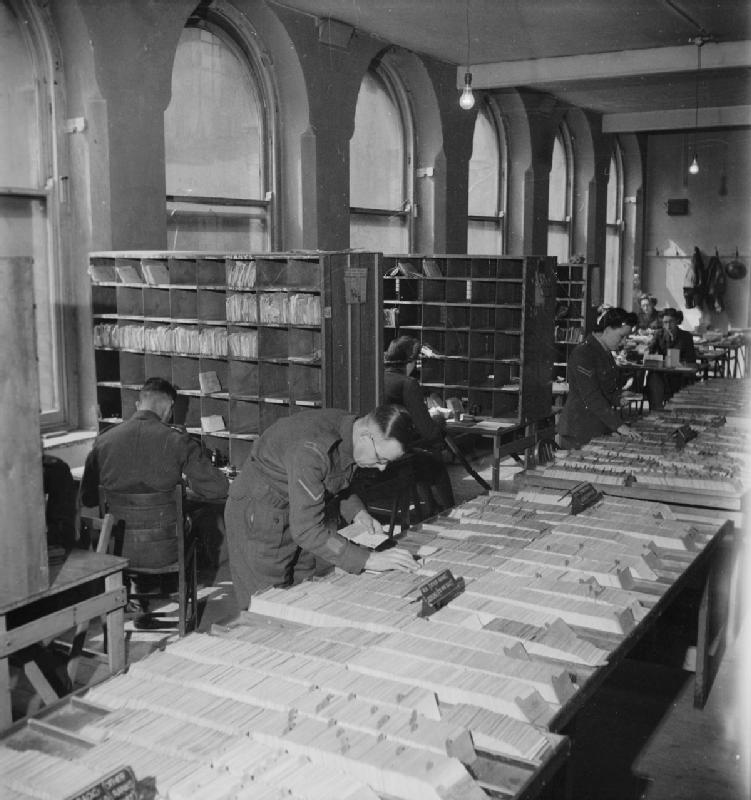
Tracing record office at the Home Postal Centre RE, Nottingham (1944)

It is a sad fact that during war battlefield casualties invariably produce large quantities of undeliverable mail. In the field, such mail that comes to hand in the units was checked against unit records and disposed of appropriately.

Unit mail which could not be delivered for whatever reason was returned to the Army Post Office (APO) or Field Post Office (FPO), and sent back to postal detachments located at the formation's 2nd Echelon. These detachments checked the mail against the Field Records. Mail that could not be dealt with was returned to the Return Letter Branch (RLB) at HPC RE for further searching and consultation with the Records Office of the appropriate arm. If that proved unsuccessful the letter was eventually returned to the sender.

In the cases where the addressee had been killed in action or was reported missing, extreme care was taken to ensure that returned mail did not arrive at the sender's address before the official notification had been issued.

==== Army Postal Distribution Centres (APDC) (1940–1945) ====
In the dark months that following the fall of France and the debacle in Norway, Britain, with its shattered armies freshly snatched from mainland Europe, started to build its defences in preparation for an invasion by Nazi Germany.

The defensive scheme required that the Army Postal Service (APS) form a nationwide postal distribution network for military units. The service was based upon the Home Postal Centre, Royal Engineers (HPC RE) and the establishment of six Army Postal Distribution Centres (APDC) located at:

- London – APDC 1
- Bristol – APDC 2
- Leeds – APDC 3
- Crewe – APDC 4
- Edinburgh – APDC 5
- Belfast – APDC 6

The APDCs received their mail direct from the GPO or the HPC RE. Units were responsible for collecting from, and delivering their mail to their allocated APDC, this system remained in place until the end of the war. (Their war diaries are held in the RE Library.)

As part of this system the concept of the "Closed" address (e.g. Number, Rank, Name, Unit, c/o APO England) was developed. It was an innovation that was to later assist in providing the necessary security to ensure the masking of troop movements during the build-up for D-Day and the subsequent success of Operation Overlord (D-Day landings). The closed address concept was the forerunner of today's BFPO address system.

=== British Expedition Force (BEF) 1939–1940 ===
Immediately on the outbreak of war members of the RE (PS) were mobilised and advance parties of the Postal units, under the command of Colonel W Roberts the Assistant Director Army Postal Services (ADAPS) BEF, were sent to France with their formations.

By mid September 1939 a Base Army Post Office (Base APO) was established at Cherbourg and a Regulating Section was set up at the BEF Assembly Area in Le Mans. Army Post Offices (APOs) were deployed along the lines of communications and FPOs with their respective formations.

The APS provided mail collection and distribution facilities, sold stamps, postal orders and postal stationery, as well as, providing a Telegram service. The transit time for mail between the UK and BEF was 3–4 days. During the 'Phoney War' period a 'cross post' operation was laid for intra-formation mail, the service also carried most of the Royal Signals Despatch Rider Letter Service (DRLS) material. The APS handled an average of 9,000 mailbags a day.

As part of the "Plan D" the Base APO was moved to Le Havre and a Regulating Post Office was established at Bolougne to receive mails from Folkestone. This improved the transit time to 2–3 days.

Postal personnel and their mails were evacuated from Dunkirk during 23 May – 6 June 1940. Sapper (later Lieutenant Colonel) John Turver described his first sight of the beaches and the process of evacuation:

What a sight met our eyes, as far as could be seen the sand was covered by a winding column of men who were patiently waiting their turn to go to the mole and on to the jetty. The system which was in operation was that groups of fifty men had to be formed under a chosen leader, and then only would they take their place in the waiting column. All this time we carried with us our cumbersome cash box which was our stock of several hundred pounds worth of stamps and Postal Orders ... Cheerfully we attached ourselves to a crowd of RE's who were forming their own company into several parties of fifty.

Sapper Turver was successfully evacuated, as was Colonel Roberts and his Postal Directorate, but on his arrival in Dover Roberts was immediately ordered back to Cherbourg to organise the evacuation of the rear area Postal units and any outstanding mails.

Meanwhile, British troops left on French soil west of the river Seine had their own problems, Captain (later Lieutenant Colonel) E. G. Hucker RE, OC 2nd Line of Communications (L of C) Postal Unit RE, was among them and kept a private diary (held in the RE Library). His entries for 9–10 June 1940 give some insight into the confusion that reigned immediately after the fall of Dunkirk, he recorded:

Sunday 9 June 1940:

... Trucks of inward (UK) mails (285 bags) received at station [Lisieux] and dealt with. HQ Rouen Sub area, Signals and other small units obtained mail but in general unit mail remained on hand as unit locations were not available. Moreover "G" staff (Capt Harper) informed me that the Postal Unit must be kept mobile ready to make another move at short notice. ADST seen and a lorry requisitioned for transport of mail. "G" staff and "Q" staff (Major Jackson Darling) instructed me to hold all mail for 51 Div as it was impossible to reach them across [the] Seine ...

Beauman Div called and collected mail, A Div did not call. Mails for 51 Div returned to Mézidon by road for re-consigning to Base. Party left at Mezidon on Colonel Robert's instructions for requisition trucks. Mails from [APO] S6 returned there except those for 51 Div.

Monday 10 June 1940:

Col Roberts left for Mézidon and Le Mans – taking two bags of unsorted English mail for Base APO 1 [Cherbourg]. Acting on instructions party left for Pont L'Evêque in an effort to locate [APO] S9 staff. I saw Col [John] Evans [DADAPS BEF] there who stated he had no knowledge of [APO] S9 staff and that if they had not already been evacuated to a place south of the river [Seine] they would go to England directly from Le Havre. Telephonic communication with Le Havre not possible after 12 noon.

Railway communication between Lisieux & Base APO [Cherbourg] interrupted by the enemy's successful bombing of the line at Serquigny. Mails for 1 AD collected by Lieutenant Cashin on way to Le Mans.

Information received that Beauman Div already moved to Le Mans area at about 9.0pm 9/6/40. 2 L of C Postal Unit now in forward positions ...

The entries after this date become sparser and terser as the situation became more desperate, however, the unit was eventually evacuated intact from St Malo.

=== Middle East Force (MEF) 1940–1945 ===
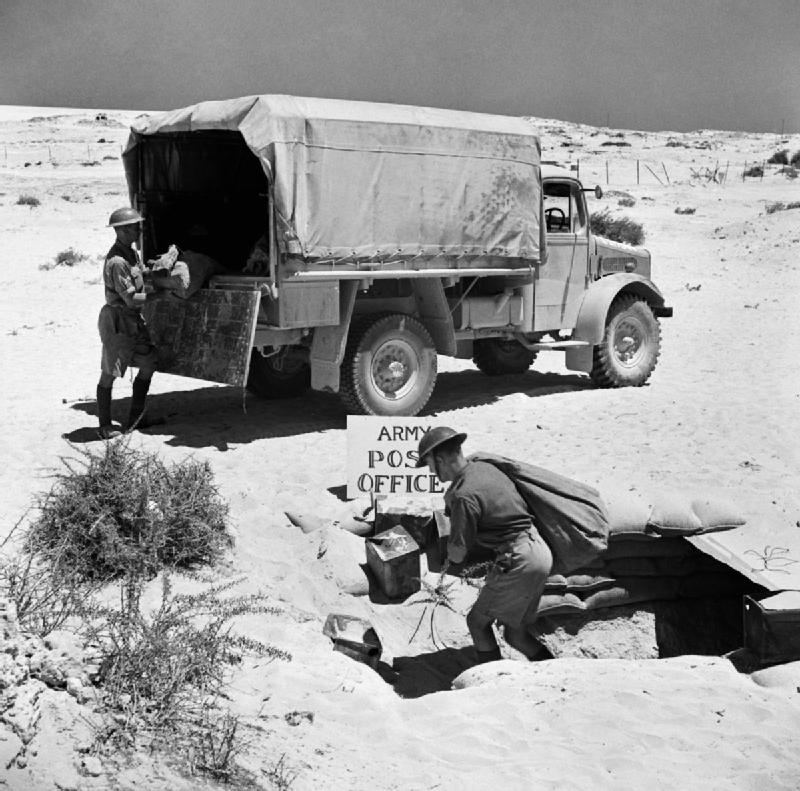
The mail being unloaded from an Army Post Office lorry at one of the many post offices in the Western Desert, 16 July 1941

At the time that war was declared peacetime garrison troops stationed in North Africa and the Middle East were using the civilian postal services, as they had done since 1882, but by July 1940, under a special arrangement with the Egyptian government, a Base APO was established in Cairo and the Royal Engineers (Postal Section) were allowed to run their own post offices and collect the resulting revenue.

Postal units were deployed with their formations throughout North Africa and the Middle East. Some of the RE (PS) personnel, along with their formations, were captured at Crete and Tobruk and spent the rest of the war as prisoners of war (POWs).

Surface mail routes through the Mediterranean became extremely vulnerable once Italy entered the war in June 1940 and by mid-1941, after Germany had conquered the Balkan regions, the direct air service to Cairo was cut. This meant that new routes for mail had to be found.

Surface mail was sent via the Cape of Good Hope and an air route was forged across the southern edge of the Sahara desert from Takoradi, West Africa to Khartoum, Sudan. From there it was carried north by rail.

These new routes were slower than the old routes and in a very short time they began to have an adverse effect on the morale of both the troops and their families. The situation was aggravated by the uncertainty and casualties caused by the German bombing of the major cities of Britain and the enemy U-boat action against the convoy ships carrying mails and supplies.

The mail, if it got through at all, could take 4–8 weeks to do so. To improve the service it was necessary to find a way to lighten the mail so that more of it could be carried by air. The solution, initiated by the APS and the GPO, was the introduction of the "airgraph" and the "air letter form".

==== Airgraph ====
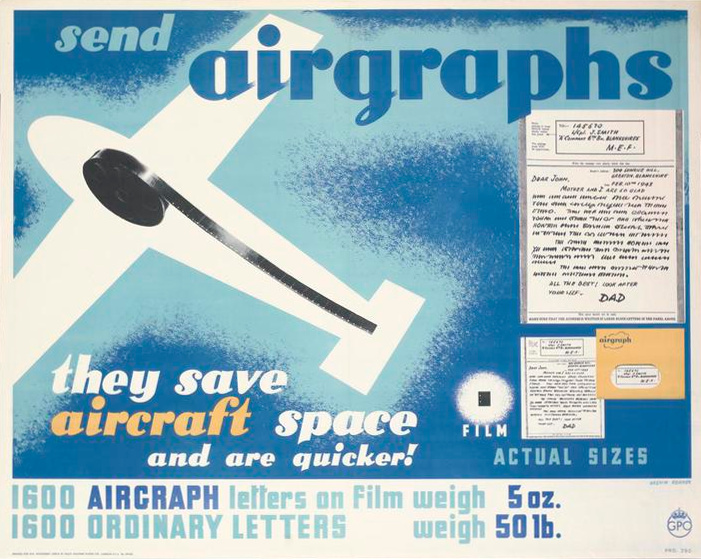
GPO Airgraph poster – showing an example of an 'airgraph'

The airgraph was invented in the 1930s by the Eastman Kodak Company inconjuction with Imperial Airways (now British Airways) and Pan-American Airways as a means of reducing the weight and bulk of mail carried by air. The airgraph forms, upon which the letter was written, were photographed and then sent as negatives on rolls of microfilm. A GPO poster of the time claimed that 1,600 letters on film weighed just 5 oz, while 1,600 ordinary letters weighed 50 lbs. At their destination the negatives were printed on photographic paper and delivered as airgraph letters through the normal APS or GPO systems.

In 1940 the Minister of Transport, Lieutenant Colonel Moore-Brabazon MC RFC, put forward the idea that airgraphs be used to reduce both the bulk and weight of mail travelling between the MEF and the UK. The matter was referred to the APS and the GPO, who jointly investigated the possibility of using airgraphs. This eventually lead to a service being instituted between England and Egypt in 1941 when 70,000 airgraphs were sent in the first batch and took three weeks to reach their destination.

Kodak had offices in Cairo that were capable of processing airgraph negatives, but it was not until the appropriate equipment arrived from America that their Cairo office That the APS was able to provide a return service to the UK.

In the theatres of war the whole airgraph operation was coordinated by the APS. Completed airgraph forms were collected by the A/FPOs and forwarded to the Kodak processing plants, which were co-located with the Base APOs.

The use of the airgraph was not rationed and its postage was also set at three pence (3d). Although the airgraph proved to be immediately popular, its use was limited because of its size (approx; 2 in × 3 in) and lack of privacy, so when sufficient aircraft capacity became available its use declined in favour of the air letter.

The airgraph service was later extended to: Canada (1941), East Africa (1941), Burma (1942), India (1942), South Africa (1942), Australia (1943), New Zealand (1943), Ceylon (1944), and Italy (1944).

==== Air Letter ====
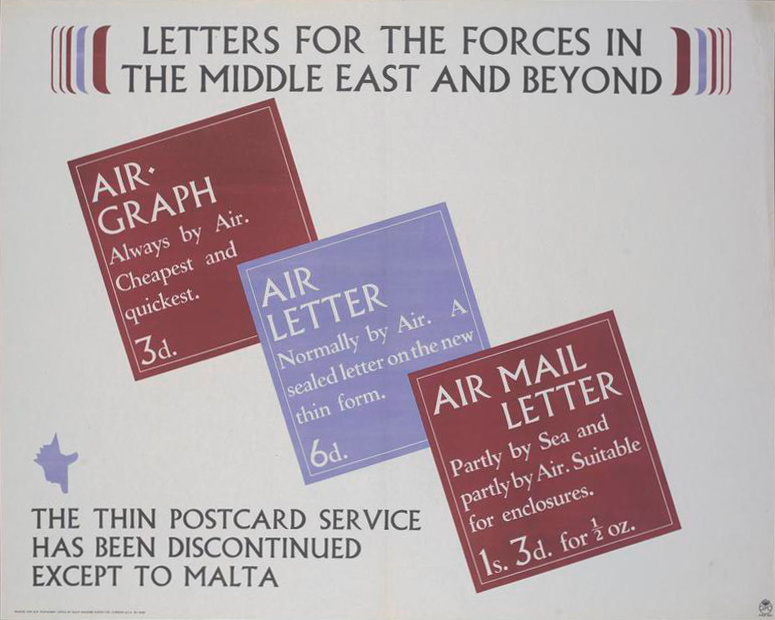
GPO poster

Lieutenant Colonel R. E. Evans RE, ADAPS MEF, proposed that a lightweight self-sealing letter card that weighed only 1/10 oz be adopted by the British Army for air mail purposes. He recommended its use to Sir Anthony Eden, the Secretary of State for War during his visit to the Middle East in late 1940. By January the following year, General Wavell, the Commander-in-Chief, MEF was told by Eden that "Your Assistant Director Army Postal Services may forthwith introduce an Air Mail Letter Card Service for the Middle East. Use British stamps from all countries, including Egypt."

On 1 March 1941, the service between the Middle East and the UK was started, using a combination of Imperial Airways flying boats and military transport.

The postage on each air letter was three pence (3d) and, due to limited air capacity, they were initially rationed at one per man per month but towards the end of the war, as more capacity became available, the ration was lifted.

The private nature of the air letter ensured its popularity among its users and that popularity, with its lightness, brought about its continued use as today's civilian air letter (aerogrammes) and the military "bluey".

=== British North Africa Force (BNAF) 1942–43 ===
The APS was not involved in the initial planning stages of Operation Torch, the 1942 Anglo-American invasion of North Africa. Consequently, a Base APO was not established in Algiers until a month after the invasion and through no fault of the APS the mail services to the BNAF were very poor in the initial stages. This was worsened by the fact that a convoy carrying the Christmas mails was sunk.

After consultation between the military authorities and the APS air links with the UK were established and both air letter and airgraph services were made available. Kodak established an airgraph processing station in Algiers, which was later to process the airgraphs sent by troops engaged in the Italian Campaign.

In theatre the mails were carried along the North African coast to the front lines by sea, rail and vehicles. The road service that operated over 500 miles from Algiers to the front was described as having "the regularity of a town collection in peacetime Britain".

A staff officer with the 6th Armoured Division commented that "As soon as the tanks pulled out of battle, there was the mail wanting for them – incredible."

=== Central Mediterranean Force (CMF) – Italy 1943–1945 ===
The Postal units of the MEF and BNAF, which made up the CMF, accompanied their respective formations on the invasion of Sicily and subsequent landings on mainland Italy. These invasions were the first major amphibious operations of the war. (A datestamp taken by a Postal unit from the Syracuse Post Office dated 10 July 1943, the day of the invasion is an exhibit in the RE Museum.)

FPOs were established on the beachheads during the landings at Salerno and Anzio. On two occasions mails leaving the Anizo beaches onboard LST were lost to enemy action.

Once the VIII Army was secured on mainland Italy Base APOs were established, to handle their mails, at Bari on the heel of Italy then at Naples, which became the main Base APO.

Mails were distributed within the VIII Army operational areas by truck that were augmented by rail and air, which were developed to provide an internal mail service to troops as they moved north. Surface mails entered and exited via Naples, Bari, and Taranto. Until the liberation of Paris on 25 August 1944 airmail was staged through Gibraltar on its way between the UK and Naples, but after that date a more direct air route over France was established, which reduced the transit time for airmails to the Italian and Far East theatres.

The only outlet for telegrams accepted at A/FPOs in Sicily was by air from Catania via Castel Benito to Cairo where they were passed to Marconi for electronic transmission to their destination. Once the Base APO was established in Naples the telegrams were flown direct to Cairo.

=== India and Far East 1942–1945 ===
The mail services for troops serving in the Far East was administered and provided by three agencies: the RE (PS), the Welfare Department of the Adjutant-General's Branch of the Indian Army (GHQ, India) and the Indian Army Postal Service (IAPS), an arrangement that was fraught with political tensions and proved to be an uneasy working relationship.

The outbound surface mail travelled by sea from Liverpool to Durban, South Africa, at which point an APS Postal Regulating Office was established, the mail then crossed the Indian Ocean to the IAPS Postal Clearing Section at Bombay (now Mumbai) and from there it was forwarded to the battle fronts in the Far East.

There was a limited airmail service in operation between India and Britain that followed the Empire air post service routes across the Middle East.

After the fall of Singapore and the retreat from Burma in 1942 the military postal services in India came to a virtual standstill because a serious backlog of undeliverable mail had built up at the IAPS Postal Clearing Section, Bombay (now Mumbai). A situation that prompted complaints to be heard in the Houses of Parliament. The Director Army Postal Services (DAPS), Brig F Lane, who worked from the GPO HQ, London was instructed to resolve the problem. He sent a member of his staff, Lieutenant Colonel E. G. Hucker RE to India to investigate the apparent shortcomings of the service.

Hucker concluded that the IAPS should be reorganised along British lines and the adoption of this recommendation coincided with the establishment of the HQ Allied Land Forces, South East Asia (HQ ALFSEA) in 1943, (fragments of his report are held in the Museum).

A Base APO was established at Calcutta (now Kolkata) by the RE (PS) and mail for the British and African troops engaged in the recapture of Burma was forward from there to postal units at the forward supply depots and hence to the front line FPOs.

=== Reconquest of Burma – mail airdrops ===
Postal units, officered by RE (PS), were formed for the 81 (West African) and 11 (East African) Divisions and accompanied their respective formations to the Far East.

The 81 (WA) Division Postal Unit RE under the command of Lieutenant AE Tee RE become the pioneers of air dropping mails to forward FPOs and troops. Special air despatch postal units were located at the main airfields and were responsible for packing and loading mails onto the correct aircraft. Dedicated mail sorties were flown in Dakotas from the main supply depots at Imphal and later Chittagong. Lieutenant Tee was subsequently promoted and posted to the Chindits to oversee their mail services. L.5 casualty evacuation aircraft were also used to carry mail between the front line FPOs and the APOs at the rear area airfields.

On the ground close co-operation existed between the British and Indian APSs and the two services lines of communication were dovetailed to make efficient use of the resources.

=== Singapore and Postal POWs ===
On the fall of Singapore, to the Japanese, on 15 February 1942 the entire staff of the 18 Division Postal Unit RE were interned.

During their internment they took responsibility, as far as their captors allowed, for the organisation of the mail service within the Changi gaol and on the 'death' railway work camps in Thailand, for which the OC of the unit, Captain W. A. Border RE was later awarded a Member of the Order of the British Empire (MBE). In 1946 he wrote of this episode:

After over twelve months the first mail arrived from home, these letters were quite twelve months old, and contrary to the usual Japanese practice the men of the Postal Unit got the work of distribution.

On 18 June 1942 twelve members of the unit left Changi POW Camp for Thailand. In July 1942 Captain Border RE was appointed Assistant Camp Commandant 18 Div, but by November he was ordered, with Spr Joslin, to Bampong Thailand where the POWs were engaged in the construction of the Bangkok–Moulmein railway.

From July 1943 onwards Postal Unit personnel in Thailand gradually split, men being included in various parties sent to jungle camps and employed on the building of the Bangkok–Moulmein railway or transferred to camps in Saigon (now Ho Chi Minh City, Vietnam) and Tokyo, Japan.

Of the 27 members of the unit, 17 (63%) of them survived to be repatriated back to the UK at the end of the war.

=== Operation Overlord and the British Liberation Army (BLA), 1944–1945 ===
The APS played a significant part in Operation Overlord not only as a morale boaster, for General Montgomery and his staff considered that a regular mail service was "the greatest morale factor in an army", but probably more importantly, as one of the means of maintaining the elaborate deception plan that was essential to retain the element of surprise required to ensure the success of the operation.

==== APO England and its contribution to the deception plan ====
After the ADPCs had been established in late 1940 UK stationed units were served by them using a "closed address" (i.e. Number, Rank, Name, Unit, c/o APO England), the style of which was already in use for overseas theatres (e.g. c/o BEF, MEF, SEAC, BLA etc.). This was a radical departure from the past for until then UK based units used their normal civilian GPO address and service.

The importance of this address style was that it meant letters so addressed were circulated under APS control thus providing a simple but effective weapon in the Staff's deception arsenal. The GPO circulated "APO England" mail to the HPC RE, where it was sorted and forwarded under military control to the correct destination thereby providing the necessary security to mask troop movements and locations. During the buildup to the invasion planners ordered that UK units adopt this address style. Such an instruction had obvious implications on the staffing of the HPC, which was reluctantly allowed to increase its establishment to accommodate the extra work. The 'closed address' concept remains a part of today's BFPO address system.

==== Marshalling areas ====
In the prelude to the invasion, troops were sealed in their marshalling areas and their only official contact with the outside world was through the camp's FPO set up by the APS. To maintain secrecy all private mail posted at these FPOs was impounded and stored at the APDCs until the news of the landings had been made public knowledge by the news agencies.

During this time special trains running out of Nottingham were set up to carry mails to the marshalling areas and embarkation ports. Mail was delivered to the assault troops up until D−1 (5 June 1944).

==== Pre-location scheme ====
The APS planners were among the very few staffs that were entrusted with knowledge of the full battle plan, with such information, the ADAPS Second Army, Lieutenant Colonel C. R. Smith RE conceived a pre-location scheme that enabled mail to be delivered to the various 'serials' of each unit as they landed in Normandy. The scheme worked on a system of 'phantom FPOs' whereby units were allocated FPOs from which they collect their mails. In reality they were served by the FPO closest to them, which may not have been their allocated FPO, but was regarded by the APS for location purposes as their phantom FPO.

==== Normandy Beaches ====
FPOs attached to the breach parties and special forces were established on the beaches on D-Day. Although it was planned that mail be delivered to units on D+1 (7 June 1944), mail was delivered the following day (D+2) because of confusion caused by the day's delay of the invasion.

To ensure the safe recovery of mail from ships arriving from Southampton, a Postal officer was given the task of patrolling the choppy anchorages in an amphibious Jeep bawling through a megaphone at each ship "Are you carrying mail?" This system remained in place until the Mulberry Harbours at Arromanches were established to allow mails to be docked more formally.

The 6 Airborne Division Postal Unit RE (commanded by Captain JCG Hine RE and as a unit accompanied the Division on its airborne drops during the night of 5/6 June 1944), and the Beach Group APO S698 made the first despatch from Normandy on D+2 (8 June 1944).

==== Base Army Post Office 8 ====
The main Base Army Post Office (No 8) arrived in theatre on D+10 (16 June 1944) and established itself in a barn at Crepon. The barn had to be cleared of 20 ft deep accumulation of manure and straw by bulldozers of a RE Road Construction Company before the Base Army Post Office could become operational.

The Base Army Post Office was later moved forward to Brussels, where it remained until the end of the war.

The advancing British and Canadian forces took Antwerp, Belgium on 4 September 1944. Later in the month on 26 September the Base Army Post Office closed at Crepon and at the same time opened in a large warehouse belonging to the Societe de Congo, in Antwerp.

On 8 March 1945 the Base Army Post Office in Antwerp received a hit from a VI pilotless aircraft, which destroyed much of the building, but miraculously only one serious injury was sustained. As the building was so seriously damaged it was decided to move the Base Army Post Office to Brussels where it remained until the end of war. After the Base Army Post Office moved to Brussels members of the postal trained ATS from HPC RE, Nottingham were sent out to augment its staff.

==== Airlifts and road service schedules ====
On 6 July 1944 (D+30) a two-way airlift system was established between the UK and airstrips in Normandy for the exclusive transportation of letters and newspapers.

As the British Army advanced along the north coast of France into Belgium and finally into Germany, these airlifts continued and were augmented by an elaborate system of road service schedules that linked the airstrips with the Base APO and A/FPOs. Towards the end of 1944 the schedules were settled and it was said that ones' watch could be set by the arrival of these vehicles, such was their punctuality. The principle routes were:

- Down Special – Brussels Airfield, Amiens, Rouen
- Up Special – Rouen, Amiens, Arras, Antwerp
- Arras Limited Up – Arras, Lille, Antwerp
- Arras Limited Down – Brussels Airfield, Lille, Arras

The service provided a transit time of 2–3 days from the UK.

In September 1944 an Advance Base Army Post Office (No 18) was opened in Dieppe, it was transferred to Ostend and on 25 October 1944 was redesignated 18 Postal Port Regulating Section.

Once troops crossed the Rhine a Postal Despatch Rider Service was operated daily on a schedule between the Army Depot, the Location Centre and the Base Army Post Office. This enabled the APS to keep up to date with the rapidly changing locations of advancing units.

==== End of hostilities in Europe ====
After the German surrender FPOs were established in all the main towns of the British zone of Germany. Airmail was flown to various forward airfields, but Bückeburg, Lower Saxony, Germany eventually became the main terminal. Surface mail entered Europe at Calais and forwarded to the Rhine by train, from there it was transferred to vehicles and transported by road.

A base post office was established in Herford, which in 1946 became the Zone Postal Depot.

== Royal Engineers (Postal Section/Postal & Courier Communications/Postal & Courier Services) – post-war period (1945–1993) ==
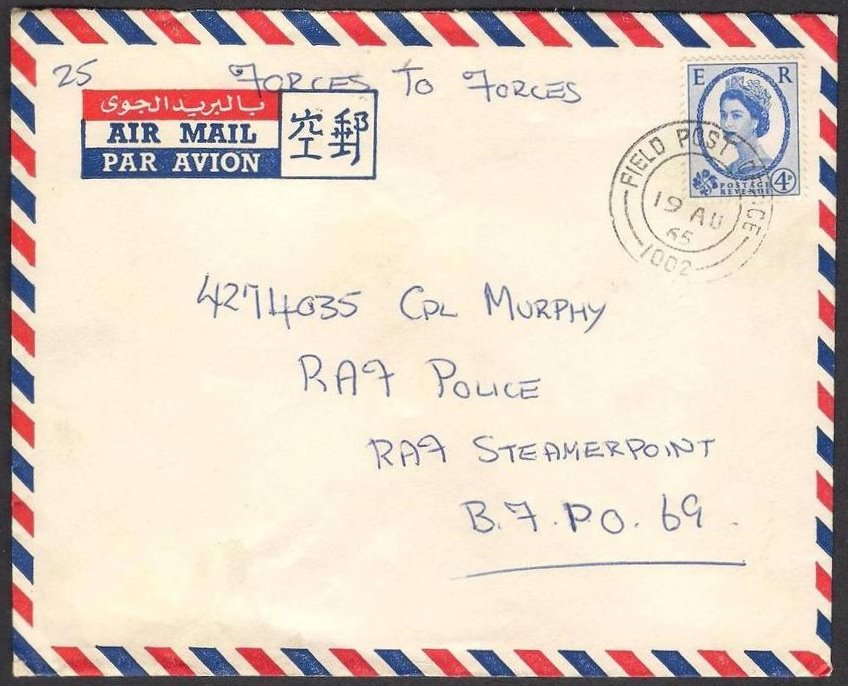
A 1965 BFPO to BFPO letter.

The responsibility for military mail remained with the Royal Engineers until it was transferred to the Royal Logistic Corps on its formation in April 1993. In July of that year the Defence Postal & Courier Services Agency was established. It was the first Defence Agency to be formed within the Quartermaster General's (QMG's) Department and was owned by the Director General Logistic Support (Army) (DG Log SP (A)).

=== Home Postal Depot, Royal Engineers (1945–1993) ===
The Home Postal Depot continue to operate under the management of the British Army after the end of the Second World War.

In 1947 the Home Postal Centre RE was redesigned the Home Postal Depot and moved from Nottingham to Sutton Coldfield, where it took residence in the buildings that had been occupied by the American UK Postal Depot.
