= Zumbox =

Proposed hybrid U.S. mail service for receiving postal mail via the web

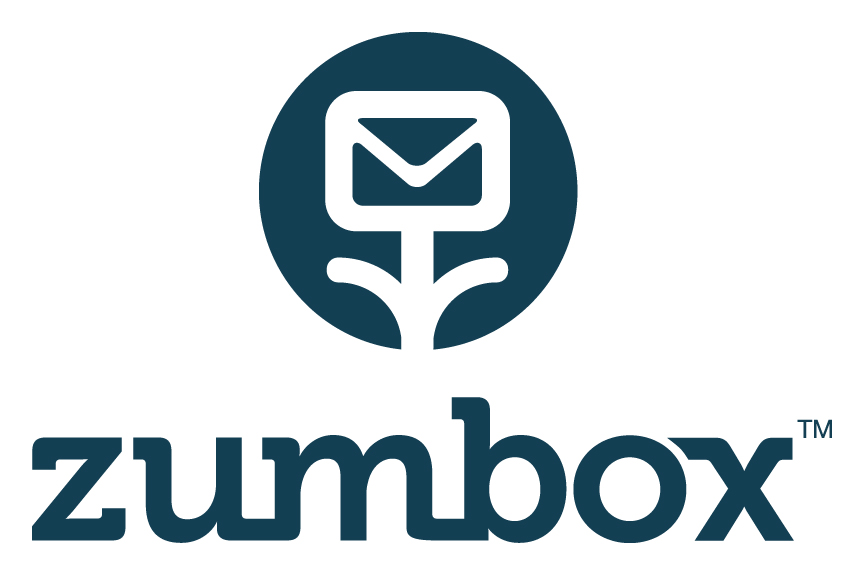
- Type: Private
- Founded: 2007
- Defunct: 2014
- Headquarters: Los Angeles, California, U.S.
- Number of employees: 25-50
- Website: https://web.archive.org/web/20090418182000/

Zumbox is a proposed hybrid mail service for receiving postal mail via the web. The service was intended to work in parallel to traditional postal services, whereby a digital mailbox—a Zumbox— would be created for every street address in the U.S.

People were able to claim their Zumbox via a paper mail confirmation code.

Zumbox provided security in compliance with PCI DSS, BITS and HIPAA security rules and regulations.

Zumbox was founded in 2007 in Los Angeles, and obtained more than $30 million in venture capital. After seven years of development, Zumbox announced in 2014 that it lacked sufficient investor interest to launch as a national brand.
