= First Issues Collectors Club =

First Issues Collectors Club, or FICC, is an international society for collectors of the first postage stamps issued by any legitimate postal administration.

FICC is American Philatelic Society affiliate #232 and is a non-profit educational organization.

FICC was founded in 1990 by a small group of collectors, who elected David Olson of New Hampshire its first president. FICC currently serves about 100 members on five continents.

While most stamp collectors can not afford such first issues as those of Mauritius (see the Mauritius "Post Office" stamps) or Hawaii (see Hawaiian Missionaries), FICC is devoted to the study of all the more than 700 stamps initially issued by legitimate postal authorities. The determination of the accurate first day of issue is of particular interest, since this may affect the listing by catalogs, such as the Scott catalog and Michel catalog, for example.

The Penny Black, the world's first postage stamp, is special, but any stamp issuing entity has its own first issue. FICC promotes the study, collection and enjoyment of all of them.

== Society services ==
FICC offers the following services to its members:

- First Issues, a quarterly journal.
- A web based forum for discussions of all things related to collecting first issues.
- Member to member opinions on the genuineness of stamps and related material.
- Stamp auctions

== See also ==
- American Philatelic Society
- Royal Philatelic Society London
- List of notable postage stamps
- Timeline of postal history
