= Online post office =

Type of commercial mail receiving agency

An online post office is a commercial mail receiving agency that implements the concept of hybrid mail, enabling conventional mail to become electronic, or electronic correspondence to be printed and mailed at a remote location. As paper correspondence becomes inconvenient for businesses that are evolving to maintain a paperless office, services have emerged to outsource the task of scanning snail mail as it arrives. Some online post offices will scan envelopes for subscribing customers, and offer handling options (E.g. whether to scan the contents, store, or shred them). Some providers will systematically scan and make the contents immediately available.

In contrast, L-Mail is designed for senders, enabling mail to go from an electronic form to conventional mail. Some online post offices will offer a send feature as a companion service. Sending mail electronically and having it printed close to the delivery point shortens the time it takes the correspondence to reach the recipient.

== See also ==
- Hybrid mail
- Email
