= Hybrid mail =

Hybrid mail is mail that is delivered using a combination of electronic and physical delivery. Usually, it involves digital data being transformed into physical letter items at distributed print centres located as close as possible to the final delivery addresses. An e-mail letter (also L-mail and letter mail) is a letter which is sent as an email using a computer, then printed out and delivered as a traditional (physical) letter.

It is a communication means between the cyber and the material world. A commercial implementation was created by MCI Mail which used a bespoke internal e-mail system to provide e-mail services (including internet e-mail) and e-mail to hardcopy, with first availability in 1989. The system was re-invented by UK company CFH Docmail, who launched their Hybrid Mail solution Docmail in 2008. The printer or mail transfer agent prints the electronic mail on paper, the mail transport agent packs it into an envelope and the mail delivery agent or postman delivers it to the receiver's mailbox. Generally there is a fee for this service; however very small amounts and single email letters may be free of charge depending on the service provider and generally fees are much lower than cost incurred in sending the mail directly or by using a franking machine. Research shows that in the UK, for a simple enclosed letter, posted 2nd class, the saving could be as much as much as 40% per letter.

There are also reverse systems, where handwritten letters can be delivered as email. This mail scanning service, sometimes called letter email, is increasingly popular with businesses and individuals who wish to access their mail from another country.

== See also ==
- .post – Internet top-level domain for the postal union
- E-COM – Hybrid mail system
- Email forwarding – Mechanism by which a mail server sends the emails of one of its users to another address
- Fax – Method of transmitting images, often of documents
- Mail forwarding – Postal service for change of address, etc.
- Online post office – Type of commercial mail receiving agency
- Personal letter – Written message from one to another
- Postal history – Study of postal systems
- Print-to-mail – Contracting internal tasks to an external organization
- V-mail – Hybrid mail process of the US in WWII
- Webmail – Email service that can be accessed using a web browser
- Zumbox – Proposed hybrid U.S. mail service for receiving postal mail via the web
