= Alphonse Pyramus de Candolle =

Swiss botanist (1806–1893)

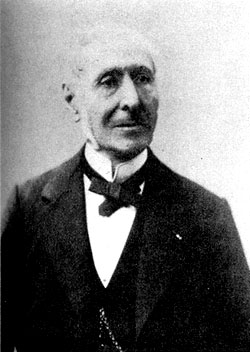
- Alphonse Pyramus de Candolle
- Born: 27 October 1806; Paris, France
- Died: 4 April 1893 (aged 86); Geneva, Switzerland
- Other name: Alphonse Pyrame de Candolle
- Awards: Linnean Medal (1889)
- Scientific career
- Fields: botany
- Workplaces: University of Geneva
- Author abbrev. (botany): A.DC.

Signature
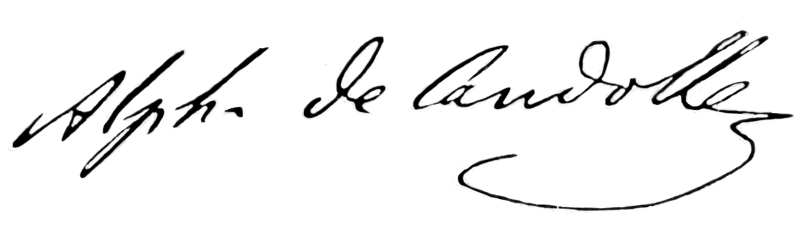

Alphonse Louis Pierre Pyramus (or Pyrame) de Candolle (27 October 1806 – 4 April 1893) was a French-Swiss botanist, the son of the Swiss botanist Augustin Pyramus de Candolle.

== Biography ==
De Candolle, son of Augustin Pyramus de Candolle, first devoted himself to the study of law, but gradually drifted to botany and finally succeeded to his father's chair at the University of Geneva. He published a number of botanical works, including continuations of the Prodromus in collaboration with his son, Casimir de Candolle. Among his other contributions is the formulation, based on his father's work for the Prodromus, of the first Laws of Botanical Nomenclature, which was adopted by the International Botanical Congress in 1867, and was the prototype of the current ICN.

He was elected a foreign member of the Royal Swedish Academy of Sciences in 1859 and was awarded the Linnean Medal of the Linnean Society of London in 1889. He was elected a foreign member of the Royal Netherlands Academy of Arts and Sciences in 1878. He is also known for a study of the religious affiliations of foreign members of the French and British Academies of Science during the Scientific Revolution that demonstrated that in both academies Protestants were more heavily represented than Catholics by comparison with catchment populations. This observation continues to be used (for example in David Landes' 1999 Wealth and Poverty of Nations, cf. revised paperback edition, 177) as a demonstration that Protestants were more inclined to be scientifically active during the Scientific Revolution than Roman Catholics.

In 1855 de Candolle published Géographie botanique raisonnée. This was a ground-breaking book that for the first time brought together the large mass of data being collected by the expeditions of the time. The natural sciences had become highly specialized, yet this book synthesized them to explain living organisms within their environment, and why plants were distributed the way they were, all upon a geologic scale. This book had a significant impact upon Harvard botanist Asa Gray.

Alphonse de Candolle also had the unexpected distinction of triggering the adoption of pre-paid postage in the Canton and City of Geneva, by a long address which he gave to the governing council in 1843. This led to them issuing Switzerland's second postage stamp, the famous Double Geneva later in that year. (Also see Postage stamps and postal history of Switzerland).

== Works ==
- de Candolle, Alphonse (1855). Géographie botanique raisonnée. Paris: V. Masson. OCLC 2156582.
- de Candolle, Alphonse (1885) [1882]. Origin of Cultivated Plants. New York: Appleton. (First edition in French)
- Candolle, Alphonse de; Candolle, Casimir de (1878–1896). Monographiæ phanerogamarum Prodromi nunc continuatio, nunc revisio. 9 vols (in Latin). Paris: vol.1–8, G. Masson; vol.9, Masson & Cie.
- Candolle, Alphonse de – Lois de la nomenclature botanique adoptées par le Congrès international de botanique tenu à Paris en août 1867... Genève et Bale: H. Georg; Paris: J.-B. Baillière et fils, 1867. 64 p.
- Candolle, Alphonse de (Membre Corr. de l'Acad. Sciences, Paris; Foreign Member, Royal Soc, etc.) – Histoire des Sciences et des Savants depuis deux Siècles. Geneva, 1873.
- Candolle, Alphonse de. (1882). Darwin considéré au point de vue des causes de son succès et de l'importance de ses travaux. Genève: H. Georg.

== Bibliography ==
- Fancher, R E (October 1983). "Alphonse de Candolle, Francis Galton, and the early history of the nature-nurture controversy". Journal of the History of the Behavioral Sciences. 19 (4): 341–52. doi:10.1002/1520-6696(198310)19:4<341::aid-jhbs2300190403>3.0.co;2-7. PMID 11608560.
- de Morsier, G. (1972). "[Unpublished correspondence between Alphonse de Candolle (1806–1893) and Francis Galton (1822-1911)]". Gesnerus. 29 (3): 129–60. PMID 4570878.
- Works available at Botanicus
