= E-COM =

Hybrid mail system

E-COM, short for Electronic Computer Originated Mail, was a hybrid mail process used from 1982 to 1985 by the U.S. Postal Service (USPS) to print electronically originated mail, and deliver it in envelopes to customers within two days of transmission.

== Description ==
The E-COM service allowed customers to transmit messages of up to two pages from their own computers, via telecommunication lines, to one or more of 25 serving post offices (SPOs) located in the following cities: Atlanta, Boston, Charlotte, Chicago, Cincinnati, Dallas, Denver, Detroit, Kansas City, Los Angeles, Milwaukee, Minneapolis, Nashville, New Orleans, New York, Orlando, Philadelphia, Phoenix, Pittsburgh, Richmond, St. Louis, San Antonio, San Francisco, Seattle, and Washington, D.C. After an electronic message was received by an SPO, it was processed and sorted by ZIP Code, then printed on letter-size bond paper, folded and sealed, in an envelope printed with a blue E-COM logo. In order to be eligible for the service, customers were required to send a minimum of 200 messages per transmission.

== History ==
USPS began looking into electronic mail in 1977. E-COM was originally proposed on September 8, 1978, and service was expected to begin by December of that year. The proposal was caught up in a two-year regulatory dispute, and a modified version of the E-COM service as recommended by the Postal Rate Commission was approved on August 15, 1980, by the Postal Service Board of Governors.

E-COM services began on January 4, 1982, and the original rates were 26 cents for the first page plus 2 cents for the second page for each transmission. In addition, there was an annual fee of $50 for the service. During its inaugural year of service, 3.2 million E-COM messages were sent, and more than 600 customers submitted applications for the service. Federal law prohibits the USPS from subsidizing a mail class by overcharging the users of other mail classes; however, E-COM was heavily subsidized from its introduction. During its first year of operation, the USPS lost $5.25 per letter. The House Government Operations Committee indicated that "The Postal Service deliberately manipulates the release of information about E-COM in order to make E-COM appear to be more successful than it really is."

On June 18-21, 1982, the Joint Subcommittee on Economic Goals and Intergovernmental policy, held a hearing on the future of mail delivery in the United States, and whether the U.S. Postal Service should be prevented from competing with the numerous commercial electronic mail providers, then in operation.

Subsequent to this, there were difficulties in securing approval for a competitive and profitable rate for the service, and beginning in June 1984 the Postal Service started trying to sell the E-COM service to a private firm. Having not received offers that were financially attractive enough to be accepted, Postmaster General Paul Carlin notified the board of governors at the June 3, 1985, meeting that the postal service would request through the Postal Rate Commission the authority to close down the operation as soon as possible. The E-COM service was officially discontinued on September 2, 1985.

Another service, INTELPOST, the Postal Service's international electronic mail venture beginning in 1980 which provided a high-speed facsimile copy service between continents and was also shut down in the mid 1980s.

== Legacy ==
The abbreviation E-COM resulted in Electronics journal publishing a headline in June 1979 reading “Postal Service pushes ahead with E-mail”. This is the first known usage of the term E-mail.

== See also ==
- History of email
- Hybrid mail
- Print-to-mail
