= V-mail =

Hybrid mail process of the US in WWII

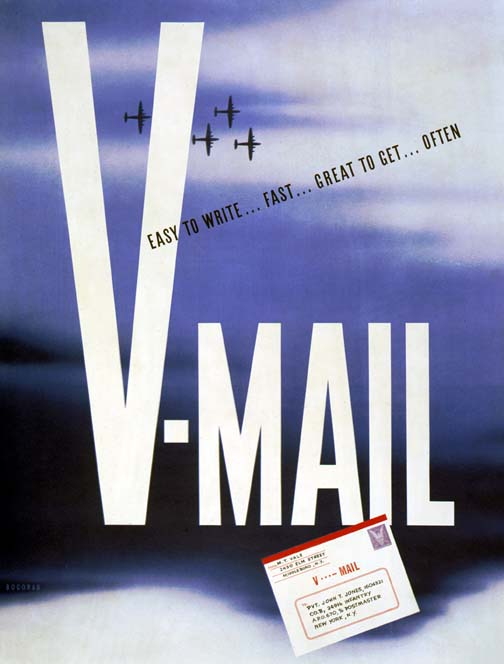
Poster from World War II promoting the use of V-mail

V-mail, short for Victory Mail, was a hybrid mail process used by the United States during the Second World War as the primary and secure method to correspond with soldiers stationed abroad. To reduce the cost of transferring an original letter through the military postal system, a V-mail letter would be censored, copied to film, and printed back to paper upon arrival at its destination. The V-mail process is based on the earlier British Airgraph process.

== Operation and function ==
V-mail letter written July 1943

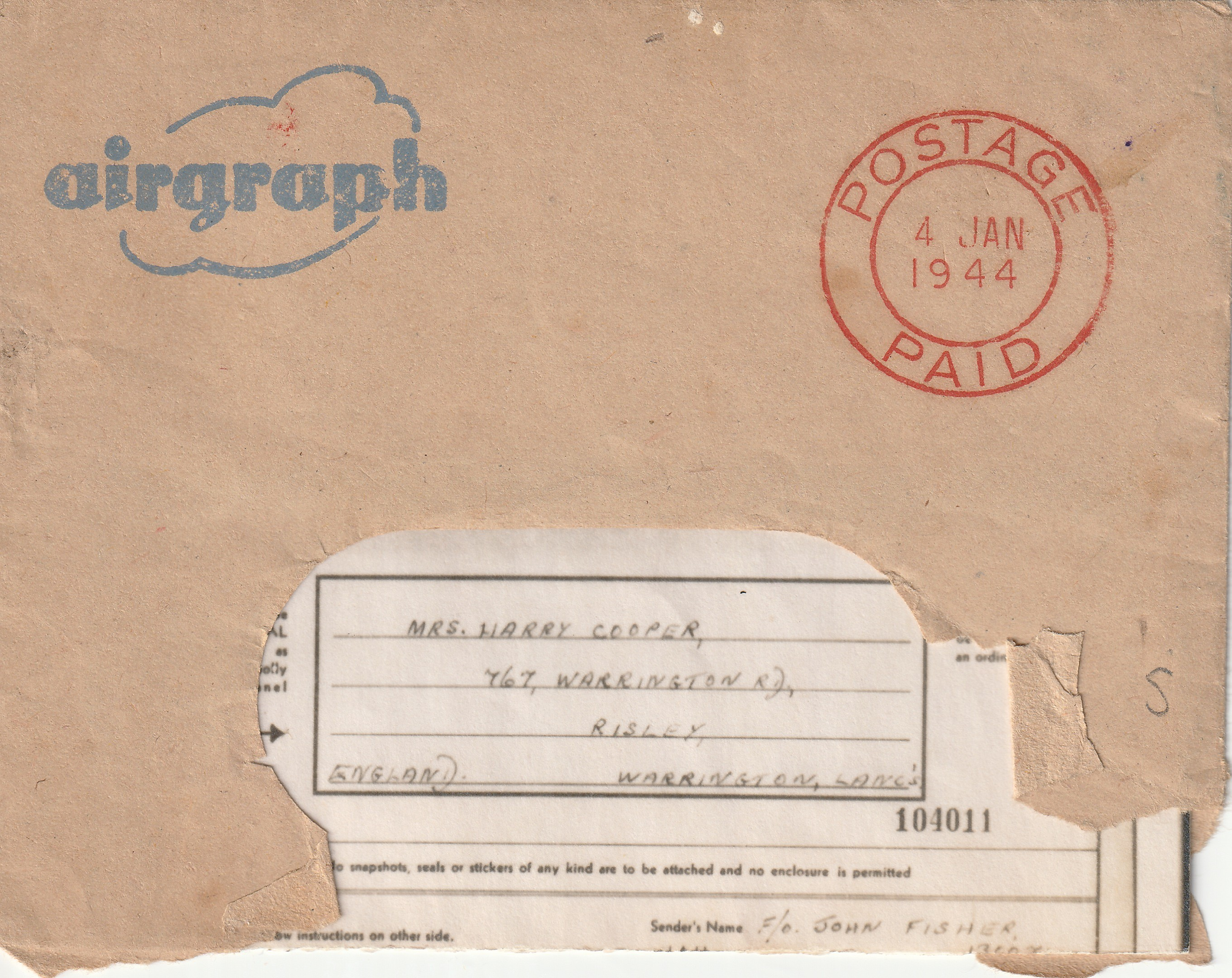
An Airgraph postmarked 4th January, 1944

V-mail envelope with V-mail symbol, March 1943

V-mail correspondence was on small letter sheets, 17.8 by 23.2 cm (7 by 9 1/8 in), that would go through mail censors before being photographed and transported as thumbnail-sized image in negative microfilm. Upon arrival to their destination, the negatives would be printed. The final print was 67% of the original document's size, creating a sheet 10.7 by 13.2 cm (4 1/4 by 5 1/4 in).

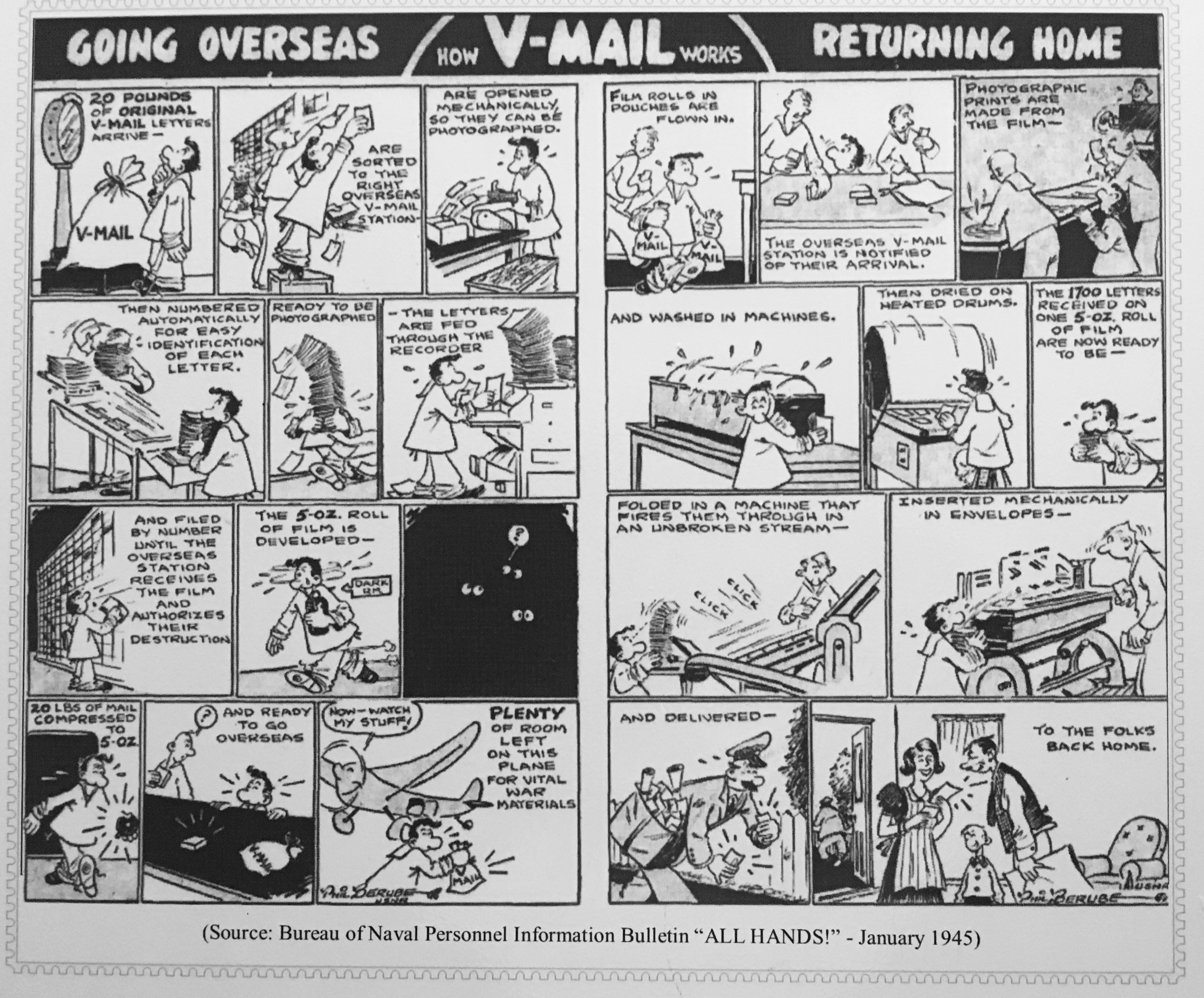
Explanation of V-Mail System in Display aboard USS Alabama (BB 60), Mobile, Alabama

According to the National Postal Museum, "V-mail ensured that thousands of tons of shipping space could be reserved for war materials. The 37 mail bags required to carry 150,000 one-page letters could be replaced by a single mail sack. The weight of that same amount of mail was reduced dramatically from 2,575 pounds to a mere 45." This saved considerable weight and bulk in a time in which both were hard to manage in a combat zone.

In addition to postal censorship, V-mail also deterred espionage communications by foiling the use of invisible ink, microdots, and microprinting, none of which would be reproduced in a photocopy.

== British 'Airgraph' ==
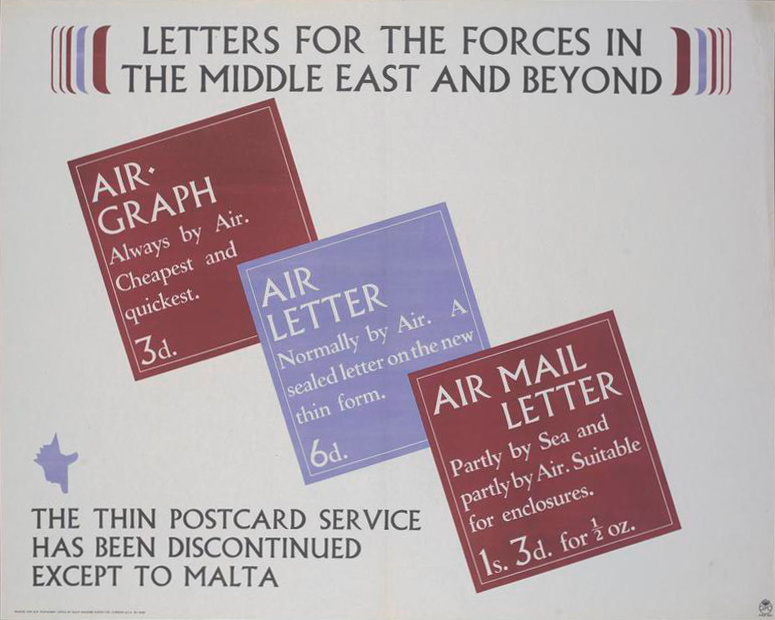
Advertisement explaining the difference between airgraph, air letter and airmail

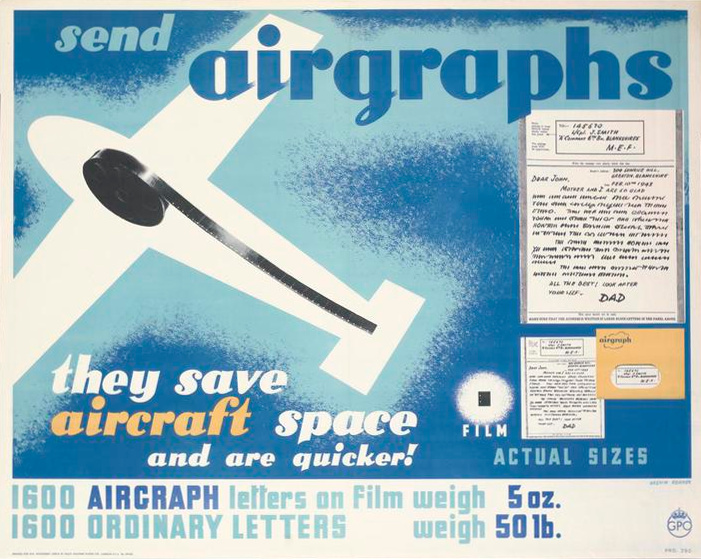

The airgraph was invented in the 1930s by the Eastman Kodak Company in conjunction with Imperial Airways (now British Airways) and Pan-American Airways as a means of reducing the weight and bulk of mail carried by air. The airgraph forms, upon which the letter was written, were photographed and then sent as negatives on rolls of microfilm. A General Post Office (GPO) poster of the time claimed that 1,600 letters on film weighed just 5 oz (140 g), while 1,600 ordinary letters weighed 50 lb (23 kg). At their destination, the negatives were printed on photographic paper and delivered as airgraph letters through the normal Royal Engineers (Postal Section) – also known as the Army Postal Services (APS) – systems.

In 1940, the British Minister of Transport, Lieutenant Colonel John Moore-Brabazon, 1st Baron Brabazon of Tara, put forward the idea that airgraphs be used to reduce both the bulk and weight of mail travelling between the Middle East Force (MEF) and the UK. The matter was referred to the APS and the GPO, who jointly investigated the possibility of using airgraphs. This eventually led to a service being instituted between England and Egypt in 1941 when 70,000 airgraphs were sent in the first batch and took three weeks to reach their destination.

Kodak had offices in Cairo that were capable of processing airgraph negatives, but it was not until the appropriate equipment arrived from America to their Cairo office that the APS was able to provide a return service to the UK.

In the theatres of war, the whole airgraph operation was coordinated by the APS. Completed airgraph forms were collected by the A/FPOs and forwarded to the Kodak processing plants, which were co-located with the Base APOs.

The use of the airgraph was not rationed and its postage was also set at three pence (3d). Although the airgraph proved to be immediately popular, its use was limited because of its size (approx; 11cm x 13cm; 4" x 5") and lack of privacy, so when sufficient aircraft capacity became available, its use declined in favour of the air letter.

The airgraph service was later extended to: Canada (1941), East Africa (1941), Burma (1942), India (1942), South Africa (1942), Australia (1943), New Zealand (1943), Ceylon (1944), and Italy (1944).

== Historical antecedents ==
The U.S. military's V-mail was based on British Airgraphs, which were based on Eastman Kodak's patent obtained from New York City banker George McCarthy. Prior to that, a similar system was deployed during the Franco-Prussian War which used carrier pigeons to send primitive microfilm strips across German lines, developed from French optician René Dagron's first patent granted for microfilm in 1859. Dagron's microfilm patent was additionally based on British scientist John Benjamin Dancer, who created microfilm in 1839.

== In literature ==
The narrator of Breakfast at Tiffany's takes to going through the trash-basket outside his neighbour Holly Golightly's door:

The same source made it evident that she received V-letters by the bale. They were always torn into strips like bookmarks. I used occasionally to pluck myself a bookmark in passing. Remember and miss you and rain and please write and damn and goddamn were the words that recurred most often on these slips; those, and lonesome and love.

== See also ==
- Airmail
- British Forces Post Office
- History of the British Army postal service
- Hybrid mail
- Microform
- Military mail
- Print-to-mail

== Bibliography ==
- Fletcher, Julius and Hartwig Danesch. The civilian airgraph service in Palestine, 1941-1945. Rickmansworth: British Association of Palestine-Israel Philatelists, 1983 ISBN 0950557137 76p.
- Keeton, E.H. Airgraph: A Detailed Handbook on the Airgraph with Indications of the Value. King's Lynn: E. Keeton, 1987 263p.
- Smithsonian Magazine, March, 1994, Around the Mall, vol 24:12 pg 16
- Smithsonian Magazine, May, 2004, "V - as in Victory Mail", pg 38
