= Double Geneva =

Rare Swiss postage stamp

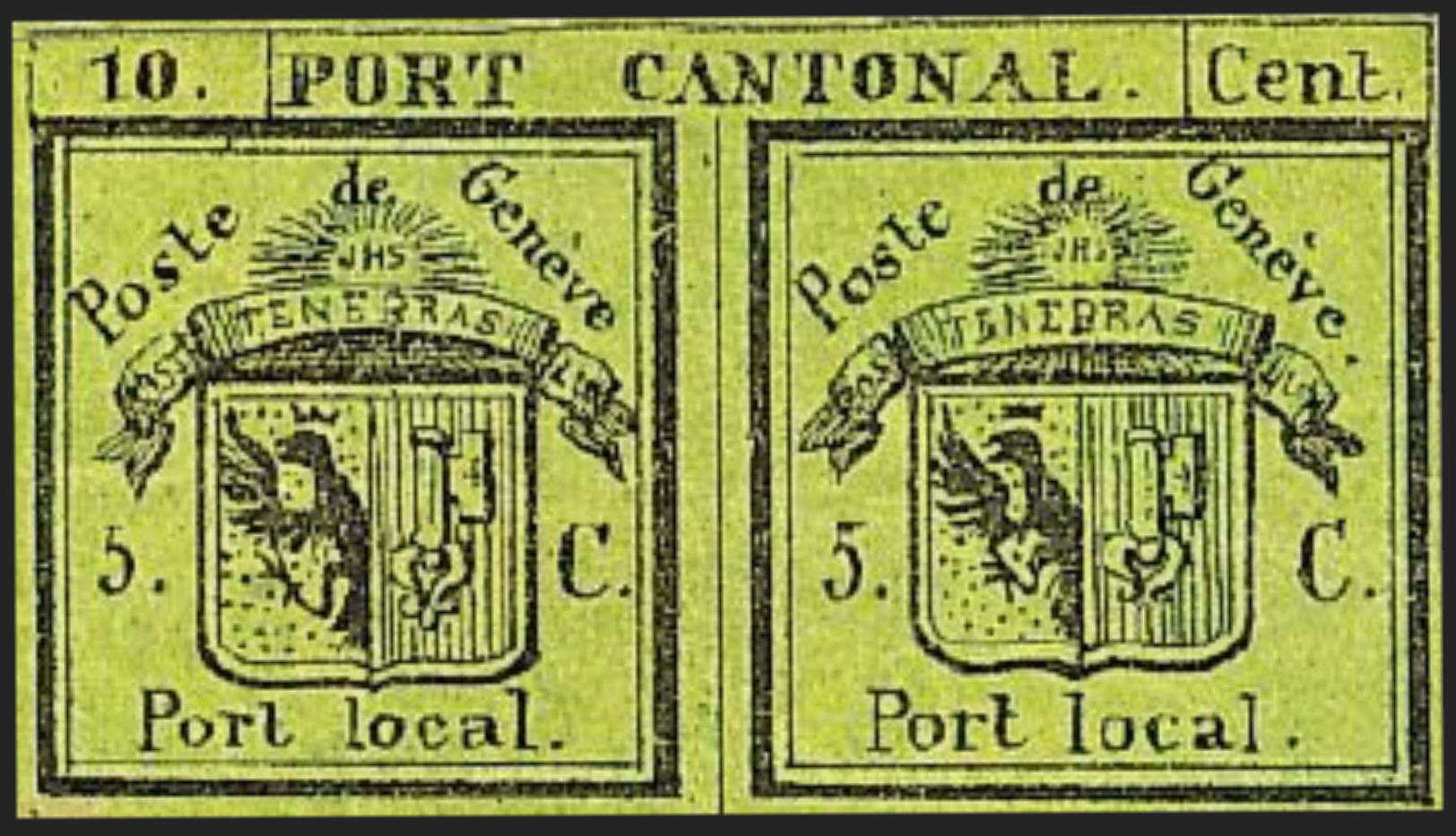
- Country of production: Switzerland
- Location of production: Geneva
- Date of production: 30 September 1843
- Nature of rarity: Extremely rare
- No. in existence: Unknown
- Face value: 5/10 centimes
- Estimated value: CHF 55,000

The Double Geneva is a rare Swiss stamp that was issued by the city of Geneva in 1843, making it the third-oldest stamp of the European continent after the Zürich 4 and 6 (1842), and the British Penny Black and Two Penny Blue, (1840). It bears the name Double Geneva for the double image on the stamp and its place of origin.

The stamp has a unique design: each half, at 5 centimes if cut out would pre-pay the postage on letters within the city of Geneva; the whole stamp at 10 centimes pre-paid postage outside the city but within the Canton of Geneva.
