= NAPM =

NAPM is an acronym which can stand for:

- National Academy of Popular Music
- National Alliance of People's Movements, an organization in India
- National Association of Presort Mailers
- National Association of Purchasing Management
- National Association of Photographic Manufacturers
