= Mail =

System for transporting documents and other small packages

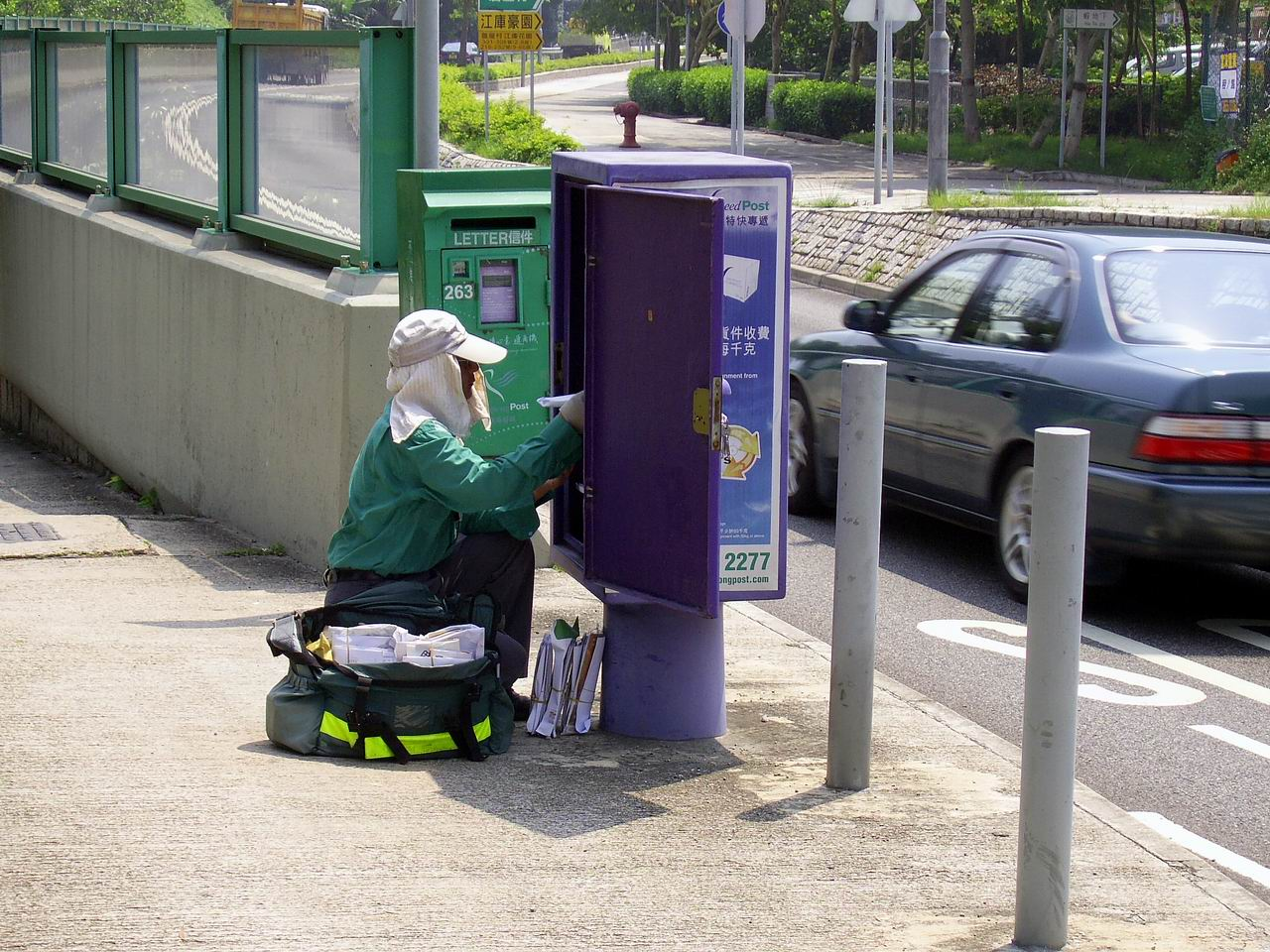
A postman collecting mail for delivery in Hong Kong, 2008

The mail, or post, is a system for physically transporting postcards, letters, and parcels. A postal service can be private or public, though many governments place restrictions on private systems. Since the mid-19th century, national postal systems have generally been established as a government monopoly, with a fee on the article prepaid. Proof of payment is usually in the form of an adhesive postage stamp, but a postage meter is also used for bulk mailing.

Postal authorities often have functions aside from transporting letters. In some countries, a postal, telegraph and telephone (PTT) service oversees the postal system, in addition to telephone and telegraph systems. Some countries' postal systems allow for savings accounts and handle applications for passports.

The Universal Postal Union (UPU), established in 1874, includes 192 member countries and sets the rules for international mail exchanges as a Specialized Agency of the United Nations.

== Etymology ==
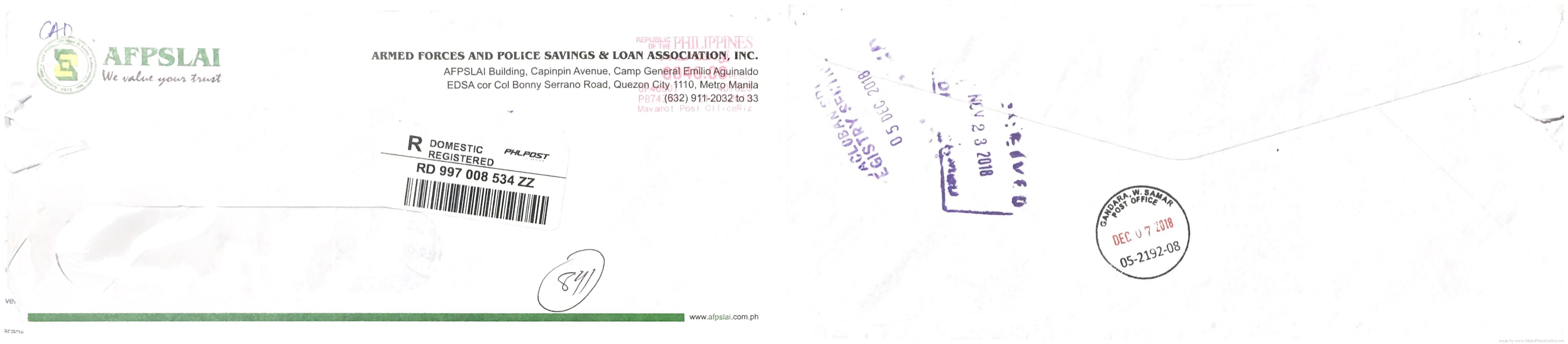
Mail envelope (back to back), Philippine Postal Corporation, 2019

The word mail comes from the Middle English word male, referring to a travelling bag or pack. It was spelled in that manner until the 17th century and is distinct from the word male in reference to the biological sex and gender. The word is cognate with French malle ('trunk or large box') and mála ('a bag', whence mála spíosrach 'spice bag'). In the 17th century, the word mail began to appear as a reference for a bag that contained letters: "bag full of letter" (1654). Over the next hundred years the word mail began to be applied strictly to the letters themselves and the sack as the mailbag. In the 19th century, the British typically used mail to refer to letters being sent abroad (i.e. on a ship) and post to refer to letters for domestic delivery. The word post is derived from Old French poste, which ultimately stems from the past participle of the Latin verb ponere 'to lay down or place'. So in the U.K., the Royal Mail delivers the post, while in North America both the U.S. Postal Service and Canada Post deliver the mail.

The term email, short for "electronic mail", first appeared in the 1970s. The term snail mail is a retronym to distinguish it from the quicker email. Various dates have been given for its first use.

== History ==
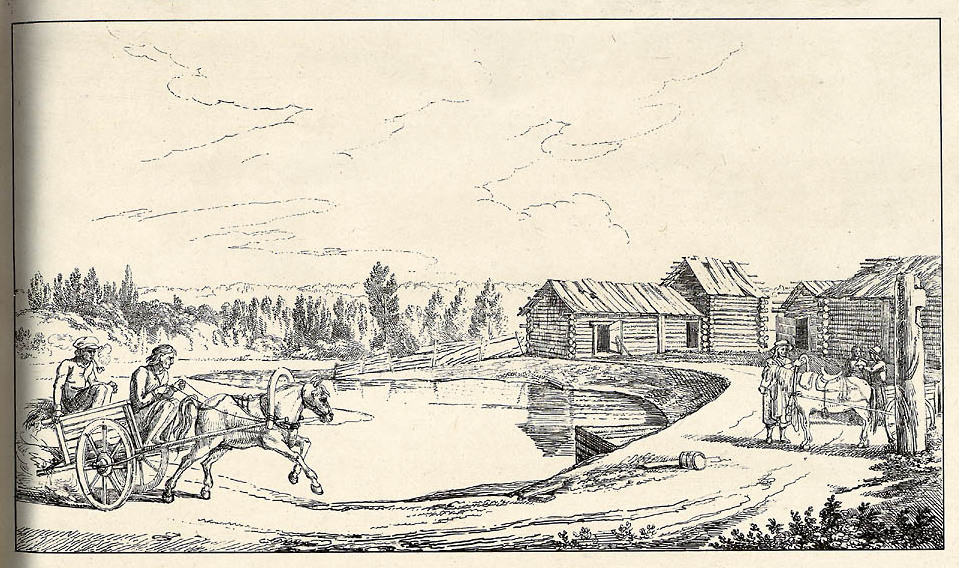
Many early post systems consisted of fixed courier routes, as seen in this 1832 depiction of a post house on a route in Finland.

The practice of communication by written documents carried by an intermediary from one person or place to another almost certainly dates back nearly to the invention of writing. However, the development of formal postal systems occurred much later. The first documented use of an organized courier service for the dissemination of written documents is in Egypt, where Pharaohs used couriers to send out decrees throughout the territory of the state (2400 BCE). The earliest surviving piece of mail is also Egyptian, dating to 255 BCE.

=== Iran ===
The first credible claim for the development of a real postal system comes from the Achaemenid Empire. The best-documented claim, by the Greek historian Xenophon, attributes the invention to the Persian king Cyrus the Great (550 BCE), who mandated that every province in his kingdom would organize reception and delivery of post to each of its citizens. Other writers credit his successor Darius the Great (521 BCE), who reorganized and rebuilt the Royal Road to facilitate the rapid travel of Persian couriers from Susa (now Iran) in the east to Sardis (now Turkey) in the west. Other sources claim much earlier dates for a postal system under the Assyrians, with credit given to Hammurabi (1700 BCE) and Sargon II (722 BCE). Mail may not have been the primary mission of this postal service, however. The role of the system as an intelligence-gathering apparatus is well documented, and the service was (later) called angariae, a term that in time came to indicate a tax system. The Book of Esther in the Hebrew Bible makes mention of this system: Persian king Ahasuerus used couriers to relay his decisions across the Near East.

The Persian system worked using stations called Chapar Khaneh (Persian: چاپارخانه), whence the message carrier (the Chapar) would ride to the next post, whereupon he would swap his horse with a fresh one for maximum performance and delivery speed. The Greek historian Herodotus described the system in this way: "It is said that as many days as there are in the whole journey, so many are the men and horses that stand along the road, each horse and man at the interval of a day's journey; and these are stayed neither by snow nor rain nor heat nor darkness from accomplishing their appointed course with all speed". The verse prominently features on James Farley Post Office in New York City, although it uses the translation "Neither snow nor rain nor heat nor gloom of night stays these couriers from the swift completion of their appointed rounds". The ancient Persian postal service system greatly influenced the Greco-Roman world such that its model was adapted by the Roman Empire as the cursus publicus.

=== India ===
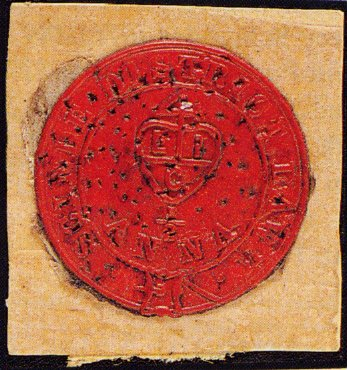
The use of adhesive stamps and sealing wax to signify prepayment of postage began with the Scinde Dawk of British India on 1 July 1852, as part of a comprehensive reform of the postal system in Scinde under the East India Company.

The economic growth and political stability under the Mauryan Empire (322–185 BCE) stimulated sustained development of civil infrastructure in ancient India. The Mauryans developed early Indian mail service as well as public wells, rest houses, and other facilities for the public. Common chariots called Dagana were sometimes used as mail chariots in ancient India. Couriers were used militarily by kings and local rulers to deliver information through runners and other carriers. The postmaster, the head of the intelligence service, was responsible for ensuring the maintenance of the courier system. Couriers were also used to deliver personal letters.

In South India, the Wodeyar dynasty (1399–1947) of the Kingdom of Mysore used mail service for espionage purposes thereby acquiring knowledge related to matters that took place at great distances.

By the end of the 18th century, a postal system in India was in operation. Later this system underwent complete modernization when the British Raj established its control over most of India. The Post Office Act XVII of 1837 provided that the Governor-General of India in Council had the exclusive right of conveying letters by post for hire within the territories of the East India Company. The mails were available to certain officials without charge, which became a controversial privilege as the years passed. On this basis the Indian Post Office was established on October 1, 1837.

=== Rome ===
The first well-documented postal service was that of Rome. Organized at the time of Augustus Caesar (62 BCE – 14 CE), the service was called cursus publicus and was provided with light carriages (rhedæ) pulled by fast horses. By the time of Diocletian, a parallel service was established with two-wheeled carts (birotæ) pulled by oxen. This service was reserved for government correspondence. Yet another service for citizens was later added.

=== Vietnam ===
In 1802, the first Vietnamese postal service was established under the Nguyen dynasty, under the Ministry of Rites. During the Nguyen dynasty, official documents were transported by horse and other primitive means to stations built about 25–30 kilometers apart. In 1904, three wireless communication offices were established, and in early 1906 they were merged with the postal service to form the Post and Wireless Office. In 1945, after the August Revolution, the Post and Wireless Office was renamed the Post Office under the Ministry of Transportation. In 1955, the Post Office was upgraded to the Ministry of Post.

=== China ===
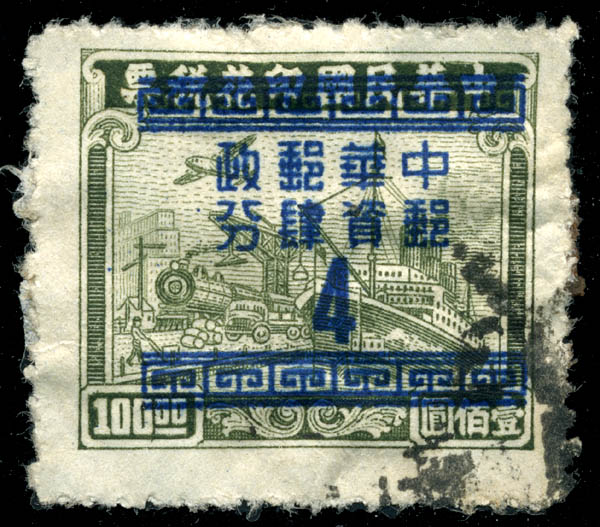
Chinese postage stamp: 4-cent on 100-dollar silver overprint of 1949

Some Chinese sources claim mail or postal systems dating back to the Xia or Shang dynasties, which would be the oldest mailing service in the world. The earliest credible system of couriers was initiated by the Han dynasty (206 BCE – 220 CE), who had relay stations every 30 li (about 15 km) along major routes.

The Tang dynasty (618 to 907 AD) operated a recorded 1,639 posthouses, including maritime offices, employing around 20,000 people. The system was administered by the Ministry of War and private correspondence was forbidden from the network. The Ming dynasty (1368 to 1644) sought a postal system to deliver mail quickly, securely, and cheaply. Adequate speed was always a problem, because of the slow overland transportation system, and underfunding. Its network had 1,936 posthouses every 60 li along major routes, with fresh horses available every 10 li between them. The Qing operated 1,785 posthouses throughout their lands. More efficient, however, was the system linking the international settlements, centered around Shanghai and the Treaty ports. It was the main communication system for China's international trade.

=== Mongol Empire ===
Genghis Khan installed an empire-wide messenger and postal station system named Örtöö within the Mongol Empire. During the Yuan dynasty under Kublai Khan, this system also covered the territory of China. Postal stations were used not only for the transmission and delivery of official mail but were also available for travelling officials, military men, and foreign dignitaries. These stations aided and facilitated the transport of foreign and domestic tribute specifically and the conduct of trade in general.

By the end of Kublai Khan's rule, there were more than 1400 postal stations in China alone, which in turn had at their disposal about 50,000 horses, 1,400 oxen, 6,700 mules, 400 carts, 6,000 boats, more than 200 dogs, and 1,150 sheep.

The stations were 25 to 65 km (16 to 40 mi) apart and had reliable attendants working for the mail service. Foreign observers, such as Marco Polo, have attested to the efficiency of this early postal system.

Each station was maintained by up to twenty five families. Work for postal service counted as military service. The system was still operational in 18th century when 64 stations were required for a message to cross Mongolia from the Altai Mountains to China.

=== Japan ===
The modern Japanese system was developed in the mid-19th century, closely copying European models. Japan was highly innovative in developing the world's largest and most successful postal savings system and later a postal life insurance system as well. Postmasters play a key role in linking the Japanese political system to local politics. A postmaster's position is in high prestige, and is often hereditary. To a large extent, the postal system generated the enormous funding necessary to rapidly industrialize Japan in the late 19th century.

=== Korea ===
The postal service was one of Korea's first attempts at modernization. The Joseon Post Office was established in 1884.

=== Other systems ===
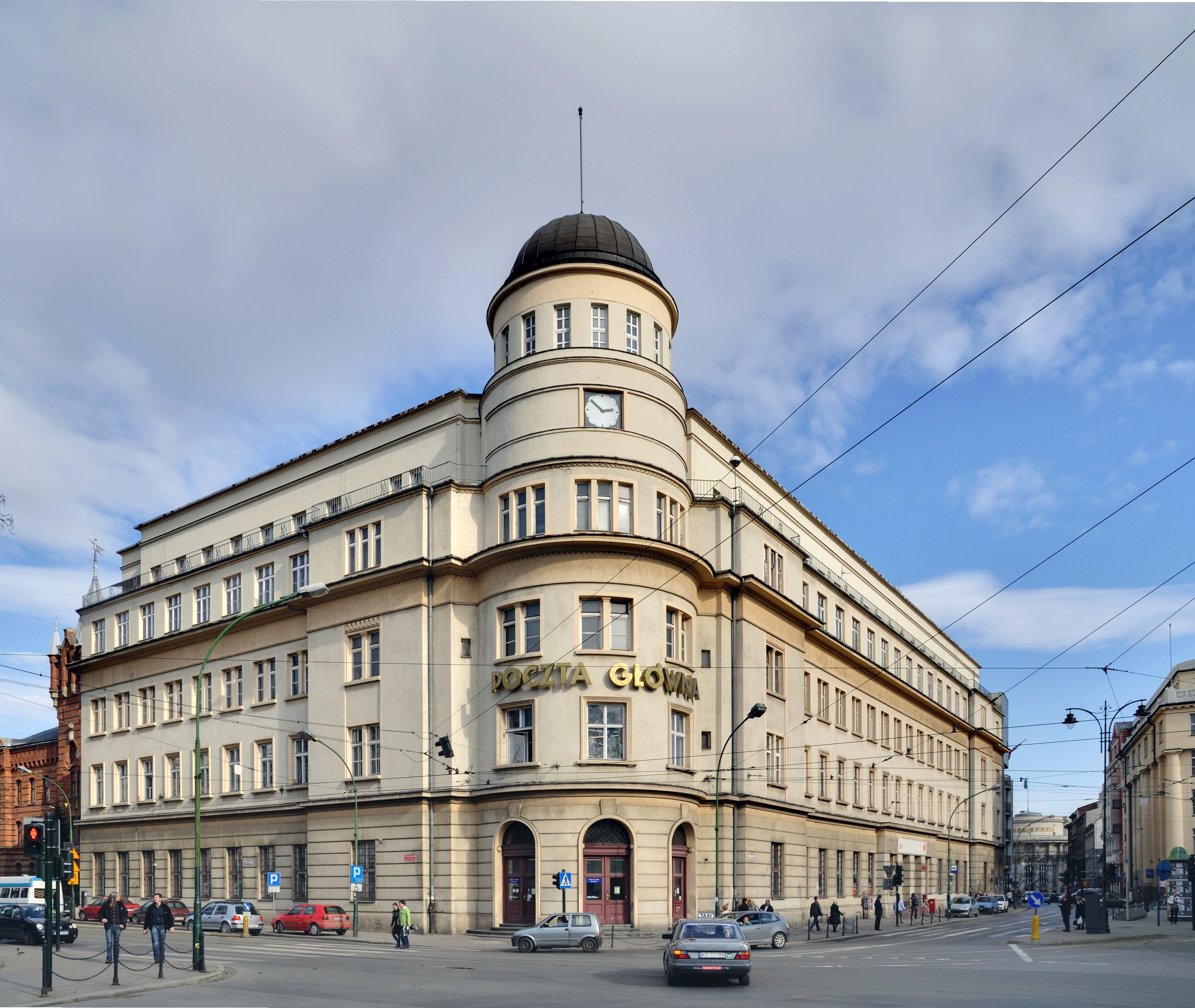
Example of a main post office building in the Polish city of Kraków, 2012

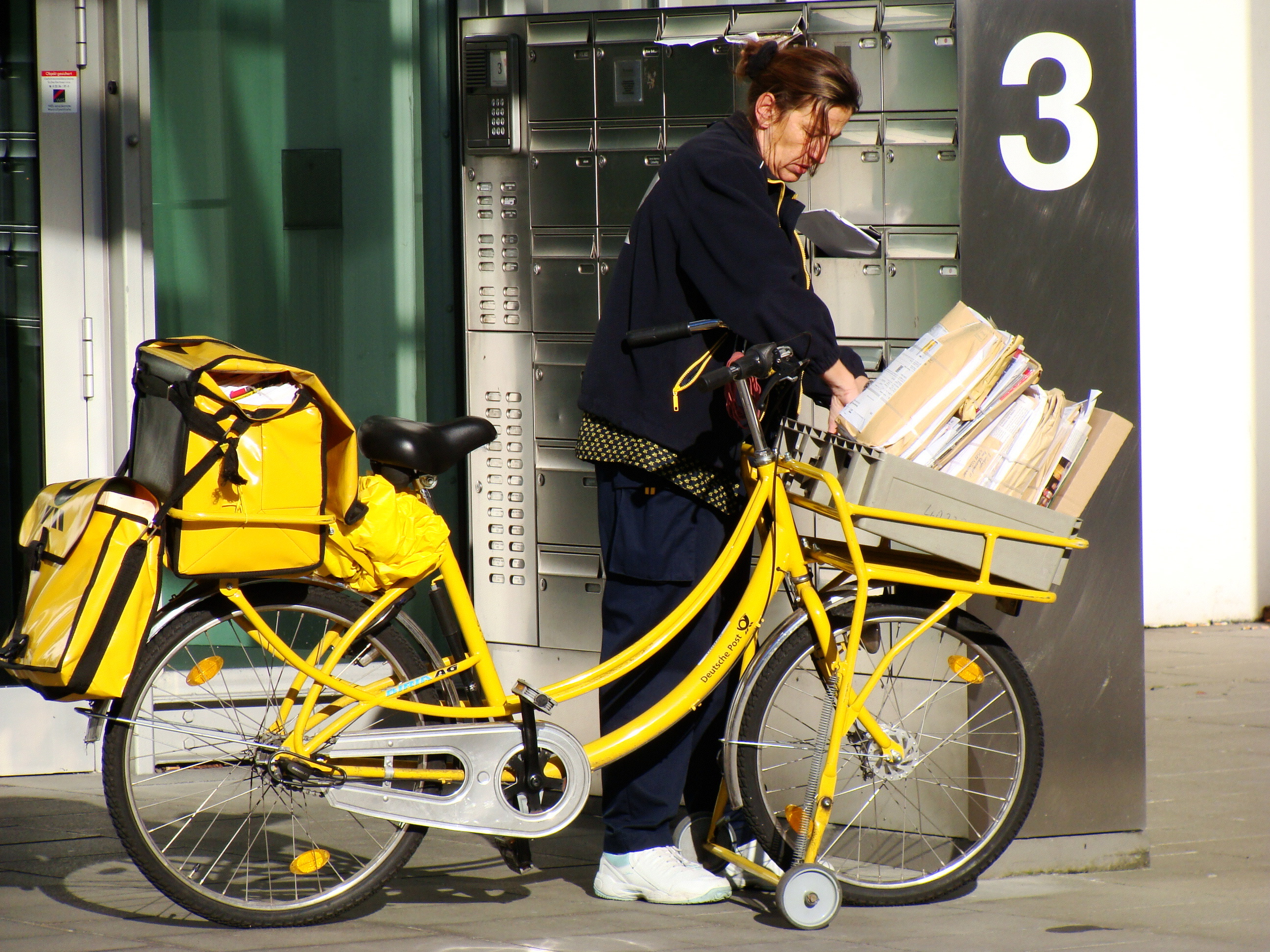
Mail delivery by bicycle in the German city of Cologne, 2008

Another important postal service was created in the Islamic world by the caliph Mu'awiyya; the service was called barid, for the name of the towers built to protect the roads by which couriers travelled.

By 3000 BC, Egypt was using homing pigeons for pigeon post, taking advantage of a singular quality of this bird, which when taken far from its nest is able to find its way home due to a particularly developed sense of orientation. Messages were then tied around the legs of the pigeon, which was freed and could reach its original nest. By the 19th century, homing pigeons were used extensively for military communications.

Charlemagne extended to the whole territory of his empire the system used by Franks in northern Gaul and connected this service with that of missi dominici.

In the mid-11th century, flax traders known as the Cairo Geniza Merchants from Fustat, Egypt wrote about using a postal service known as the kutubi. The kutubi system managed routes between the cities of Jerusalem, Ramla, Tyre, Ascalon, Damascus, Aleppo, and Fustat with year-round, regular mail delivery.

Many religious orders had a private mail service. Notably, the Cistercians had one which connected more than 6,000 abbeys, monasteries, and churches. The best organization, however, was created by the Knights Templar.

In 1716, Correos y Telégrafos was established in Spain as public mail service, available to all citizens. Delivery postmen were first employed in 1756 and post boxes were installed firstly in 1762.

=== Thurn und Taxis ===
In 1505, Holy Roman Emperor Maximilian I established a postal system in the Empire, appointing Franz von Taxis to run it. This system, originally the Kaiserliche Reichspost, is often considered the first modern postal service in the world, which initiated a revolution in communication in Europe. The system combined contemporary technical and organization means to create a stable transcontinental service which was also the first to offer (fee-based) public access.

The Thurn und Taxis family, then known as Tassis, had operated postal services between Italian city-states from 1290 onward.

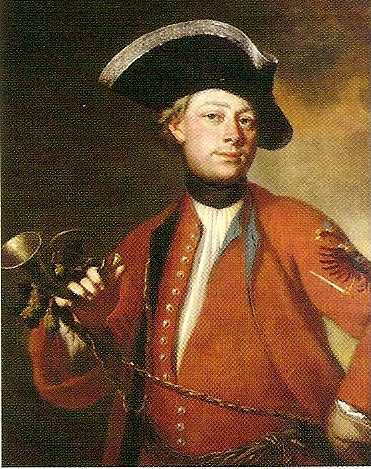
Postmaster Anselm Franz, 2nd Prince of Thurn and Taxis (1681–1739), still today part of the logo of the white pages in many countries

For 500 years the postal business based in Brussels and in Frankfurt was passed from one generation to another. Following the abolition of the Empire in 1806, the Thurn-und-Taxis Post system continued as a private organization into the postage stamp era before being absorbed into the postal system of the new German Empire after 1871.

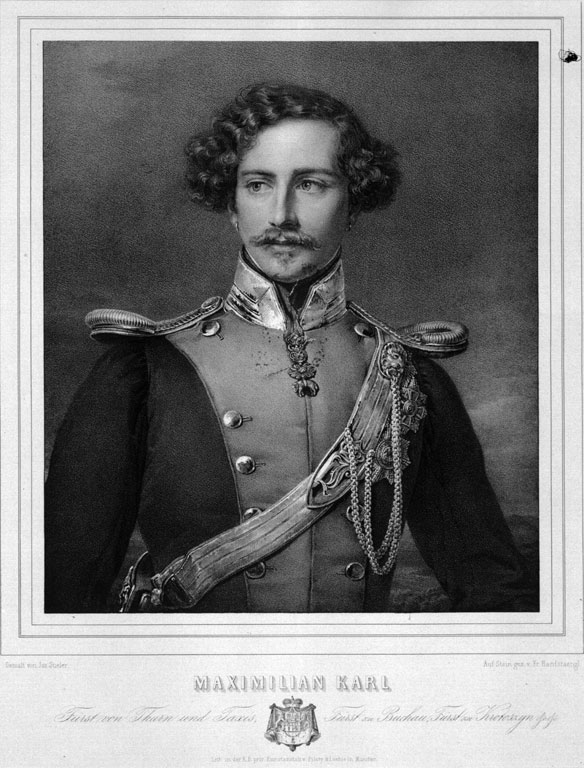
Maximilian Karl, 6th Prince of Thurn and Taxis (1802–1871), last Postmaster

1 July 1867, the State of Prussia had to make a compensation payment of three million Thalers reinvested by Helene von Thurn & Taxis, daughter-in-law of the last postmaster, Maximilian Karl, 6th Prince of Thurn and Taxis, into real estate, most of it continuing to exist today.

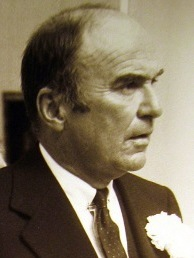
Johannes, 11th Prince of Thurn & Taxis (1926–1990), heir of the Postal fortune

=== Postal reforms ===
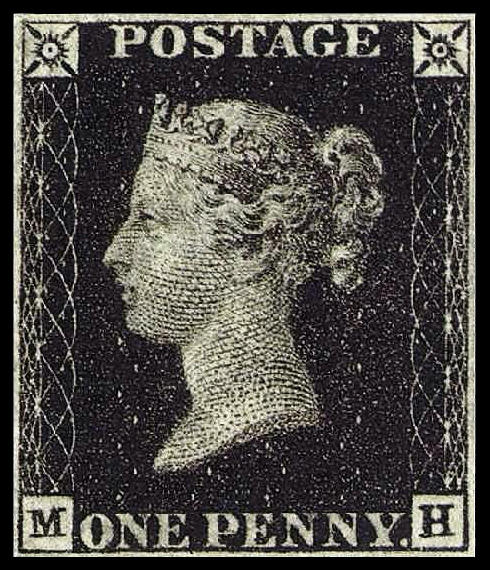
The Penny Black, the world's first adhesive postage stamp, issued in the United Kingdom in 1840

In the United Kingdom, prior to 1840 letters were paid for by the recipient and the cost was determined by the distance from sender to recipient and the number of sheets of paper rather than by a countrywide flat rate with weight restrictions. Sir Rowland Hill reformed the postal system based on the concepts of penny postage and prepayment. In his proposal, Hill also called for official pre-printed envelopes and adhesive postage stamps as alternative ways of getting the sender to pay for the postage, at a time when prepayment was optional, which led to the invention of the postage stamp, the Penny Black.

=== Modern transport and technology ===
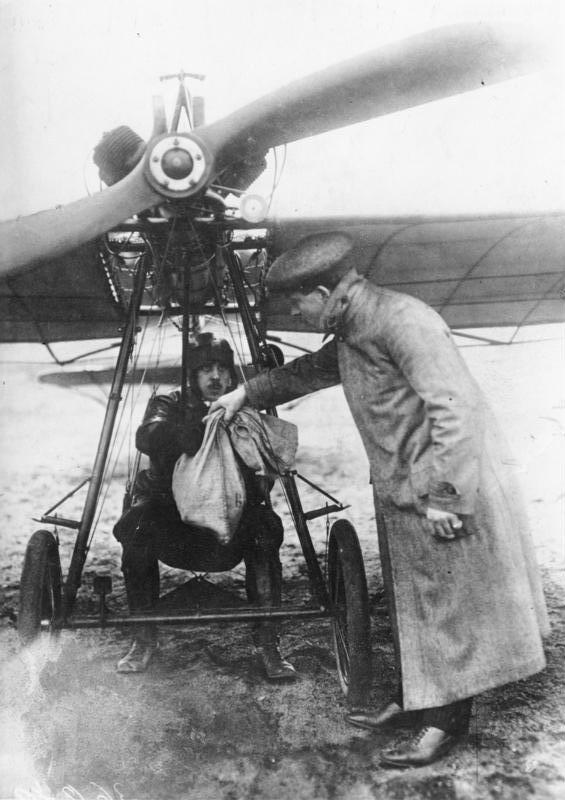
The first airmail service in the German Empire, 1912

The postal system was important in the development of modern transportation. Railways carried railway post offices. During the 20th century, air mail became the transport of choice for inter-continental mail. Postmen started to use mail trucks. The handling of mail became increasingly automated.

The Internet came to change the conditions for physical mail. Email (and in recent years social networking sites) became a fierce competitor to physical mail systems, but online auctions and Internet shopping opened new business opportunities as people often get items bought online through the mail.

== Modern mail ==
Modern mail is organized by national and privatized services, which are reciprocally connected by international regulations, organizations and international agreements. Paper letters and parcels can be sent to almost any country in the world relatively easily and cheaply. The Internet has made the process of sending letter-like messages nearly instantaneous, and in many cases and situations correspondents use email where they previously would have used letters. The volume of paper mail sent through the U.S. Postal Service has declined by more than 15% since its peak at 213 billion pieces per annum in 2006.

=== Organization ===
Some countries have organized their mail services as public limited liability corporations without a legal monopoly.

The worldwide postal system constituting the individual national postal systems of the world's self-governing states is coordinated by the Universal Postal Union, which among other things sets international postage rates, defines standards for postage stamps and operates the system of international reply coupons.

In most countries a system of codes has been created (referred to as ZIP codes in the United States, postcodes in the United Kingdom and Australia, eircodes in Ireland and postal codes in most other countries) in order to facilitate the automation of operations. This also includes placing additional marks on the address portion of the letter or mailed object, called "bar coding". Bar coding of mail for delivery is usually expressed either by a series of vertical bars, usually called POSTNET coding or a block of dots as a two-dimensional barcode. The "block of dots" method allows for the encoding of proof of payment of postage, exact routing for delivery, and other features.

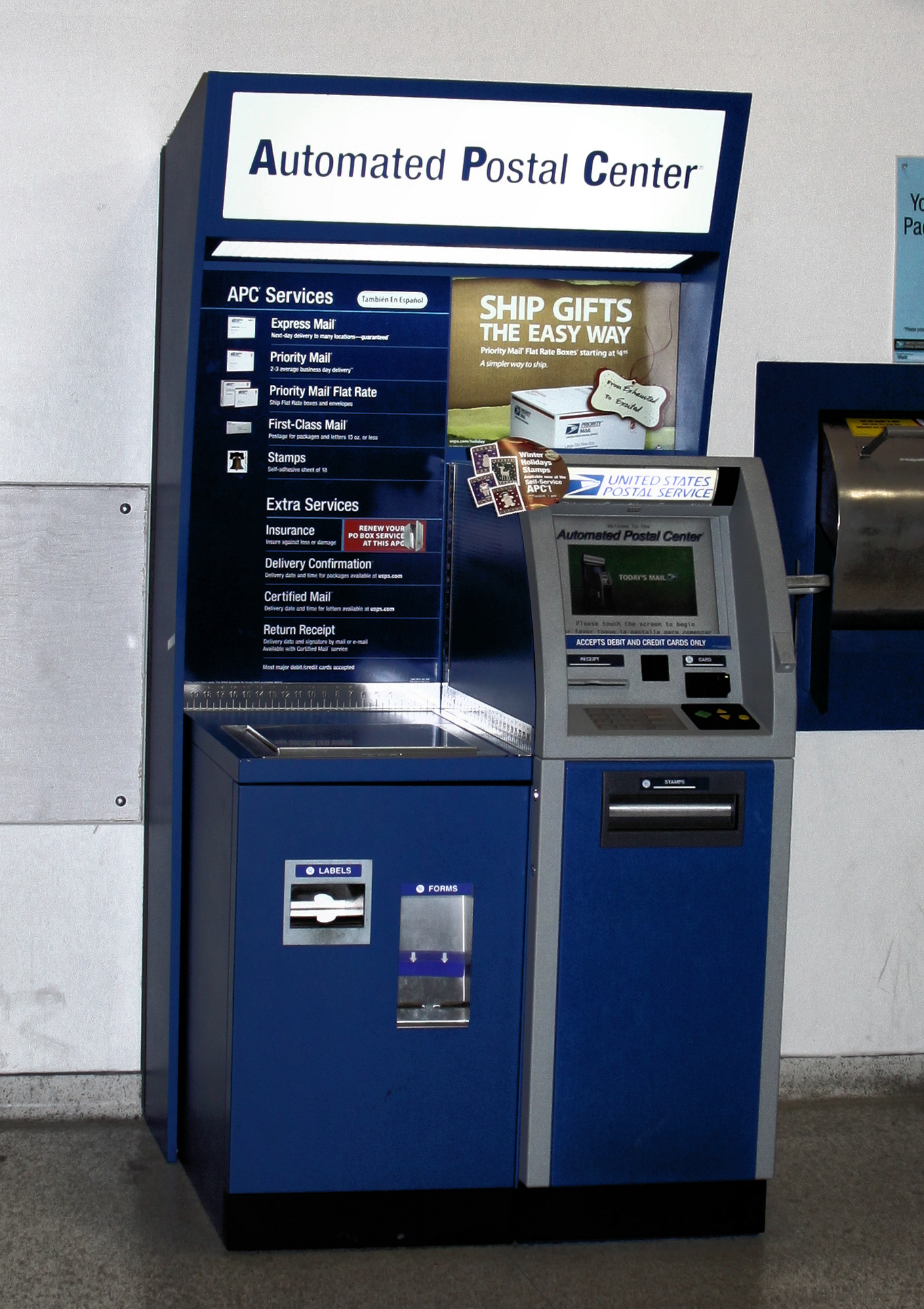
An automated postal machine of the United States Postal Service in Webster, Texas, 2009

The ordinary mail service was improved in the 20th century with the use of planes for a quicker delivery. The world's first scheduled airmail post service took place in the United Kingdom between the London suburbs of Hendon and Windsor, Berkshire, on 9 September 1911. Some methods of airmail proved ineffective, however, including the United States Postal Service's experiment with rocket mail.

Receipt services were made available in order to grant the sender a confirmation of effective delivery.

=== Payment ===
Before about the mid-nineteenth century, in regions where postal systems existed, the payment models varied, but most mail was sent unpaid requiring the recipient to pay the postage fee. In some regions a partial payment was made by the sender. Today, worldwide, the most common method of prepaying postage is by buying an adhesive postage stamp to be applied to the envelope before mailing; a much less common method is to use a postage-prepaid envelope. Franking is a method of creating postage-prepaid envelopes under licence using a special machine. They are used by companies with large mail programs, such as banks and direct mail companies.

In 1998, the U.S. Postal Service authorised the first tests of a secure system of sending digital franks via the Internet to be printed out on a PC printer, obviating the necessity to license a dedicated franking machine and allowing companies with smaller mail programs to make use of the option; this was later expanded to test the use of personalized postage. The service provided by the U.S. Postal Service in 2003 allows the franks to be printed out on special adhesive-backed labels.

In 2004 the Royal Mail in the United Kingdom introduced its SmartStamp Internet-based system, allowing printing on ordinary adhesive labels or envelopes. Similar systems are being considered by postal administrations around the world.

When the pre-paid envelope or package is accepted into the mail by an agent of the postal service, the agent usually indicates by means of a cancellation that it is no longer valid for pre-payment of postage. The exceptions are when the agent forgets or neglects to cancel the mailpiece, for stamps that are pre-cancelled and thus do not require cancellation and for, in most cases, metered mail. (The "personalized stamps" authorized by the USPS and manufactured by Zazzle and other companies are in fact a form of meter label and thus do not need to be cancelled.)

=== Privacy and censorship ===
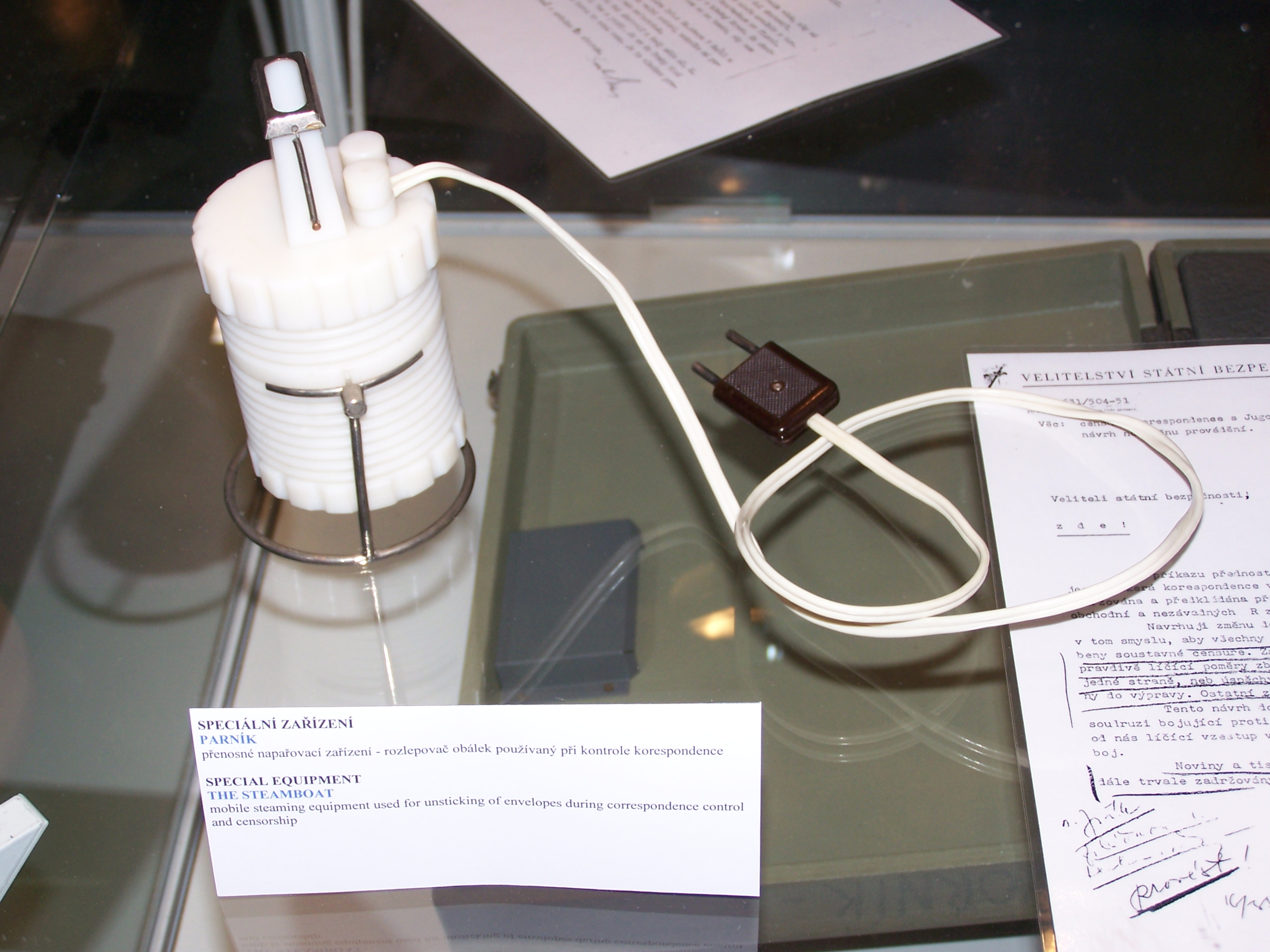
Mobile steaming equipment ("The Steamboat") used by the State Security of the former Czechoslovakia to unstick mail envelopes for correspondence surveillance during the Cold War.

Documents are generally not read by anyone other than the addressee; for example, in the U.S. it is a violation of federal law for anyone other than the addressee and the government to open mail. There are exceptions, however: executives often assign secretaries or assistants the task of handling their mail; and postcards do not require opening and can be read by anyone. For mail contained within an envelope, there are legal provisions in some jurisdictions allowing the recording of identities of sender and recipient.

The privacy of correspondence is guaranteed by the constitutions of Mexico, Colombia, Brazil and Venezuela, and is alluded to in the European Convention on Human Rights and the Universal Declaration of Human Rights. The control of the contents inside private citizens' mail is censorship and concerns social, political, and legal aspects of civil rights. International mail and packages are subject to customs control, with the mail and packages often surveyed and their contents sometimes edited.

There have been cases of governments opening and copying or photographing the contents of private mail. Subject to the laws in the relevant jurisdiction, correspondence may be openly or covertly opened, or the contents determined via some other method, by the police or other authorities in some cases relating to a suspected criminal conspiracy, although black chambers (largely in the past, though there is apparently some continuance of their use today) opened extralegally.

The mail service may be allowed to open the mail if neither addressee nor sender can be located, in order to attempt to locate either. Mail service may also open the mail to inspect if it contains materials that are hazardous to transport or violate local laws.

While in most cases mail censorship is exceptional, military mail to and from soldiers is often subject to surveillance. The mail is censored to prevent leaking tactical secrets, such as troop movements or weather conditions. Depending on the country, civilian mail containing military secrets can also be monitored and censored.

Mail sent to and from inmates in jails or prisons within the United States is subject to opening and review by jail or prison staff to determine if the mail has any criminal action dictated or provides means for an escape. The only mail that is not able to be read is attorney-client mail, which is covered under the attorney-client confidentiality laws in the United States.

=== Rise of electronic correspondence ===
Newer forms of communication, such as the telegraph, telephone, telex, facsimile, and email, have reduced the attractiveness of paper mail for many applications. These modern alternatives have some advantages: in addition to their speed, they may be more secure, e.g., because the general public cannot learn the address of the sender or recipient from the envelope, and occasionally traditional items of mail may fail to arrive, e.g. due to vandalism to mailboxes, unfriendly pets, and adverse weather conditions. Mail carriers due to perceived hazards or inconveniences, may refuse, officially or otherwise, to deliver mail to a particular address (for instance, if there is no clear path to the door or mailbox). On the other hand, traditional mail avoids the possibility of computer malfunctions and malware, and the recipient does not need to print it out if they wish to have a paper copy, though scanning is required to make a digital copy.

Physical mail is still widely used in business and personal communications for such reasons as legal requirements for signatures, requirements of etiquette, and the requirement to enclose small physical objects.

Since the advent of email, which is almost always much faster, the postal system has come to be referred to in Internet slang by the retronym "snail mail". Occasionally, the term "white mail" has also been used as a neutral term for postal mail.

Mainly during the 20th century, experimentation with hybrid mail has combined electronic and paper delivery. Electronic mechanisms include telegram, telex, facsimile (fax), email, and short message service (SMS). There have been methods which have combined mail and some of these newer methods, such as temporary emails, that combine facsimile transmission with overnight delivery. These vehicles commonly use a mechanical or electro-mechanical standardised writing (typing), that on the one hand makes for more efficient communication, while on the other hand makes impossible characteristics and practices that traditionally were in conventional mail, such as calligraphy.

This epoch is undoubtedly mainly dominated by mechanical writing, with a general use of no more of half a dozen standard typographic fonts from standard keyboards. However, the increased use of typewritten or computer-printed letters for personal communication and the advent of email have sparked renewed interest in calligraphy, as a letter has become more of a "special event". Long before email and computer-printed letters, however, decorated envelopes, rubber stamps and artistamps formed part of the medium of mail art.

In the 2000s (decade) with the advent of eBay and other online auction sites and online stores, postal services in industrialized nations have seen a major shift to item shipping. This has been seen as a boost to the system's usage in the wake of lower paper mail volume due to the accessibility of email.

Online post offices have emerged to give recipients a means of receiving traditional correspondence mail in a scanned electronic format.

Continued drops in letter volume led PostNord to stop delivering letters in Denmark at the end of 2025, and remove mailboxes from streets.

=== Collecting ===
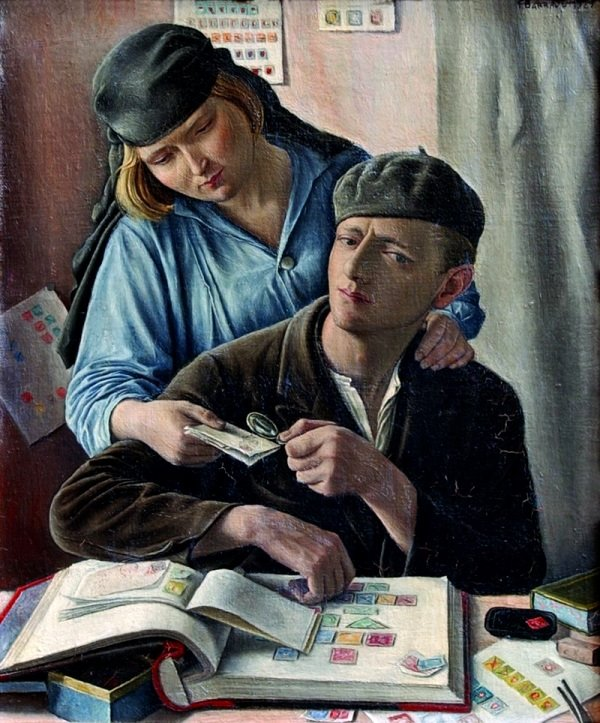
Le Philateliste by François Barraud (1929)

Postage stamps are also object of a particular form of collecting. Stamp collecting has been a very popular hobby. In some cases, when demand greatly exceeds supply, their commercial value on this specific market may become enormously greater than face value, even after use. For some postal services the sale of stamps to collectors who will never use them is a significant source of revenue; for example, stamps from Tokelau, South Georgia & South Sandwich Islands, Tristan da Cunha, Niuafoʻou and many others. Stamp collecting is commonly known as philately, although strictly the latter term refers to the study of stamps.

Another form of collecting regards postcards, a document written on a single robust sheet of paper, usually decorated with photographic pictures or artistic drawings on one of the sides, and short messages on a small part of the other side, that also contained the space for the address. In strict philatelic usage, the postcard is to be distinguished from the postal card, which has a pre-printed postage on the card. The fact that this communication is visible by other than the receiver often causes the messages to be written in jargon.

Letters are often studied as an example of literature, and also in biography in the case of a famous person. A portion of the New Testament of the Bible is composed of the Apostle Paul's epistles to Christian congregations in various parts of the Roman Empire. See below for a list of famous letters.

A style of writing, called epistolary, tells a fictional story in the form of the correspondence between two or more characters.

A makeshift mail method after stranding on a deserted island is a message in a bottle.

=== Deregulation ===
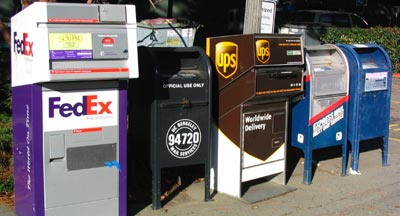
Private American companies, such as FedEx and UPS, are direct competitors of the public United States Postal Service, particularly for package delivery. Different mailboxes are also provided for local and express service. The United States Postal Service, as the mail carrier of the federal government, has a legal monopoly on first-class and standard mail delivery.

Numerous countries, including Sweden (1 January 1993), New Zealand (1998 and 2003), Germany (2005 and 2007), Argentina and Chile opened up the postal services market to new entrants. In the case of New Zealand Post Limited, this included (from 2003) its right to be the sole New Zealand postal administration member of the Universal Postal Union, thus the ending of its monopoly on stamps bearing the name New Zealand. Estonia started the process of selling and fully privatizing the national postal service in September 2026.

== Types ==
=== Letters ===
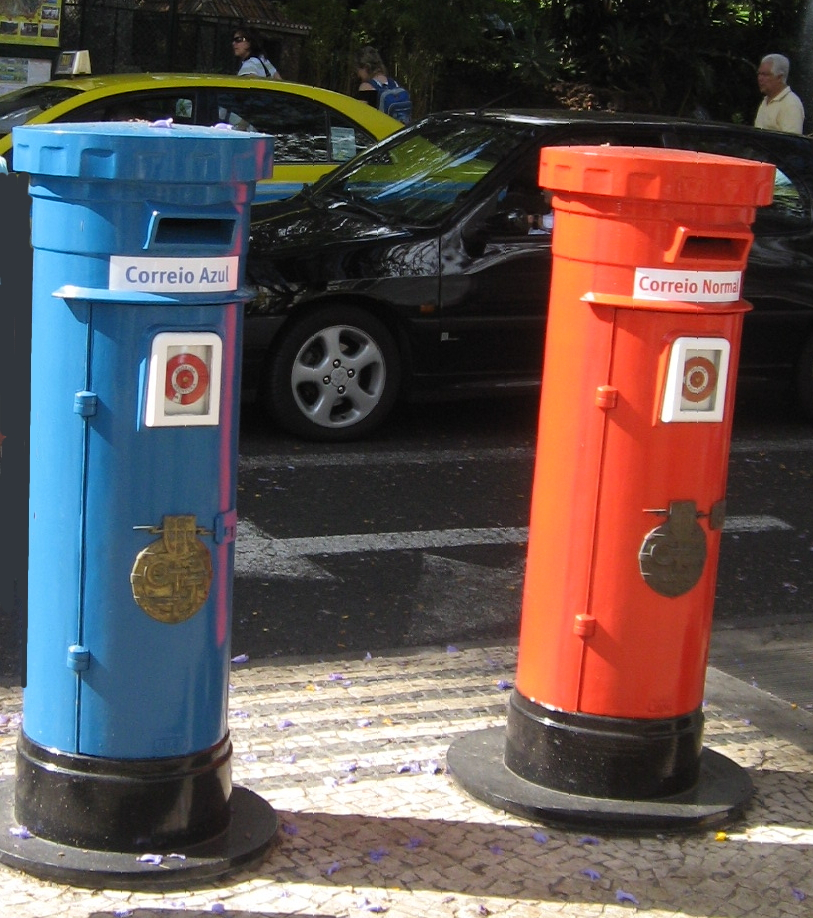
Pillar boxes on the Portuguese island of Madeira (first-class mail in blue and second-class mail in red), 2008

Letter-sized mail constitutes the bulk of the contents sent through most postal services. These are usually documents printed on A4 (210×297 mm), Letter-sized (8.5×11 inches), or smaller paper and placed in envelopes.

Handwritten correspondence, while once a major means of communications between distant people, is now used less frequently due to the advent of more immediate forms of communication, such as the telephone or email. Traditional letters, however, are often considered to hark back to a "simpler time" and are still used when someone wishes to be deliberate and thoughtful about their communication. An example would be a letter of sympathy to a bereaved person.

Bills and invoices are often sent through the mail, like regular billing correspondence from utility companies and other service providers. These letters often contain a self-addressed envelope that allows the receiver to remit payment back to the company easily. While still very common, many people now opt to use online bill payment services, which eliminate the need to receive bills through the mail. Paperwork for the confirmation of large financial transactions is often sent through the mail. Many tax documents are as well.

New credit cards and their corresponding personal identification numbers are sent to their owners through the mail. The card and number are usually mailed separately several days or weeks apart for security reasons.

Bulk mail is mail that is prepared for bulk mailing, often by presorting, and processing at reduced rates. It is often used in direct marketing and other advertising mail, although it has other uses as well. The senders of these messages sometimes purchase lists of addresses (which are sometimes targeted towards certain demographics) and then send letters advertising their product or service to all recipients. Other times, commercial solicitations are sent by local companies advertising local products, like a restaurant delivery service advertising to their delivery area or a retail store sending their weekly advertising circular to a general area. Bulk mail is also often sent to companies' existing subscriber bases, advertising new products or services.

==== First-Class ====
First-Class Mail in the U.S. includes postcards, letters, and large envelopes (flats). Letters must weigh under 3.5 ounces and large envelopes must weigh under 13 ounces. USPS formerly offered First-Class delivery for small parcels under 1 pound up until July 2023, when First-Class Package Service was replaced by USPS Ground Advantage. Delivery is given priority over second-class (newspapers and magazines), third class (bulk advertisements), and fourth-class mail (books and media packages). First-Class Mail prices are based on both the shape and weight of the item being mailed. Pieces over 13 ounces can be sent as Priority Mail. As of 2011 42% of First-Class Mail arrived the next day, 27% in two days, and 31% in three. The USPS expected that changes to the service in 2012 would cause about 51% to arrive in two days and most of the rest in three. The Canada Post counterpart is Lettermail.

The British Royal Mail's 1st Class, as it is styled, is simply a priority option over 2nd Class, at a slightly higher cost. Royal Mail aims (but does not guarantee) to deliver all 1st Class letters the day after posting.

In Austria priority delivery mail is called Prio, in Switzerland A-Post.

==== Registered and recorded mail ====
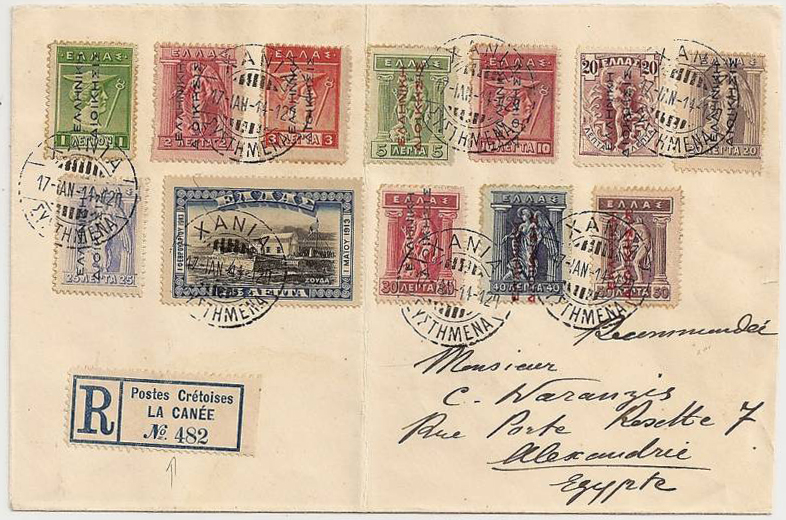
Multi-franked registered mail from the Cretan State (using Greek stamps as a result of the union with the Kingdom of Greece) to the Kingdom of Egypt, showing a numbered registration label, 1914

Registered mail allows the location and in particular the correct delivery of a letter to be tracked. It is usually considerably more expensive than regular mail, and is typically used for valuable items. Registered mail is constantly tracked through the system.

Recorded mail is handled just like ordinary mail with the exception that it has to be signed for on receipt. This is useful for legal documents where proof of delivery is required.

In the United Kingdom recorded delivery mail (branded as signed for by the Royal Mail) is covered by The Recorded Delivery Services Act 1962. Under this legislation any document which its relevant law requires service by registered post can also be lawfully served by recorded delivery.

==== Repositionable notes ====
The United States Postal Service introduced a test allowing "repositionable notes" (for example, 3M's Post-it notes) to be attached to the outside of envelopes and bulk mailings, afterwards extending the test for an unspecified period. The repositionable note may be fixed directly to the address side of First-Class Mail and Standard Mail letter-size mailpieces. These mailpieces must meet the standards in 7.2 through 7.6. The note is included as an integral part of the mailpiece for weight and postage rate and must be accounted for in pricing.

=== Postal cards and postcards ===
Postal cards and postcards are small message cards that are sent by mail unenveloped; the distinction often, though not invariably and reliably, drawn between them is that "postal cards" are issued by the postal authority or entity with the "postal indicia" (or "stamp") preprinted on them, while postcards are privately issued and require affixing an adhesive stamp (though there have been some cases of a postal authority's issuing non-stamped postcards). Postcards are often printed to promote tourism, with pictures of resorts, tourist attractions or humorous messages on the front and allowing for a short message from the sender to be written on the back. The postage required for postcards is generally less than postage required for standard letters; however, certain technicalities such as their being oversized or having cut-outs, may result in payment of the first-class rate being required.

Postcards are also used by magazines for new subscriptions. Inside many magazines are postage-paid subscription cards that a reader can fill out and mail back to the publishing company to be billed for a subscription to the magazine. In this fashion, magazines also use postcards for other purposes, including reader surveys, contests or information requests.

Postcards are sometimes sent by charities to their members with a message to be signed and sent to a politician (e.g. to promote fair trade or third world debt cancellation).

=== Mail bags ===
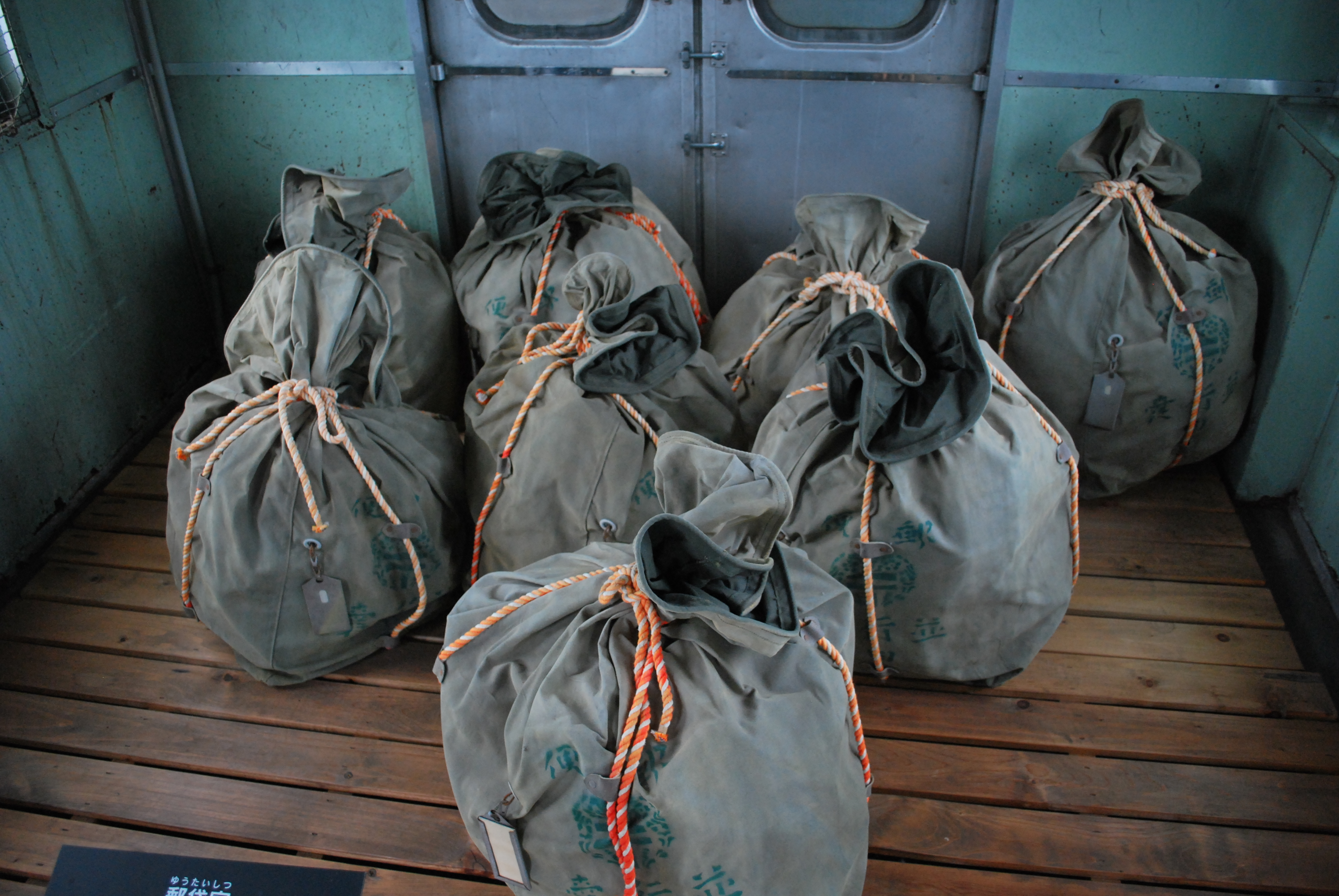
Japanese mail sacks

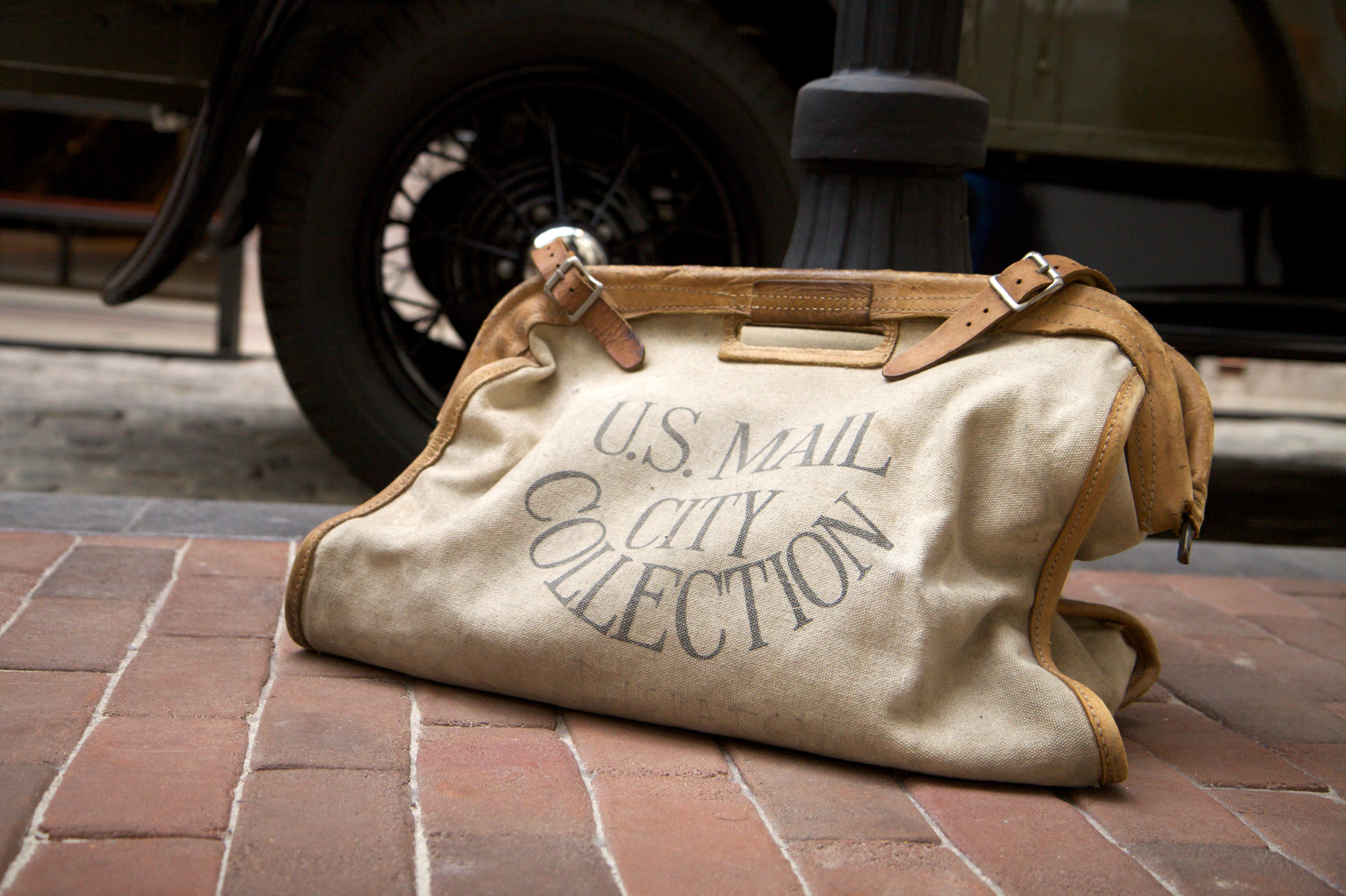
Vintage US mail bag

A mail bag or mailbag can be one of several types of bags used for collecting or carrying different types of postal material.

=== Other mail services ===
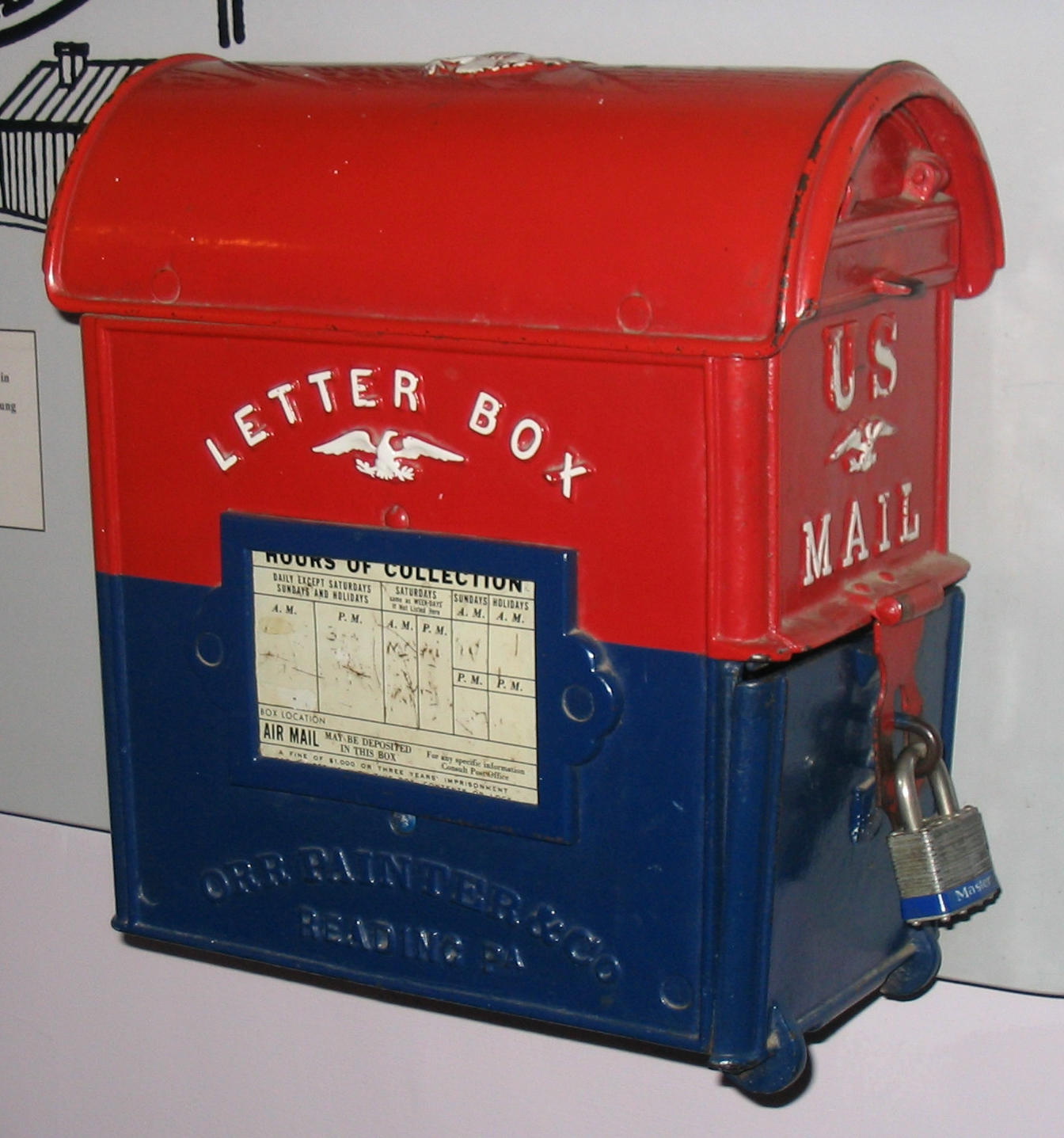
An antique U.S. letterbox on display and in use at the Smithsonian Institution Building, 2005

Small packets are usually less than 2 kg (4 lb).

Larger envelopes are also sent through the mail. These are often composed of a stronger material than standard envelopes and are often used by businesses to transport documents that may not be folded or damaged, such as legal documents and contracts. Due to their size, larger envelopes are sometimes charged additional postage.

Packages are often sent through some postal services, usually requiring additional postage than an average letter or postcard. Many postal services have limitations as to what a package may or may not contain, usually placing limits or bans on perishable, hazardous or flammable materials. Some hazardous materials in limited quantities may be shipped with appropriate markings and packaging, like an ORM-D label. Additionally, as a result of terrorism concerns, the U.S. Postal Service subjects their packages to numerous security tests, often scanning or x-raying packages for materials that might be found in biological materials or mail bombs.

Newspapers and magazines are also sent through postal services. Many magazines are simply deposited in the mail like any other mailpiece. In the U.S., they are printed with a special Intelligent Mail barcode that acts as prepaid postage. Other magazines are now shipped in shrinkwrap to protect loose contents such as blow-in cards. During the second half of the 19th century and the first half of the 20th century, newspapers and magazines were normally posted using wrappers with a stamp imprint.

Hybrid mail, sometimes referred to as L-mail, is the electronic lodgement of mail from the mail generator's computer directly to a Postal Service provider. The Postal Service provider is then able to use electronic means to have the mail piece sorted, routed and physically produced at a site closest to the delivery point. It is a type of mail growing in popularity with some Post Office operations and individual businesses venturing into this market. In some countries, these services are available to print and deliver emails to those who are unable to receive email, such as the elderly or infirm. Services provided by Hybrid mail providers are closely related to that of mail forwarding service providers.

== Business model ==
The business model of modern postal operators can be broken down to four stages: (1) collection, (2) sorting, (3) transportation, and (4) delivery.

Collection is the gathering of mailpieces from various locations such as customer premises, post boxes, and post offices. Newly collected mail is normally not sorted immediately upon receipt and is instead taken directly in its unsorted state to sorting centers.

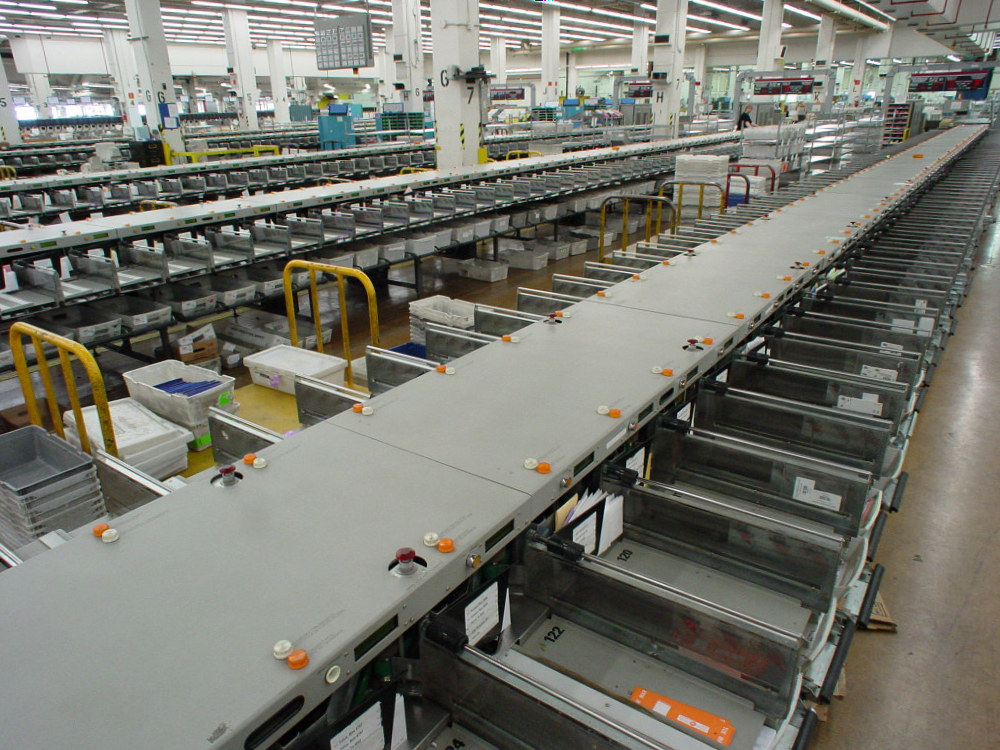
Mail sorting line

Mail sorting is the process of segregating mailpieces into groups based on their type and destination, so that they can be loaded onto an appropriate mode of transportation headed in the general direction of their final destinations. Traditionally, mail was manually sorted by hand, but it is increasingly sorted by automatic sorting machines. The main dilemma faced by postal operators when organizing the sorting stage is whether to have a smaller number of large, centralized sorting centers (a spoke–hub distribution paradigm) or a larger number of smaller sorting centers along with a larger number of direct connections between all of them (point-to-point transit).

Transportation is the process of carrying mail from one place to another. A mailpiece usually has to be transported from one sorting center to another sorting center, where it is often sorted to another transportation segment headed towards its destination address, until it reaches the sorting center that directly serves that address.

Delivery is the process of carrying mail to final destinations such as letter boxes. Sorting centers sort mailpieces destined for addresses in their immediate vicinity to carriers serving those addresses. Transporting mail to final destinations (the so-called last mile problem) is the most labor-intensive stage and accounts for up to 50% of postal operators' expenses. Depending upon the final destination, carriers often use vehicles, their own feet, or a combination of both. Postal operators try to control costs by presorting mail for carriers, so that they receive mail already arranged in the correct sequence for their designated routes; reducing the frequency of deliveries; or retiming deliveries so that they are spread throughout the day.

== See also ==
- See Category Postal organizations, examples being:
  - Deutsche Post DHL Group, Germany
  - La Poste (France)
  - Poste Italiane, Italy
  - Royal Mail, British
    - Post Office Limited, British
  - United States Postal Service
- Express mail
- EPPML
- Parcel (package)
- Shipping insurance
- Universal Postal Union
- List of postal entities

Components of a postal system:

- Fire sign (address)
- Letter box
- Mail carrier
- Mail train
- Packstation
- Post box
- Post office
- Post-office box
- Postage rate
- Postal code
