= Bulk mail =

Mail processed at volume at reduced rates

Bulk mail broadly refers to mail that is mailed and processed in bulk at reduced rates. The term is sometimes used as a synonym for advertising mail.

The United States Postal Service (USPS) defines bulk mail broadly as "quantities of mail prepared for mailing at reduced postage rates." The preparation includes presorting and placing into containers by ZIP code. The containers, along with a manifest, are taken to an area in a post office called a bulk-mail-entry unit. The presorting and the use of containers allow highly automated mail processing, both in bulk and piecewise, in processing facilities called bulk mail centers (BMCs).

In 2009, the USPS announced plans to streamline sorting and delivery. BMCs were renamed Network Distribution Centers.

== Junk mail ==
Although bulk mail, junk mail, and admail are, strictly speaking, not synonymous, the terms are used in common parlance to refer to unsolicited invitations delivered by mail (typically, but not invariably, at bulk rates) to homes and businesses.
