= National Association of Presort Mailers =

US trade group

The National Association of Presort Mailers (NAPM) is a US trade group which represents major mailers and third-party presorted mailing firms.
