= ORM-D =

Marking for mail or shipping goods in the US

Labels for ORM-D. The bottom label, ORM-D-AIR, was for packages that could also be safely sent via aircraft.

ORM-D (other regulated materials for domestic transport only) was a marking for mail or shipping in the United States. Packages bearing this mark contained hazardous material in a limited quantity that present a limited hazard during transportation, due to its form, quantity, and packaging. ORM-D was phased out by the US Department of Transportation on January 1, 2021.

Consumer commodity is a hazardous material that is packaged and distributed in a quantity and form intended or suitable for retail sale and designed for consumption by individuals for their personal care or household use purposes. This term can also include certain drugs or medicines. Examples of items classed ORM-D include:

- Aerosol cans
- Charcoal
- Nail polish remover
- Lighters
- Nitromethane fuel
- Perfumes
- Small arms ammunition (Shipped under a variant label, that listed 'Cartridges, small arms')
- Soldering flux
- Some photographic chemicals

The Code of Federal Regulations (CFR) Title 49 Part 171.8 defines a Consumer Commodity and those items with exceptions provided in the 172.101 table, of limited quantity, and conforming to the definition of "Consumer Commodity" may be marked and sent ORM-D. There are weight and volume restrictions for all ORM-D packages which vary by hazard class. For example, a gallon of a Class 3 flammable liquid PGII cannot be reclassified as ORM-D because it exceeds the limited quantity volume. However, a gallon of a Class 6, PGIII material is within the volume criteria for a Limited Quantity. That gallon can then be labeled as an ORM-D if it meets the definition of a substance that can be converted from a Limited Quantity to an ORM-D.

It is impossible to have an ORM-D that does not fit the criteria for a Limited Quantity. First an item is determined to be a Limited Quantity, and then it is determined if it can be reclassified further to become an ORM-D. If the item is able to be reclassified as ORM-D the proper shipping name is usually, but not always, "Consumer Commodity" as found in the 172.101 table. Other proper shipping names used for ORM-D material are Cartridges Small Arms and Cartridges Power Device. These products will no longer fall under one of the nine hazard classes either, its "Hazard Class or Division" is now defined as "ORM-D".

Material marked "ORM-D" and shipped by surface transportation does not require hazardous shipping papers, simply an ORM-D and proper shipping name marking on the box. This marking can either be in the form of an ORM-D sticker, or written by hand. If written by hand the letters "ORM-D" must be enclosed by a rectangle. When transported by air, ORM-D shipments require an ORM-D-AIR marking and full hazardous shipping papers.

Both UPS Ground and FedEx Ground do not require a hazardous shipping contract to ship ORM-D packages except to Alaska and Hawaii. FedEx Ground does not transport ORM-D packages to Alaska or Hawaii. The United States Postal Service will accept ORM-D packages only for materials intended for domestic surface transportation. Its use is prohibited in international mail. As of 1 January 2014, FedEx Ground will no longer accept shipments labeled as ORM-D, Consumer Commodity, however these same materials can still be shipped using a different label. Per DOT regulations, FedEx Ground Limited Quantity packages can be shipped with a Hazardous Shipping Paper (OP-900) and Hazardous Material Certification OP-950), or without shipping papers by affixing the specific Limited Quantity Diamond Label to the package.

== Phase-out ==
Limited Quantity marks. The left mark is for surface (land and sea) transport. The right mark, featuring the letter "Y" in the center, is for air transport.

In January 2011, Pipeline and Hazardous Materials Safety Administration (PMSA), as part of DOT rulemaking HM-215K announced that the ORM-D sticker would be discontinued to make United States regulations similar to international dangerous goods regulations. The international "limited quantity" marking, a black and white square on point, was designated as the replacement marking for the ORM-D and ORM-D-AIR markings.

As of 1 January 2021, the ORM-D marking is prohibited from stand alone use in shipping, as the ORM-D classification that the label referred to is no longer part of Hazardous Material Regulations (HMR). In a 2022 interpretation letter to a shipper, the Pipeline and Hazardous Materials Safety Administration has stated that it does not recommend using the old ORM-D and new limited quantity markings together. While not explicitly prohibited by HMR, the old marking may cause confusion and delay transit of cargo.

=== Air transport ===
The phase out date for ORM-D-AIR marking was December 31, 2012. The ORM-D-AIR marking was never recognized by the International Air Transport Association (IATA). As result, a number of airlines required packages to comply with the international guidelines used by the IATA, instead of the US regulations, rendering the marking largely useless. In air transport, a limited quantity marking that included a letter "Y" in the center of the square was the prescribed replacement for ORM-D-AIR.

=== Ground transport ===
For ground (road and rail) transport, the original phase out date was intended for December 31, 2013. Following concerns from shippers about the initial 2013 date, PMSA considered a multi-stage gradual phase out that would have ended in 2015; before announcing a hard end date for ORM-D in ground transport on December 31, 2020.
