= Snail Mail =

Snail mail refers to correspondence or packages sent via conventional postal delivery. It may also refer to:

- Snail Mail (video game), 2004 video game
- Snail Mail (musician) (born 1999), American musician

== See also ==
- Snail Mail No More, title of a book
- "Snail Mail", the title of a 2016 episode of SpongeBob SquarePants's ninth season
