= Network distribution center =

Classification of United States Postal Service mail processing facilities

A network distribution center (NDC) was a highly mechanized mail processing plant of the United States Postal Service that distributed standard mail and package services in piece and bulk form. The NDC network was dismantled in 2022–2023 by the USPS as part of Postmaster General Louis DeJoy's Delivering for America network rationalization plan, which saw mail classes formerly handled by the NDC network merged into mailstreams in processing and distribution centers. Each former NDC, all of which were located in buildings owned by USPS, are implementing or in the process of creating individual plans for repurposing the buildings. Many are being restacked into RPDCs, which will form the backbone of the new USPS network, whereas others are being used to insource previously outsourced transportation functions such as surface transfer centers (STCs), or terminal handing services (THS), which handled airmail, in addition to continuing to support processing and distribution centers with the handing of priority and ground advantage parcels .

== List of network distribution centers ==
The United States Postal Service has 20 NDCs:

Destination ZIP	NDC name	Location
005, 066, 068–079, 085–119	New Jersey NDC	Jersey City, NJ
006–009, 313–317, 320–342, 344, 346–347, 349, 398	Jacksonville NDC	Jacksonville, FL
010–065, 067, 120–129	Springfield NDC	Springfield, MA
080–084, 169–199, 254	Philadelphia NDC	Philadelphia, PA
130–168, 260, 265, 439–449	Pittsburgh NDC	Warrendale, PA
200–212, 214–223, 226–228, 267–268	Washington NDC	Capitol Heights, MD
240–241, 243, 245, 270–278, 283–296, 299	Greensboro NDC	Greensboro, NC
246–253, 255–259, 261–264, 266, 400–406, 410–416, 427, 430–433, 437–438, 450–462, 469–474, 478–479	Cincinnati NDC	Cincinnati, OH
369–372, 375, 380–393, 396–397, 421–422, 700–701; 703–708, 716–717, 719–729	Memphis NDC	Memphis, TN
420, 423–424, 475–477, 609, 613–620, 622–631, 633–634, 636–639	St. Louis NDC	Hazelwood, MO
434–436, 465–468, 480–497	Detroit NDC	Allen Park, MI
463–464, 530–532, 534–535, 537–539, 549, 600–608, 610–611	Chicago NDC	Forest Park, IL
498–499, 540–548, 550–551, 553–567, 576, 580–588	Minneapolis–Saint Paul NDC	Eagan, MN
500–516, 520–528, 570–575, 577, 612, 680–681, 683–689	Des Moines NDC	Des Moines, IA
590–599, 677, 690–693, 800–816, 820–831, 840–846, 850–853, 855–857, 859–860, 863, 865, 870–871, 873–879, 884, 898	Denver NDC	Denver, CO
635, 640–641, 644–658, 660–662, 664–676, 678	Kansas City NDC	Kansas City, KS
679, 710–714, 718, 730–731, 733–741, 743–770, 772–799, 880–883, 885	Dallas NDC	Dallas, TX
835, 838, 980–985, 988–999	Seattle NDC	Federal Way, WA
847, 864, 889–891, 893, 900–908, 910–928, 930–935	Los Angeles NDC	Bell Gardens, CA
894–895, 897, 936–969	San Francisco NDC	Richmond, CA

For mail originating in ZIP Code Areas 006–009 and addressed to addresses in those ZIP Code Areas, the sectional center facility in San Juan, Puerto Rico serves as the NDC.

== List of international service centers ==
The United States Postal Service also has 4 international service centers (ISC) for distributing international mail:

Origin ZIP	ISC name	Airport	Location
005, 010–089, 100–212, 214–268, 270–297, 400–418, 420–427, 470–477	ISC New York NY	John F. Kennedy International Airport	New York City, NY
006–009, 298–342, 344, 346–347, 349–352, 354–399	ISC Miami FL	Miami International Airport	Miami, FL
090–098, 424, 430–469, 478–516, 520–528, 530–532, 534–535, 537–551, 553–567, 570–577, 580–588, 600–620, 622–631, 633–641, 644–658, 660–662, 664–681, 683–693, 700–701, 703–708, 710–714, 716–731, 733–741, 743–799, 885, 962–966	ISC Chicago IL	O'Hare International Airport	Chicago, IL
590–599, 800–816, 820–838, 840–847, 850–853, 855–857, 859–860, 863–865, 870–884, 889–891, 893–895, 897–898, 900–908, 910–928, 930–961, 967–969 970–986, 988–999	ISC Los Angeles CA	Los Angeles International Airport	Los Angeles, CA

In addition to the four ISCs, the postal service has four International Exchange Offices (IEOs), which are authorized to accept and process limited inbound and outbound international mail volumes. IEOs handle less than 5% of international volume, and do not have the full capabilities and functions of ISCs. Currently, the postal service has four active IEOs: The New Jersey Network Distribution Center in Jersey City, NJ, the Honolulu Processing and Distribution Center in Honolulu, HI, the Pago Pago Main Post Office in Pago Pago, American Samoa, and the Barrigada Post Office in Barrigada, Guam.

== See also ==
- List of United States post offices
- Sectional center facility (SCF)
- United States Postal Service
