= Sectional center facility =

Processing and distribution center of the US Postal Service

A sectional center facility (SCF) is a processing and distribution center (P&DC) of the United States Postal Service (USPS) that serves a designated geographical area defined by one or more three-digit ZIP Code prefixes. A sectional center facility routes mail between local post offices, sorting and delivery centers (SDCs), to and from network distribution centers (NDCs), and to and from other sectional center facilities.

== Civil SCFs ==
=== Alabama ===
Note: Alabama 369 is served by Jackson, Mississippi; 353 is unassigned.

- Birmingham (350–352, 354–359, 362), 351 24th St N, Birmingham, AL 35203
- Montgomery (360–361, 363–364, 367–368) 6701 Winton Blount Blvd, Montgomery AL 36119
- Mobile (365–366, Mississippi 394) 4538 Shipyard Rd, Mobile AL 36675

=== Alaska ===
- Anchorage (995–997): 4141 Postmark Dr., Anchorage, AK 99519,
- Juneau (998)
- Ketchikan (999)

=== American Samoa ===
American Samoa is served by the SCF in Honolulu, Hawaii.

=== Arizona ===
Note: AZ 864 served by Las Vegas, Nevada; AZ 865 served by Albuquerque, New Mexico; 854, 858, 861, and 862 are unassigned.

- Phoenix (850–853, 855, 859, 860, 863)
- Tucson (856–857)

=== Arkansas ===
Note: Arkansas 723–724 served by Memphis, Tennessee; Arkansas 718 served by Shreveport, Louisiana.

- Little Rock (716–717, 719–722, 725, 728)
- Northwest Arkansas (726–727, 729)

=== California ===
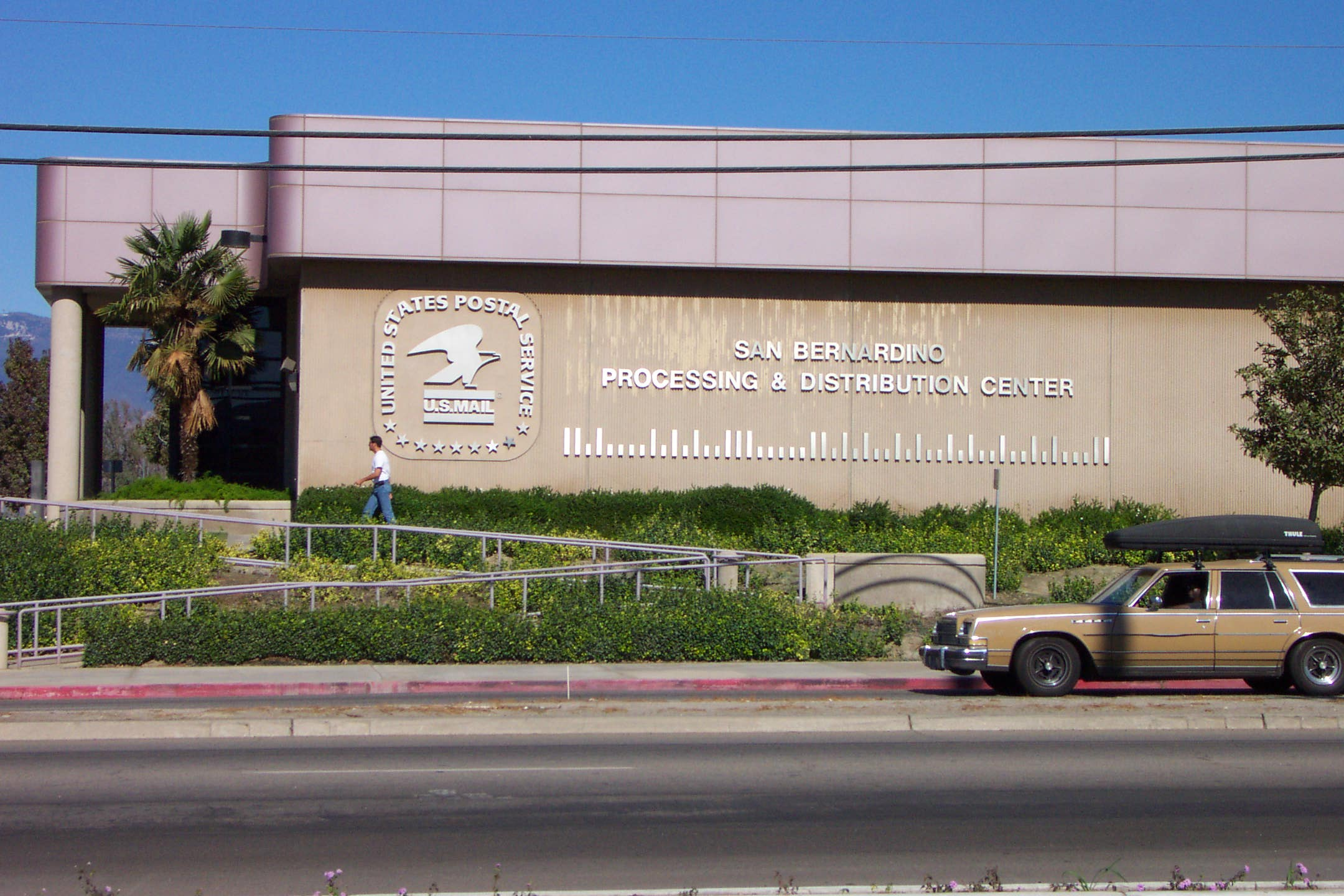
San Bernardino SCF, with accurate POSTNET barcode on its exterior

Note: CA 961 is served by Reno, Nevada; CA 909 and 929 are unassigned.

- Los Angeles (900–905, 907, 908) 7001 S. Central Ave., Los Angeles, CA 90052-9998
- Industry (906, 917, 918) 15421 E Gale Ave., City of Industry, CA 91715-9608
- Santa Clarita (910–916) 28201 Franklin Pkwy., Santa Clarita, CA 91383-9998
- San Diego (919–921) 11251 Rancho Carmel Drive, San Diego, CA 92199-9998
- San Bernardino (922–924) 1900 W Redlands Blvd., San Bernardino, CA 92403-9997
- Moreno Valley (925)
- Santa Ana (926–927) 3101 W. Sunflower Ave., Santa Ana, CA 92799-0101
- Anaheim (928) 5335 E. La Palma Ave., Anaheim, CA 92899-9002
- Santa Barbara (930–931, 934) 400 Storke Road, Goleta, CA 93117
- Bakersfield (932–933, 935)
- Fresno (936–937, IRS 938)
- San Jose (939, 950–951) 1750 Lundy Avenue, San Jose, CA 95101-9998
- San Francisco (940–941, 943–944) 1300 Evans Ave, San Francisco, CA 94188-8014
- Sacramento (942, 952–953, 956–959) 3775 Industrial Blvd., West Sacramento, CA 95799-9998
- Oakland (945–948) 1675 7th St, Oakland, CA 94615
- North Bay (949, 954)
- Eureka (955)
- Redding (960)

=== Colorado ===
Note: Colorado 813 is served by Albuquerque, New Mexico; 817–819 are unassigned.

- Denver (800–807) 25630 East 75th Ave., Denver CO 80249
- Colorado Springs (808–812)
- Grand Junction (814–816)

=== Connecticut ===
Note: 066, 068, and 069 are served by Westchester, New York.

- Hartford (060–065, 067, Massachusetts 010–012) 141 Weston St., Hartford, CT 06101

=== Delaware ===
- Wilmington (197–199, Pennsylvania 193) 147 Quigley Blvd., New Castle, DE 19720

=== Washington, D.C. ===
- Washington (200) (Street and PO box addresses), 900 Brentwood Rd. NE, Washington DC 20066-9998
- Washington Government Mails Annex (202–205) (for mail destined to government buildings), 3300 V St NE, Washington DC 20018-1528

=== Florida ===
Note: Florida 343, 345, and 348 are unassigned. For 340, see Military below.

- Jacksonville (320, 322, 326, 344, Georgia 313–315) 7415 Commonwealth Ave, Jacksonville, FL 32099
- Orlando (321, 327–329, 347) 10401 Post Office Blvd., Orlando, FL 32862
- Tallahassee (323, Georgia 316–317 & 398) 2800 S Adams St, Tallahassee, FL 32301
- Pensacola (324–325) 1400 W Jordan St, Pensacola, FL 32501
- Miami (330–333) 2200 NW 72nd Ave, Miami FL 33152
- West Palm Beach (334, 349) 3200 Summit Blvd, West Palm Beach, FL 33416
- Tampa (335, 336, 346) 1801 Grant St., Tampa, FL 33605
- Manasota (337, 338, 342) 850 Tallevast Rd. Sarasota, FL. 34260
- Fort Myers (339, 341) 14080 Jetport Loop, Fort Myers, FL 33913

=== Georgia ===
Note: Georgia 307 is served by Chattanooga, Tennessee. Georgia 313–315 are served by Jacksonville, FL. Georgia 316–317, and 398 are served by Tallahassee, FL

- North Metro, GA (300, 305–306) 1605 Boggs Rd, Duluth, GA 30096-1876
- Atlanta (301–303, 311, IRS 399) 3900 Crown Rd. SW, Atlanta, GA 30304
- Macon (304, 310, 312, 318–319) 451 College St., Macon, GA 31213
- Augusta (308–309; South Carolina 298) 525 8th St., Augusta, GA 30901

=== Guam ===
- Barrigada (969) 489 Army Dr., Barrigada, GU 96913

=== Hawaii ===
Honolulu (967–968) 3600 Aolele St, Honolulu, HI 96820

=== Idaho ===
Note: Idaho 835 and 838 are served by Spokane, Washington; 839 is unassigned.

- Pocatello (832, 834)
- Boise (833, 836–837, Oregon 979)

=== Illinois ===
Note: Illinois 620, 622, and 628–629 are served by St. Louis, Missouri; 621 is unassigned.

- Palatine (600, 602, 610–611) 1300 Northwest Hwy., Palatine, IL 60095
- Carol Stream (601, 603) 550 E Fullerton Ave, Carol Stream, IL 60188
- South Suburban (604) 6801 W 73rd St, Bedford Park, IL 60499
- Fox Valley (605) 3900 Gabrielle Ln, Aurora, IL 60599
- Chicago (606–608) 433 W Harrison St, Chicago, IL 60699
- Champaign (609, 617–619, 624) 2001 N Mattis Ave, Champaign, IL 61821
- Quad Cities (612; Iowa 526–528) 7700 68th St, Milan, IL 61264
- Peoria (613–616) 95 State St, Peoria, IL 61601
- Springfield (623, 625–627) 2105 E Cook St, Springfield, IL 62703

=== Indiana ===
Indiana 470 is served by Cincinnati, Ohio; Indiana 471 is served by Louisville, Kentucky.

- Indianapolis (460–462, 469, 472, 474, 478–479)
- Gary (463–464)
- South Bend (465–466)
- Fort Wayne (467–468)
- Muncie (473)
- Evansville (475–477, Kentucky 420, 423–424); 800 Sycamore St., Evansville, IN 47708-9998

=== Iowa ===
Note: Iowa 510–513 are served by Sioux Falls, South Dakota; Iowa 515–516 are served by Omaha, Nebraska; Iowa 526–528 are served by Quad Cities, Illinois; 517–519 and 529 are unassigned.

- Des Moines (500–503, 505, 508–509, 514, 525)
- Waterloo (504, 506–507, 521)
- Cedar Rapids (520, 522–524)

=== Kansas ===
Note: 660–662 and 664–668 are served by Kansas City, Missouri; 677 is served by North Platte, Nebraska; 679 is served by Amarillo, Texas; 663 is unassigned.

- Wichita (669–676, 678)

=== Kentucky ===
Note: Kentucky 407–409, 417, 418, 425, and 426 are served by Knoxville, Tennessee; Kentucky 410 is served by Cincinnati, Ohio; Kentucky 411, 412, 415, and 416 are served by Charleston, West Virginia; Kentucky 421 and 422 are served by Nashville, Tennessee; Kentucky 420, 423 and 424 are served by Evansville, Indiana; 419, 428, and 429 are unassigned.

- Louisville (400–402, 427, Indiana 471) 1420 Gardiner Ln, Louisville KY 40213
- Lexington (403–406, 413–414) 1088 Nandino Blvd, Lexington KY 40511

=== Louisiana ===
Note: Louisiana 702, 709 and 715 are unassigned.

- New Orleans (700–701, 703–704)
- Lafayette (705–706)
- Baton Rouge (707–708), 8101 Bluebonnet Blvd, Baton Rouge, LA 70810
- Shreveport (710–714, Arkansas 718, Texas 755, 756, and 759)

=== Maine ===
- Southern Maine (039–043, 045, 048) 125 Forest Ave., Portland, ME 04101
- Eastern Maine (044, 046, 047, 049) 16 Penobscot Meadow Dr., Hampden, ME 04444

=== Marshall Islands ===
See Guam above.

=== Maryland ===
Note: 213 is unassigned.

- Southern Maryland (206–207), 9201 Edgeworth Dr., Capitol Heights MD 20790-9998
- Suburban Maryland (208–209), 16501 Shady Grove Rd., Gaithersburg MD 20898-9998
- Linthicum (210–211, 214), 961 Corporate Blvd., Linthicum Heights, MD 21090-2225
- Baltimore (212, 215, 217, 219, West Virginia 267), 900 E. Fayette St., Baltimore, MD 21233-9715
- Eastern Shore (216, 218), 29060 Airpark Dr., Easton, MD 21601-9997

=== Massachusetts ===
Note: Massachusetts 010–012 are served by Hartford, Connecticut; Massachusetts 025–027 are served by Providence, Rhode Island.

- Central Massachusetts (013–017) 192 Main St., Shrewsbury, MA 01546
- Middlesex-Essex (018–019, IRS 055) 76 Main St., North Reading, MA 01889
- Brockton (020, 023) 225 Liberty St., Brockton, MA 02301
- Boston (021–022, 024) 25 Dorchester Ave., Boston, MA 02205

=== Michigan ===
- Metroplex (480, 483–487) 711 North Glenwood Avenue, Pontiac, MI 48340
- Detroit (481–482, 492): 1401 West Fort Street #1006, Detroit, MI 48233-1001
- Lansing (488–489)
- Grand Rapids (490–491, 493–495)
- Traverse City (496–497)
- Iron Mountain (498–499)

=== Minnesota ===
Note: 552 is unassigned. 565 is served by Fargo, ND. 567 is served by Grand Forks, ND

- St. Paul (550–551, 559, Wisconsin 540 and 546)
- Minneapolis (553–555, 566)
- Duluth (556–558)
- Mankato (560–561)
- St. Cloud (562–564)

=== Mississippi ===
Note: Mississippi 386 and 388 are served by Memphis, Tennessee. Mississippi 394 is served by Mobile, Alabama.

- Jackson (387, 389–393, 396, 397, Alabama 369) 401 E South St, Jackson MS 39201
- Gulfport (395) 10285 Corporate Dr, Gulfport MS 39503

=== Missouri ===
Note: Missouri 632, 642–643, and 659 are unassigned.

- St. Louis (630–631, 633–634, 636–639; Illinois 620, 622, 628–629) 1720 Market St., St. Louis, MO 63155
- Mid-Missouri (635, 650–653)
- Kansas City (640–641, 644–647, IRS 649; Kansas 660–662 & 664–668) 1700 Cleveland Ave. Kansas City, MO 64121
- Springfield (648, 654–658)

=== Montana ===
- Billings (590–593, 597, Wyoming 821)
- Great Falls (594–596)
- Missoula (598–599)

=== Nebraska ===
Note: 682 and 694–699 are unassigned.

- Omaha (680–681, 686–687, Iowa 515–516)
- Lincoln (683–685, 688–689)
- North Platte (690–693; Kansas 677)

=== Nevada ===
Note: Nevada 892, 896, and 899 are unassigned. Nevada 898 is served by Salt Lake City, UT

- Las Vegas (889–891, 893, Arizona 864, Utah 847)
- Reno (894–895, 897, California 961)

=== New Hampshire ===
Note: New Hampshire 035–037 are served by White River Junction, Vermont.

- Manchester (030–034, 038) 955 Goffs Falls Rd., Manchester, NH 03103

=== New Jersey ===
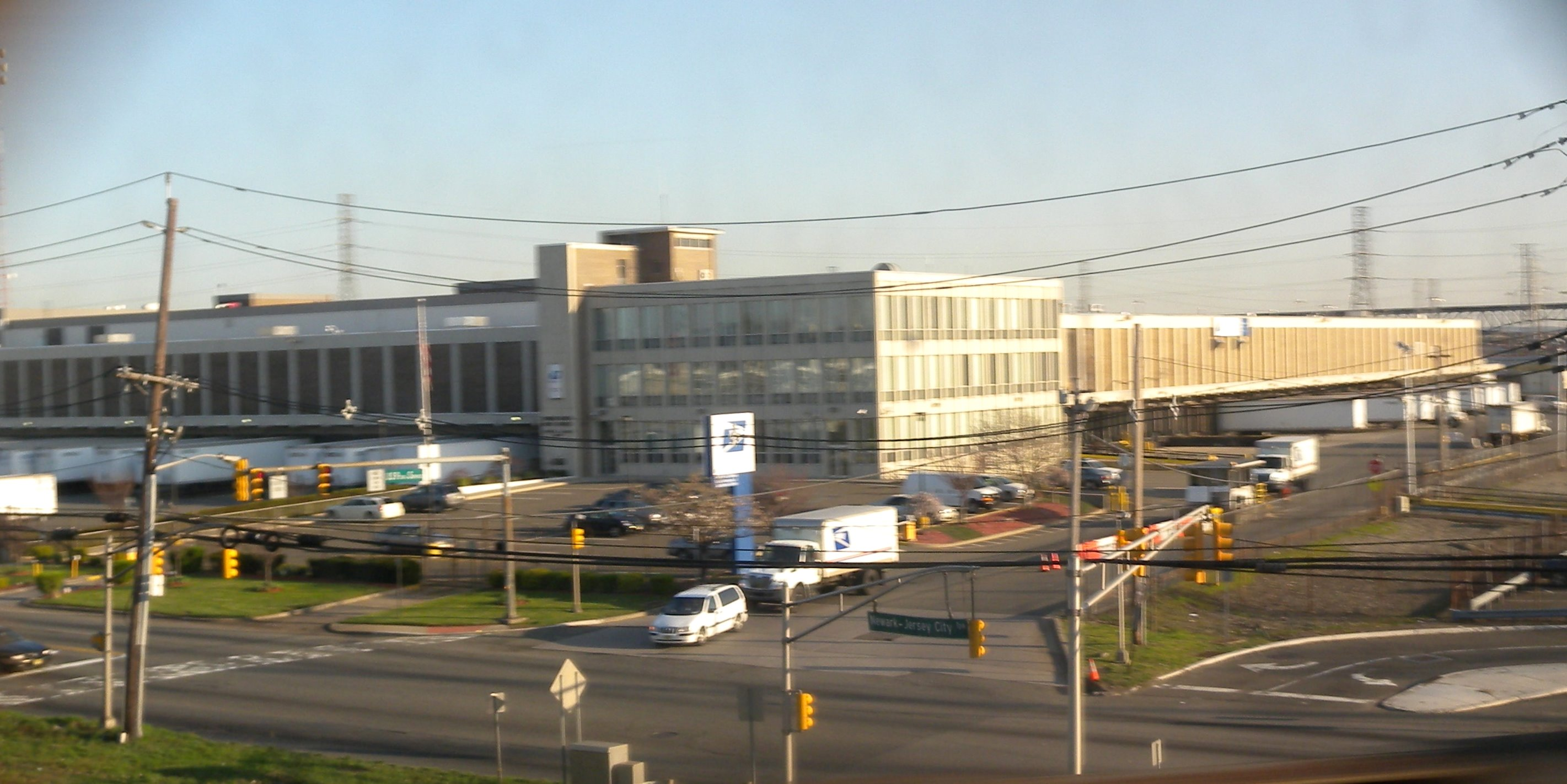
SCF in Kearny, New Jersey

- Dominick V. Daniels (070–073, 079, 088, 089) 850 Newark-Jersey City Turnpike, Kearny, NJ
- Northern New Jersey Metro (074–076, 078) 200 Industrial Ave, Teterboro, NJ
- Trenton (077, 085–087) 680 US-130, Trenton, NJ 08650
- South Jersey (080–084) 421 Benigno Blvd., Bellmawr, NJ 08031

=== New Mexico ===
Note: 880 and 883 are served by El Paso, Texas; 881 and 882 are served by Lubbock, Texas; 885 is assigned out of order to El Paso, Texas; 872, 876, and 886–888 are unassigned.

- Albuquerque (870–871, 873–875, 877–879, 884, Colorado 813, Arizona 865)

=== New York ===
Note: New York 06390 is served by Hartford, Connecticut.

- New York (100–102 Manhattan; 104 The Bronx) Morgan General Mail Facility, 341 Ninth Avenue, New York, NY 10199
- Brooklyn (103 Staten Island; 112 Brooklyn; 116 Far Rockaway) 1050 Forbell Street #2005, Brooklyn, NY 11256
- Westchester (105–109; Connecticut 066, 068, 069) 1000 Westchester Avenue, White Plains, NY 10610
- Queens (111 Long Island City; 113 Flushing; 114 Jamaica) 142-02 20th Avenue, College Point, NY 11356
- Western Nassau (110, 115) 830 Stewart Avenue, Garden City, NY 11599
- Mid-Island (117–119, IRS 005) 160 Duryea Road, Melville
- Albany (120–129), 30 Old Karner Road, Albany
- Syracuse (130–139), 5640 E. Taft Road, Syracuse
- Buffalo (140–143, 147), 1200 William Street, Buffalo
- Rochester (144–146, 148, 149, Pennsylvania 167), 1335 Jefferson Road, Rochester

=== North Carolina ===
Note: North Carolina 279 is served by Norfolk, Virginia. North Carolina 287–289 are served by Greenville, South Carolina.

- Greensboro (270–274, 286) 1120 Pleasant Ridge Rd., Greensboro, NC 27498
- Raleigh (275–277) 1 Floretta Pl., Raleigh, NC 27676
- Rocky Mount (278)
- Charlotte (280–282, South Carolina 297) 2901 Scott Futrell Dr., Charlotte, NC 28228
- Fayetteville (283–285) 301 Green St., Fayetteville, NC 28301

=== North Dakota ===
Note: North Dakota 589 is unassigned.

- Fargo (580–581, 584, Minnesota 565)
- Grand Forks (582–583, Minnesota 567)
- Bismarck (585–588, South Dakota 576)

=== Northern Mariana Islands ===
Northern Mariana Islands are served by the SCF in Barrigada, Guam

=== Ohio ===
Note: Ohio 439 is served by Pittsburgh, Pennsylvania.

- Columbus (430–433, 437–438, 456–458)
- Toledo (434–436)
- Cleveland (440, 441, 448, 449)
- Youngstown (444–445)
- Akron (442–443, 446–447)
- Cincinnati (450–452, IRS 459, Kentucky 410, Indiana 470)
- Dayton (453–455)

=== Oklahoma ===
Note: Oklahoma 739 is served by Amarillo, Texas; 732 and 742 are unassigned; 733 is assigned to Austin, Texas.

- Oklahoma City (730–731, 734–738, 748) 4025 W Reno Ave., Oklahoma City, OK 73147-9805
- Tulsa (740–741, 743–747, 749)

=== Oregon ===
Note: Oregon 979 is served by Boise, Idaho.

- Portland (970–973, 978, Washington 986) 7007 NE Cornfoot Rd., Portland, OR 97218-9300
- Eugene (974, 977) 3148 Gateway St, Springfield, OR 97477-1100
- Medford (975–976) 173 Ehrman Way, Medford, OR 97501-1335

=== Palau ===
See Guam above.

=== Pennsylvania ===
Note: Pennsylvania 193 is served by Wilmington, Delaware. Pennsylvania 167 is served by Rochester, NY. 192 is assigned to the IRS.

- Pittsburgh (150–154, 156, 160–165, West Virginia 260 and 265, Ohio 439) 1001 California Ave, Pittsburgh, PA 15290
- Johnstown (155, 157–159) 235 Jari Dr., Johnstown, PA 15904
- Altoona (166, 168)
- Harrisburg (169–179, 195–196, West Virginia 254) 1425 Crooked Hill Rd., Harrisburg, PA 17107
- Lehigh Valley (180–183) 2299 Highland Ave., Lehigh Valley, PA 18002
- Scranton (184–188)
- Philadelphia (189–192, 194) 7500 Lindbergh Blvd., Philadelphia, PA 19176

=== Puerto Rico ===
- San Juan (006–007, 009, United States Virgin Islands 008) 585 Ave FD Roosevelt Ste 370, San Juan, PR 00936-9312

=== Rhode Island ===
- Providence (028–029, Massachusetts 025–027) 24 Corliss St., Providence, RI 02904

=== South Carolina ===
Note: South Carolina 297 is served by Charlotte, North Carolina; South Carolina 298 is served by Augusta, Georgia

- Columbia (290–292, 295) 2001 Dixiana Rd., West Columbia, SC 29172
- Charleston (294, 299)
- Greenville (293, 296, North Carolina 287–289) 204 Fairforest Way, Greenville, SC 29607

=== South Dakota ===
Note: South Dakota 578 and 579 are unassigned. South Dakota 576 is served by Bismarck, ND.

- Sioux Falls (570–571, Iowa 510–513)
- Dakota Central (572–575) 355 15th St NW, Huron, SD 57399-9998
- Rapid City (577)

=== Tennessee ===
- Nashville (370–372, 384, 385, Kentucky 421 and 422) 525 Royal Pkwy. Rm 9997, Nashville, TN 37230
- Chattanooga (373–374, Georgia 307) 6050 Shallowford Rd., Chattanooga, TN 37421
- Johnson City (376, Virginia 242)
- Knoxville (377–379, Kentucky 407–409, 417–418, 425–426) 1237 E. Weisgarber Rd., Knoxville, TN 37950
- Memphis (IRS 375, 380–383, Mississippi 386 and 388, Arkansas 723, 724) 638 S. 2nd St., Memphis, TN 38101

=== Texas ===
Note: Texas 755, 756, and 759 are served by Shreveport, Louisiana; Texas 771 is unassigned.

- Austin (IRS 733, 765, 786–787, 789) — 8225 Cross Park Dr, Austin, TX 78710
- North Texas (750, 754) — 951 W. Bethel Rd., Coppell, TX 75099
- Dallas (751–753, 757–758) — 401 Tom Landry Fwy, Dallas, TX 75208
- South Houston (770, 772, 774) - 611 Highway 90-A, Missouri City, TX 77489
- North Houston (773, 775, 778) — 4600 Aldine Bender Rd., Houston, TX 77315
- Beaumont (776–777)
- Fort Worth (760–764, 766–767) — 4600 Mark IV Pkwy, Fort Worth, TX 76161
- Abilene (768–769, 795–796)
- Corpus Christi (779, 783–784)
- San Antonio (780–782, 788) — 10410 Perrin Beitel Rd., San Antonio, TX 78284
- McAllen (785)
- Amarillo (790–792, Kansas 679, Oklahoma 739)
- Lubbock (793–794, New Mexico 881–882)
- Midland (797)
- El Paso (798–799, 885, New Mexico 880, 883)

=== Utah ===
Note: Utah 847 is served by Las Vegas, Nevada. 842 is assigned to the IRS. Utah 848 and 849 are unassigned.

- Salt Lake City (840–844, Wyoming 829–831, Nevada 898)
- Provo (845–846)

=== Vermont ===
Note: Vermont 055 is assigned to Middlesex-Essex, Massachusetts.

- White River Junction (050–053, 057–059, New Hampshire 035–037) 195 Sykes Mountain Ave., White River Junction, VT 05001
- Burlington (054, 056) 8 New England Dr., Essex Jct, VT, 05452

=== United States Virgin Islands ===
United States Virgin Islands are served by the SCF in San Juan, Puerto Rico.

=== Virginia ===
Note: Virginia 242 is served by Johnson City, Tennessee; Virginia 246 is served by Charleston, WV.

- Dulles (201, 226–228, West Virginia 268) 44715 Prentice Dr., Sterling, VA 20101
- Northern Virginia (220–223) 8409 Lee Hwy., Merrifield, VA 22081
- Richmond (224–225, 229–232, 238–239, 244) 5801 Technology Blvd, Sandston, VA 23150
- Norfolk (233–237, North Carolina 279) 600 Church St, Norfolk, VA 23501-9908
- Roanoke (240–241, 243, 245) 419 Rutherford Ave. NE, Roanoke, VA 24022

=== Washington ===
Note: Washington 986 is served by Portland, Oregon. 987 is unassigned.

- Seattle (980–982) 10700 27th Ave S, Tukwila, WA 98168
- Tacoma (983–985) 4001 S Pine St, Tacoma, WA 98413-9994
- Wenatchee (988) 3075 Ohme Rd, Wenatchee, WA 98801-9997
- Yakima (989) 205 W Washington Ave; Yakima, WA 98903-9998
- Spokane (990–994, Idaho 835, 838) 2928 S Spotted Rd, Spokane, WA 99224

=== West Virginia ===
Note: West Virginia 254 is served by Harrisburg, Pennsylvania; West Virginia 267 is served by Baltimore, Maryland; West Virginia 260 and 265 are served by Pittsburgh, Pennsylvania; West Virginia 268 is served by Dulles, Virginia; 269 was deleted in 1965.

- Charleston (247–253, 255–259, 261–264, 266; Virginia 246; Kentucky 411, 412, 415, 416) 1000 Centre Way, Charleston, WV 25309

=== Wisconsin ===
Note: Wisconsin 540 & 546 are served by St. Paul, Minnesota. 533 & 536 are unassigned.

- Milwaukee (530–532, 534, 549)
- Madison (535, 537–539) 3902 Milwaukee St., Madison, WI 53714
- Green Bay (541–545)
- Eau Claire (547–548)

=== Wyoming ===
Note: Wyoming 821 is served by Billings, Montana. Wyoming 829–831 are served by Salt Lake City, Utah.

- Cheyenne (820, 822–823) 4800 Converse Ave., Cheyenne, WY 82009
- Casper (824–828) 411 N. Forest Dr., Casper, WY 82609

== U.S Military or diplomatic ==
The Military Postal Service Agency (MPSA) takes control of First Class mail in Chicago or Miami and then routes it to its intended destination.

Note: for military postal purposes Canada, Africa, and the Middle East are in Europe.

=== Armed Forces Americas ===
Armed Forces Americas is served by ISC Miami FL

- Latin America and the Caribbean (340)

=== Armed Forces Europe ===
Note: Armed Forces Europe is served by ISC Chicago IL.

- Germany (090–093)
- Contingency (093)
- United Kingdom (094)
- Ships (095)
- Italy and Spain (096)
- Other Europe (097)
- Middle East/Africa (098–099)

=== Armed Forces Pacific ===
Armed Forces Pacific is served by ISC Chicago IL

- Korea (962)
- Japan (963)
- Philippines (964)
- Other Pacific (965)
- Ships (966)

== Sources ==
- L002 3-Digit ZIP Code Prefix Matrix, Effective Date 2017-04-01, from USPS Facility Access and Shipment Tracking (FAST)
- L005 3-Digit ZIP Code Prefix Groups—SCF Sortation, Effective Date 2017-04-01, from USPS Facilities Access and Shipment Tracking (FAST)
- G030 Postal Zones
- G042 Pricing and Classification Service Center
- [USPS Destination Delivery Unit (DDU) List - Capital Metro Area]
- USPS Destination Delivery Unit (DDU) List - Eastern Area
- USPS Destination Delivery Unit (DDU) List - Great Lakes Area
- USPS Destination Delivery Unit (DDU) List - New York Metro Area
- USPS Destination Delivery Unit (DDU) List - Northeast Area
- USPS Destination Delivery Unit (DDU) List - Pacific Area
- USPS Destination Delivery Unit (DDU) List - Southeast Area
- USPS Destination Delivery Unit (DDU) List - Southwest Area
- USPS Destination Delivery Unit (DDU) List - Western Area
- 5 FAH-10 H-413 ADDRESS FORMATS FOR APO/FPO POSTS
