= Optional information line =

Line above postal address on U.S. mail

An optional information line is a line above the postal address on mail in the United States. The lines are usually seen on bulk mail to indicate the sorting and separation that allows the mail to have a lower postal rate.

Examples of bulk mail that have information lines include First-Class Mail, periodicals, USPS Marketing Mail, and bound printed matter.

Possible optional information lines include the optional endorsement line (OEL), an address change service (ACS) participant code, carrier route information, and a mailer's keyline.

== Optional endorsement line ==
Examples of OEL include:

type	example
Carrier route for periodicals (basic)	* * * * * * * * * * * * * * * * * * CAR-RT LOT**C-001
Enhanced carrier route USPS Marketing Mail (basic)	* * * * * * * * * * * * * * * * * * * * * ECRLOT**C-001
all to same 3-digit ZIP Code prefix	* * * * * * * * * * * * * * * * * * * * * * * * 3-DIGIT 771
bound printed matter	* * * * * * * * * * * * * * * * CAR-RT SORT**C-001

== Carrier route information ==
The carrier route information specifies which route at that Post Office handles the mail. The route consists of a type or prefix followed by a three-digit number. Route prefixes and types are:

- "B" for "post office box section"
- "C" for "carrier route"
- "G" for "general delivery unit"
- "H" for "highway contract route"
- "R" for "rural route"

The number after the prefix on some mail may consist of the last two digits of the ZIP Code followed by the 3-digit route number.
