= Otto Hornung =

British philatelist (1920–2013)

- Born: 10 September 1920; Ostrava, Czechoslovakia
- Died: 8 January 2013 (aged 92–93)
- Occupation: Philatelist

Otto Hornung (10 September 1920 in Ostrava – 8 January 2013) was a distinguished philatelist and philatelic journalist who won Gold medals at several philatelic exhibitions and was a Fellow of The Royal Philatelic Society London. He signed the Roll of Distinguished Philatelists in 1993 and lived in Wembley, London.

== Early life ==
Whilst in Ostrava, Hornung witnessed the German invasion of Czechoslovakia in March 1939 but managed to escape to Bogumin, then in unoccupied Poland, dressed as a postman in the mail wagon of a goods train. After that he joined the Czechoslovak Legion. Hornung spoke Polish and Czech fluently as both were used freely in Ostrava.

== Philatelic career ==
Hornung was a former Secretary of the Philatelic Traders Society and organiser of the Stampex show. He was also a founder member of the Association Internationale des Journalistes Philateliques (AIJP) in 1952 and its former President. As a philatelist, Hornung specialised in the stamps and postal history of Turkey and won Large Gold medals at India 1989, New Zealand 1990, London 1990, Philatokyo 1991 and Granada 1992.

== Philatelic memberships ==
Hornung was a member of the following societies (amongst others):

- Czechoslovak Philatelic Society of Great Britain
- The Oriental Philatelic Association of London
- International Association of Philatelic Journalists
- Royal Philatelic Society London

== Philatelic publications ==
- The Illustrated Encyclopedia of Stamp Collecting, Hamlyn, London, 1970. ISBN 0-600-01797-4
- Wie Sammle Ich Richtig Briefmarken, Verlag Werner Dausien, 1972. ISBN 3-7684-4233-0 (German language)
- The Czecho-Slovak Legion in Poland and Russia 1939-1945 and Czechoslovaks in the Middle East, 1940 - 1943, Czechoslovak Philatelic Society of Great Britain, 2003. (With Dr. Vratislav Palkoska)
- The Early Postal History of Carpatho-Ukraine with Particular Reference to The Usage Of The First Postage Stamps of Austria, 2007. ISBN 978-0-9536555-9-5
