= Postage =

Postage may refer to:

- Mail, or post, a system for physically transporting postcards, letters, and parcels
- Postage stamp, small piece of paper indicating proof of payment for mail
- Postage (album), a 2003 album by Supergroove

== See also ==
- Postage rate (disambiguation)
