= Postage rate =

Postage rate is amount charged by a postal service to transport and deliver mail. It may refer to:

- List of postal rates in the British Mandate of Palestine
- List of Ottoman postal rates in Palestine
- History of United States postage rates
- Soviet and post-Soviet postage rates
