= Adolf Passer =

Austrian philatelist (1864–1938)

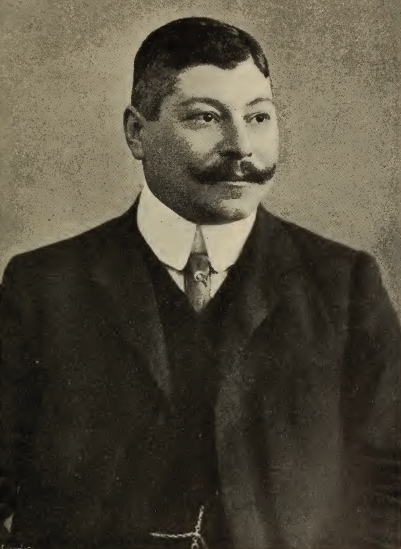
- Adolf Passer, c.1906
- Born: c. 1864; Prague, Kingdom of Bohemia, Austrian Empire
- Died: 14 August 1938 (aged 73–74); Franzensbad, Czechoslovakia
- Known for: Philatelic collection; The Stamps of Turkey (1938)

Adolf Passer FRPSL (c. 1864 – 14 August 1938) was an Austrian philatelist and authority on the stamps of Austria, Bosnia and Herzegovina and the Ottoman Empire and Turkey.

A stamp collector from a young age, Passer was able to exploit his professional connections in the shipping industry to expand his collection when he worked in London in the late 1880s. He continued to develop his collection on his return to Austria, joining philatelic societies and winning gold medals for his collection at international exhibitions. He was the organiser of the Vienna Philatelic Exhibition of 1911, for which he was awarded a medal by Emperor Franz Joseph I.

He wrote a book on the stamps of Bosnia and Herzegovina and another on those of the Ottoman Empire and Turkey, published by the Royal Philatelic Society, London, in 1938 and regarded at the time as almost the last word on the subject.

== Early life and family ==
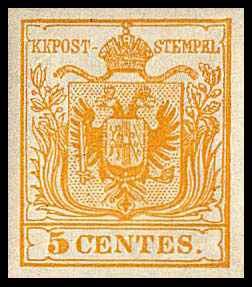
1850 stamp of Lombardy-Venetia

Adolf Passer was born in Prague around 1864, then in the Austrian Empire, which three years later would become part of the Austro-Hungarian Empire (Dual Monarchy). He began to collect stamps at the age of nine when an uncle bought him a collection of the issues of the German states at a fair. He sold his collection on entering compulsory military service in Austria.

== Philatelic career ==
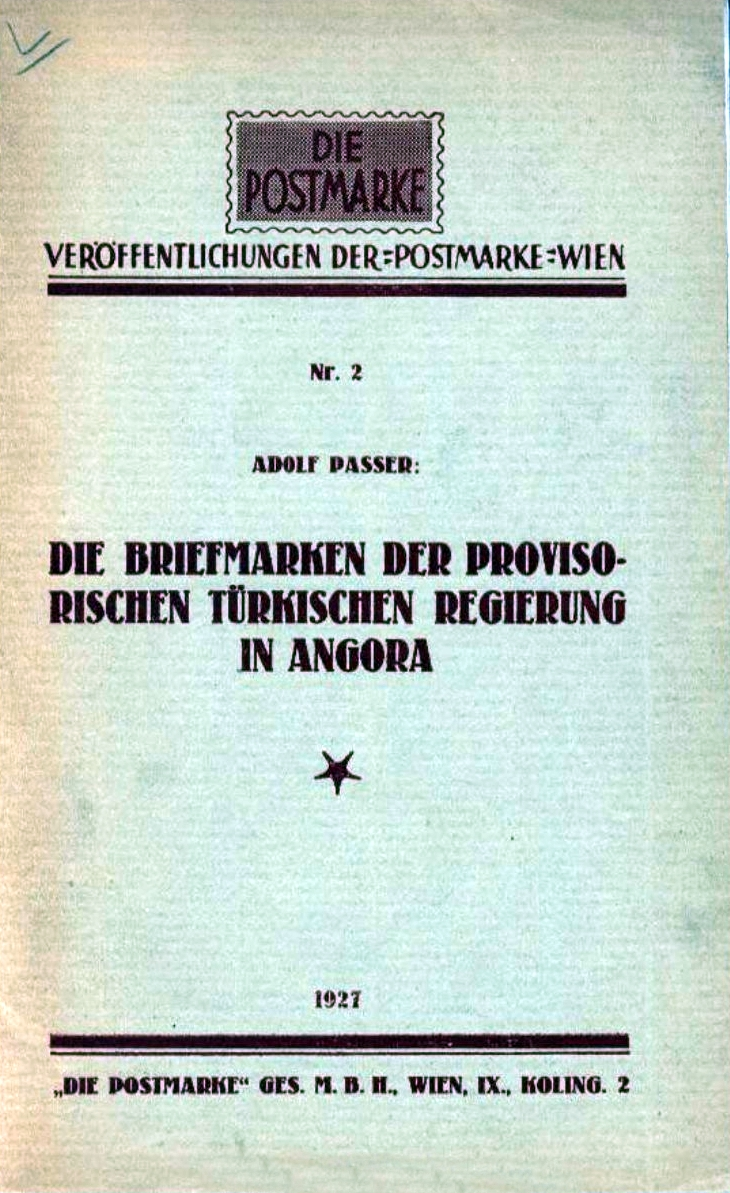
Die Briefmarken der provisorischen Türkischen Regierung in Angora (1927)

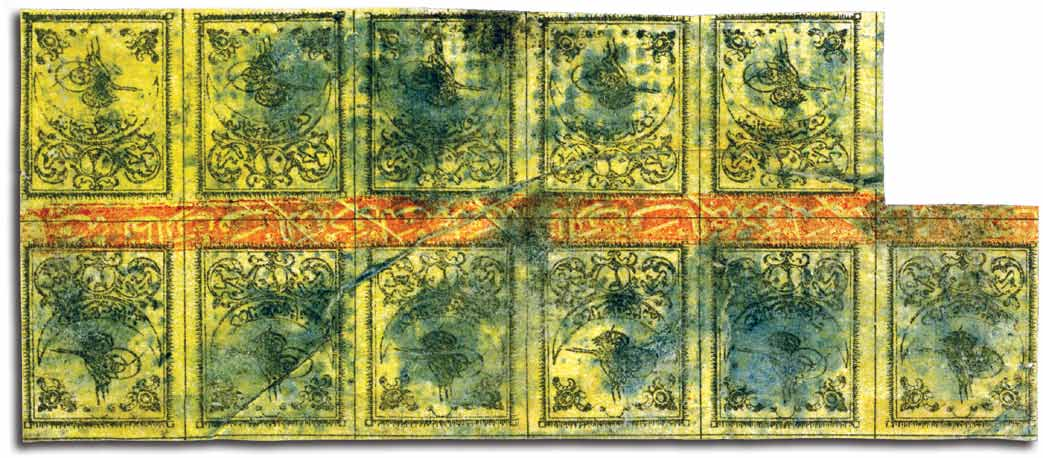
Tête-bêche block of 20pa black on yellow tughra stamps of the Ottoman Empire, 1863. Formerly in the Passer collection and the largest known multiple of these stamps.

Passer travelled to London in 1885 where he worked in a shipping firm, his interest in philately being rekindled by the opportunities to collect stamps that arose from his employer's business. He was able to acquire many stamps from British colonies in Africa and Australia, and by exchange with professional colleagues, and continued to expand his collection of British colonial stamps when he returned to Prague in 1888. He was elected to the Philatelic Society of London (later the Royal Philatelic Society London) in November 1891 on the proposal of Dr Franz Kalckhoff, president of the Berlin Philatelic Club.

Passer sold most of his collection in 1893 when he had just met the woman who would become his wife and he was "more bent on wooing than collecting postage stamps". After his marriage in 1894, he began to collect again, specialising in the stamps of Austria and trying to obtain them in pairs and blocks. He observed that the early stamps of his country were a difficult study due to the numerous perforation changes, but cheaper than they should be because so few people understood them.

An active exhibitor at and organiser of philatelic exhibitions, Passer won a gold medal at the 1904 exhibition in Berlin for a display of stamps from Austria, Hungary, Lombardy and Bosnia. He organised the Vienna Philatelic Exhibition 1911, for which he was awarded the Goldene Verdienstkreuz mit der Krone (Gold Cross of Merit of the Crown) by Emperor Franz Joseph I. However, his membership of the London society was severed during the First World War, probably during the cull of 11 "enemy aliens" by the society.

From the 1920s, Passer increasingly specialised in the stamps of the Ottoman Empire and the Turkish Republic, becoming known as the "greatest authority" on them and writing a book on the first issue that was published in 1925. In 1927, he published a book on the postage stamps of the provisional Turkish government in Angora (Ankara) and in 1930 a work on the stamps of Bosnia and Herzegovina. Among his collection, which at its height was of 63,000 stamps, was an 1863 tête-bêche block of 20pa black on yellow tughra stamps of the Ottoman Empire, the first stamps of the empire and of Turkey, which in 2013 was reckoned the largest known multiple of these stamps. The block later entered the Orhan Brandt and Tevfik Kuyaş collections.

Passer rejoined the Royal Philatelic Society London in 1931 and was elected a fellow the same year. In 1934, he visited England and gave a display of tughra stamps before the members of the Royal Philatelic Society London for which he received the Tilleard Medal in 1935. His magnum opus, The Stamps of Turkey, was published by the society in 1938 and was described by them as "monumental" and "very nearly the last word on this extensive and difficult subject."

== Death and legacy ==
Passer died in Františkovy Lázně (Franzensbad), in what is now the Czech Republic, on 14 August 1938 at the age of 74. He received obituaries in The London Philatelist, and Stamp Lover, the journal of the National Philatelic Society. In 2013, the auction of the former Kuhut Alanyali collection by David Feldman S.A. in Geneva included many items formerly in the Passer collection.

== Books ==
- Die türkischen Postwertzeichen von 1863. Mit 5 Lichtdrucktafeln, Prague, 1925. OCLC 8983431
- Die Briefmarken der provisorischen Türkischen Regierung in Angora. Die Postmarke, Vienna, 1927. OCLC 8983415
- Die Postwertzeichen von Bosnien und der Herzegovina. Grass, Barth & Comp., Prague, 1930. OCLC 17879304
- The Stamps of Turkey. Royal Philatelic Society, London, 1938. (Edited by J. H. Barron and John Simons) OCLC 752588071

== See also ==
- Mehmet Ismet Başaran
