= Mehmet Ismet Başaran =

Turkish-born British chemical engineer and philatelist

- Born: August 1953 (age 72); Turkey
- Occupation: Chemical engineer
- Known for: Collection of tughra stamps of the Ottoman Empire

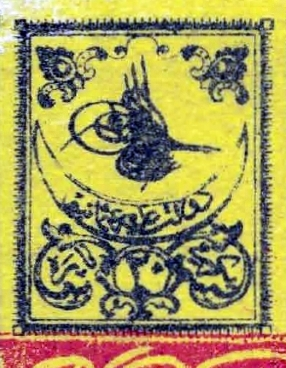
20 Para stamp of the first issue of the Ottoman Empire 1863–65 (2nd printing) (not from the Başaran collection)

Tughra of Abdülaziz

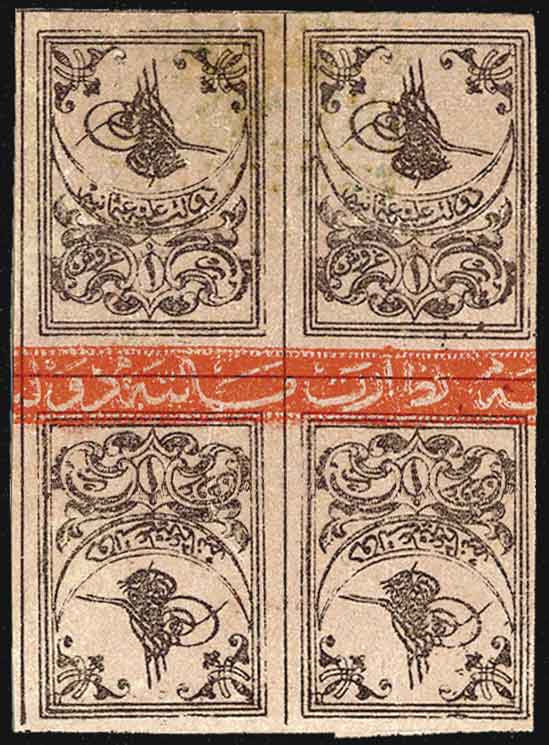
Block of four tête-bêche tughra stamps with central control band in red (not from the Başaran collection)

Mehmet Ismet Başaran (born August 1953) is a Turkish-born British chemical engineer and philatelist. He is an authority on the tughra (or toughra) stamps of 1863–65 of the Ottoman Empire and has won several gold medals for his collection of those issues. He has written two books on the stamps as well as a number of articles about them. He is a former fellow of the Royal Philatelic Society London and president of the Oriental Philatelic Association of London.

== Early life and career ==
Mehmet Başaran was born in Turkey in August 1953. He moved to the United Kingdom at 16 years of age for educational reasons and graduated in chemical engineering, making his home in the U.K. He later worked as a consultant specialising in the design and project management of floating production systems for the oil and gas industries.

== Philately ==
Başaran has specialised in collecting the tughra stamps of the Ottoman Empire (1863–65) since the 1970s, a task made more difficult by the absence of any contemporary official records about the issue. The stamps are the first stamps of the empire and regarded as the first stamps of Turkey. Proofs were produced in 1862 and the final stamps released in 1863. They acquired their name because the central part of the design shows the tughra of the reigning sultan at the time, Abdulaziz, and reads "Abdul Aziz Khan, son of Mohammed the Victorious". The design is completely abstract due to the Muslim faith of the Ottoman rulers. A red band of text was added by the Ministry of Finance at the base of each stamp in order to authorise them for postal use. Due to difficulties with the setting of the first printing of the stamps, the second printing, with a wider space between each stamp to allow for the control band, was actually the first printing released in January 1863 with the first and third printings only being released after the second was exhausted.

He first exhibited his collection at Stampex in London in 2002 and won the Silver Mailcoach Trophy, the Stanley Gibbons Cup for best 19th-century exhibit, and the NPS QEII Silver Salver for the best exhibit by a first time competitor as well as a gold medal – the first time a new exhibitor at the show had won such a haul of medals. The display has also won large gold medals at the Espana 2004 stamp exhibition, at Israel 2008 and World Stamp Championship in Tel Aviv, and at the London 2010 International Stamp Exhibition.

Başaran is a former fellow of the Royal Philatelic Society London, and in 2016 was president of the Oriental Philatelic Association of London.

== Selected publications ==
- "1862 Tughra Proofs of Turkey – The New Discovery", OPAL, May 2005, pp. 2–20.
- "The 1862 Tughra Proofs of Turkey", The London Philatelist, Vol. 115 (2006), pp. 58–66.
- Tughra Stamps: (First Stamps of the Ottoman Empire Issued 1863). M. I. Basaran, 2007.
- Cover Story: "One Man's Journey in to the Unknown". Part 2. Tughra Stamps on Cover 1863–1865. M. I. Basaran, 2010.
