= Postage stamps and postal history of Turkey =

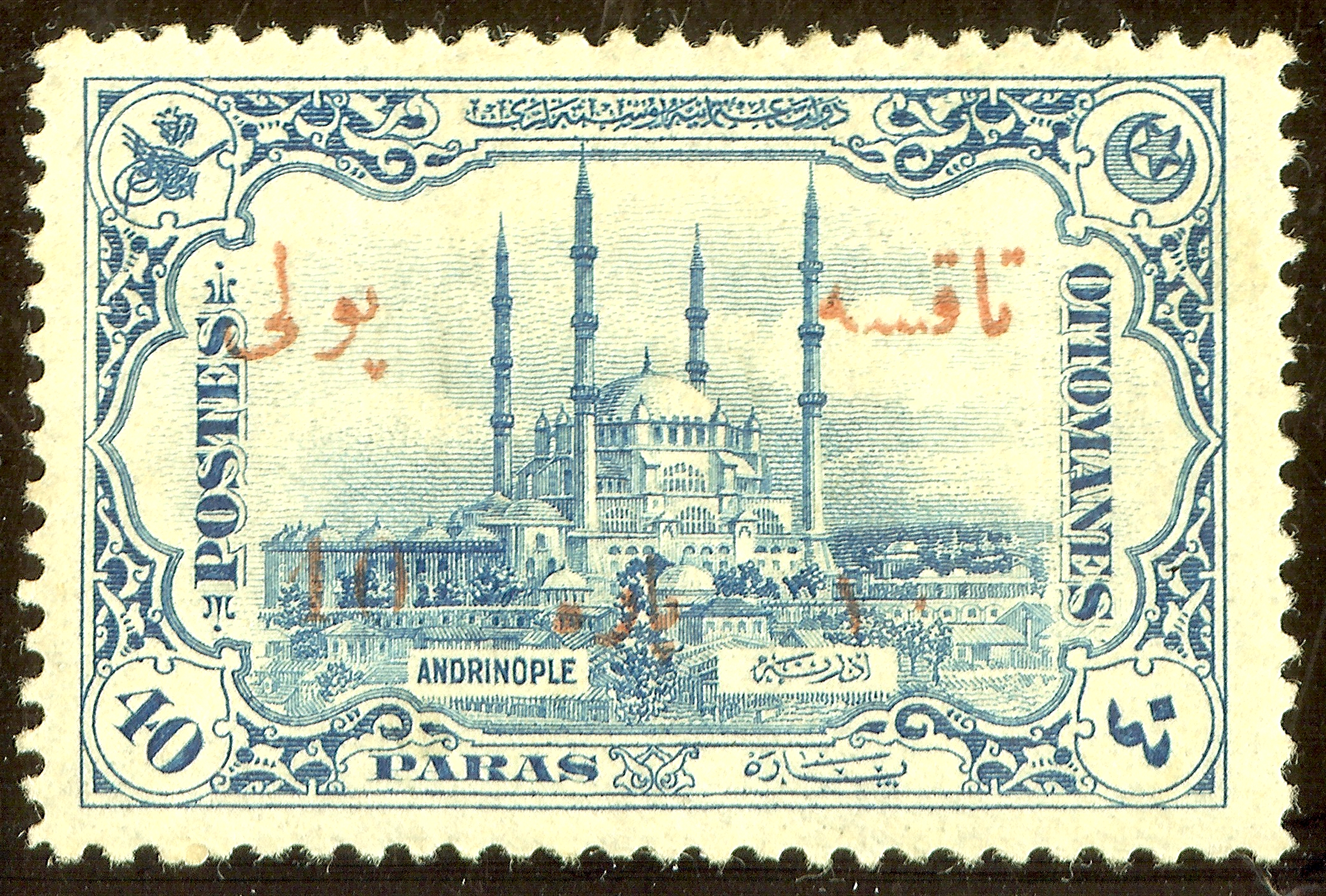
Selimiye Mosque, Adrianople, 1913

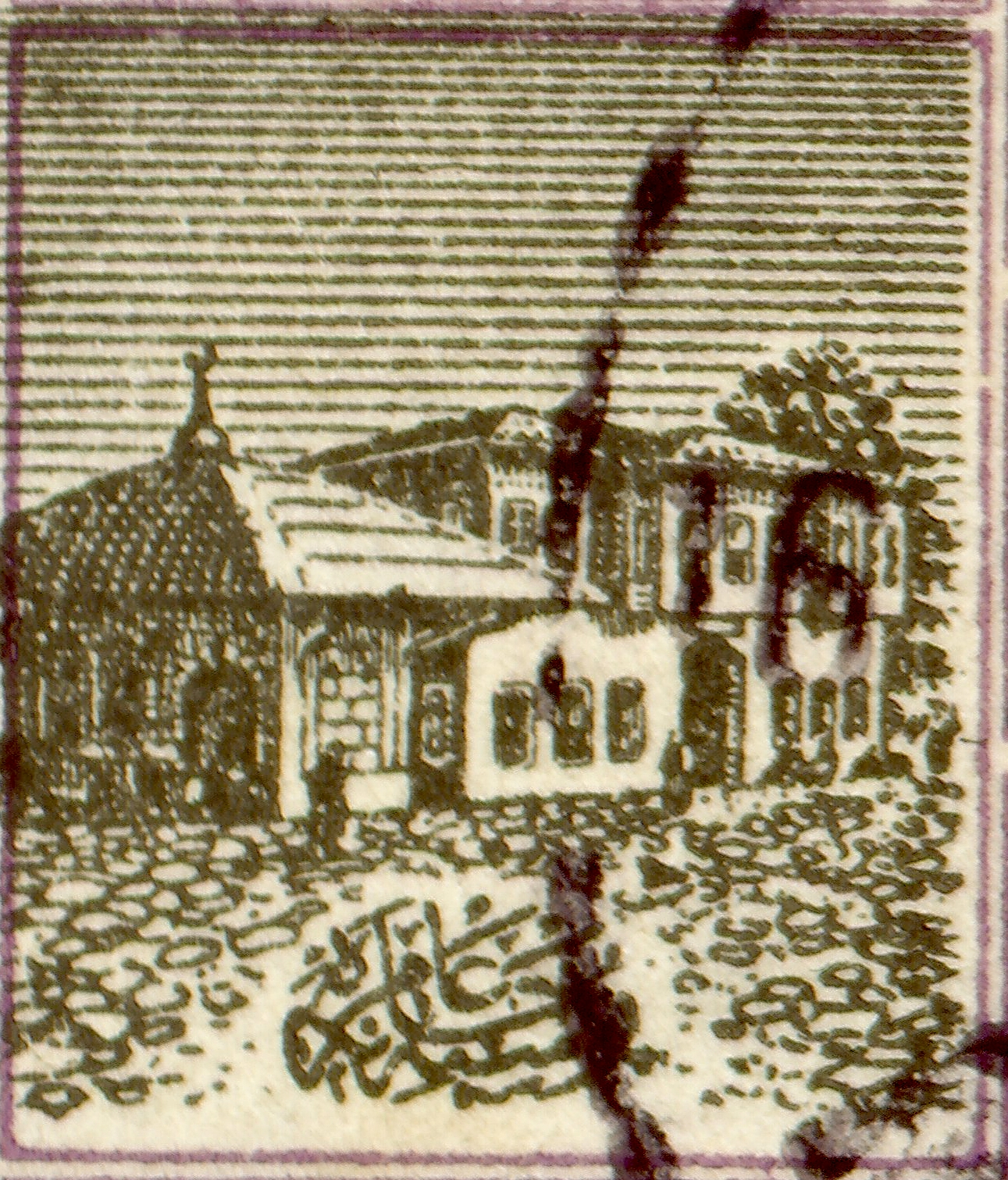
Old General Post Office, Constantinople, c. 1865

The postal history of Turkey and its predecessor state, the Ottoman Empire, dates to the 18th century when foreign countries maintained courier services through their consular offices in the Empire. Although delayed in the development of its own postal service, in 1863 the Ottoman Empire became the second independent country in Asia (after Russia) to issue adhesive postage stamps, and in 1875, it became a founding member of the General Postal Union, soon to become the Universal Postal Union. The Ottoman Empire became the Republic of Turkey in 1923, and in the following years, its postal service became more modernized and efficient and its postage stamps expertly designed and manufactured.

The Ottoman Empire's early or "classic" stamp issues between 1863 and 1888 are popular among philatelists, and its postal cancellations have received extensive study. Philatelists collect stamps used in various parts of the Ottoman Empire, such as Palestine, Jordan, Lebanon, and Greece. Turkey's stamps also have a complex history of overprints of interest to philatelists.

== Ottoman Empire ==
=== Early mail service ===
In the 18th century, foreign countries maintained courier services through their official missions in the Empire, to permit transportation of mail between those countries and Constantinople. Nine countries had negotiated "Capitulations" or treaties with the Ottomans, which granted various extraterritorial rights in exchange for trade opportunities. Such agreements permitted Russia (1720 and 1783), Austria (1739), France (1812), Great Britain (1832) and Greece (1834), as well as Germany, Italy, Poland, and Romania, to maintain post offices in the Ottoman Empire. Some of these developed into public mail services, used to transmit mail to Europe.

The Ottoman Empire itself did not maintain a regular public mail service until 1840, when a service was established between Constantinople and other major cities in the country. As late as 1863, there were only 63 domestic post offices in the entire empire, and service was sporadic and slow.

=== Tughra issue ===
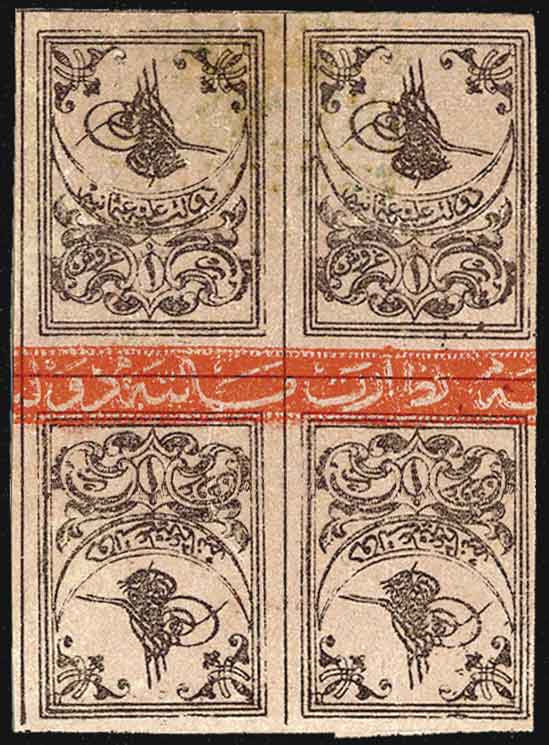
Tughra issue (1863) with red control band.

On January 1, 1863, the Ottoman Empire issued its first adhesive postage stamps. It was the second independent country in Asia to issue adhesive stamps, preceded only by Russia in 1858, and two British colonies, Scinde District of India in 1852, India itself in 1854 and Ceylon in 1857. The Ottoman Empire's stamps came less than two years after its neighbor and former territory, Greece (independent 1832), issued its first stamps.

The design consists of the tughra, the emblem of sovereignty, for the then current ruler Sultan Abdülaziz, over a crescent bearing the inscription in Ottoman Turkish Devleti Aliye Osmaniye, or "The Sublime Ottoman Empire". Between some of the stamps there is a control band with the words Nazareti Maliye devleti aliye, or "Ministry of Finance of the Imperial Government". The stamp was designed and lithographed at the Constantinople mint, and the writing is entirely in Turkish using Arabic script. The issue includes four denominations issued as regular postage stamps, and the same four values as postage due stamps. Including paper variants, a total of 10 Scott catalogue numbers have been assigned the issue.

=== "Duloz" issue ===
"Dissatisfied" with the first issue as compared with "the well-executed stamps of other countries", the Ottoman Empire turned to France for its second issue of postage stamps, following Greece's decision to have its first stamps printed in Paris. Commonly known as the Duloz issue, it was engraved by a Frenchman, Mr. "Duloz", and originally printed by the Poitevin firm in Paris. The engraver has been identified as Pierre Edelestand Stanislas Dulos (1820–1874). Dulos, as his name is correctly spelled, was a highly skilled technical engraver and the inventor of a chemical process to produce recess or relief engraving plates, and engraved many French revenue stamps. The design was apparently prepared by the Ottoman Ministry of Finance, but the name of the designer is unknown. The Duloz stamps were issued from 1865 to 1876, although two were overprinted for use in 1881–1882, and continued to be used for some time as the subsequent Empire issue was not valid for domestic postage until 1888 (see below). In 1868, printing plates for the stamps were sent to Constantinople, where the remaining Duloz stamps were printed. Some of the subsequent printings were poorly printed and badly perforated.

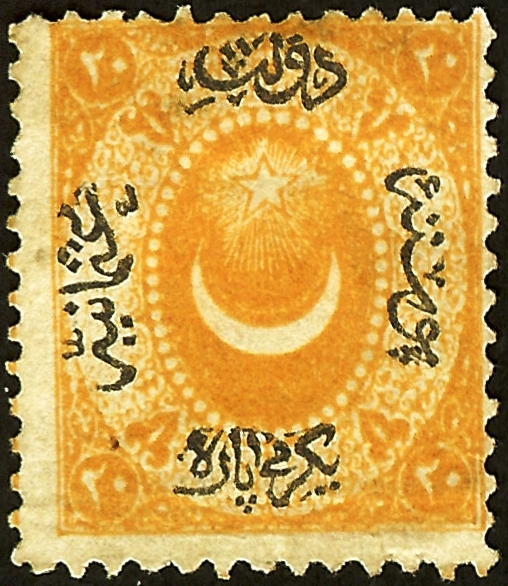
20 para Duloz issue 1865.

The Duloz stamps were typographed or relief printed and the design consists of a central oval enclosing a crescent and star with radiating lines, and "have a distinctly oriental character". Each value was printed in a single color. Turkish writing in Arabic script is overprinted on the oval in black, stating Postai devleti Osmaniye or "Post of the Ottoman Empire". The bottom inscription states the denomination in para, or fortieths of a piastre (kuruş), and accordingly differs on each value.

The Duloz stamps were reprinted in a series of issues with different colors and overprint script, from 1865 to 1882. Scott assigns 46 primary catalog numbers to the Duloz stamps, plus 29 numbers to the postage dues.

Effective July 1, 1875, the Ottoman Empire became a founding member of the General Postal Union, soon to become the Universal Postal Union, a multi-country treaty facilitating and standardizing the transport of mail between members. In January 1876 the Duloz stamps were overprinted with the values in western numerals (in piastres, not para) and French abbreviations as "a provisional series for franking letters to countries belonging to the Universal Postal Union". The Ottoman Empire hoped that joining the UPU would eliminate the foreign post offices operating in the country, but that did not occur as the foreign post offices continued to be competitive.

=== Empire issue ===
The Empire issue was first issued in September 1876, following the Ottoman Empire's entry into the Universal Postal Union, and unlike the preceding Duloz issue, bore the name of the country and the values in Western characters as well as Arabic. They were intended for use to countries in the UPU, but in March 1888 became officially valid for domestic use. The Empire stamps were issued from 1876 to 1890, and the basic postage stamps, not counting overprinted stamps, are assigned a total of 32 catalog numbers by Scott, including three postage dues.

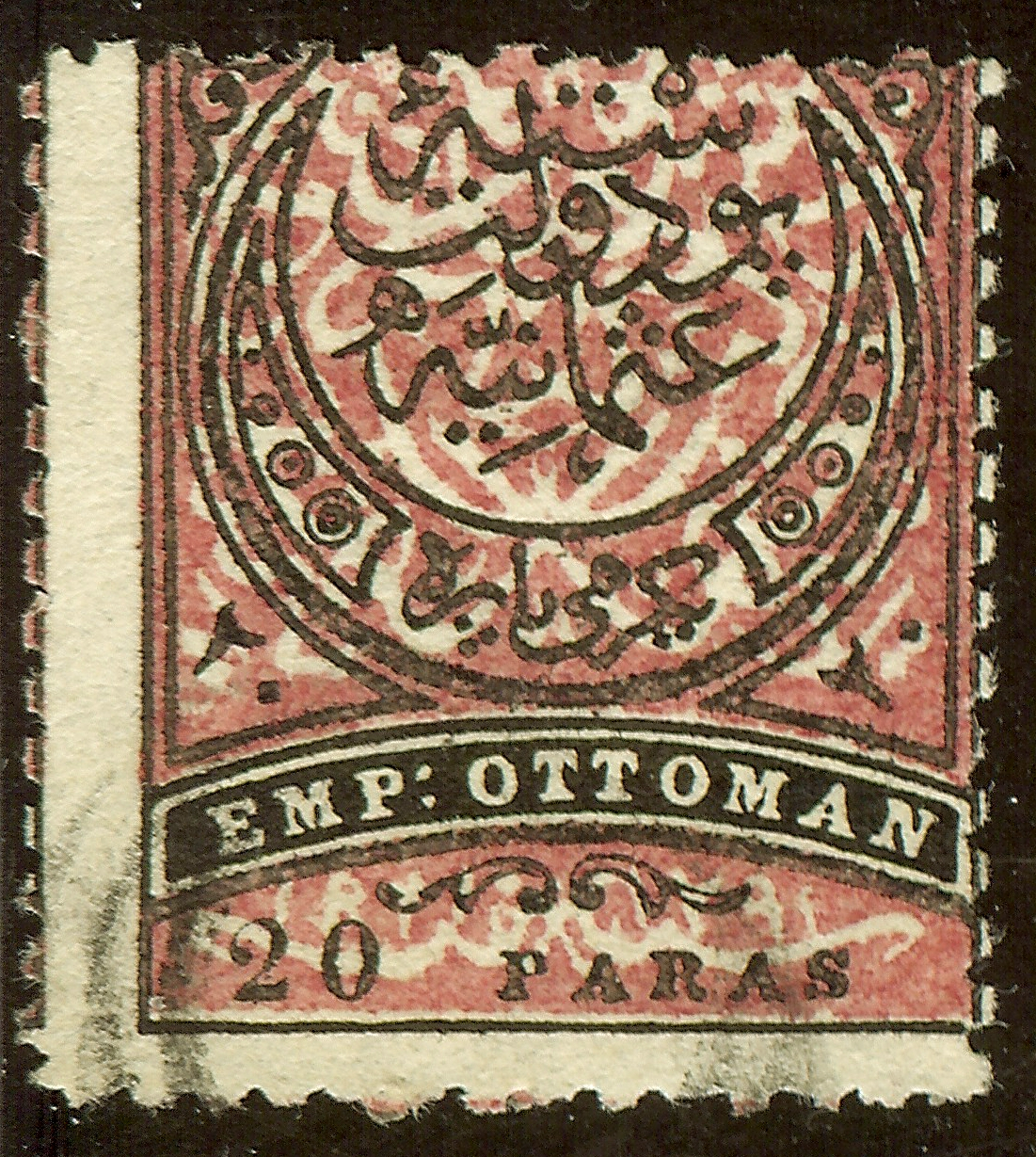
Empire issue 1880–1884

The design of the Empire issue consists of a crescent, with ends pointing upward, surrounding Arabic script, which reads, like the Duloz stamps, "Post of the Ottoman Empire". In the bottom center of the crescent itself appears, also in Arabic writing, the denomination, e.g. 20 Paras or 2 Piastres. In side-panels to the lower left and right of the crescent appear only the numerical value, but in Turkish numerals. Below the crescent is a label with the works EMP: OTTOMAN, that is, Ottoman Empire, and below the label is the value in western numerals and letters, e.g. "2 Piastres".

The stamps were typographed in two colors, except for the postage dues, which were printed only in black. There is a background composed of calligraphic letters, in mirror image, reading Postai devleti Osmaniye, or "Post of the Ottoman Empire", and the Turkish year date 1291, equivalent to 1875. The color combinations used are often striking.

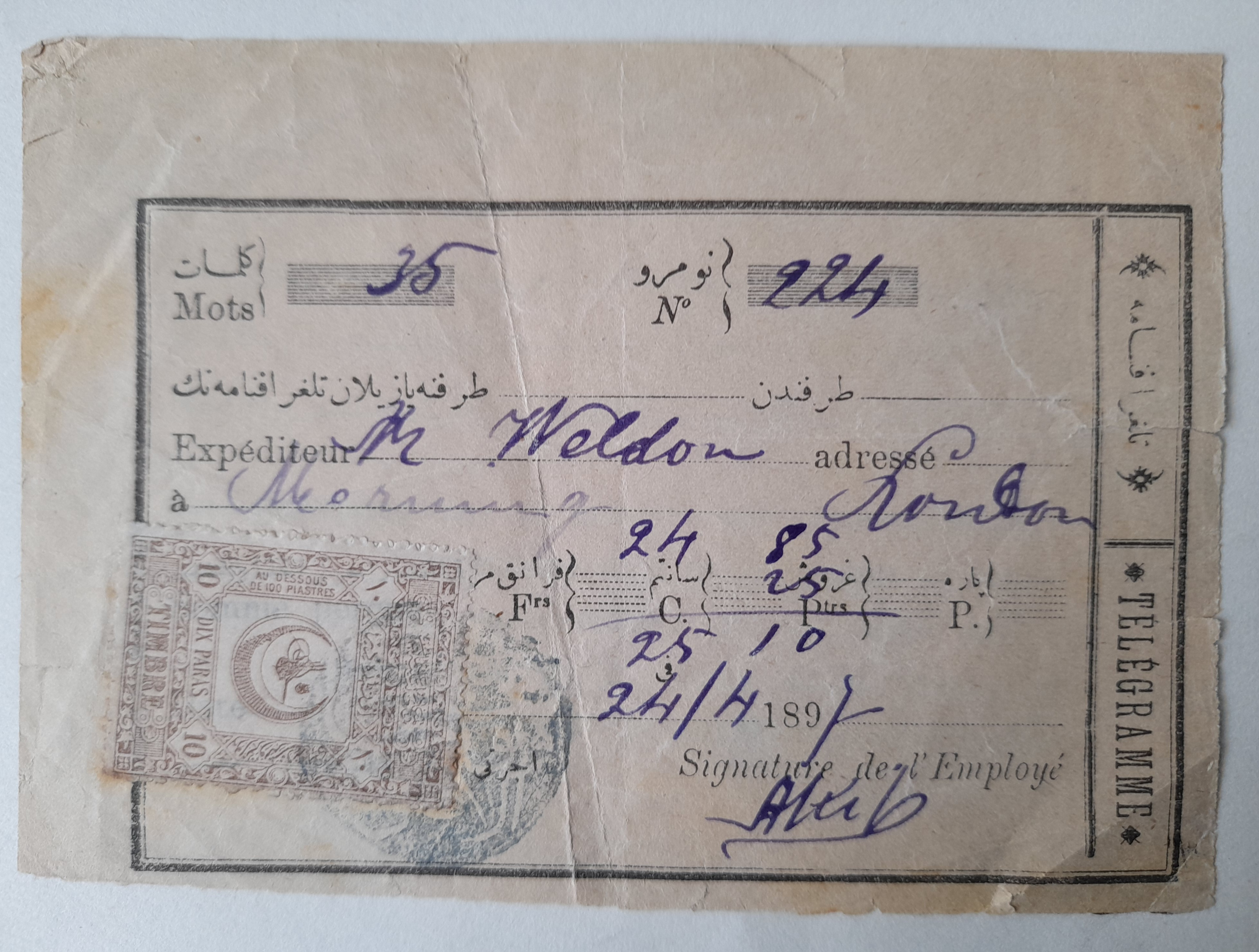
1890 10 Paras Tax stamp on Telegram receipt, M Weldon 35 words, April 24, 1897

The Ottoman administration also issued revenue or tax stamps in 1890.

=== To the end of the Nineteenth century ===
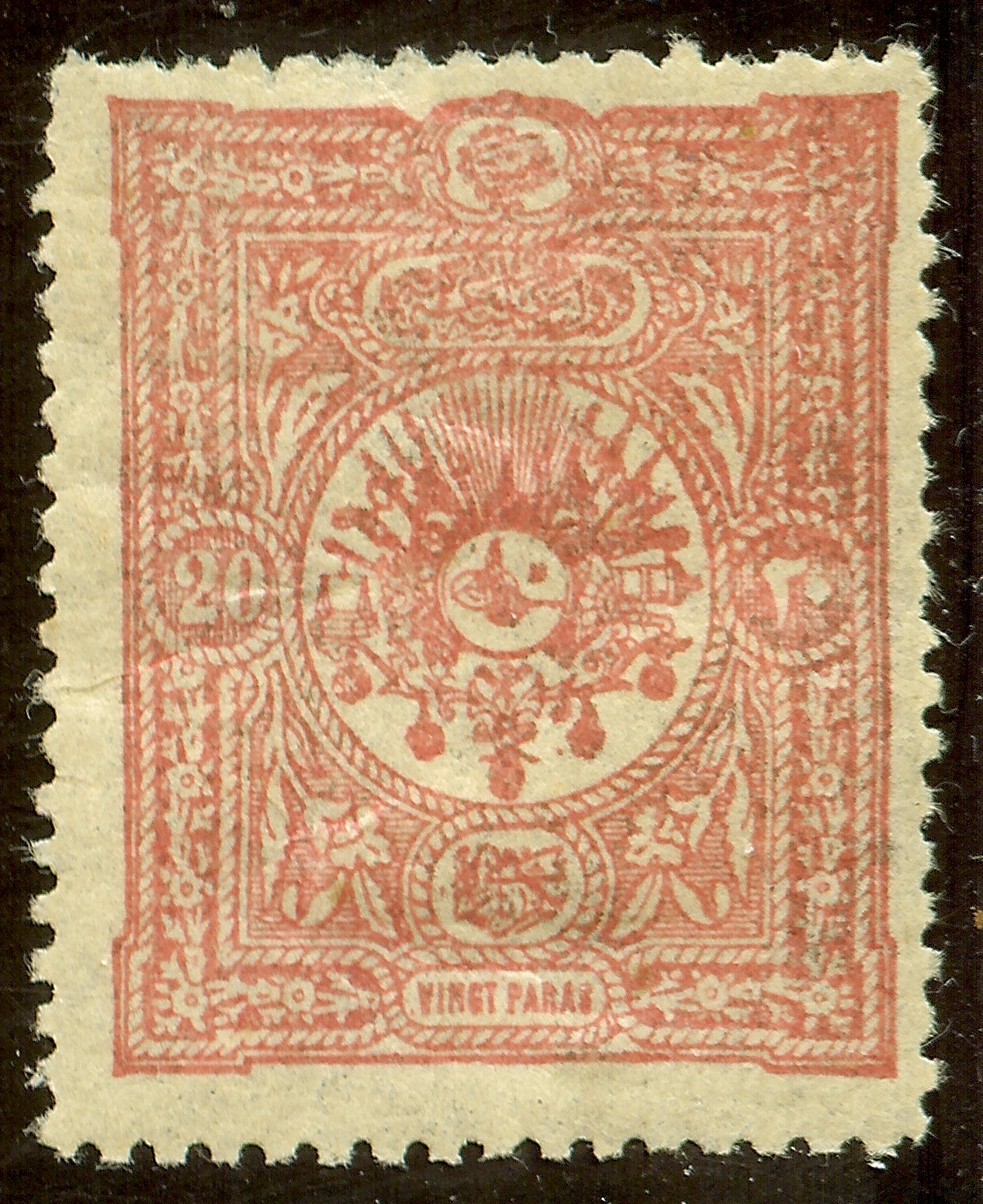
20 Paras Arms and Tughra, 1898

In 1892, the Ottoman Empire issued a series of large stamps with an intricate design known by philatelists as the "Arms and Tughra" issue, the only western writing being the value both in numerals and spelled out in French. The center of the stamps bears the Ottoman coat of arms surrounding the tughra of Abdul Hamid II. Stamps were issued for regular postage and for postage due and were overprinted for use as newspaper stamps and for other purposes.

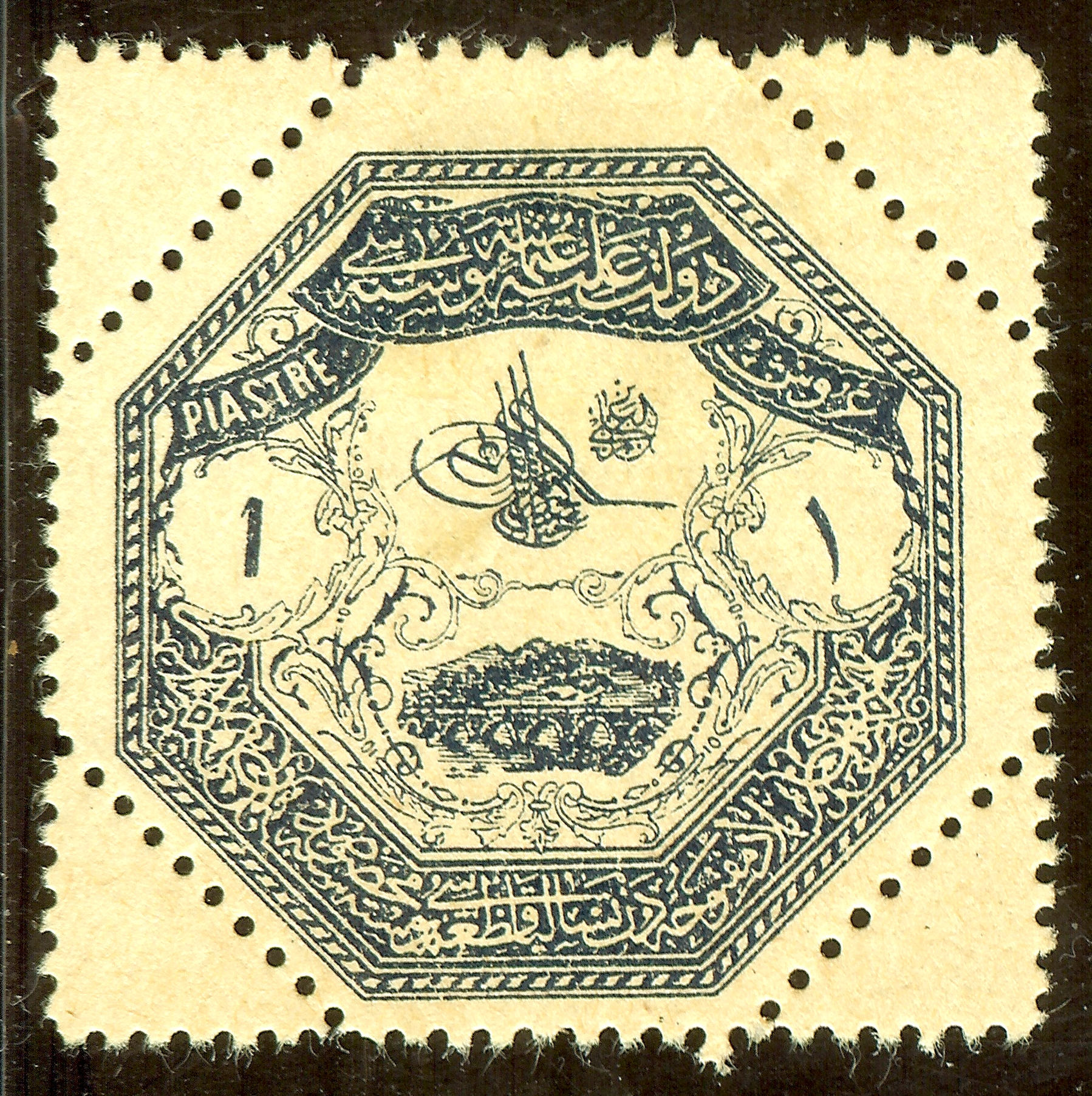
1 Piastre military stamp, 1898, world's first octagonally perforated stamp

In 1898 the Ottoman Empire issued a series of stamps for its armed forces occupying Thessaly during the Greco-Turkish War. The stamps have an intricate design incorporating the tughra and the bridge at Larissa and are of interest for their unusual octagonal shape and perforations which permit them to be separated into either squares or octagons. They are the first postage stamps ever issued octagonally perforated.

=== Early Twentieth Century ===
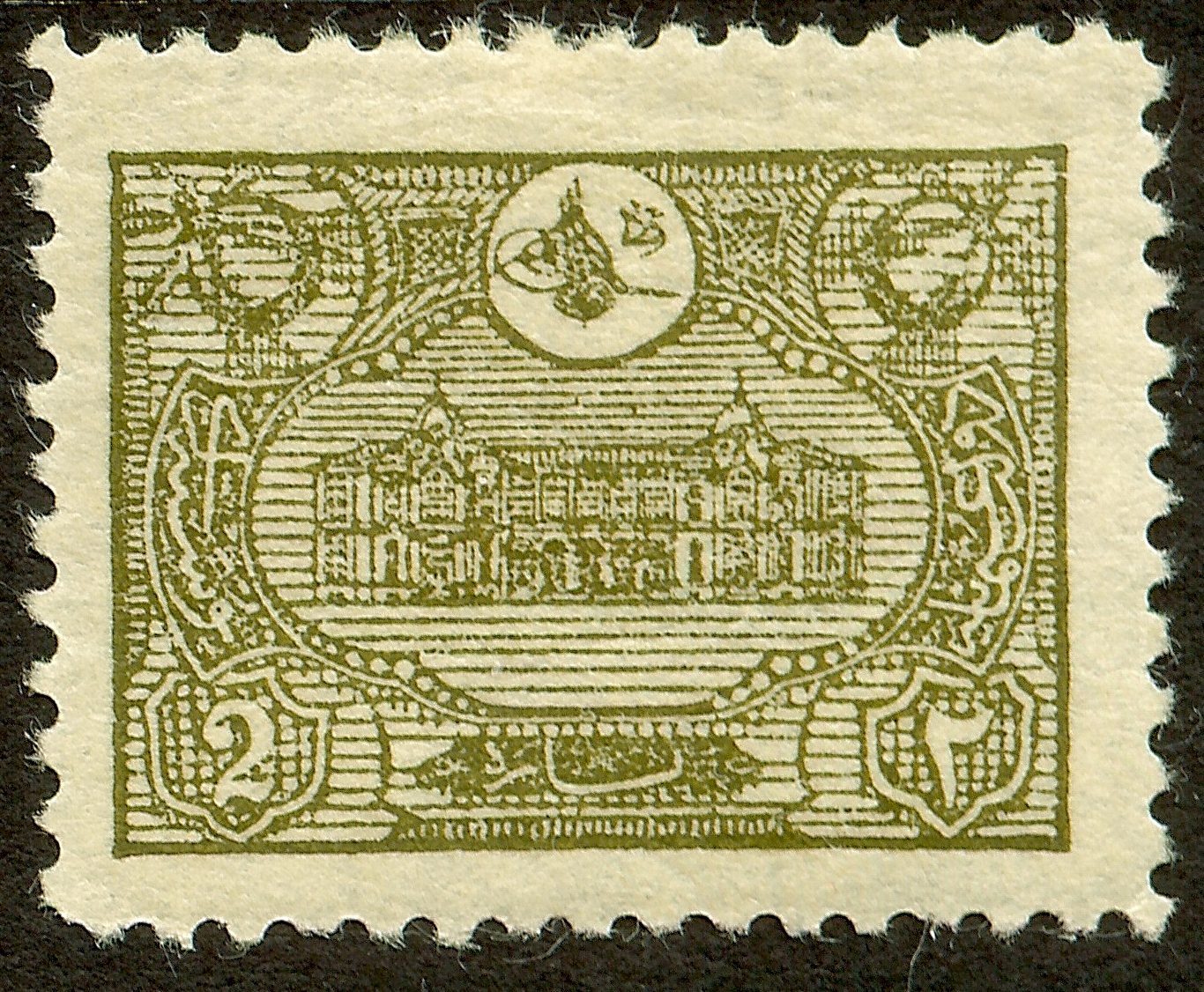
New General Post Office, Constantinople, c. 1913

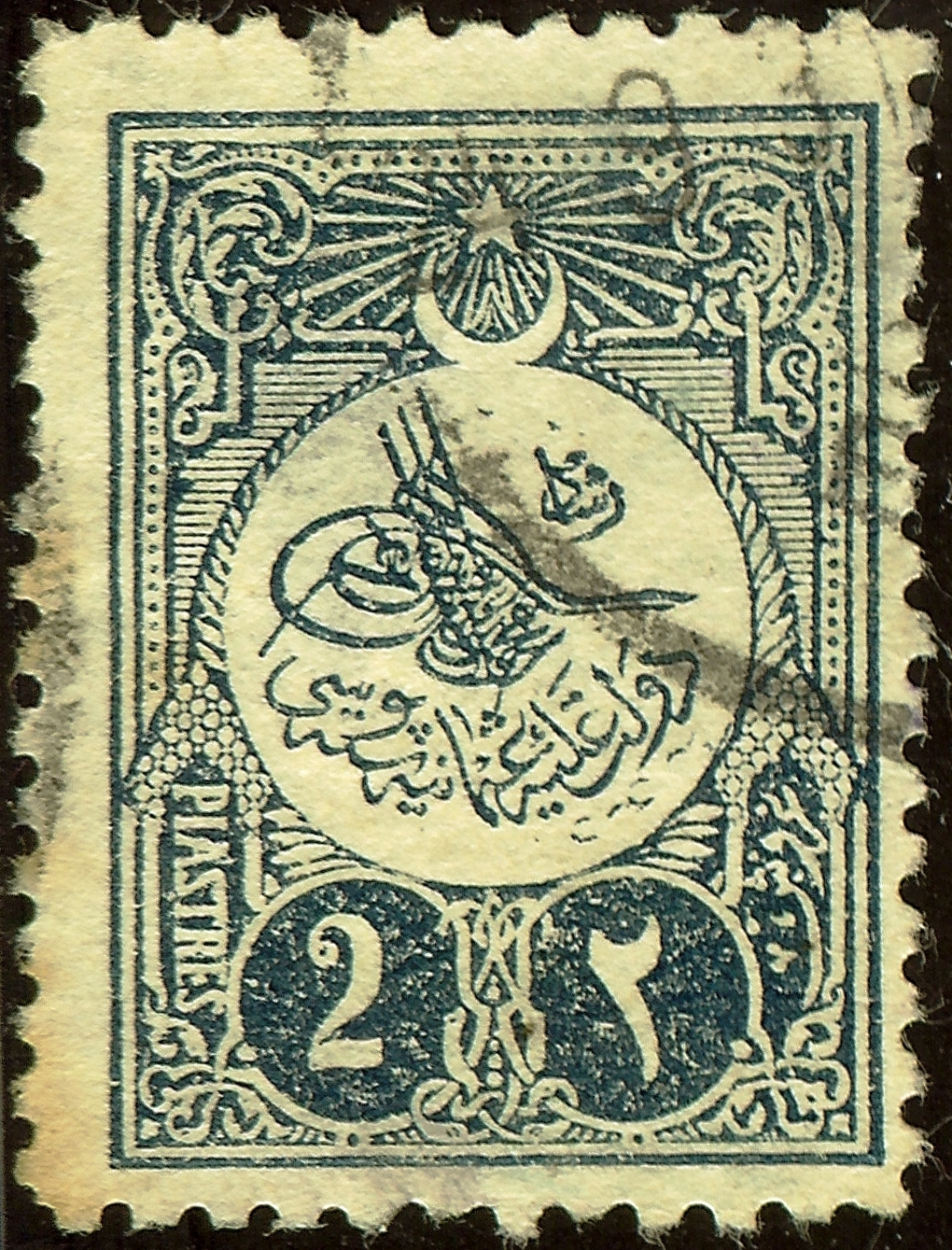
Typical early 20th century stamp

From 1901 through 1911, the Ottoman Empire issued a number of stamps with similar designs including the Tughra of the reigning monarch. All early Ottoman stamps were printed in the Ottoman Empire, with the exception of the first two Duloz issues printed in Paris (see above). All these stamps also had a distinct Turkish appearance until 1913, when a series of stamps was issued commemorating the recapture of Adrianople from the Bulgarians. These stamps were designed by Oskan Effendi and were engraved and printed in England by Bradbury, Wilkinson & Co., Ltd., and are in a more international style, with central vignettes surrounded by a frame. An example is illustrated in the lead to this article.

In early 1914, a series of finely engraved stamps, some in two colors, was issued depicting scenes of Constantinople and other images. They were designed by Oskan Effendi and printed by Bradbury, Wilkinson & Co. in England, and also have a more international appearance to them.

=== World War I and the End of the Ottoman Empire ===
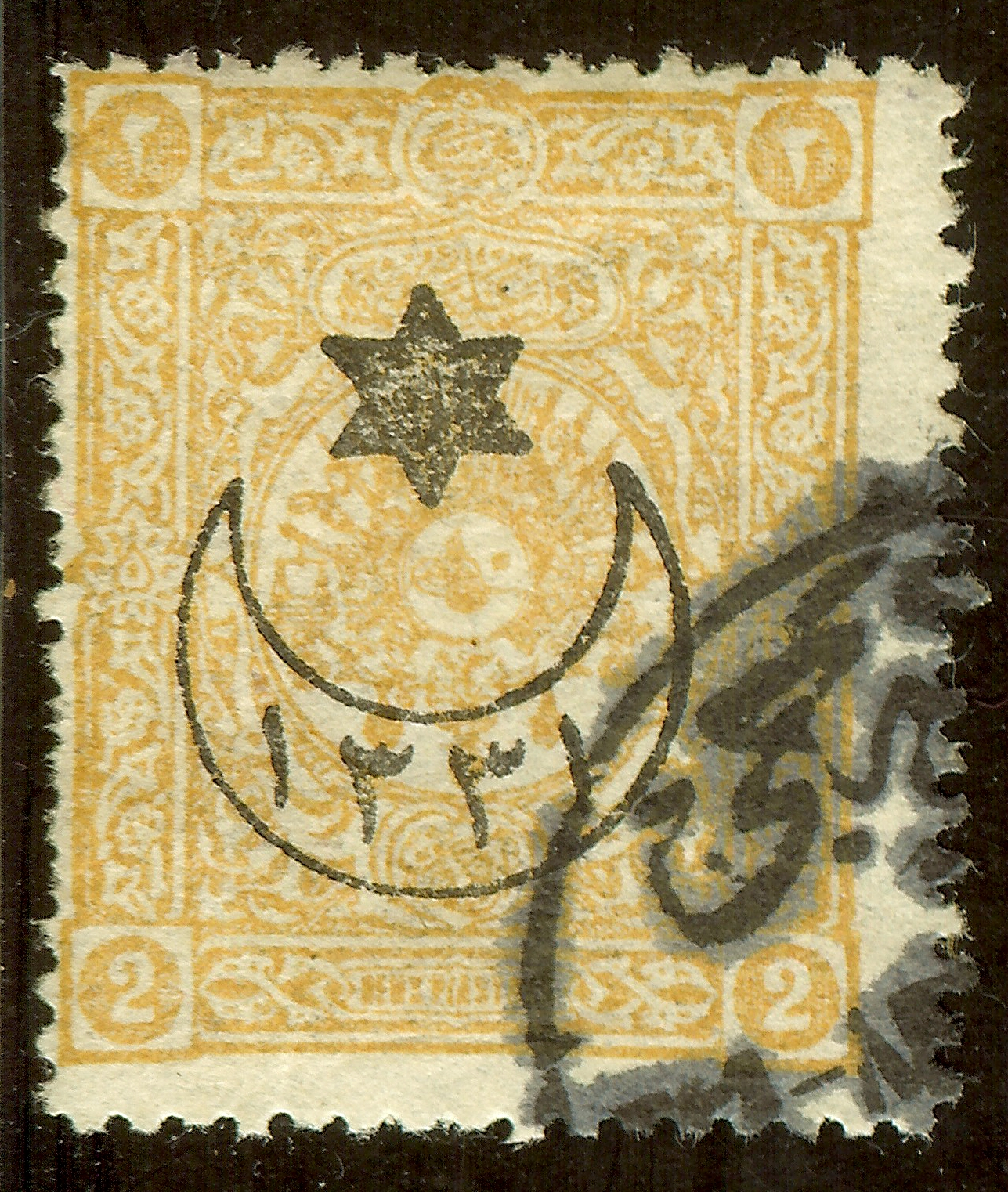
Provisional - 1915 overprint on 1892 stamp

The Ottoman Empire signed the secret Ottoman-German Alliance on August 2, 1914, and entered hostilities on the side of the Central Powers in October 1914. The war and its disruptions are reflected in the Ottoman stamps issued during the war, which included stamps depicting soldiers and battle scenes, a number of provisional stamp issues in which available stocks of older issues were overprinted due to paper shortages, and stamps issued to collect a tax for war orphans. Remainders of stamps as old as 1865 were overprinted, some of which already had overprints, and sometimes multiple new overprints were added, resulting in a complex variety of configurations of interest to philatelists. The Allied Forces were victorious and occupied Constantinople, after which the Ottoman government collapsed. The Treaty of Sèvres, August 10, 1920, confirmed the dismemberment of the Ottoman Empire.

== Government of the Grand National Assembly ==
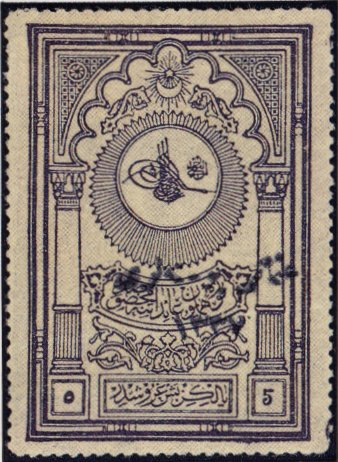
Anatolia old revenue, handstamped 1921

Following the armistice, Mustafa Kemal Atatürk formed a Government in Ankara and the Turkish War of Independence against the Allies ensued. Outside of a small area surrounding Constantinople, Turkey was controlled by the Ankara Government and is referred to philatelically as "Turkey in Asia" or "Anatolia". This eventually led to the Treaty of Lausanne, July 24, 1923, which supplanted the Treaty of Sèvres. From 1920 to 1922, small stocks of old postage stamps were overprinted after which a number of large revenue stamps with intricate designs and without Western lettering were handstamped for validation as postage. Passer has stated that the study of the stamps of this period "is very difficult, for there are no reliable official records of the actual dates of their issue, or of the length of time for which they were used, and but few genuine letters with clear dates are available."

== The Republic of Turkey ==
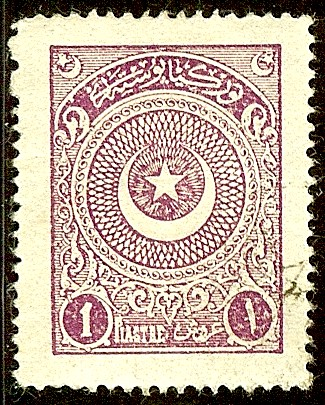
First issue of the republic, 1923

On 1 November 1922, the National Assembly, led by Mustafa Kemal, abolished the Sultanate and the last Sultan, Mehmed VI abdicated and fled the country. Turkey was declared a republic on 28 October 1923. The republic's first stamp issue was a definitive series depicting a star and crescent, somewhat reminiscent of the Duloz issue. This issue marked the end of the use of the Tughra which had appeared as a design element in most of Turkey's stamps from 1863 to 1922.

The first republic issue was followed by an issue commemorating the Treaty of Peace at Lausanne, and other issues depicting national scenes and Mustafa Kemal. From the late 1920s up to 1940, Turkey overprinted a number of stamps to commemorate events such as exhibitions or the opening of a railroad.

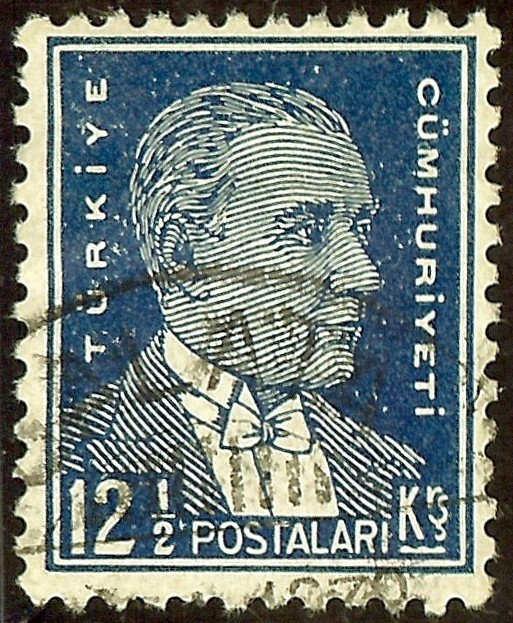
Mustafa Kemal on 1932 stamp with more contemporary design

In 1931, Turkey began a new stamp issue in a more contemporary style depicting Mustafa Kemal. Mustafa Kemal would continue to be a common subject of Turkey's stamps thereafter. In the following decades, Turkey's stamp production became more varied, producing colorful stamps with a great diversity of images including scenes of the country, archeological sites, famous Turks, native flora and fauna, and folk costumes, to name just a few.

Up to 1937, all of Turkey's stamps had been printed by either engraving or typography. In 1937, Turkey issued its first stamp printed by lithography and in 1938 it printed a stamp issue by photogravure, which thereafter became the standard methods for printing its stamps.

== Miscellaneous stamps ==
Over the years, Turkey issued a number of stamps for specialized purposes.

In 1863, the Ottoman Empire issued a set of postage due stamps, being among the first countries in the world to issue stamps for that specific purpose. The postage dues through 1913 had the same designs as the regular stamps, such as the Duloz or Empire issues, but were typically distinguished by being printed in brown or black. In 1914, the Ottoman Empire issued its first postage dues with their own designs.

Turkey issued a number of official stamps for governmental use. From 1948 to 1957, it produced such stamps by overprinting regular postage stamps with the word "Resmî", meaning "Official". A number of varieties of the overprints exist. Beginning in 1957, Turkey issued official stamps specifically designed for that purpose, commonly with the value in the center surrounded by ornate designs.

From 1928 through 1958, Turkey issued a number of postal tax stamps to collect funds for certain charities such as the so-called Red Crescent counterpart to the Red Cross.

== Local stamps ==
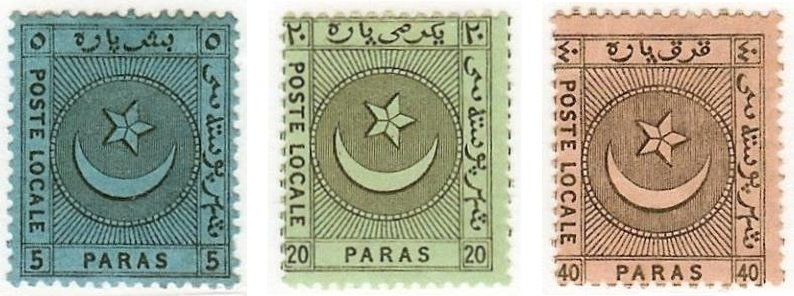
Local stamps of the 1865 Liannos et Cie post in Constantinople

In 1865 the local post distribution company Liannos et Cie was established in Constantinople to distribute mail arriving in the city which was not addressed in Arabic as the staff of the Ottoman Postal Service were unable to read the Latin alphabet. The stamps were printed by Perkins Bacon from plates that are now held in the museum of the Royal Philatelic Society London. In 1866 a second service was set up on behalf of the Egyptian post office operating in the city to solve the same problem. Both services were short lived.

== Postal stationery ==
Postal stationery envelopes were first issued in 1869 and continue to be available to date. Postcards were first issued in 1877 and since then over one hundred different postcards have been produced. Lettercards were first issued in 1895 and the last issue was in 1914. Four newspaper wrappers were issued in 1901, followed by two new values in 1902 and a further two new values with a new design in 1914. One registration envelope was issued in 1914 and when the stocks were exhausted no further issues were made till 1993 when 4 values were made available. Aerogrammes were first issued in 1963, when three values were made available.

== Postal cancellations ==
The postal cancellations, applied to Turkey's stamps to prevent re-use, carried the name, in Turkish—written in Arabic script—and sometimes also in the Latin alphabet, of the localities where posted. These cancellations have received extensive study by philatelists, who have cataloged several thousand used in the Ottoman Empire. The cancellations include "negative seals", typically a circular stamp in which the Arabic lettering appears uninked against a black background.

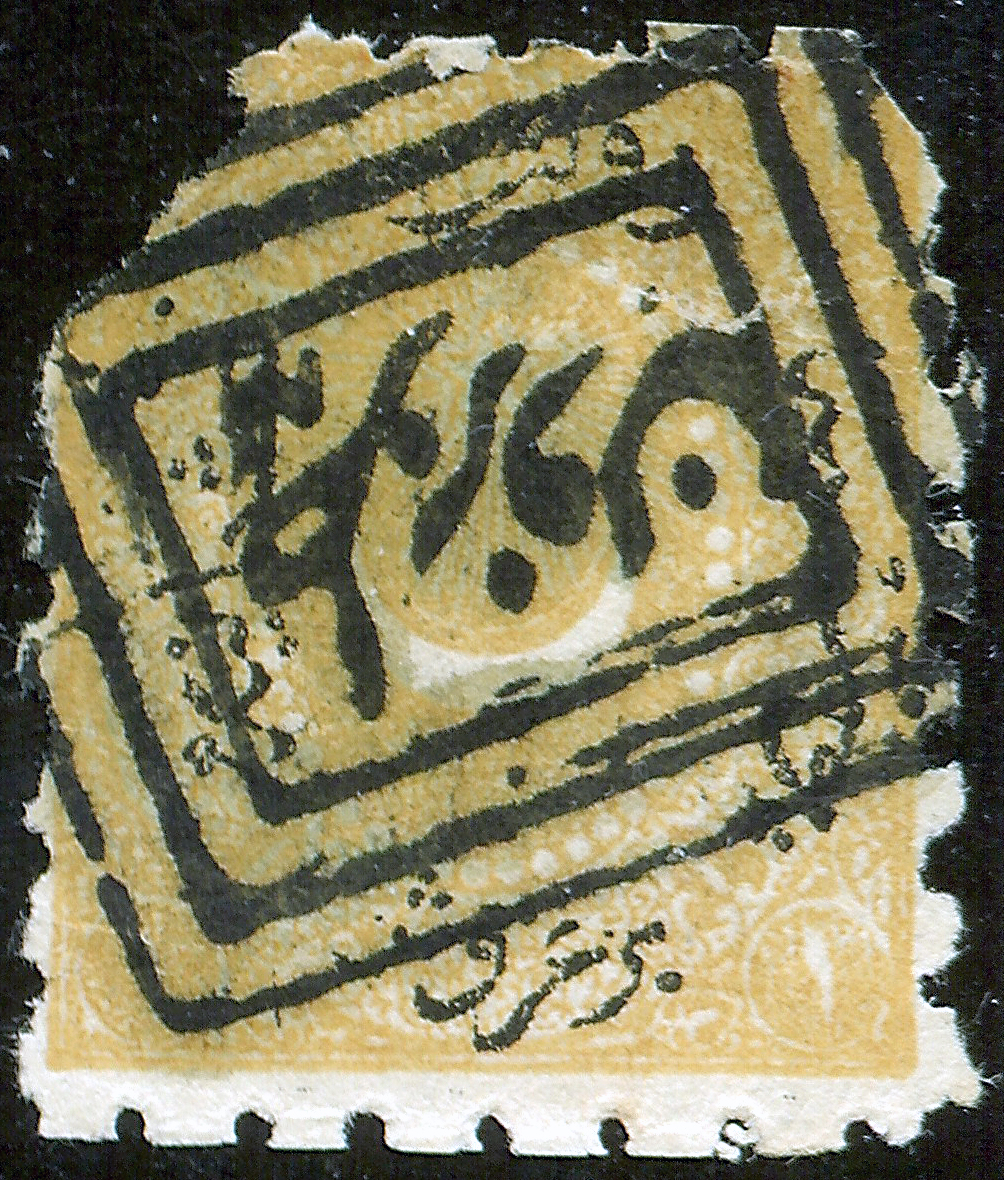
1870–71 Duloz cancelled in Trebizonde

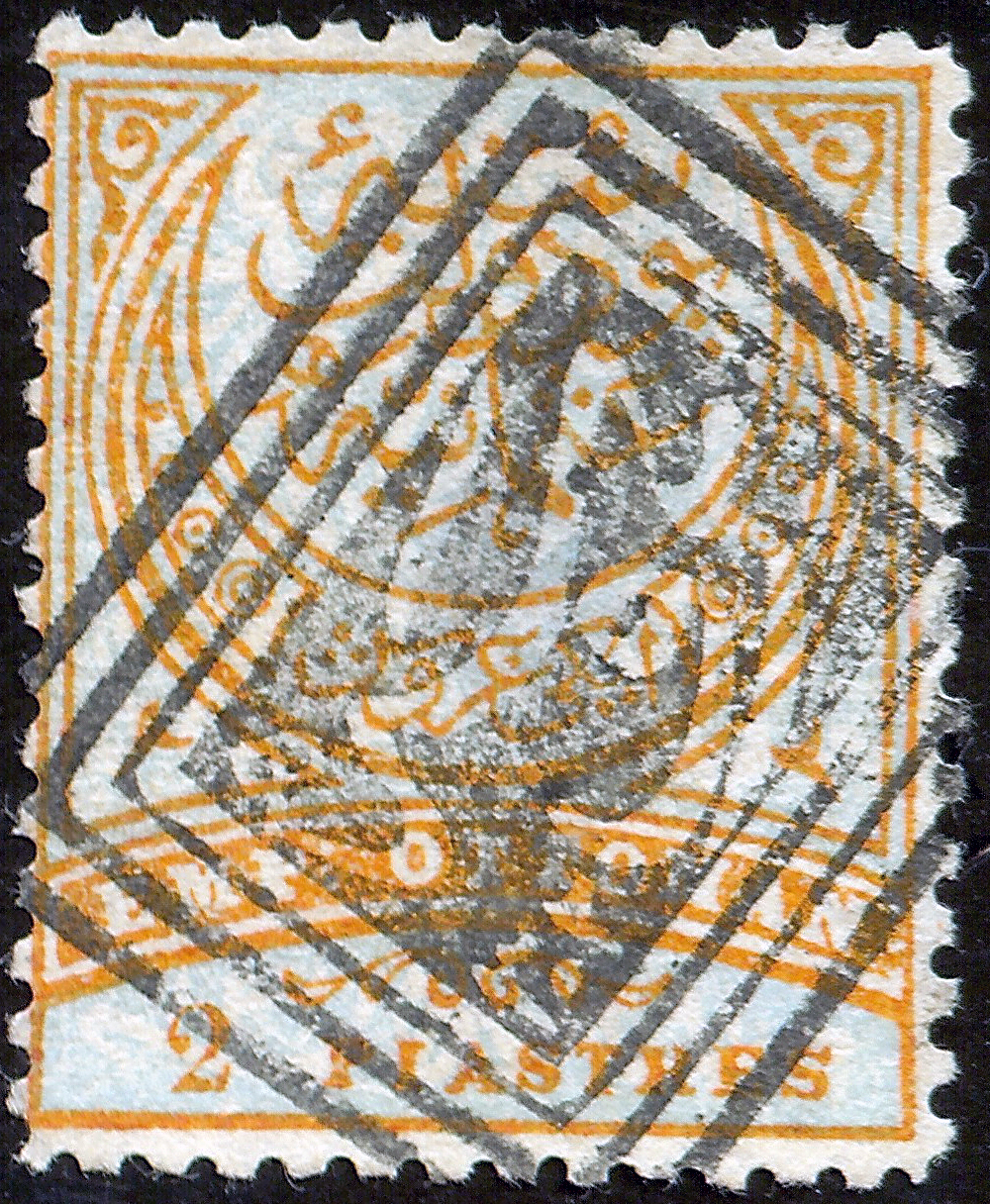
1886 Empire cancelled in Bursa, negative seal within box

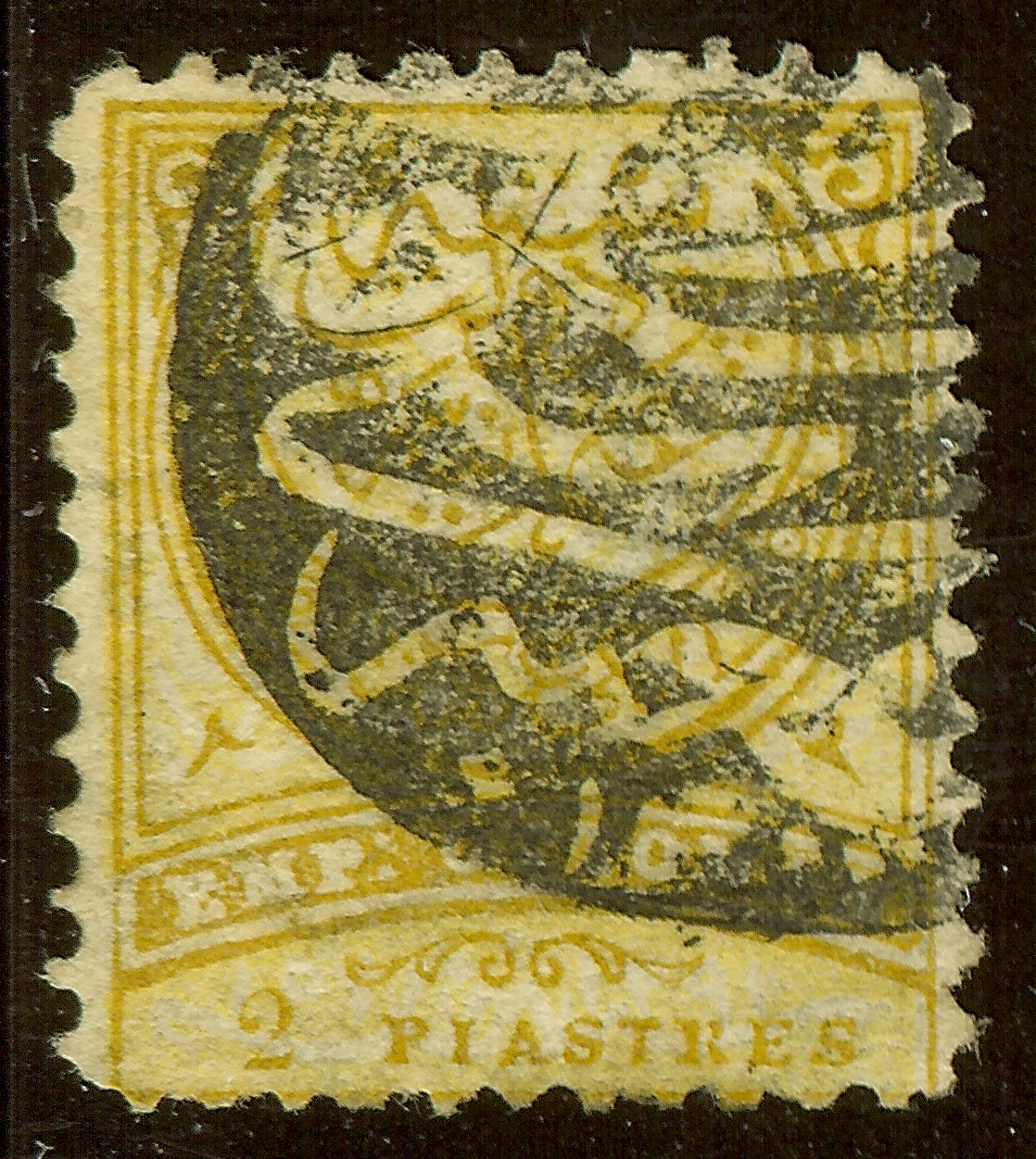
1890 Empire with unidentified negative seal cancellation

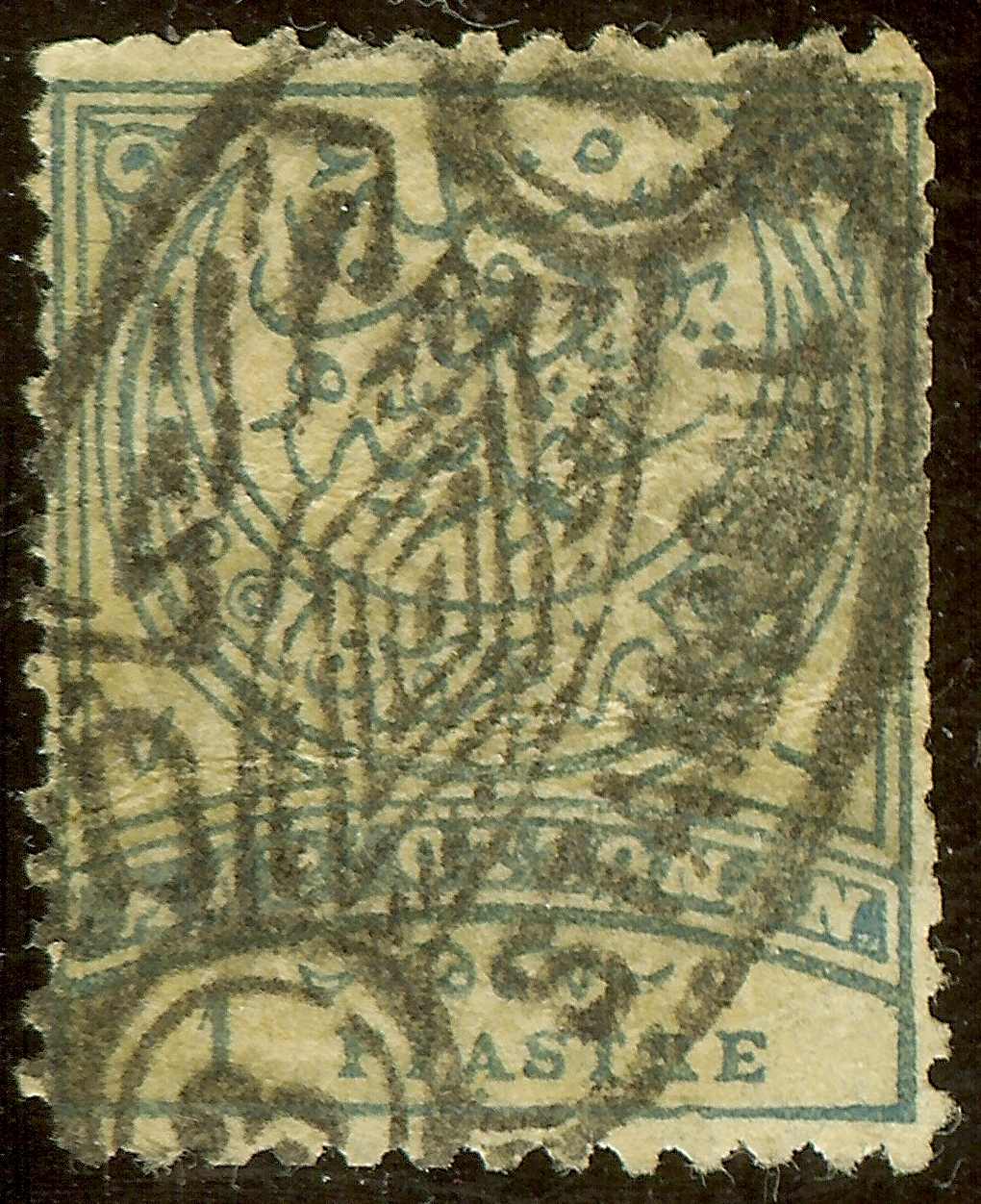
1890 Empire with Stamboul cancellation

== Philatelic forgeries ==
Stamps of Turkey, especially the nineteenth-century issues, have been extensively forged for the philatelic market, including both rare and common issues. As Fernand Serrane, one of the great experts in stamp forgeries, warned, "Forged overprints pullulate; all the more reason why one should avoid involvement". A number of philatelists have published studies of the forgeries of Turkey.

== Gallery ==
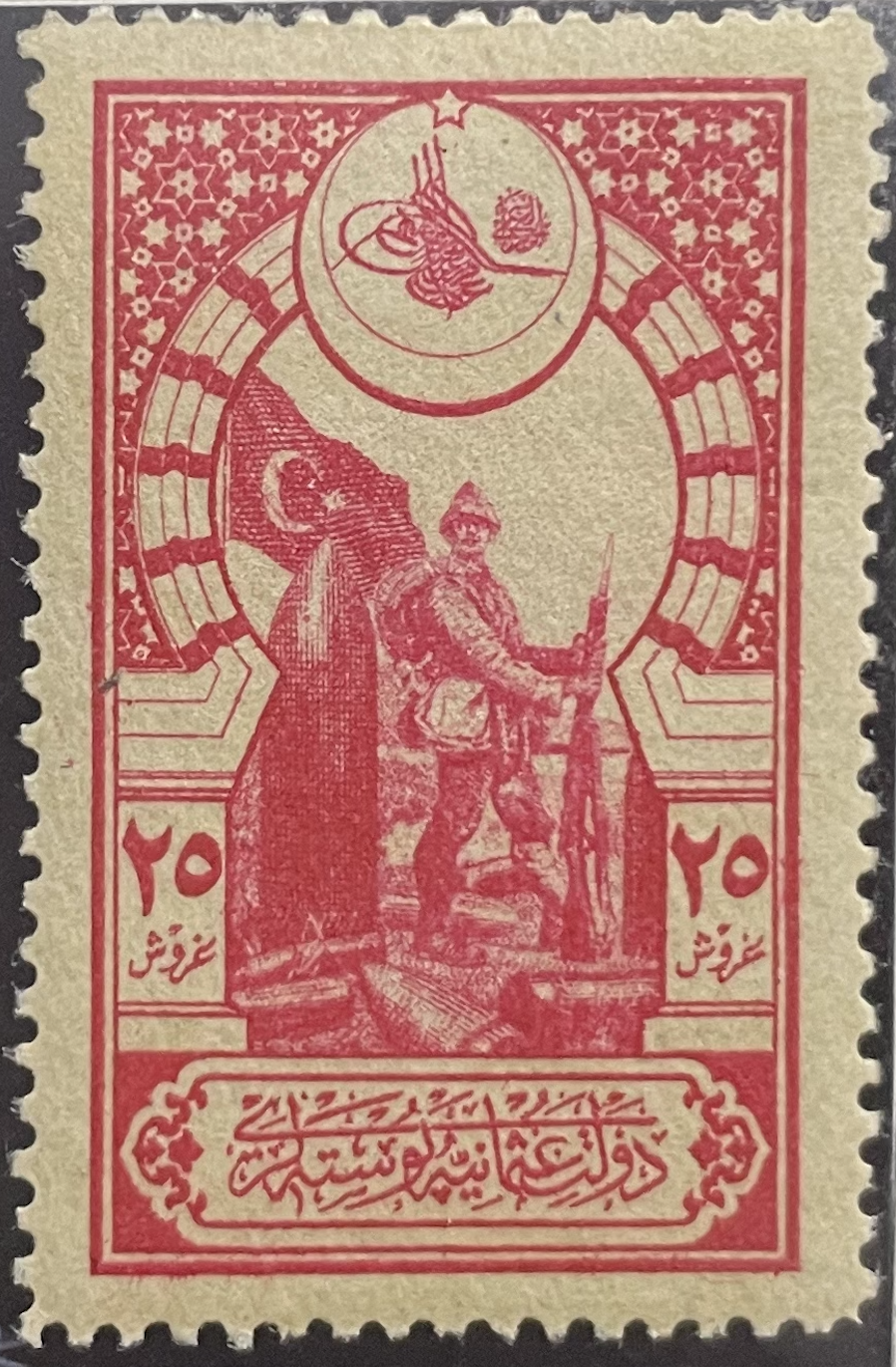
25 gurush stamp with a soldier, 1917

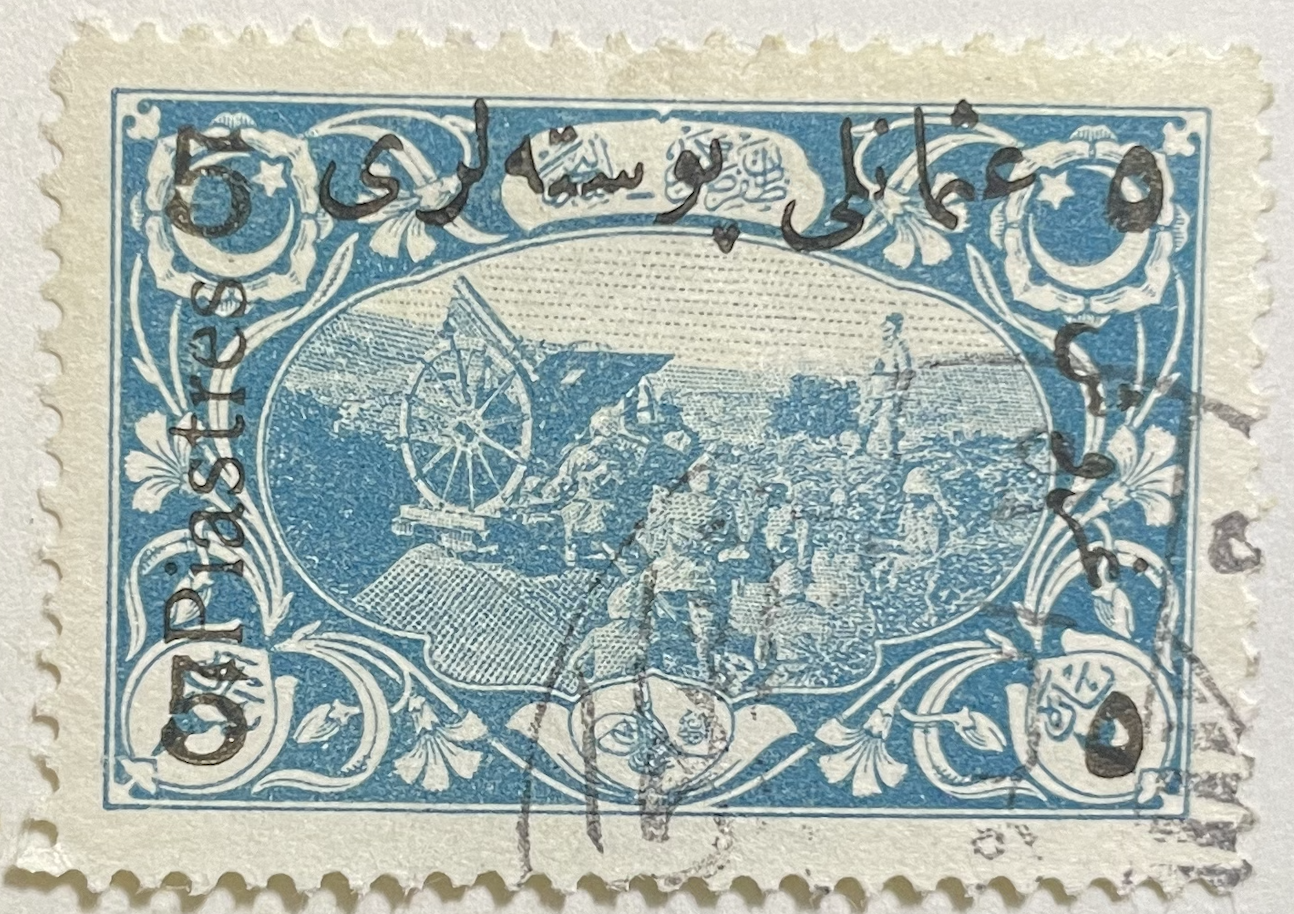
The stamp was surcharged with 5 gurush, 1918

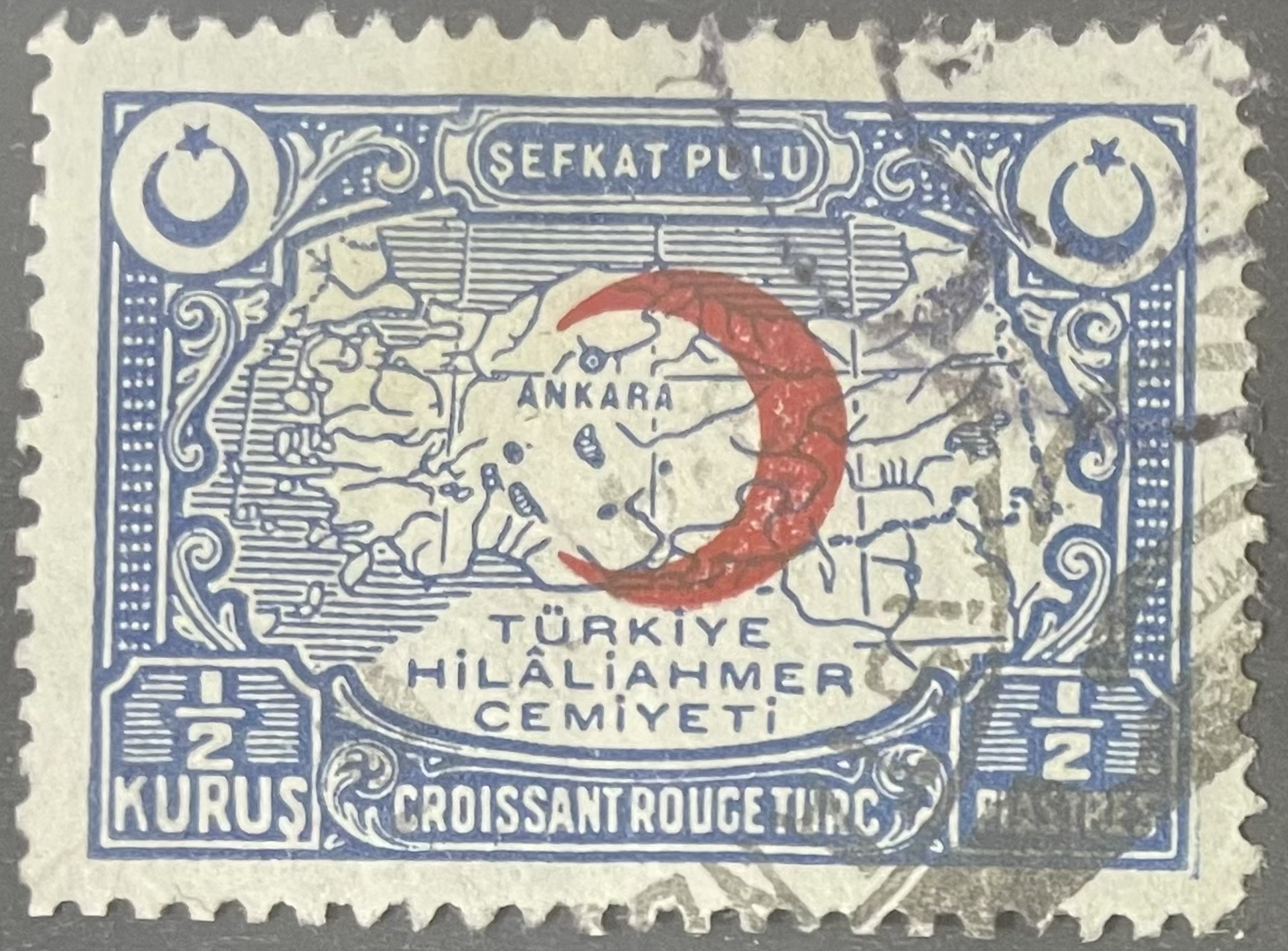
Red Crescent charity stamp, 1934

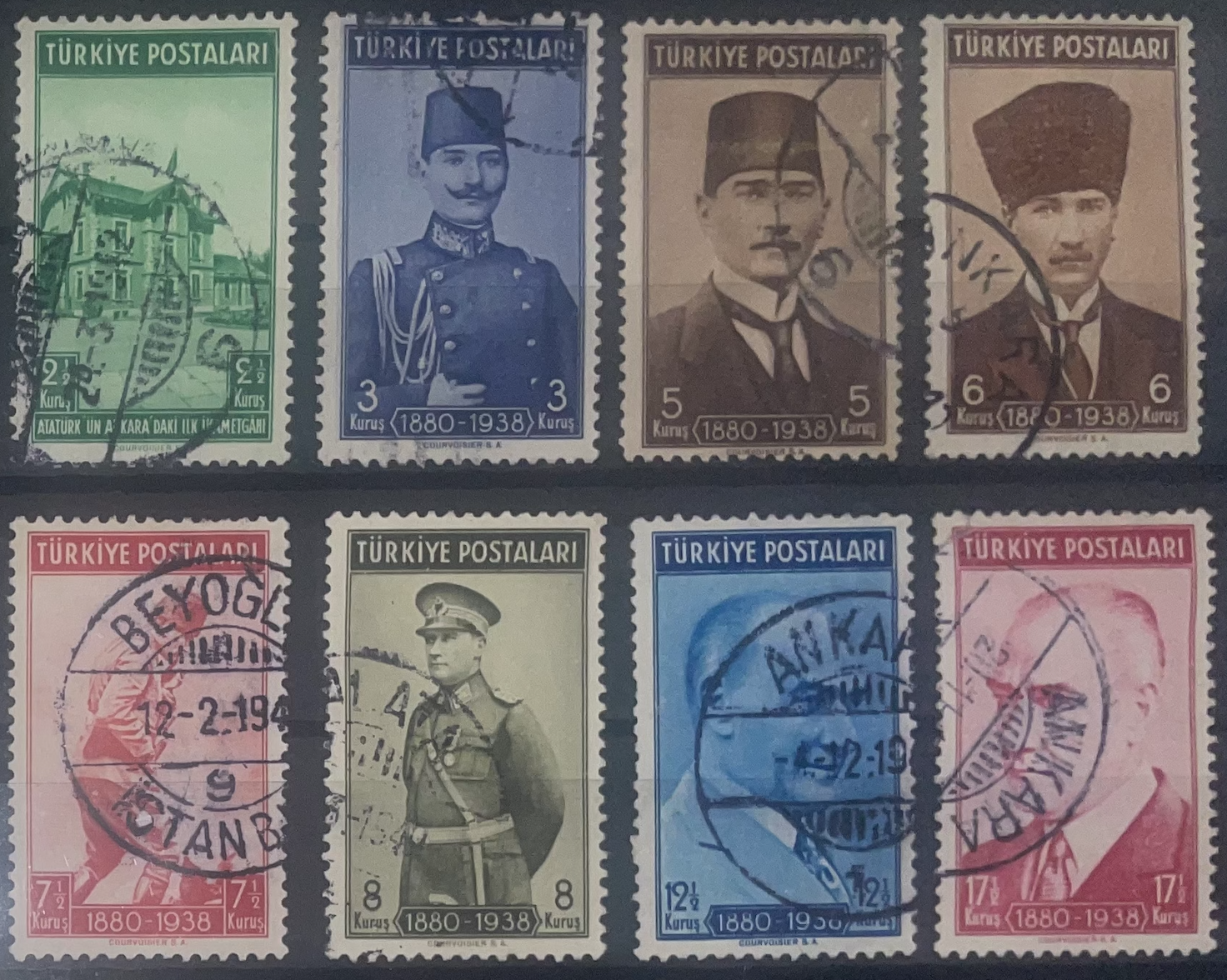
The stamp series for the commemorate the first anniversary of the death of Atatürk, 1939-40

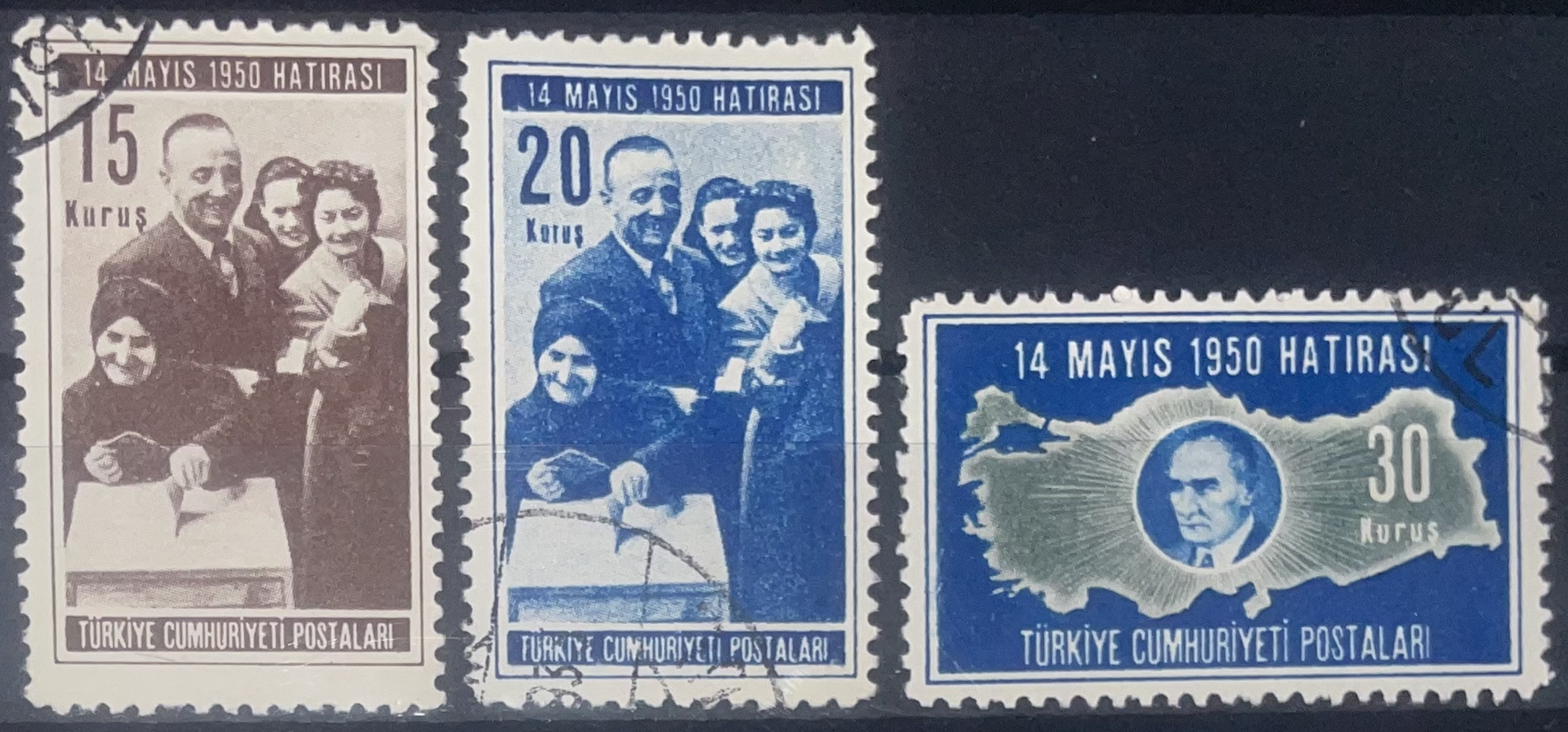
The series of stamps for the 1950 Turkish general election, 1950

== See also ==
- PTT (Turkey)

The Ottoman Empire

- Postage stamps and postal history of Hatay
- Postage stamps and postal history of Iraq
- Postage stamps and postal history of Palestine
- List of Ottoman post offices in Palestine
- List of Ottoman postal rates in Palestine

Foreign post offices in Turkey

- Capitulations of the Ottoman Empire
- Austrian post offices in the Ottoman Empire
- French post offices in the Ottoman Empire
- German post offices in the Ottoman Empire
- Russian post offices in the Ottoman Empire

== References and sources ==
Notes

Sources

- John H. Coles & Howard E. Walker ([1984]-1995), Postal Cancellations of the Ottoman Empire, Christie’s-Robson Lowe, London four parts, each a separate volume, identifying cancellations used on stamps throughout the empire, up its end in 1923. Part 1, Europe, is undated but was published in 1984. Part 2, The Lost Territories in Africa & Asia, ISBN 0-85397-426-8, is undated. Part 3, Turkey-in-Europe,ISBN 0 85397 432 2, is undated. Part 4, Turkey-in-Asia,ISBN 0 85397 443 8, is dated 1995. An undated Addendum, Corrigendum and Index was issued for Part 1.
- Adolf Passer (1938), The Stamps of Turkey, Royal Philatelic Society, London. The major study of the stamps up to 1934, with details on postal history, production methods, local issues, proofs, etc.
