= Oriental Philatelic Association of London =

Philatelic society specializing in stamps of the Near East and Eastern Mediterranean

- Abbreviation: OPAL
- Formation: 1949
- Founded at: London
- Main organ: OPAL, The OPAL Journal

The Oriental Philatelic Association of London, or OPAL, is a philatelic society whose members specialise in the philately of the area covered by the former Ottoman Empire and the states around the Eastern Mediterranean from Libya to the former Yugoslavia.

== History ==
The society was formed on 8 November 1949 at a meeting in the premises of auction house Harmers in London. There were 25 founding members who mainly collected Egypt and Sudan but the membership soon expanded and the association came to focus mainly on the Ottoman Empire and surrounding areas.

In the late 1970s, membership fell to less than 100 but the association was reinvigorated following a meeting at the London 1980 International Stamp Exhibition after which a new committee was appointed and a new constitution adopted.

In 1999, the association's members gave a display before the members of the Royal Philatelic Society London to mark their 50th anniversary at which time the membership stood at 275.

In 2000, with the Holyland Philatelic Society, the association published a history of the Ottoman field post offices in Palestine from 1914 to 1918 based on the collection of Alexander Koleksiyonu. The book was edited by Kemal Giray and Jeff Ertughrul with a parallel Turkish and English text. Its publication was supported by a grant from the Economic and Social History Foundation of Turkey.

Notable members include Mehmet Başaran, Kemal Giray, Rainer Fuchs, Otto Hornung and the late Jeff Ertughrul.

== Selected publications ==
- Kemal Giray & Jeff Ertughrul. (Eds.) (2000) The Ottoman Field Post Offices Palestine (1914-1918) The Alexander Collection. Published jointly with the Holyland Philatelic Society. ISBN 975730672X
