= List of post offices in Mandatory Palestine =

This is a lsit of post offices that were operated in Palestine under allied British military control of the Occupied Enemy Territory Administration and, after 1920, the civil administration of the British Mandate of Palestine. During the Mandate, postal services were provided by British authorities.

About 160 post offices, branch offices, rural agencies, travelling post offices, and town agencies operated, some only for a few months, others for the entire length of the period. Upon the advance of allied forces in 1917 and 1918 initially Field Post Offices and Army Post Offices served the local civilian population. Some of the latter offices were converted to Stationary Army Post Offices and became civilian post offices upon establishment of the civilian administration. In 1919 fifteen offices existed, rising to about 100 by 1939, and about 150 by the end of the Mandate in May 1948.

With most of the Jerusalem General Post Office archives destroyed, research depends heavily on philatelists recording distinct postmarks and dates of their use.

The postal service operated by the Mandatory authorities was reputed to be the best in the Middle East. Letters were delivered daily in Jerusalem. Palestine joined the Universal Postal Union in October 1923. The post was transported by boat, train, cars and horses, and after 1927, also by air. During the volatility of 1947 and 1948, British postal services deteriorated and were replaced by ad hoc interim services prior to the partition and the establishment of the State of Israel.

== Mandate post offices ==
Place name (alternatives) (Note: Name of the town or village, as postally used at the time, plus alternative spellings.)	Est. (Note: Official establishment of a postal facility: Post Office, Postal Agency, Branch Office, Town Agency, Travelling Post Office.)	Operating (Note: Dates of actual use of postmarks, as recorded by philatelists.)	References
Acre	(1919)	1919–1948	
Afikim	1945	1945–1948	
Afula (El Affule, Affula)	1920	1923–1948	
Alonim	1945	1945–1948	
Ashdot Yaaqov (Ashdot Ya'akov)	1945	1945–1948	
Athlith (Athlit)	1922	1922–1948	
El Bassa (Al-Bassa, Elbasse)	1944	1944–1948	
Bat Yam	1938	1938–1948	
Beersheba	(1919)	1919–1948	
Beer Tuviya (Beertuviya, Beertuvyia, Ber Tuviya)	1938	1938–1948	
Beisan (Beit She'an)	1920	1921–1948	
Beit Hakerem (Beth Hakerem)	1926	1927–1948	
Beit HaShita (Beyt Hashitta)	1944	1944–1948	
Beit Jala	1929	1929–1948	
Bayt Jibrin	1947	1947–1948	
Beit Vegan (Bait Vegan)	1936	1936–1938	
Benay Beraq (Bnei Brak, Benei Beraq, Benei Beraq, Beneiberaq)	1929	1929–1948	
Ben Shemen	1944	1944–1948	
Ber Yacob (Be'er Ya'akov)	1922	1922–1926	
Bethlehem		1919–1948	
Binyamina (Binyamina-Giv'at Ada, Benjamina, Benyamina)	1923	1927–1948	
Birzeit (Bir Zeit, Bir ez Zait)	1925	1944–1948	
Kalia, Dead Sea (Kalya)	1941	1941–1947	
Ein Harod (Ain Harod, Meshek Ein Harod)	1923	1927–1948	
Ein HaShofet	1944	1944–1948	
Ein Karim (Ein Karem)	1945	1945–1948	
Even Yehuda	1944	1944–1948	
Faluja (Al-Faluja)	1943	1943–1948	
Gaza	1919	1919–1948	
Gedera	1936	1936–1948	
Gevat (Gvat)	1944	1944–1948	
Giva'tayim (Givatayim)	1946	1946–1948	
Givat Brenner (Gevaat Brenner)	1936	1936–1948	
Givat Haiyim (Givat Haim)	1944	1944–1948	
Hadera (Khudeira, Hedera)		1921–1948	
Haifa (Field Post Office)		1918–1919	
Haifa (Indian Field Post Office)		1919–1920	
Haifa		1918–1948	
Haifa, Ahuzat Samuel	1935	1935–1948	
Haifa, Bat Galim	1939	1939–1948	
Haifa, Bazaar	1929	1929–1938	
Haifa, Carmel Avenue	1924	1924–1926	
Haifa, Hadar Hacarmel	1926	1926–1948	
Haifa, Hertseliya Street	1945	1945–1948	
Haifa, Hidjaz	1941	1941–1948	
Haifa, Mount Carmel	1928	1928–1948	
Haifa, Nahla	1938	1938–1948	
Haifa, Nazareth Street	1938	1938–1941	
Hebron	1919	1919–1948	
Heftsibah Beit Alfa	1935	1935–1948	
Herzliya (Herzelia, Herzlia, Hertsliya, Hertseliya)	1926	1926–1948	
Holon (Holon)	1943	1943–1948	
Isdud (Isdud)	1947	1947–1948	
Jaffa (Field Post Office)		1918–1918	
Jaffa		1918–1948	
Jaffa, Ajami Street (Ajami)	1921	1921–1931	
Jaffa, Tel Aviv (Tel Aviv Jaffa, Tel-Aviv-Jaffa)	1920	1920–1948	
Jenin (Jenin)	1920	1920–1948	
Jericho (Jericho)	1921	1921–1948	
Jerusalem (Field Post Office)	1917	1917–1919	
Jerusalem		1918–1948	
Jerusalem, Citadel	1929	1929–1948	
Jerusalem, German Colony	1928	1928–1928	
Jerusalem, Greek Colony	1929	1929–1948	
Jerusalem, Mahne Yehuda (Mahane Yehuda)	1934	1934–1948	
Jerusalem, Meo Sheorim (Mea Shearim)	1920	1920–1948	
Jerusalem, Rehavia	1936	1936–1948	
Jerusalem, Talavera Barracks	1936	1936–1936	
Karkur (Kerkur)	1928	1928–1948	
Kefar Barouch (Kfar Baruch, Kfar Barukh)	1944	1944–1948	
Kefar Behadraga	1944	1944–1948	
Kefar Hassidim	1944	1944–1948	
Kefar Sava	1929	1929–1948	
Kefar Shemaryahu	1944	1944–1948	
Kefar Sirkin	1944	1945–1948	
Kefar Tabor (Kfar Tavor)	1944	1944–1948	
Kefar Vitkin	1936	1936–1948	
Kefar Yedidya	1944	1944–1948	
Kefar Yehezkel	1938	1940–1948	
Kefar Yehoshua	1925	1944–1948	
Kefar Yona	1944	1944–1948	
Kfar Ata (Kefar Ata)	1942	1942–1948	
Khan Yunis (Khan Yunus)	1922	1926–1948	
Kinneret (Kinereth)	1934	1934–1948	
Lydda (Ludd Village)	1921	1921–1948	
Lydda Airport (Ben Gurion International Airport)	1937	1937–1948	
Lydda Junction (Ludd, Ludd Junction, Lydda)	(1919)	1919–1934	
Maaborot (Maabarot)	1944	1944–1948	
Magdiel	1926	1926–1939	
El Majdal (Majdel, Majdal, Mijdel, Mejdel)	1920	1920–1948	
Maoz Haim (Maoz Haiyim)	1944	1944–1948	
El Masmiya al Kabira (Masmiya al Kabira)	1945	1945–1948	
Meir Shefeya	1945	1945–1948	
Merhavya	1944	1944–1948	
Meshek Ayelet Hashshahar (Meshek Ayelet Hashahar)	1944	1944–1948	
Meshek Yajur	1944	1944–1948	
Metulla (Metula, Metullah)	1924	1925–1948	
Migdal	1944	1944–1948	
Mishmar HaEmek	1945	1945–1948	
Mizra	1945	1945–1948	
Na'an (Naan, Na an)	1944	1944–1948	
Nablus	(1919)	1919–1948	
Nahalal	1923	1923–1948	
Nahalat Yehuda (Rishon LeZion, Nachlat Yehouda)	1936	1936–1948	
Nahariya	1938	1938–1948	
Netanya	1933	1933–1948	
Nazareth	1919	1919–1948	
Nes Ziyona (Ness Ziona, Nes Tsiyona)	1925	1927–1948	
Nuseirat	1944	1944–1945	
Pardess Hanna	1933	1933–1948	
Petah Tikqva (Petach Tikvah, Petah Tikvah, Pethah Tiqva, Petahtiqva)	1920	1920–1948	
Qalqilya (Qalqilye)	1929	1929–1948	
Qiryat Amal	1947	1947–1948	
Qiryat Anavim	1944	1944–1948	
Qiryat Haim (Kiryat Haim)	1935	1935–1948	
Qiryat Motzkin (Kiryat Motzkin)	1947	1947–1948	
Ra'anana	1931	1931–1948	
Rafa	1920	1920–1921	
Er Rama (Rameh, Errama)	1944	1944–1948	
Ramallah (Ram Allah)	(1919)	1919–1948	
Ramataim (Ramatayim)	1935	1935–1948	
Ramat Gan	1926	1927–1948	
Ramat HaKovesh	1945	1945–1948	
Ramat HaSharon	1935	1935–1948	
Ramleh (Ramla, Er Ramle)	(1919)	1919–1948	
Rehovot (Rehoboth, Rehovoth)	1920	1921–1948	
Rishon LeZion (Richon Le Zion, Richon-Le-Zion, Rishon, Rishon Le Ziyon, Rishon Le Tsiyon)	1921	1921–1948	
Rosh Pinna (Roch Pina, Rosh Pinah)	1921	1921–1948	
Safed (Safad)	(1918)	1918–1948	
Salfit	1945	1945–1948	
Sarafand (Surafend)	1922	1922–1948	
Sarona	1928	1928–1939	
Sdeh Nahum	1944	1944–1948	
Sde Yaaqov	1944	1944–1948	
Semakh (Samakh)	1921	1921–1948	
Shefa Amr	1925	1932–1948	
Shekhunat Borokhov (Givatayim)	1933	1933–1942	
Tarshiha (Ma'alot-Tarshiha)	1944	1944–1948	
Tel Aviv		1921–1948	
Tel Aviv, Allenby Road		1925–1948	
Tel Aviv, Dizengoff Street		1937–1948	
Tel Aviv, Herzl Street		1936–1948	
Tel Aviv, Shekhunat Montefiori		1937–1943	
Tel Aviv, Tel Nordau		1934–1948	
Tel Aviv, Yorkon (Yarkon)		1935–1937	
Tel Mond (Tel Mond)	1934	1934–1948	
Tiberias	1919	1919–1948	
Tirat Tsevi (Tirat Zvi, Tirat Tsevi)	1945	1945–1948	
Tul Karm (Tul Keram, Tulkeram, Tulkarem, Tulkarm)	1919	1919–1948	
Yajur Nesher	1934	1934–1948	
Yavneel, Yavne'el (Yavniel)	1924	1924–1948	
Yokneam	1944	1944–1948	
Zammarin	1920	1920–1920	
Zikhron Ya'akov (Zicron, Zicron Jacob, Zikhron Yaaqov)	(1921)	1921–1948	
Jaffa–Lod–Jerusalem TPO (PAL, LAP, PAJ, JAP, RAK, KAR, KAL, LAK, DAL, LAD, BAR, RAB)		1918–1919	
Jaffa–Lod–Jerusalem TPO (Jerusalem Ludd, Jerusalem Jaffa)		1920–1934	
Jerusalem–Lydda TPO (Jerusalem Lydda, Jsm Lydda)		1935–1938	
Haifa–Kantara TPO (Kantara Haifa, Kantar Haifa)		1920–1931	
Haifa–Rafa TPO (Rafa Haifa, Haifa Rafa)		1931–1938	

== See also ==
- Postal rates in the British Mandate of Palestine
- Postage stamps and postal history of Palestine
- Postage stamps and postal history of Israel

== Sources ==
- Dorfman, David (1985). Palestine Mandate postmarks. Sarasota, Fla.: Tower Of David.
- Goldstein, Carlos and Emil S. Dickstein (1983). Haifa and Jaffa postmarks of the Palestine Mandate. Beachwood, Oh.: Society of Israel Philatelists.
- Firebrace, John A. (1991). British Empire campaigns and occupations in the Near East, 1914–1924: a postal history. London & Bournemouth: Christie's Robson Lowe. ISBN 978-0-85397-439-0.
- Groten, Arthur H. (1988). The postmarks of Mandate Tel Aviv. Beachwood, Oh.: Society of Israel Philatelists.
- Proud, Edward B. (2006). The postal history of Palestine and Transjordan. Heathfield. ISBN 978-1-872465-89-0. First edition (1985): The postal history of British Palestine 1918-1948.
- Sacher, Michael M. (1995). The postal markings of Mandate Palestine: 1917-1948. London: Royal Philatelic Society. ISBN 978-0-900631-30-6.
