= List of postal rates in Mandatory Palestine =

Postage rates in Palestine

The List of postal rates in the British Mandate of Palestine are the postal rates in effect in Palestine under military occupation British and allied forces and later civil administration of the British Mandate of Palestine between 1917 and 1948. During the Mandate, postal services were provided by British authorities.

After occupation by allied forces in 1917, basic postage was free for civilians. Registration fees and parcels had to be franked using British or Indian stamps. Once the EEF stamps printed in Cairo came on sale, mail to overseas destinations had to be paid for from 10 February 1918, and from 16 February 1918 also mail to the then occupied territories and Egypt.

The structure of postal rates followed broadly British practice and new services, like airmail and express delivery, were added over the years. From 1926 reduced rates applied for mail to Britain and Ireland, and from 1 March 1938 to 4 September 1939, Palestine was part of the All Up Empire airmail rates system.

== Postal rates ==
Date	Rate details and subsequent changes	
December, 1917	Inland letter	free
December, 1917	Foreign letter	free
December, 1917	Inland postcard	free
February 10, 1918	Foreign letter	10 m (20g)
February 10, 1918	Foreign postcard	10 m; (Bale lists: 5 m)
February 10, 1918	Inland printed matter	5 m per 50g
February 16, 1918	Inland letter	5 m (20g); 3 m per add. 20g
February 16, 1918	Inland postcard	5 m
February 16, 1918	Inland registration	10 m
February 16, 1918	Foreign registration	10 m
February 16, 1918	Inland advice of delivery	10 m
February 16, 1918	Foreign advice of delivery	10 m
February 16, 1918	Inland enquiry	10 m
February 16, 1918	Foreign enquiry	10 m
April 10, 1918	Foreign printed matter	5 m per 50g
July 16, 1918	Inland postcard	3 m
July 16, 1918	Foreign postcard	4 m
July 16, 1918	Foreign printed matter	2 m per 50g
October 1, 1919	Inland printed matter	1 m per 50g
October 1, 1919	Foreign printed matter	1 m per 50g
October 1, 1919	Inland newspapers	1 m
August 1, 1920	Foreign letter	10 m (20g); 6 m per add. 20g
September 1, 1920	Inland postcard	4 m
September 1, 1920	Inland printed matter	2 m per 50g
September 1, 1920	Foreign printed matter	2 m per 50g
September 1, 1920	Foreign commercial papers	2 m per 50g; minimum 250g
1921	Foreign newspapers	2 m per 50g; 2m per add. 50g
October 1, 1921	Foreign letter	13 m (20g); 9 m per add. 20g
October 1, 1921	Foreign postcard	6 m
October 1, 1921	Foreign printed matter	3 m per 50g
October 1, 1921	Foreign commercial papers	3 m per 50g
October 1, 1921	Inland registration	13 m
October 1, 1921	Foreign registration	13 m
October 1, 1921	Inland advice of delivery	10 m
October 1, 1921	Foreign advice of delivery	13 m
October 1, 1921	Inland enquiry	10 m
October 1, 1921	Foreign enquiry	13 m
October 1, 1921	Insurance (incl. mand. reg.)	20 m for value up to £10; 10 m per add. value of £10, maximum £40
January 1, 1923	Foreign letter	13 m (20g); 7 m per add. 20g
January 1, 1923	Foreign postcard	8 m
December 16, 1925	Foreign postcard	7 m
December 16, 1925	Blind literature	2 m per 1 kg
1926	Inland Express	20 m for distances up to 1 km, 30 m for 2 km, over 2 km up to delivery boundary 40 m; only available in Jerusalem, Jaffa, Haifa, and Tel-Aviv
1926	Insurance (incl. mand. reg.)	20 m for value up to £12; 7 m per add. value of £12
1926	Insured box	8 m (50g); minimum 40 m
January 1, 1926	Inland newspapers	2 m
February 15, 1926	UK & Éire letter	7 m (20g); 4 m per add. 20g
December 1, 1928	Foreign commercial papers	3 m per 50g; minimum 100g
December 1, 1928	Samples	6 m per 100g; 3 m per add. 50g
March 1, 1929	UK & Éire letter	13 m (20g); 7 m per add. 20g
April 1, 1930	UK & Éire letter	7 m (20g); 4 m per add. 20g
June 19, 1930	Small packet	7 m (50g); 7 per add 50g, minimum 25 m
June 1, 1932	Foreign letter	15 m (20g); 9 m per add. 20g
June 1, 1932	UK & Éire letter	8 m (20g); 5 m per add. 20g
June 1, 1932	Foreign postcard	8 m
June 1, 1932	Foreign commercial papers	3 m per 50g; minimum 250g
June 1, 1932	Small packet	9 m (50g); 9 per add 50g, minimum 300g
June 1, 1932	Inland enquiry	13 m
June 1, 1932	Late posting for ordinary packet	2 m
June 1, 1932	Late posting of registered packet	20 m
June 1, 1932	COD trade charge	10 m per £1
June 1, 1932	COD delivery fee	15 m
June 1, 1932	COD posting fee	10 m
1933	Inland advice of delivery	13 m
January 1, 1937	Inland Express	25 m (distance specs. unknown); only available in Jerusalem, Jaffa, Haifa, and Tel-Aviv
1938	Foreign newspapers	6 m
March 1, 1938	UK & Éire letter	10 m (10g); 10 m per add. 10g ("all up" Empire rate)
March 1, 1938	UK & Éire postcard	5 m; ("all up" Empire rate)
April 1, 1938	UK & Éire letter	10 m (10g); 10 m per add. 10g up to 70 g, 70 m for 71 up to 90g, 80 m for 91 up to 110g, over 110g: 80 m plus 10 m per any add. 20g ("all up" Empire rate)
September 4, 1939	UK & Éire letter	10 m (20g); 6 m per add. 20g
September 4, 1939	UK & Éire postcard	8 m
1940	Inland commercial papers	3 m per 50g; minimum 250g
May 1, 1940	Inland letter	7 m (20g); 5 m per add. 20g
July 1, 1940	Foreign letter	15 m (20g); 10 m per add. 20g
July 1, 1940	Foreign postcard	10 m
July 1, 1940	Inland registration	15 m
July 1, 1940	Foreign registration	15 m
July 1, 1940	Inland advice of delivery	15 m
July 1, 1940	Foreign advice of delivery	15 m
July 1, 1940	Inland enquiry	15 m
July 1, 1940	Foreign enquiry	15 m
July 1, 1940	Insurance (incl. mand. reg.)	25 m for value up to £12; 10 m per add. value of £12
July 1, 1940	Insured box	16 m (50g); minimum 65 m
April 1, 1941	Inland letter	10 m (30g); 6 m per add. 30g
April 1, 1941	Inland postcard	7 m
July 1, 1943	Foreign letter	20 m (20g); 13 m per add. 20g
July 1, 1943	UK & Éire letter	15 m (20g); 10 m per add. 20g
July 1, 1943	Foreign postcard	13 m
July 1, 1943	UK & Éire postcard	10 m
July 1, 1943	Inland printed matter	3 m per 50g; (Bale lists 1.05.1941)
July 1, 1943	Foreign printed matter	5 m per 50g
July 1, 1943	Inland commercial papers	3 m per 50g
July 1, 1943	Foreign commercial papers	5 m per 50g; minimum 250g
April 5, 1945	Small packet	8 m (50g); 8 m per add. 50g
April 5, 1945	Inland Express	40 m for distances up to 3 km; 35 m per add. 1 km
April 5, 1945	Foreign Express	40 m

== See also ==
- Postage stamps and postal history of Palestine
- Postage stamps and postal history of Israel
- Post offices in the British Mandate of Palestine

== Sources ==
- Bale : the stamps of Palestine Mandate 1917–1948, 9th ed. (2000). Joseph D. Stier (ed.). Chariot. ISSN 1350-679X.
- Proud, Edward B. (2006). The postal history of Palestine and Transjordan. Heathfield. ISBN 1-872465-89-7. First edition (1985): The postal history of British Palestine 1918-1948.
