= List of Ottoman post offices in Palestine =

The List of Ottoman post offices in Palestine contains those post offices operated in Palestine during Ottoman rule. The establishment of a new imperial postal system in 1834 and development of the transportation network resulted in vast improvements in the transport and communications systems. International and domestic post offices were operated by the Ottoman administration in almost every large city in Palestine, including Acre, Haifa, Safed, Tiberias, Nablus, Jerusalem, Jaffa, and Gaza.

The Imperial edict of 12 Ramasan 1256 (14 October 1840) led to substantial improvements in the Ottoman postal system and a web of prescribed and regular despatch rider (tatar) routes was instituted. Beginning in 1841, the Beirut-route was extended to serve Palestine, going from Beirut via Damascus and Acre to Jerusalem.

Postal services were organized at the local level by the provincial governors and these leases (posta mültesimi) came up for auction annually in the month of March. It is reported that in 1846 Italian businessmen Santelli and Micciarelli became leaseholders and ran a service from Jerusalem to Ramle, Jaffa, Sûr, and Saida. By 1852, a weekly service operated from Saida via Sûr, Acre (connection to Beirut), Haifa, and Jaffa to Jerusalem, also serving Nablus beginning in 1856. That same year, two new routes came into operation: Jerusalem–Hebron–Gaza, and Tiberias–Nazareth–Chefa Omer–Acre. In 1867, the Jerusalem-Jaffa route operated twice a week, and beginning in 1884, the Nablus-Jaffa route received daily despatches.

Initially all the postal facilities had the status of relay stations, and letters received their postmarks only at the Beirut post office. In contradiction to that rule, a small number of markings Djebel Lubnan have been discovered: these are believed by philatelists to have been applied by a relay station at Staura (Lebanon). In the 1860s, most relay stations were promoted to the status of branch post offices and received postmarks, initially only negative seals, of their own. The postmarks of an office's postal section usually contained the words posta shubesi, as opposed to telegraf hanei for the telegraph section. In 1860 ten postal facilities worked in Palestine, rising to 20 in 1900 and 32 in 1917.

== Ottoman post offices ==
Place name (Name) (Note: Name of the town or village, as used at the time, plus transcription.)	Population (Year) (Note: Population estimate, latest available figure pre-1918.)	Est. (Note: Establishment of a postal facility (relay or telegraph station, agency, etc.))	Dates of Known Usage (Note: Dates of actual use of postmaks, recorded by philatelists.)					Refs.
Place name (Name)	Population (Year)	Est.	Ord. (Note: Ordinary mail: dated and undated postmarks.)	Reg. (Note: Registered mail: teahud olunmushdur marks and labels.)	Off. (Note: Official mail: tahirat mühumme markings.)	Tel. (Note: Telegraph marks telegraf chane ve posta.)	Cens. (Note: Censor markings: mu'ajene olunmushdur or sansur.)	Refs.
Acre (`Akkâ)	12000 (1915)	1841	1869–1918	1885–1918	1884–1914		1916–1917	
Afula (`Afula)		1919	1917–1918	1918				
Aioun Cara (`Uyûn Qâra)	950 (1916)		1904–1916	1916				
Beit Djala (Bait Djâla)	6000 (1915)		1913–1916					
Beni Saab (Tulkarem) (Beni Sa`b)	5000 (1916)		1879–1918	1917	1912–1913	1912	1917–1918	
Bethlehem (Bait al-Lahm)	12000 (1915)	1870	1900–1917	1895–1917		1885–1914		
Bireh (al-Bîra)	1000 (1910)		1908–1917			1917		
Bir ul-Sebbe (Bi'r as-Seb`a)	3000 (1915)		1911–1917	1916		1883	1915–1917	
Bissan (Beysân)	3000 (1910)	<1903	1908–1918					
Bon Samaritain (Khân al-Hatrûra)			1902–1914					
Chefa Omer (Shefâ `Amr)	3000 (1918)		1890–1918					
(Rehoboth) (Daurân)	1200 (1918)		1910–1915	1916				
Djaune (Rosch-Pinah) (Djâ`ûn)	1000 (1918)		1910–1918					
Djenine (Djanîn)	2000 (1910)	1871	1871–1918	1918		1895–1897		
Gaza (Ghaza)	30000 (1915)	1856	1970-1917	1902–1917	1893–1903		1916	
Hafir (Hafîr)			1915–1917					
Haifa (Hayfâ)	20000 (1915)	1852	1865–1918	1898–1918		1901–1918	1914–1918	
Haifa Hejaz Railway (Hîfâ Hîmîdiya Hidjâz Demiûryolu)			1907					
Haifa Iskelesi (Port Railway) (Hîfâ `Isqelesi)		<1909	1914					
Haifa Sari ul-Kanasil (German Quarter) (Hayfâ Shâri`a al-Qanâsil)		<1909	1914					
Halasa (Halâsa)			1916–1917					
Halil ul-Rahman (Khalîl ar-Rahmân)	22000 (1916)	1850	1892–1917	1909–1912	1903–1904			
Jaffa (Yafa)	40000 (1915)	1838	1868–1917	1984-1917		1865–1916	1914–1917	
Jaffa Iskelesi (Port) (Yafa Iskelesi)			1895–1899					
Jaffa Menchie (Menshiye)			1910–1915					
Jaffa Tel Abib (Tel Abîb)		<1914	1917					
Jericho (Arîhâ)	1000 (1910)	1900	1900–1918					
Jerusalem (al-Quds)	80000 (1915)	1841	1868–1917	1890–1917	1877–1899	1866–1917	1914–1917	
Jerusalem Camp Imperial (Qudüs Iqâmetkâ-i Imperâtûri)			1898					
Jerusalem Gare (Qudüs Demûryûli)			1901–1911					
Jerusalem Mahna Juda (Mahnâ Yûdâ)			1909–1912					
Jerusalem Méo-Charem (Mûsh`arem)			1904–1917	1910–1917				
Jerusalem Nahlat Shiva (Nahlât Sh(?)îvâ)			1913					
Jerusalem Nôtre Dame de France (Nutr Dâm da Frânsâ)			1912					
Jerusalem Quartier Israelite (Yehûdi Mahalasi)			1895–1917	1896–1917				
Jerusalem Souk el-Attarine (Sûq el-`Atârîn)			1907–1917					
Khan Younesse (Khân Yûnis)		<1909	1914–1916					
Led (Lod)	7000 (1915)	<1895	1908–1917					
Medjdil (Medjdil)	3000 (1915)	<1899	1899–1917					
Nablus (Nâblus)	27000 (1916)	1856	1868–1918	1892–1915	1871–1898		1918	
Nasrie (Nasira)	15000 (1915)	1856	1871–1918	1891–1918	1871–1903	1885–1901	1915–1917	
Ramallah (Râm Allâh)	5000 (1915)	<1903	1904–1915					
Ramle (Ramla)	7000 (1915)	1853	1892–1917		1894–1899			
Safed (Safed)	20000 (1914)		1875–1918	1895–1918	1915	1885–1913	1915	
Samah (Samâh)			1916–1918					
Sheria Nehri Jourdain (Sherî`a Nehri)			1915					
Tabarya (Tabarya)	6000 (1916)	1856	1871–1918	1904–1917	1915	1885–1915		
Umm Lebes (Petah Tikva) (Mlibes)	3600 (1915)		1910–1917	1915–1917				
Zamarin (Zamârîn)	1000 (1914)	<1899	1912–1918	1918				

A number of post offices are only known from archival material such as proof strikes of postmarks in Turkish PTT archives or lists prepared by the Ottoman Post for the UPU before 1914. Philatelists have so far not recorded any genuinely used postmarks or other postal material for these postal facilities:

Place Name (Name)	Est.	Notes	Refs.
al-`Audja (al-`Audja)		possibly identical to Hafir/Auja al-Hafir	
Asloudj (Bi'r `Aslûdj)		only known as proof strike in PTT Archives Ankara	
Bâb al-Wadd			
Beit Sahur (Bait Sâhûr)		only known as proof strike in PTT Archives Ankara	
Bir Birin (Bi'rain)		only known as proof strike in PTT Archives Ankara	
Bir el Zeit (Bi'r az-Zait)		only known as proof strike in PTT Archives Ankara	
Chaara, Wadi el-Shara (Sha`râ)			
Dekirmen Bûrrni		listed only in 1884 PTT lists	
Dharbat as-Sumra (Dharbat as-Sumra)			
Djemain (Jammain)		listed only in 1892 & 1899 PTT lists	
Djesr el-Majami (Mujami Bridge) (Djezr al-Madjâmi)	1909	railway station with telegraph office, listed in 1909 PTT lists	
Haifa Alman Mahallesi (Almân Mahllasi)		possibly identical to Haifa Sari ul-Kanasil (German Quarter)	
Haifa Eastern Gate (Haifa Elbevabet ash-Sharqiya)			
Haifa Hotel Nasara		listed in 1914 PTT lists	
Haifa Iskele			
Haifa Istayonu			
`Irâq al-Manshîya (`Irâq al-Manshîya)		only known as proof strike in PTT Archives Ankara	
Jaffa Souk el-Attarin (Souk el-`Attârin)			
Jaffa Souk el-Necar (Souq al-Nekhâr)		only known as proof strike in PTT Archives Ankara	
Jerusalem Grande Rue (Ghrând Nû Aûtel)		only an agency cachet known, doubtful	
Jerusalem Souk el-Tudjdjar (Sûq el-Tudjâr)		listed in 1909 PTT lists	
Kalkile (Qalqîla)	1913	only known as proof strike in PTT Archives Ankara	
Kaysariya (Qaysârîya)	1913	besides being known as a (telegraph) proof strike in PTT Archives Ankara, genuinely used copies have been reported.. Suspected to be actually the town in Anatolia.	
Mesmiye (Mesmiya)		only known as proof strike in PTT Archives Ankara	
Nablus Hükumet Konag Karshusu (Hukûmat Qunâghi Qarshûsi)			
Safed Yahudi Mahallesi (Yahûdi Mahallasi)		listed in 1909 PTT lists	
Salfit (Salfît)	1903?	listed in 1903 PTT lists	
Sebastiya (Sabâstîyâ)		only known as proof strike in PTT Archives Ankara	
Sharaviye (Sha`raviya (Djenîn))		only known as proof strike in PTT Archives Ankara	
Shatta (Beit Ha Shitta)	1909	railway station with telegraph office, listed in 1909 PTT lists	
Tantoura (Tantûra)	<1899	only known as proof strike in PTT Archives Ankara, listed in PTT lists 1899-1909	
Tel esh-Shamame (Tal ash-Shamâm)	<1909	railway station with telegraph office, listed in 1909 PTT lists	
Wadi el-Harar (Wâdî al-Harâr)		only known as proof strike in PTT Archives Ankara; possibly the Wadi Sarrar railway station. Presumed to be presently known as Kharas, north west of Hebron. Wadies Sarar to the west of Jerusalem was a military siding with no civilian postal facility.	
Yebne (Yebna)			

== Travelling post offices ==
Travelling post offices existed on three routes:

- The Jaffa–Jerusalem route was officially opened on September 26, 1892 with stops at Jaffa, Ludd, Ramle, Sedshed, Deir Aban, Bittir, and Jerusalem. In 1888, the developer Joseph Navon had received a 71-year license, which he later sold to French investors, who operated the company as Société du Chemin de Fer Ottoman de Jaffa à Jerusalem et Prolonguements. The company was nationalized at the start of the war in 1914. Navon's license expressly prohibited the company from transporting mail for the various foreign post offices. Postmarks for this travelling post office, some inscribed Bur. Amb. Jerusalem–Jaffa, are registered by collectors from May 13, 1893 to December 14, 1914.
- The Damascus–Haifa route was completed in 1906 as a branch of the Hejaz Railway with stops at Dera'a, Muzerib, Zeizun, Tel el-Makarim, El-Hadshara, Wadi Kleit, El-Hammi, Semach, Dshisr el-Majami, Beit Shean, Shatta, Afule, Tel esh-Shamam, Esh-Shamaria, and Haifa. Postmarks for this travelling post office, inscribed Damas–Caiffa, are registered by collectors from 1908 to June 2, 1921 (one postmark remained in use during E.E.F. control).
- The Messudshi–Nablus route was completed in 1914. Use of the postmark inscribed Nablous–Caiffa/Ambulant is only known for September 25, 1914.

No TPO postmarks are known for other railway lines operating during this period, irrespective of whether these lines actually did transport mail. Lines operating were (year of completion): Acre–Beled esh-Shech (1912), Afule–Djennine (1913), Djennine–Messudshi (1914), Messudshi–Tulkarem–Ludd (1915), Wadi Sarrar–Et-Tine–Beersheba, Beersheba–Hafir (1915), Et-Tine–Gaza (1916), and Deir el-Balah–Beersheba (1916).

== See also ==
- Ottoman postal rates in Palestine
- Postage stamps and postal history of Palestine

== References and sources ==
Header Notes

Notes

Sources

- Abuljebain, Nader K. (2001). Palestinian history in postage stamps = تاريخ فلسطين في طوابع البري. Beirut: Institute for Palestine Studies/Welfare Association.
- Birken, Andreas (2007). Die Poststempel = The postmarks. Volumes Beirut and Suriye. Hamburg: Arbeitsgemeinschaft Osmanisches Reich/Türkei, ©2003, 2007. (CD-ROM, updated irregularly)
- Coles, John H. and Howard E. Walker (1987). Postal cancellations of the Ottoman Empire. Part 2: the lost territories in Africa and Asia. London & Bournemouth: Christie's Robson Lowe. ISBN 0-85397-426-8.
- Collins, Norman J. and Anton Steichele (2000). The Ottoman post and telegraph offices in Palestine and Sinai. London: Sahara. ISBN 1-903022-06-1.
- Levy, Thomas E. (1995). The Archaeology of Society in the Holy Land. Continuum. ISBN 0-7185-1388-6.
- Lindenberg, Paul P. (1926). Das Postwesen Palästinas vor der britischen Besetzung. Vienna: Die Postmarke.
