= List of Ottoman postal rates in Palestine =

Postal rates in Palestine

The List of Ottoman postal rates in Palestine surveys the postal rates in effect between 1840 and 1918 during the Ottoman rule in Palestine. Rates not applicable in Palestine are not included.

The Imperial edict of 12 Ramasan 1256 (14 October 1840) and later ordinances made the distinction between three types of mail items: ordinary letters, registered letters (markings te'ahudd olunmoshdur), and official letters (markings tahirat-i mühümme). Prior to the Imperial Edict, the Ottoman postal service was intermittent for the inland cities in Palestine. Fees were calculated by the type of mail, the weight, and the distance (measured in hours): in 1840, an ordinary letter, weighing less than 10g, had a cost per hour of 1 para. Special fees applied to samples, insured mail, special delivery, and printed matters, etc. The postal rates changed frequently, and new services were added over the years. Upon joining the Universal Postal Union on 1 July 1875, Ottoman overseas rates conformed to UPU rules.

== Postal rates ==
Date	Rate details and subsequent changes (relevant to Palestine)	
October 14, 1840	Regular mail	1 para per 3 dirhem (ca. 9.6g) and 1 hour; half a para increase per additional dirhem and hour
October 14, 1840	Official mail	twice base rate
October 14, 1840	Printed matter & newspapers	one quarter para per 5 dirhem and 1 hour
October 14, 1840	Samples	10 para per hour and okka (1282g)
October 14, 1840	Special delivery	25 kuruş base fee plus 3.5 kuruş per hour
October 14, 1840	Insurance	2 para per hour per 1000 kuruş of value; special rate for silver coins: 12 para per hour per 1000 kuruş of value
January 22, 1843	Newspapers	for a small format newspaper and up to 60 hours: 10 para; for any newspaper over 60 hours: 20 para
February 1, 1858	Newspapers	for a local newspaper and up to 50 hours: 20 para; 51 up to 100 hours: 40 para, over 101 hours: 60 para
January 17, 1861	Newspapers	for a daily newspaper and up to 50 hours: 2 para; 51 up to 100 hours: 4 para, over 101 hours: 6 para
September 17, 1863	Regular mail	1 kuruş per 3 dirhem (9.6g) and up to 50 hours; 51 up to 100 hours: 3 kuruş. For every 100 hours over the first 100 hours: 2 kuruş additional (maximum: 11 kuruş). Weight over 3 dirhem: 50% increase per dirhem.
September 17, 1863	Registration	twice base rate
September 17, 1863	Official mail	same as civil rate
September 17, 1863	Newspapers	up to 50 hours: 10 para; 51 up to 100 hours: 20 para, over 101 hours: 30 para. Seamail: 20 para
October 3, 1868	Regular mail	1.5 kuruş per 3 dirhem (9.6g) and up to 100 hours; 101 up to 200 hours: 3 kuruş. More than 200 hours: 6 kuruş. Seamail: 1 kuruş
October 3, 1868	Newspapers	5 para per 5 dirhem (16g): 10 para for 5 up to 10 dirhem, over 10 dirhem: 20 para
October 31, 1871	Weight measure decimalized: 10g instead of 3 dirhem (9.6g)	
October 31, 1871	Official mail	free
1876	Foreign letters (UPU)	1 kuruş and 10 para per 10g; postcards (UPU): 20 para
October 15, 1882	Regular mail	2 kuruş per 10g; seamail: 20 para per 10g, postcards: 20 para
October 15, 1882	Foreign letters (UPU)	1 kuruş per 10g; postcards (UPU): 20 para
October 15, 1882	Postage due	twice the actual rate
October 15, 1882	Printed matter & newspapers	5 para up to 15g; up to 30g: 10 para, more than 30g: 20 para. Large format: 20 para up to 85g. Seamail: 10 para per 75g
October 15, 1882	Samples	10 para up to 50g; up to 100g: 1 kuruş, 101 up to 200g: 2 kuruş, 200 up to 250g: 2 kuruş 10 para, additionally 20 para per extra 50g (maximum: 2000g)
September 6, 1888	Regular mail	1 kuruş per 15g
September 6, 1888	Registration	1 kuruş
September 6, 1888	Advice of receipt	1 kuruş
August 12, 1900	Money orders	20 paras up to 100 kuruş value; over 100 and up to 500 kuruş value: 20 paras per 100 kuruş value; over 500 and up to 2000 kuruş value: 20 paras per 200 kuruş value
August 12, 1900	Insurance	1 kuruş per 1000 kuruş of value
June 14, 1901	Parcels (sea or rail)	4 kuruş per 5 kg (using one sea or railway line); using two sea or railway lines: 8 kuruş per 5 kg; using three or more sea or railway lines: 10 kuruş per 5 kg
June 14, 1901	Parcels (land)	20 kuruş per 5 kg (within same province); to adjacent province: 35 kuruş per 5 kg; to province removed by one province: 50 kuruş per 5 kg; to province removed by two provinces: 65 kuruş per 5 kg; to province removed by more than two provinces: 80 kuruş per 5 kg
June 14, 1901	Int. parcels	11 kuruş per 5 kg
October 13, 1903	festive postcards	up to 30g: 5 para per five words; up to 50g: 10 para
July 26, 1913	postal cheques	20 para for up to 10 kuruş value
July 8, 1915	war orphan tax	10 para per letter; 20 para per registered letter; 5 kuruş per telegram, 1 kuruş per insured item

Currency:

- 1 Lira (Pound) = 100 kuruş
- 1 kuruş = 40 para

== See also ==
- Ottoman post offices in Palestine
- Postage stamps and postal history of Palestine

== References and sources ==
Notes

Sources

- Collins, Norman J. and Anton Steichele (2000). The Ottoman post and telegraph offices in Palestine and Sinai. London: Sahara. ISBN 1-903022-06-1.
- Steichele, Anton (1990/1991). The foreign post offices in Palestine : 1840–1918. 2 vols. Chicago: World Philatelic Congress of Israel, Holy Land, and Judaica Societies.
