= The Stamp Specialist =

The Stamp Specialist is the title of a series of books on philatelic research written and edited for the advanced collector of postage stamps.

== Publisher ==
The books were published by H. L. Lindquist, 2 West 46 Street, New York City.

== Format ==
Twenty books were issued between 1939 and 1948. Early books were paper bound, but the majority was hard-bound and each later book was usually popularly identified by the color of its hard cover.

== Content ==
Each book contains six or more studies of research by eminent philatelic experts, each related to a particular detailed philatelic subject.

Article title and authors of the articles:

=== Volume 1, part 1 (1939) ===
- Miscellany - George B. Sloane
- Mounting and Filing Entire Covers and Postal Stationery - A. Eugene Michel
- Color - A. Maerz
- The United States Five Cent Stamp of 1847 - Stanley B. Ashbrook
- Post Office Seals - Prescott Holden Thorp
- The Confederate States of America 1863 Ten Cent Blue - Stanley B. Ashbrook
- Guam Guard Mail - H. F. Bowker
- The Development of the Rotary Press Printing - Max G. Johl
- Unusual Methods of Mounting - Paul F. Berdanier, Jr. and others
- American and European Methods of Specializing - Edwin Mueller
- Philatelic Auction Survey
- An Analysis of Prices Realized for U.S. Stamps Over a Period of Fifty Years - Charles J. Phillips

=== Volume 1, part 2 (1939) ===
- Independent Mail Routes of the United States - Harry M. Konwiser & Laurence B. Mason
- A Study of the Major Varieties of the U.S. 3c 1851 - Richard McP. Cabeen
- Roman States - The Original and Counterfeits of the First Issue - Fritz Billig
- Pages of Aristocrats from My Stamp Album - Philip H. Ward, Jr.
- The "Used Abroads" of Great Britain - Lou W. Kreicker & Major H.P. Burrell
- The Australian Pennies of the King George V Issue - Wm. J. Davy
- New York Post Office, Some Early "Steamship" Markings - Stanley B. Ashbrook
- The "Southn. Letter Unpaid" Marking of Louisville, Ky. June and July 1861 - Lawrence L. Schenfield
- Preliminary Report on the Survey on Condition -
- Airmail Stamps at Auction, An Analysis of American and English Prices Realized During the Past Year
- What Chance Has the Mail Bidder at a Stamp Auction and Other Pertinent Data

=== Volume 1, Part 3 (1940) ===
- The Penny Black, Philately's Number One - includes an oversize engraving of a Penny Black - Lou W. Kreicker & Major H.P. Burrell
- The United States 12c-24c-30c and 90c Imperforates of 1860 - Stanley B. Ashbrook
- United States Postal History - Part 1 - Seymour Dunbar
- Philately Honors the Constitution - C. N. Downs
- Steamboat Mail Transportation on the Great Lakes - The Ward Steamship Lines - W. L. Babcock, M.D.
- C.C.C. "Socked on the Nose" - Theodore E. Steinway
- Unusual Methods of Mounting
- Revised report on the Survey on Condition
- How to Distinguish Stamp Varieties - Edwin Mueller

=== Number 4 (1940) ===
- Paper. A Non-technical History and Description of the More Common Types as used in Philately - James H. Obrig
- Aviation and Philately, based on the Norman Serphos Collection - Frank L. Wilson
- United States Postal History (Part 2) - Seymour Dunbar
- The Three Cent 1857 - What to look for in the Perforated Issue - Richard McP. Cabeen
- The First Stamps of Honduras - Bertram W. H. Poole
- 40 Years of United States Special Delivery Stamps - C. W. Bates
- Methods of Mounting - Paul F. Berdanier, Jr.
- Final Report on the Survey on Condition
- INCLUDED WITH BOOK #4 PAPER SAMPLES:

 - "SUPPLEMENT TO THE STAMP SPECIALIST Number 4 (1940) - A glassine packet of nine enclosed paper samples to be mounted with stamp hinges or pasted, in the spaces allocated to them on the pages.
The spaces for the paper samples to be mounted are within the article, " Paper. A Non-technical History and Description of the More Common Types as used in Philately - James H. Obrig

=== Orange (1941) ===
- Designs for United States stamps – Paul F. Berdanier, Jr.
- The Supplementary Mail Service of the New York Post office 1853-1872 – Stanley B. Ashbrook with comments by Dr. W. L. Babcock
- Poland – the stampless period – Stephen G. Rich and Vincent Domanski, Jr.
- The Luff reference collection – H. L. Lindquist
- The engraver of the Five Cents De La Rue – August Dietz
- Specializing in twentieth century United States stamps – Max G. Johl

=== Blue (1941) ===
- Thru the Newbury deluxe collection of the 19th century United States - Stanley B. Ashbrook
- Jammu and Kashmir – Notes on Their Stamps - Winthrop S. Boggs
- United States postal history - Seymour Dunbar
  - A Canal Boat letter group
  - A World’s Fair group
  - A Railway Post Office group
- A Primer of the first Greek postage stamps - Robert O. Truman
- The capped relief of the Two Cents 1890 - John H. Latta, C.P.A.
- “Neither rain – nor snow – nor gloom of war...” Three letters that crossed the lines in the American Civil War - Lawerence L. Shenfield
- Poland, the period of stamps, to 1870 - Vincent Domanski Jr. & Stephen G. Rich

=== Yellow (1942) ===
- The Five Cent of 1847 Double Transfers - Stanley B. Ashbrook
- Prisoner of War and Flag-of-Truce Covers - Lawerence L. Shenfield
- Supplement to Independent Mail Routes of the United States - Harry M. Konwiser
- United States Postal History
  - Postal Memorials of Human Slavery and Lincoln - Seymour H. Dunbar
- The Autaugaville Alabama Stamps - Howard Lehman
- Countries for the Specialist
  - Norway - H. L. Lindquist
  - France - Dr. A. J. C. Vaurie
  - Great Britain - Major H.P. Burrell
  - Finland - Arthur Linz
  - Canada - Walter Pollock
  - Guatemala - H. L. Lindquist
- United States - The "Premieres Gravures" of 1861 - Stanley B. Ashbrook
- Census of Philatelists
  - How Many stamp collectors Are There

=== Red (1942) ===
- Canada-17c-1859, A Study of its Plate Positions - Senator James A. Calder
- Four Historical Covers from the Spanish–American War Period in Puerto - R. B. Preston
- China - James Starr
- Coffee House and Newsroom Mail. The Origin of the Postal System in America - Abe Schoenfeld
- A Great Historic Document Comes to Light - General Winfield Scott's Proclamation to the People of Mexico
- The Puerto Rican Columbian Commemorative Stamp of 1893 - R. B. Preston
- Confederate Notes - Stanley B. Ashbrook
  - Newly Discovered Prisoner of war cover with "Examined - Ship Island" in red
  - "Raleigh N. C. Paid 5" Postmaster Provisional or Handstamped Paid?
- Philatelic Byways thru 19th Century B.N.A. - Ed Richardson
  - British Columbia and Vancouver's Island
  - New Brunswick
  - Nova Scotia
  - Prince Edward Island
- Countries for the Specialist
  - Ecuador - H. L. Lindquist
- Confederate Blockade Covers including some Unusual Examples - Van Dyk MacBride
- "Forwarded By" Handstamps - Harry M. Konwiser

=== Green (1943) ===
- The Trans-Mississippi Issue of 1898 (The So-Called Omaha Issue) - George B. Sloane
- The Bull's Eyes of Brazil (in Celebration of the Hundredth Anniversary) - H. L. Lindquist
- Unusual Aguinaldos in One of the Most Theatrical and Interesting Interludes in the History of the Philippine Islands - Col. Hans Lagerloef
- Guadeloupe, The Emerald Island - Robert G. Stone
- Confederate Stamps-On-Provisional Covers - Van Dyk MacBride
- Siam-Thailand - Adolph Klingenstein
- Egypt - Ernest A. Kehr
- Embossed Revenue Stamped Paper of the United States - Carl E. Dorr
- The Swastika in Philately - William T. Corbusier

=== Brown (1943) ===
- The 30 Cents Black Imperforate of 1860 - R. J. Mechin
- Confederate Notes - Lawrence L. Shenfield
  - How the Fighting Men of the 5th Texas Regiment C.S.A. got their letters across the Mississippi to Texas
  - Southern Express Company Office Marking of Vicksburg, Mississippi
- The Democracy of Philately - The Rev'd. William H. Tower
- Canada 17c-1859. The Identification of its Printings through the use of Comparative Color Charts - Senator James A. Calder
- Puerto Rico - The 1873-1876 Overprinted Issues - R. B. Preston
- Russia - The Small Head U.S.S.R. Types of 1923-1927 - H. L. Aronson
- The Raleigh N.C. Provisional - A Correction - Stanley B. Ashbrook
- A Study of the Color of 1861, 3c U.S. Design Stamp - Wm. H. Beck

=== Gray (1943) ===
- The 6 Cents Lincoln Bank Note Issue - George C. Hahn
- A Sheaf of War Covers - The Rev'd. William H. Tower
- Canadian Patriotics and Related Boer War Covers - Ed. Richardson
- An Important Discovery on the United States 1898 4c Stamp - Ferrars Tows
- Early Foreign Mail Service From Peru - Arthur Linz
- History of the Bureau of Engraving and Printing - Thomas F. Morris
- Confederate Mexico Covers - A sequel to "Confederate Blockade Covers" - Van Dyk MacBride
- Iceland - Joseph Jaeger

=== Maroon (1944) ===
- The South's "Way of Life" - Random Notes for the Student of Confederates - August Dietz
- The "Large Geneva Eagle" 1846-1848 - Gustave A. von Gross
- Southern Censorship of the South Bound Mail - August Dietz
- Puerto Rico - The British Postal Agencies in Puerto Rico - R. B. Preston
- A Primer of English Postal History to the Adhesive Period - The Rev'd. William H. Tower
- The Maryland State Issue of 1818 of Revenue Stamped Paper - Colin MacR. Makepeace
- Philatelic Byways Thru 19th Century BNA-Victorian Canada - Ed Richardson
- Captain Absalom Grimes - The Confederate Mail Carrier - Van Dyk MacBride
- The Postal History of the Ionian Islands - Colonel Hans Lagerloef

=== White (1944) ===
- The City Delivery Letter Expresses of San Francisco - Ernest A. Wiltsee
- Air Mail Interruption Covers - R. Lee Black
- National Defense Issue - George C. Hahn and Sol Glass
- "Pan. & San Fran. S.S." (Panama and San Francisco Steam Ship) - Stanley B. Ashbrook
- Puerto Rico - Postal Markings of the 1855-1873 Period - R. B. Preston and M. H. Sanborn
- United States Savings Stamps - A New Field for the Specialist - H. L. Lindquist
- The Royal Genealogies in Stamps - Harold F. Round

=== Black (1945) ===
- Barnard’s Caribou Express – in the Colony of British Columbia, 1860-1971 and later expresses of F. J. Barnard - Henry C. Hitt and Gerald E. Wellborn
- Some notes on the Harold C. Brooks collection of Confederate States of America - Stanley B. Ashbrook
- Patriotic cover fishing - Rollin E. Flower
- A huge find of rare western franks – many hitherto unknown varieties - Ernest A Wiltsee
- Insurance cancellations on Civil War revenues 1862-1871 - Jere. Hess Barr
- Don’t ignore the letters – a cover collector points out the interest and romance to be found in the contents of your covers - Towner K. Webster, Jr.
- A letter from Libby Prison - Van Dyk MacBride
- “Canada Mourns Her Beloved Queen” - Ed Richardson
- Syndicate envelopes - Thomas D. Perry

=== Coral (1945) ===
- The Overrun Nations series - Sol Glass
- Poland, the postal stationery - Clement A. Pulaski
- The Early Postal History of Peru - Arthur Linz
- Russian Zemstvos, a compendium of existing information with additional information based on original research - Col. Hans Lagerloef
- Norway, a few notes on the unlisted 1882-3 Issue - Gustave Larson
- Philadelphia’s part in the Civil War - George N. Malpass
- Brazilian postal forgeries - Samuel Ray

=== Emerald (1946) ===
- Confederate States of America - Stanley B. Ashbrook
  - Some Notes on the Postal Legislation
  - Postal Rates
  - Postal Uses and Earliest Known Dates of the Stamps of the General Issues
- Trans-Atlantic Mails - Major F. W. Staff
- Austria and Lombardy-Venetia, The Re-Engravings on the Dotted Background of the First Issue - Felix Brunner
- Puerto Rico - R. B. Preston
  - The Bogus Stamps of 1897
  - Revenue Stamps used for Postage
- The Development of The Electric Eye - Nathan Goldstein II
- Poland - Clement A. Pulaski
  - The Postal Stationery
  - Stamped Envelope
  - Letter Card

=== India (1946) ===
- The Autographed Field Letters of General Robert E. Lee - Van Dyk MacBride
- Lee Envelopes in the Congressional Library, Washington, D.C. -
- Stamp Booklets and Booklet Panes - Sidney S. Jalkut
- Stamp Booklets and Booklet Panes of the World (the first known comprehensive compilation of these items ever made) - Sidney S. Jalkut
- 1860-1863 Three Cents Plus One Cent Plus One Cent - Stanley B. Ashbrook
- Belgium Postal Savings and Roulette Cancellations - Lt. Com'd'r. Ray E. Morrison
- Norway - A Century of Steamship Mail Service - Gustav Larson
- Milwaukee Handstamps and Their Use - Kenneth F. Olson

=== Mahogany (1947) ===
- Burdell's Express - J. R. W. Purves, F.R.P.S.L
- Express Company Labels of the United States - Harry M. Konwiser
- Stamp Booklets and Booklet Panes - Sidney S. Jalkut
- United States Postal Agency, Shanghai, China - Harvey Bounds
- The Life of Christ on Postage Stamps - George A. Rowse
- Stamped Revenue Paper Issued by Province of Mass., Colony of New York, and by Gt. Britain for Use in America - Leland Powers
- The Postage Due Issues of Norway, A Translation - Gustav Larson
- Camp Shenandoah, Va. - Van Dyk MacBride
- Some Comments on the U.S. Playing Card Stamps - John C. Rogers, Ph.D., M.D.
- The British Postal Service from Peru - Arthur Linz

=== Chartreuse (1948) ===
- Dies of the Columbian stamped envelopes, commemoratives of 1893 - F. L. Ellis
- A check list of uncataloged envelopes bearing patriotic designs of southern sentiment - George N. Malpass
- Puerto Rico; the postmaster provisionals of 1898 - R. B. Preston
- The street car R. P. O. system - Earl D. Moore
- A discovery in 1860 issue of Peru: double transfers - Arthur Linz
- Eights - Frank W. Staff
- The overrun nations series, the flag stamps - Supplement to Article Appearing in The Stamp Specialist Coral Book - Sol Glass
- A sequel to the autographed field letters of General Robert E. Lee - Van Dyk MacBride
- Stamp booklets and booklet panes - Second Supplement to List of Booklets in India Book - (First Supplement, Mahogany Book)

=== Forest Green (1948) ===
- Fairs, Exhibitions and Expositions and Their Souvenirs - Raymond March
- Canada 5d 1859 - Renumbering of Flaws - G. A. E. Chapman
- Guatemala, the 100 Varieties of the One Peso Lithographed Identified - H. L. Lindquist
- "Camp Shenandoah, Va." - Were There TWO? - Van Dyk MacBride
- Teaching With Stamps - Louis H. Drinkwine
- The Alfonso XII Issues for Puerto Rico - R. B. Preston
- The Penny Postage Jubilee of 1890 - Stephen G. Rich
- Stamp Booklets and Booklet Panes - Sydney S. Jalkut
- The Stamp Specialist Enters a New Phase
- Index to the Stamp Specialist

== See also ==
- H. L. Lindquist
- Philately
- Philatelic literature
