= James J. Matejka Jr. =

American philatelist

- Born: October 27, 1916
- Died: November 30, 1979 (aged 63)
- Known for: World class collections of postage stamps and postal history

James J. Matejka Jr. (October 27, 1916 – November 30, 1979) of Chicago, Illinois, was an American philatelist at the local, national, and international level.

== Collecting interests ==
Matejka was well regarded in all fields of philately, but was especially known for his philatelic collections of Czechoslovakia, Newfoundland airmail stamps and the postal history of the Alaska-Yukon Territory.

== Philatelic activity ==
Matejka was active within most of the philatelic clubs in the Chicago, Illinois, area, including the Chicago Philatelic Society where he was awarded the Newbury Award in 1959.

At the national level, he was active and held various posts in the Society for Czechoslovak Philately, the American Air Mail Society and the Society of Philatelic Americans. He also served on the Citizens' Stamp Advisory Committee of the Post Office Department. Matejka also served as judge at various philatelic exhibitions.

== Honors and awards ==
Matejka was a recipient in 1959 of the Newbury Award of the Chicago Philatelic Society. He signed the Roll of Distinguished Philatelists in 1979 and was named to the American Philatelic Society Hall of Fame in 1981.

== See also ==
- Philatelic literature
