= Richard McPherren Cabeen =

American philatelist (1887–1969)

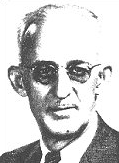
- Chicago Tribune, 1949
- Born: May 11, 1887
- Died: April 13, 1969 (aged 81)
- Other names: Sandy Cabeen
- Spouse: Blema E. Cabeen
- Awards: Luff Award; APS Hall of Fame; Newbury Award

Richard McPherren (Sandy) Cabeen (May 11, 1887 – April 13, 1969) was a well-known philatelist in the Chicago area, and one of the foremost writers of philatelic literature. He married Blema Eulaila Meagher on October 28, 1910.

== Collecting interests ==
Cabeen was interested in various aspects of American philately, but tended to specialize. He was particularly interested in the United States 3-cent 1851-57 postage stamps, and along with Dr. Carroll Chase, was able to successfully plate the stamp, which involves identifying the position of each stamp as it would have appeared on the original printed sheet. In addition to collecting and studying such classic United States stamps, Cabeen also directed his attention and studies to postal history of Chicago and Illinois.

== Philatelic literature ==
Richard Cabeen was a prolific writer of philatelic subjects. He originally wrote in 1913 for The Collector's Journal and Weekly Philatelic Gossip, and from 1932 to 1969, he wrote a philatelic column for the Chicago Sunday Tribune. Cabeen also wrote a series of monographs entitled The Chicago Tribune Series of Booklets on United States Stamps, and in 1957 published his book, The Standard Handbook of Stamp Collecting, which has been reprinted a number of times. He and Dr. Carroll Chase co-authored The First Hundred Years of Territorial Postmarks 1787-1887, originally a series of articles which was later published in book form.

== Honors and awards ==
Cabeen received the Luff Award for Distinguished Philatelic Research in 1966 and was named to the American Philatelic Society Hall of Fame in 1971.

== Legacy ==
In August 1967, Richard McPherren Cabeen and his wife Blema E. Cabeen bequeathed their townhouse to the Collectors Club of Chicago so that it could be used as a center of Chicago philately. As a measure of gratitude, the Collectors Club of Chicago commissioned Harvey M. Karlen to edit and publish a book entitled, Chicago Postal History: Selections that Honor the Collecting Interests of Richard McP. Cabeen. Recognizing the bequeath of the townhouse, Collectors Club of Chicago made Cabeen an honorary life member in January 1968.

== See also ==
- Chicago Philatelic Society
