= Charles Esterly Severn =

American philatelist

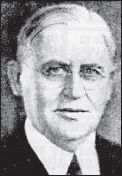
- Born: July 5, 1872
- Died: December 14, 1929 (aged 57)
- Spouse: Eveleen Mary Weldon Severn
- Engineering career
- Institutions: Chicago Philatelic Society
- Projects: Editor of Mekeel's Weekly Stamp News
- Awards: APS Hall of Fame; Roll of Distinguished Philatelists

Charles Esterly Severn (July 5, 1872 – December 14, 1929), of Chicago, Illinois, was a philatelist who dedicated his entire career as editor of philatelic publications.

== Philatelic literature ==
At Mekeel's Weekly Stamp News, founded by Charles Haviland Mekeel, Severn was initially assigned as the Chicago correspondent in 1894. In 1898 Severn became editor and part-owner for the remainder of his life. During his tenure at Mekeel's Weekly Stamp News, the periodical published a number of significant philatelic monographs and articles, and purchased the competing philatelic journal Weekly Philatelic Era which now became part of the Mekeel company. In 1915 Charles Severn, W. W. Jewett, and Willard Otis Wylie formed the Severn-Wylie-Jewett Company, with Severn as president. The venture was successful and, when Severn died, his wife Eveleen Mary Weldon Severn took over as president of the company.

== Philatelic activity ==
At the Chicago Philatelic Society Severn was a member since 1887, and served a number of posts within the society. He was named a Life Director in 1912.

== Honors and awards ==
Severn signed the Roll of Distinguished Philatelists in 1921. He was named to the American Philatelic Society Hall of Fame in 1941.

== See also ==
- Philately
- Philatelic literature
