= Willard Otis Wylie =

American philatelic editor and writer (1862–1944)

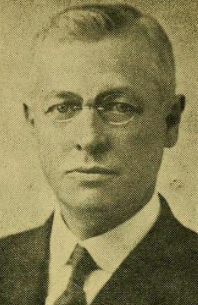
- Born: December 25, 1862
- Died: November 30, 1944 (aged 81)
- Engineering career
- Projects: Editor of the Weekly Philatelic Era and managing editor of Mekeel's Weekly Stamp News
- Awards: APS Hall of Fame

Willard Otis Wylie (December 25, 1862 – November 30, 1944), of Boston, Massachusetts, was a noted philatelic editor and writer.

== Philatelic literature ==
In 1898 Wylie joined the Mekeel's Weekly Stamp News company and, in 1903, was named editor of the Weekly Philatelic Era, which was, by that time, owned and merged by Mekeel’s.

In 1913 the newly formed Severn-Wylie-Jewett Company, a partnership formed by Charles Esterly Severn, W. W. Jewett, and Wylie, purchased Mekeel's Weekly Stamp News and named Charles Severn its president and editor. Willard Wylie was assigned as vice president and managing editor. As part of his duties, Wylie was managing editor of Mekeel's Handbooks, each of which contained articles and monographs on important philatelic subjects. During his administration he was able to solicit and select material from important philatelic writers and published approximately fifty handbooks, the handbook series ending in 1930.

When Mekeel's Weekly Stamp News was moved from Boston, Massachusetts, to Portland, Maine, in 1940, Eveleen Mary Weldon Severn took over as editor and Wylie was named Editor Emeritus.

== Honors and awards ==
Willard Wylie was named to the American Philatelic Society Hall of Fame in 1945.

== See also ==
- 1925–1926 Massachusetts legislature
- 1927–1928 Massachusetts legislature
- Philately
- Philatelic literature
