= Walter R. McCoy =

- Born: January 12, 1880
- Died: June 20, 1952 (aged 72)
- Spouse: Ethel Bergstresser McCoy
- Engineering career
- Institutions: Collectors Club of New York; Philatelic Plate Number Association; American Philatelic Congress
- Projects: Created the largest collection of Bureau issue plate number pieces
- Awards: APS Hall of Fame; USSS Hall of Fame

Walter R. McCoy (January 12, 1880 – June 20, 1952), of New York City, was an advocate of the hobby of stamp collecting and created award-winning collections of his own. He was the husband of Ethel Bergstresser McCoy who was famous for her United States airmail collection.

== Collecting interests ==
Walter McCoy specialized in the collection of Bureau issues and his Bureau plate number collection consisted of 20,580 pieces. It was exhibited at the 1947 Centenary International Exhibition (CIPEX) held in New York City, and won the gold prize. A description of the collection was written by George Benedict Sloane.

== Philatelic activity ==
McCoy, along with his wife Ethel, were very active within the philatelic community. Walter McCoy was one of the founders of the Philatelic Plate Number Association, later renamed the Bureau Issues Association, and later the United States Stamp Society. He was also active at the Collectors Club of New York, serving there as president, and at the Board of Governors of the American Philatelic Congress, where he was a member.

== Walter R. McCoy Award ==
Water McCoy edited the Congress Book of the American Philatelic Congress from 1945 to 1950. His wife, Ethel, created the annual Walter R. McCoy Award for the best article in the Congress Book.

== Honors and awards ==
Walter McCoy was elected to the United States Stamp Society Hall of Fame, and also to the American Philatelic Society Hall of Fame in 1952.

== Legacy ==
After Walter McCoy died, his widow, Ethel, in 1964, donated his famous collection of Bureau issue plate numbers to the Collectors Club of New York.

== See also ==
- Philately
