= Saul Newbury =

American philatelist (1870–1950)

- Born: August 14, 1870
- Died: February 1, 1950 (aged 79)
- Engineering career
- Institutions: Chicago Philatelic Society
- Projects: Creator of several world famous collections of postage stamps; helped advance philately in the Chicago area
- Awards: APS Hall of Fame

Saul Newbury (August 14, 1870 – February 1, 1950), of Chicago, Illinois, was a collector of classic postage stamps. He was so involved in Chicago philately that he was referred to as "Chicago's No. 1 Collector".

== Collecting interests ==
Newbury concentrated on building up world-class and world-famous collections. These included his 1847-1869 issues of the United States, which won him the Grand Award at CIPEX (Centennial International Philatelic Exhibition) in 1947. He was also famous for his collection of classic Brazilian Bull's Eye stamps, plus a collection of classic stamps of Shanghai, China, plus another collection of postage stamps and history of the country of Colombia and stamps issued by its states.

== Philatelic literature ==
Newbury was an advocate of philatelic research and encouraged others in their research. He financed the research of Stanley Bryan Ashbrook, which led to Ashbrook's publication in 1938 of his book The United States One-Cent Stamp of 1851-57.

== Honors and awards ==
Newbury was named to the American Philatelic Society Hall of Fame in 1950.

== Saul Newbury Award ==
The Saul Newbury Award was established by the Chicago Philatelic Society in his honor in 1945. The award was to be "presented annually to the Chicagoan who, over the years has contributed most to philately." The first person to receive the Saul Newbury Award was David Louis Lidman.

== See also ==
- Philately
- Philatelic literature
