= Collectors Club of Chicago =

Coordinates: 41.90148°N 87.62969°W

- Type: Non-profit organization
- Location: Chicago, Illinois, U.S.

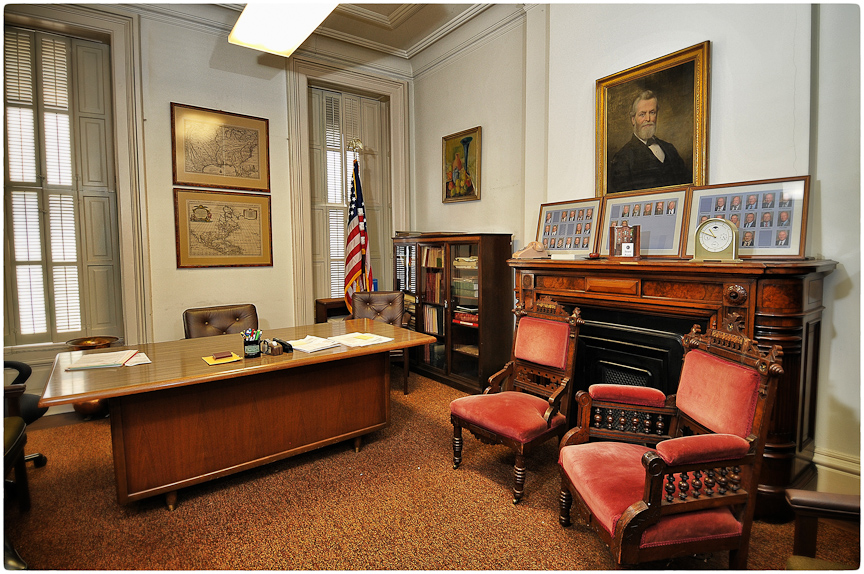
The president's office at the Cabeen House in Chicago.

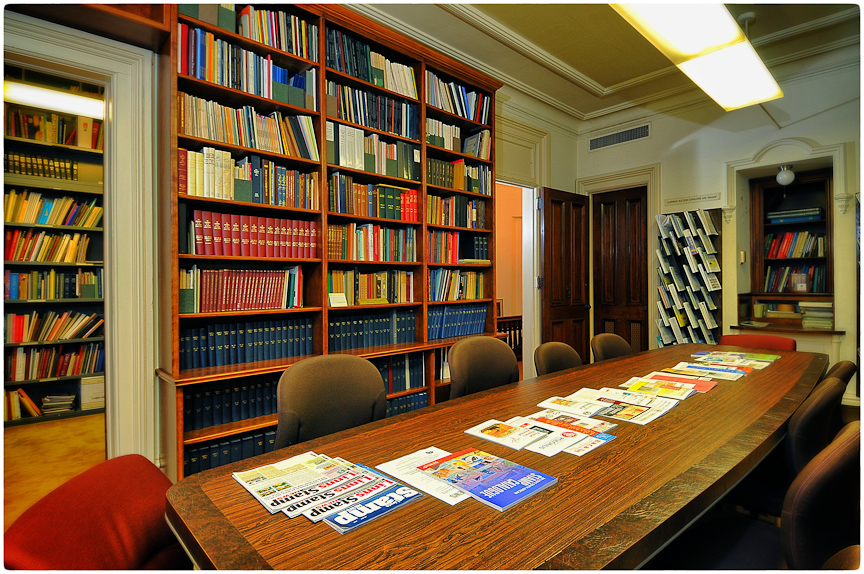
The main reading room on the second floor of the clubhouse

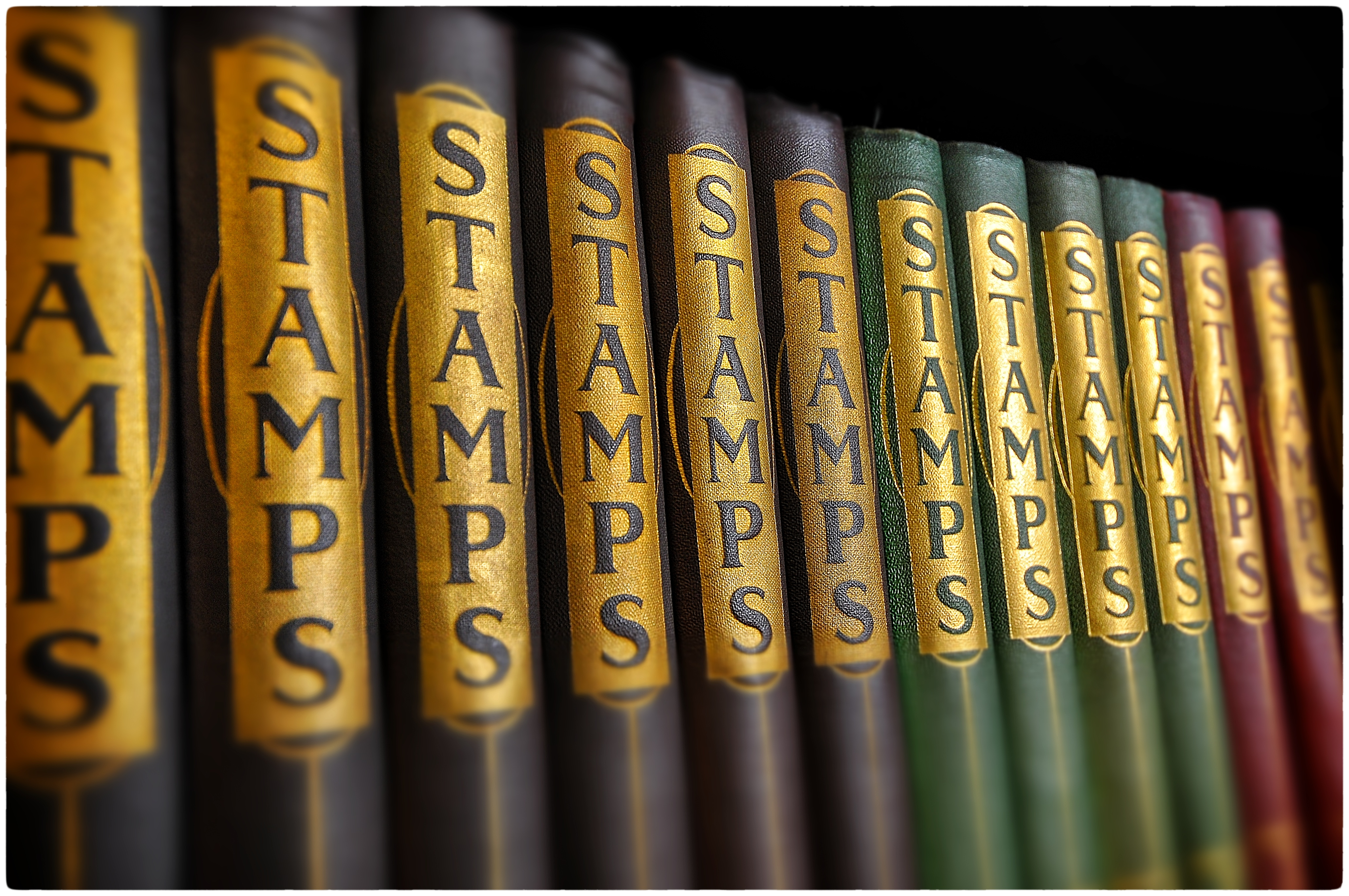
Some books at the CCC library

The Collectors Club of Chicago (CCC) began with informal meetings in the 1920s of specialized collectors residing in the Chicago area.

The CCC was incorporated as a not-for-profit in Illinois.

Meetings continued at members' homes until World War II, at which time the meetings lapsed. On Sunday, November 26, 1944, a reorganization meeting of the then-charter-named "Chicago Collectors resulted in the CCC.

In 1967 CCC member Richard McPherren Cabeen donated his four-level brownstone home in Chicago's downtown "Gold Coast" on North Dearborn Street to be the CCC Clubhouse.

Membership in the club is by invitation only and is ratified by current membership.

== Publications ==
In late 2017, the Collectors Club of Chicago and author Hugh Feldman were awarded top honors for "U.S. Contract Mail Routes by Railroad (1832–1875)" at the Auktionshaus Christoph Gaertner awards ceremony held at MonacoPhil. It was the 5th Annual C.G. International Philatelic Promotion Awards competition.

In summer 2019 in Omaha, author Dr. Yamil Kouri, Jr., won the Literature Grand and Large Gold awards in the American Philatelic Society's StampShow Literature Competition for his book Under Three Flags - The Postal History of the Spanish-Cuban / American War (1895–1898). The book was published by the Collectors Club of Chicago.

Since 1968, the Collectors Club of Chicago, has published 33 original research specialized philatelic handbooks, compendia, and anthologies:

- New York Foreign Mail Cancellations, 1870–1876, Arthur Van Vlissingen and Morrison Waud (1968)
- Chicago Postal History, Editor: Harvey M. Karlen (1971)
- Franks of the Western Express, M. C. Nathan (1973)
- The United States 1869 Issue: An Essay-Proof History, Fred P. Schueren (1974)
- The United States Mail and Post Office Assistant, Editor: Michael Laurence (1975)
- Colorado Territorial and Pre-Territorial Postmarks, David L. Jarrett (1976)
- The Express Mail of 1836–1839, James W. Milgram, M.D. (1984)
- The Flight of the "Ville d'Orleans", Ernst M. Cohn (1978)
- The Waterbury Cancellations, 1850–1890, Paul C. Rohloff (1979)
- The Postal Markings of New Jersey Stampless Covers, William C. Coles, Jr. (1983)
- Vessel-Named Markings on United States Inland and Ocean Waterways, 1810–1890, James W. Milgram. M.D. (1984)
- The Minnesota Territory in Postmarks, Letters and History, Floyd E. Risvold (1985)
- British Pictorial Envelopes of the 19th Century, Ritchie Bodily, Chris Jarvis, and Charless Hahn (1986)
- Postage Due: The United States Large Numeral Postage Due Stamps, 1879–1894, George B. Arfken (1991)
- Chicago's Crabgrass Communities, Harvey M. Karlen (1992)
- An Encyclopedia of Texas Post Offices: Texas Post Offices Under Five Flags, Walter G. Schmidt (1993)
- New Hebrides Islands: Military Postal History of the United States Forces, 1942–1946, Stanley C. Jersey (1994)
- The Stamps of the Mexican Revolution, 1913–1916, Nicholas Follansbee (1996)
- United States Patriotic Covers of World War II, Lawrence Sherman, M.D, (1999)
- The United States Post Office Department in World War II, Lawrence Sherman, M.D. (2002)
- Chicago's Mail, Harvey M. Karlen (2002)
- Canada's Registered Mail, 1802–1909, From Money Letters through Insurance for a Fee, Horace W. Harrison, George B. Arfken, and Harry W. Lussey; Editor: K. Gray Scrimgeour (2002)
- The Hungarian Hyperinflation of 1945–1946: The Postage Rates Postal History of History's Most Impressive Inflation, Robert B. Morgan (2003)
- First United States Perforated Stamps - The 1857 Issue, Jon W. Rose (2005)
- Intercepted in Bermuda: The Censorship of Trans-Atlantic Mail During the Second World War, Peter A. Flynn (2006)
- U.S. Contract Mail Routes by Water: Star Routes, 1824–1875, Hugh V. Feldman (2008)
- United States Ten-Cent 1869 Covers: A Postal Historical Survey, Michael Laurence (2010)
- Detained, Interned, Incarcerated: U.S. Enemy Noncombatant Mail in World War II, Louis Fiset (2010)
- Postage Due - The United States Postage Due Essays, Proofs and Specimens, 1879–1986, by Harry K. Charles, Jr. (2014)
- The Prestamp Period of El Salvador (1525 - 1866), Guillermo F. Gallegos and Joseph D. Hahn (2015)
- Soviet Clandestine Mail Surveillance 1917–1991, David M. Skipton and Steve Volis (2016)
- U.S. Contract Mail Routes by Railroad (1832–1875), Hugh V. Feldman (2017)
- Under Three Flags - The Postal History of the Spanish-Cuban / American War (1895–1898), Yamil H. Kouri Jr. (2019)

== Awards ==
CCC Award of Excellence. This award is given at the discretion of the jury for an exhibit judged to be the most excellent with respect to content, presentation and completion. On an annual basis, it is available for the American Philatelic Society / American Topical Association / American First Day Cover Society Great American Stamp Show and internationally to select FIP (Fédération Internationale de Philatélie) and FIAF (Federación Interamericana de Filatelia) sponsored exhibitions. The made-in-the-USA award is a borosilicate glass crystal with high-definition, three-dimensional hand engraving.

CCC Gold Medallion Award. This award is given to a multi-frame Large Gold or very deserving Gold Medal exhibit for particular merit in:

- Originality in concept
- Strong integration of research
- A new approach to exhibiting
- Exceptionally clear and informative exhibit write-up
- Visual appeal to the public. CCC allows for the Gold Medallion Award to be given to a single-frame exhibit in exceptional circumstances. Judges may designate the award to the Grand or Reserve Grand exhibit in a stamp show, but CCC asks that the award not be bestowed upon exhibits of lower merit.

CCC Robert Pratt Award. The CCC Pratt Award is named for Col. Robert H. Pratt, the pre-eminent Newfoundland stamp and postal history collector, researcher, and author. The award consists of a $US1,000 honorarium awarded annually in its entirety to one or more author(s) for articles or other publications related to the philately of Newfoundland as judged by the CCC Pratt Award Committee.

== Landmarked Clubhouse ==
In a letter to the Club dated August 29, 1967, CCC member Richard McPherren Cabeen and his wife, Blema, formally offered the Collectors Club of Chicago their four-level brownstone home in Chicago's "Gold Coast" area. On September 13, 1967, at a special meeting of the CCC Board of Directors, the Cabeen house gift was accepted.

The Cabeen House at 1029 N. Dearborn St. attained a Chicago Landmark Status on July 10, 2002, as part of the Washington Square Historic District and was listed on the United States National Register of Historic Places on 21 August 2003.

== See also ==
- Collectors Club of New York
