= H. L. Lindquist =

American editor and publisher (1884–1978)

Harry Lemuel Lindquist
- Born: August 15, 1884
- Died: January 16, 1978 (aged 93)
- Engineering career
- Institutions: National Federation of Stamp Clubs
- Projects: President of the National Federation of Stamp Clubs member of the Postmaster General's Citizens' Stamp Advisory Committee
- Awards: Lichtenstein Medal; Luff Award

Harry Lemuel Lindquist (August 15, 1884 – January 16, 1978) was an editor and publisher specializing in the publication of philatelic literature during the early 20th century. He operated his publishing business from New York City at 1 West 46 Street.

== The Stamp Specialist ==
Lindquist was responsible, during the period 1939–1948, for editing and publishing a series of twenty books containing detailed philatelic research by various philatelic writers. The series was entitled “The Stamp Specialist” and most of the books in the series are identified by the color of their cover.

== Other publications ==
Lindquist was responsible for editing or publishing much philatelic literature including the following books:

- Stamp Collecting
- Texas Republic Postal System
- The George Walcott collection of Used Civil War Patriotic Covers
- History of the “Free Franking” of Mail in the United States
- The United States Postage Stamps of the Twentieth Century
- The United States 1 Cent Stamp of 1851–57, Volume I
- The United States 1 Cent Stamp of 1851–57, Volume II
- The United States 10 Cent Stamp of 1855–57.
- The 19th Century Postage Stamps of the United States, Volume I
- The 19th Century Postage Stamps of the United States, Volume II
- The 19th Century Postage Stamps of the United States, Volume III
- Distinguishing Characteristics of Classic Stamps – Europe – 19th Century (Except Old German States)

== Philatelic endeavors ==
Lindquist founded and became president of the National Federation of Stamp Clubs which grew to 600 clubs nationwide and 200,000 members. He also served as a member of the Postmaster General's Citizens' Stamp Advisory Committee, serving in that position 1957 to 1961.

== Honors ==
H. l. Lindquist was awarded significant awards for his efforts in philately:

- Lichtenstein Medal awarded by the Collectors Club of New York in 1957.
- the Luff Award for Outstanding Service to the American Philatelic Society in 1948
- honorary life member of the Royal Philatelic Society London
- signed the Roll of Distinguished Philatelists in 1947
- Benjamin Franklin Award for Distinguished and Outstanding Public Service, awarded by the United States Post Office Department.
- President of the New York Athletic Club from 1950 to 1952

== See also ==
- Philately
- Philatelic literature
- The Stamp Specialist
