= Tevfik Kuyas =

Turkish philatelist

Tevfik Kuyas

Tevfik Kuyas (1916–1989) was a Turkish philatelist who was added to the Roll of Distinguished Philatelists in 1980.

Kuyas was the Royal Philatelic Society London's special representative for Turkey.

He assembled a leading collection of Turkish Tughra stamps from the Brandt, Broadbeck, and Linz collections.
