= Eveleen Mary Weldon Severn =

American philatelist (1882–1942)

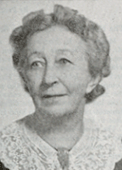
- Eveleen Mary Weldon Severn circa 1940
- Born: 1882
- Died: March 3, 1942 (aged 59–60)
- Spouse: Charles Esterly Severn
- Engineering career
- Institutions: Chicago Philatelic Society; Chicago Woman's Stamp Club; American Philatelic Society
- Projects: Editor of Mekeel's Weekly Stamp News; activist for women’s rights in philately
- Awards: APS Hall of Fame

Eveleen Mary Weldon Severn (1882–1942), of Chicago, Illinois, was a philatelist who pioneered in breaking of the "glass ceiling" encountered by women in the ranks of philately, and founded the first women’s stamp club. She was the husband of Charles Esterly Severn.

== Philatelic literature ==
Eveleen Severn served at Mekeel's Weekly Stamp News in a number of positions, starting in 1929 and finally becoming its editor. Severn used her position at Mekeel’s to attract women into the ranks of philately.

== Women’s rights ==
Up until the 1930s, philately was generally regarded as a "man’s" hobby and women were, in most cases, excluded or at least not encouraged to participate. Eveleen Severn was a crusader for the inclusion of women into philatelic circles, and was one of the founders of Chicago Woman's Stamp Club, the first stamp club exclusively for women. The club was founded on May 13, 1930, and Eveleen Severn was named president.

Continuing her activism for women’s rights, Eveleen Severn applied for membership at the Chicago Philatelic Society, was accepted, and became the first woman member of the society.

== Philatelic activity ==
Eveleen Severn was a member of the American Philatelic Society and served on various committees. In 1940 she was on the committee that presented the first Luff Award, and she was responsible for recommending that the society establish the American Philatelic Society Hall of Fame for deceased philatelists who had made outstanding contributions to philately.

At the Severn-Wylie-Jewett Company, which owned Mekeel's Weekly Stamp News, she assumed the role of president on the death of her husband Charles Esterly Severn. She eventually was appointed editor and continued in that role until she died.

== Honors and awards ==
Eveleen Severn was named to the American Philatelic Society Hall of Fame in 1942.

== See also ==
- Philately
- Philatelic literature
