= Arthur Linz =

American industrial chemist

- Born: 1895
- Died: March 29, 1961 (aged 65–66)
- Education: Columbia University; Zurich Polytechnic Institute
- Occupation: Industrial chemist
- Known for: Study of molybdenum; Philatelic collections and writing
- Board member of: Climax Molybdenum Company

Arthur Linz FAIC, FRPSL, (1895 – March 29, 1961) was an American industrial chemist who specialized in the chemistry of molybdenum and its compounds. He was also a noted philatelist who formed leading collections of the stamps and postal history of Finland, Peru, and Turkey, and wrote extensively about his collecting interests. He formed the majority of the Bernard Payton collection of Peruvian stamps and postal history in the Smithsonian National Postal Museum and his collection of Turkish stamps included a block of tête-bêche "tughra" stamps of the Ottoman Empire that has been described as "arguably the most important Tughra item".

== Early life and education ==
Arthur Linz was born in 1895 and received his advanced education at Columbia University, New York, and the Zurich Polytechnic Institute.

== Career ==
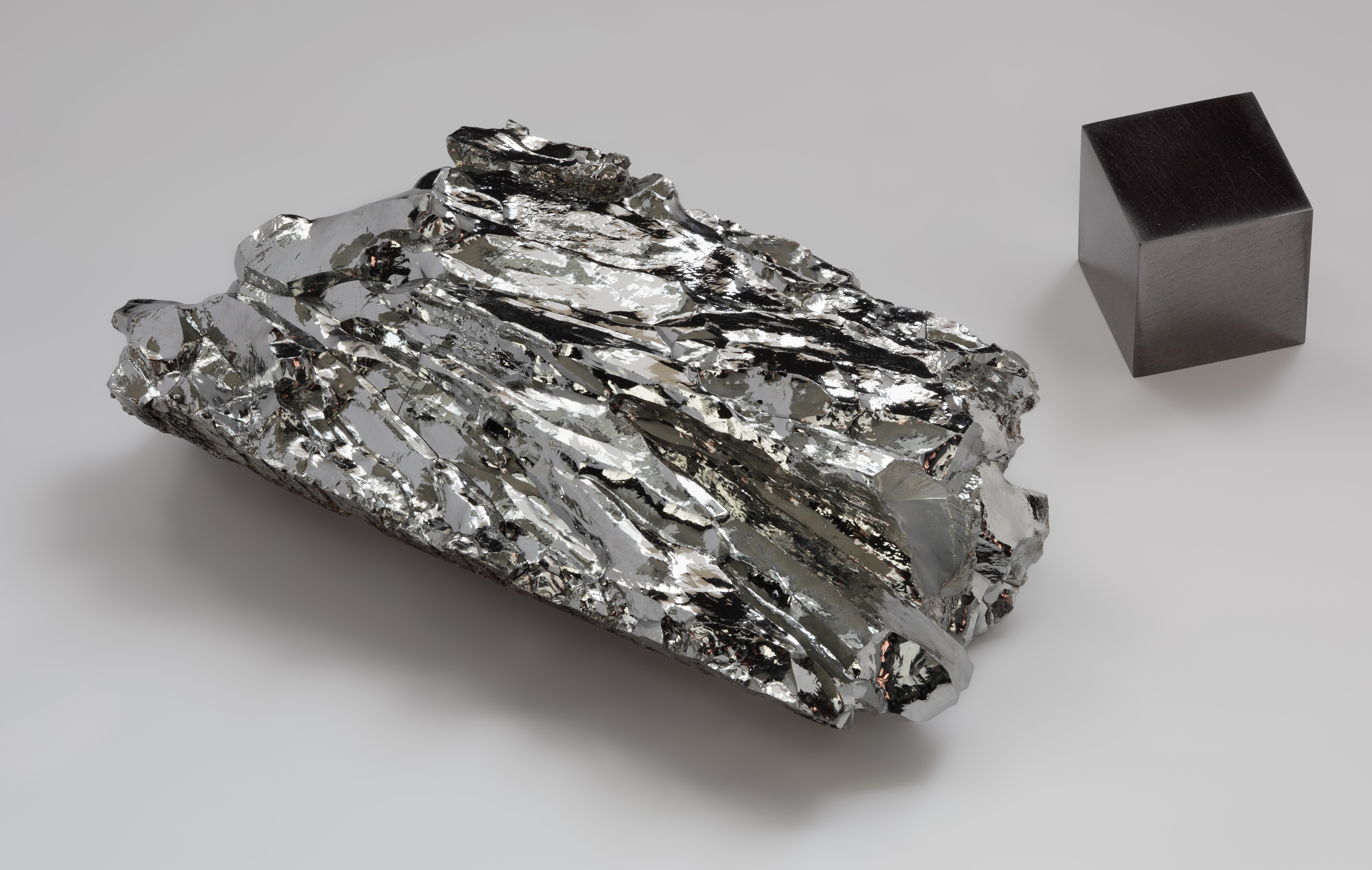
Molybdenum crystalline fragment and cube

Arthur Linz was an industrial chemist who specialized in the uses of molybdenum (element 42) and its compounds. He was vice-president of the Climax Molybdenum Company and a fellow of the American Institute of Chemists. He may have been involved in the nickel deposits found in Petsamo, northern Finland, in 1921.

In 1952, he and David H. Killeffer published Molybdenum Compounds, their Chemistry and Technology with a chapter from future Nobel Prize winner Linus Pauling on the structural chemistry of molybdenum. The authors complained that no satisfactory work had been written on the subject, the existing literature simply reiterating "everything published about the chemistry of the element, true and false, probable and fantastic." They aimed to remedy this by excluding the doubtful while still emphasizing the many exciting chemical possibilities of the element that Edgar Fahs Smith had described as "ambidextrous, bi-sexual and polygamous", but which had been overshadowed by its better-known metallurgical uses.

== Philately ==
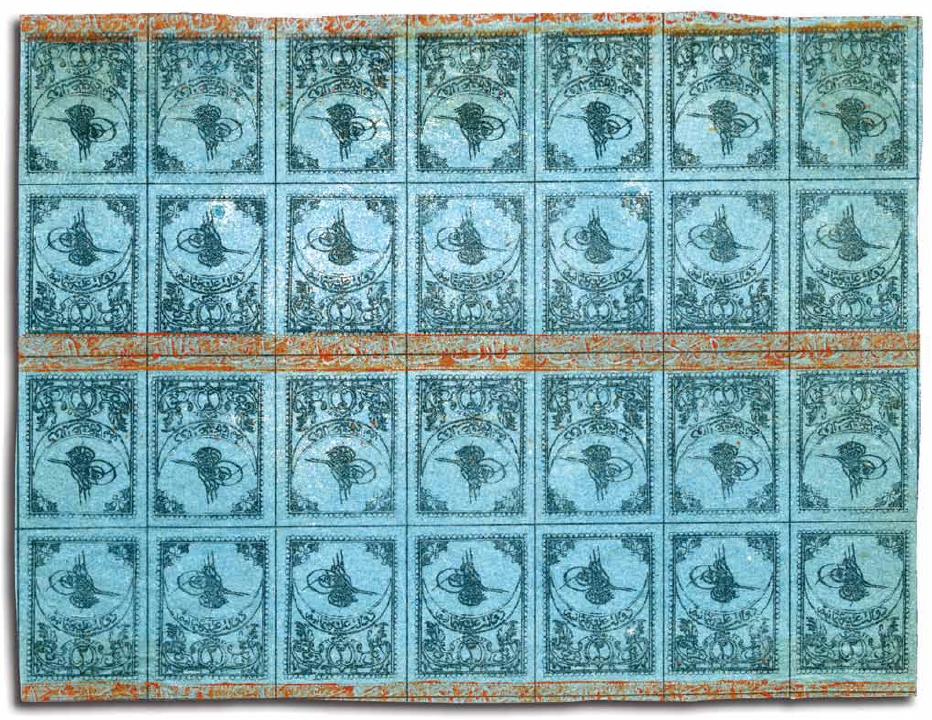
2pi black on blue-green tête-bêche "tughra" stamps of the Ottoman Empire with control band, formerly in the Linz collection.

Linz was a noted philatelist and philatelic author who formed leading collections of the stamps of Finland, Peru, and Turkey.

In 1935, he was one of the founders of the Finnish-American Stamp Club (later the Scandinavian Collectors Club) of which he was the president in 1940–1941. He was also a member of the Collectors Club of New York. He wrote articles on Finland and Peru in the annual Stamp Specialist series in the 1940s. In 1943 he sold his collection of Finland at Carl E. Pelander Auctions who described it as "Finland – The World's Foremost Collection, The Property of a Well-Known American Collector".

His collection of Peruvian stamps and postal history was acquired by Bernard Payton in the 1950s who donated it to the Smithsonian National Postal Museum in 1961. The collection is notable for its comprehensive coverage of classic issues such as the 1857 Pacific Steam Navigation Company stamps and material of the British postal agencies in Peru.

Towards the end of his life, Linz produced a series of articles on the stamps of Turkey for The London Philatelist. Among the items in his Turkish collection was a block of 2pi black on blue-green "tughra" tête-bêche stamps of the Ottoman Empire with control band which the firm of David Feldman SA has described as "arguably the most important Tughra item".

== Death and legacy ==
Linz died on March 29, 1961. He received obituaries in the Mercury Stamp Journal and Stamps. His collection of Austria & Lombardy-Venetia (1850 to 1876 issues) was sold at auction by the Mercury Stamp Company in October and November 1961 and much of his Turkish collection was acquired by Tevfik Kuyas.

== Selected publications ==
=== Chemistry ===
- Molybdenum Compounds, their Chemistry and Technology. Interscience Publishers, New York & London, 1952. (With D. H. Killeffer)
- "Industrial Applications of Molybdenum Chemistry – Introduction", Industrial & Engineering Chemistry, Vol. 47 (1955), No. 8, pp. 1492–1493.

=== Philately ===
- "Peru's Mystery Stamps Numbers One and Two", Stamps, April 11, 1942, pp. 43–44.
- "Stamps Issued by Order of the Government of Peru", Stamps, October 3, 1942, pp. 18–22.
- "Finland", The Stamp Specialist Yellow Book, 1942.
- "Early Foreign Mail Service From Peru", The Stamp Specialist Gray Book, 1943, pp. 81–91.
- "Peruvian Combination Covers", Stamps, August 5, 1944, p. 190.
- "The Early Postal History of Peru", The Stamp Specialist Coral Book, 1945, pp. 69–77.
- "The British Postal Service From Peru", The Stamp Specialist Mahogany Book, 1947, pp. 117–128.
- "A Discovery in 1860 Issue of Peru: Double Transfers", The Stamp Specialist Chartreuse Book, 1948, pp. 90–91.
- "The Stamps of Turkey", The London Philatelist, Vol. 63 (May 1954), pp. 79–83, 97–103, 126–130.

== See also ==
- Mehmet Ismet Başaran
