= Stephen Gottheil Rich =

- Born: 1890
- Died: August 10, 1958
- Organizations: Society of Philatelic Americans
- Known for: Created specialized collections of postage stamps; editor of The Precancel Bee
- Parent: Joseph S. Rich (father)
- Awards: APS Hall of Fame

Stephen Gottheil Rich (1890–1958) of New Jersey, was the son of Joseph S. Rich who helped found the Collectors Club of New York. Stephen Rich was an ardent stamp collector, and created some important specialized collections of stamps.

== Collecting interests ==
Rich had a wide interest in philately; but, he created award-winning specialized collections. His most widely regarded collection was his Orange Free State, the Boer War and the Cape of Good Hope Triangulars. He later wrote Philately of the Anglo-Boer War of 1895-1902 in 1943. Stephen Rich also collected postage stamps and postal history of France and Poland, postal history of the state of New Jersey, and U.S. Telegraph Stamps.

Rich also had a collection of pre-cancelled stamps and edited The Precancel Bee.

== Philatelic activity ==
Rich served as an officer in the Society of Philatelic Americans for a number of years.

== Honors and awards ==
Stephen Gottheil Rich was admitted to the American Philatelic Society Hall of Fame in 1959, the year after he died.

== See also ==
- Philately
- Philatelic literature
