= George Benedict Sloane =

American philatelist

- Born: April 3, 1898
- Died: July 15, 1958 (aged 60)
- Engineering career
- Projects: Expert on United States postage stamps; seller of famous stamp collections
- Awards: APS Hall of Fame

George Benedict Sloane (April 3, 1898 – July 15, 1958), of New York City, was a noted philatelic dealer and auctioneer. He was also a popular writer of philatelic articles.

== Collecting interests ==
Sloane had varied interests in collecting, but is recognized for his study of United States city local carrier stamps and creating a reference collections of locals showing counterfeits, fakes, cinderellas, forgeries and imitations of these rare city postage stamps.

== Philatelic literature ==
Sloane was responsible for reviewing the famous Bureau issues and his Bureau plate number collection of philatelist Walter R. McCoy and recording a description of it. He also wrote articles in Stamps magazine, where he contributed over a thousand articles since the magazine’s inception. A total of 1350 of these articles were published in 1961 in a volume entitled Sloane's Column.

== Philatelic sales ==
Sloane was an expert of United States philatelic matter. He was chosen as a dealer and auctioneer for the sale of famous collections, such as those of Col. Max G. Johl, Beverly Sedgwick King, and Senator Joseph Sherman Frelinghuysen, Sr. of New Jersey. Sloane was also chosen as an advisor on the sale of collections of President Franklin D. Roosevelt and Alfred H. Caspary.

== Honors and awards ==
Sloane was named to the American Philatelic Society Hall of Fame in 1962.

== See also ==
- Philately
- Philatelic literature
