= Stanley Bryan Ashbrook =

- Born: October 10, 1882
- Died: January 23, 1958 (aged 75)
- Engineering career
- Projects: Famous for his studies and publications on early United States classic stamps and covers
- Awards: Crawford Medal; APS Hall of Fame; Luff Award

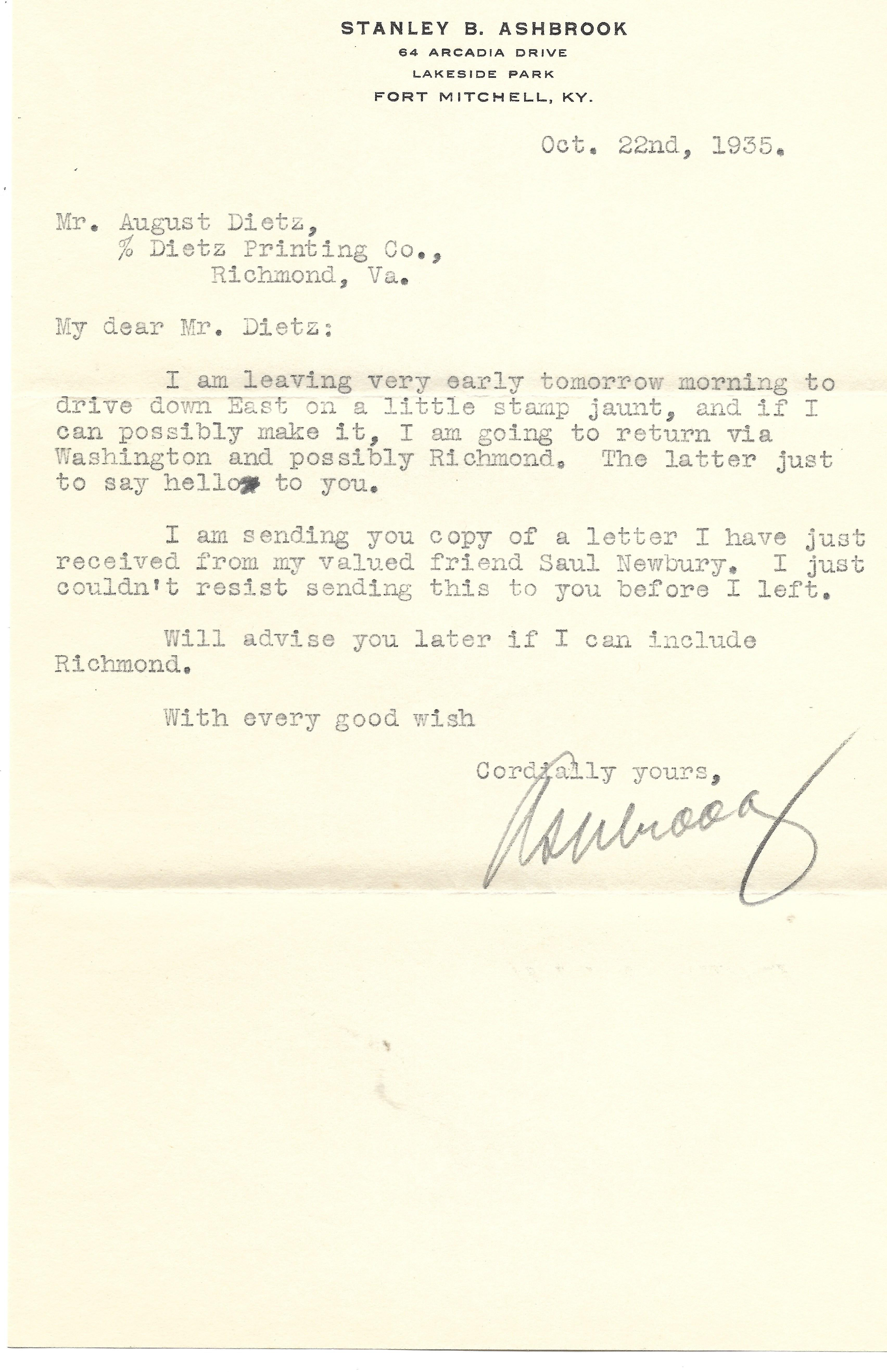
1935 letter

Stanley Bryan Ashbrook (October 10, 1882 – January 23, 1958), of Kentucky, was a distinguished American philatelist who was known for his extensive studies of early United States stamps and postal history. He was usually known as Stanley B. Ashbrook.

== Collecting interests ==
Ashbrook was primarily interested in classic United States stamps and postal history in the form of stamped covers.

== Philatelic activity ==
Ashbrook is most known for his famous two-volume book entitled The United States One Cent Stamp of 1851-57 which was published in 1938. His research of early American postage stamps led him to author the book The United States Ten Cent Stamp of 1855-57 in 1936 for which he received the Crawford Medal in 1937.

Ashbrook published the "Ashbrook Special Service" as a private subscriber series and also contributed to another subscriber series entitled "Bulletins of the Research Group."

== Honors and awards ==
Stanley Ashbrook received numerous honors and awards for his philatelic research and subsequent publications. These include, the first-issued Luff Award, the Crawford Medal, and signed the Roll of Distinguished Philatelists in 1950. He is currently listed in the APS Hall of Fame.

== Legacy ==
His philatelic estate, which included classic American postage stamps, postal history, unpublished notes, and other material was sold in 1958 at auction by the firm of H. R. Harmer.

== See also ==
- Philatelic literature

== References and sources ==
Sources

- Stanley Bryan Ashbrook at the APS Hall of Fame.
