= Chicago Philatelic Society =

American philatelic organization

- Purpose: beginner to advanced
- Location: United States
- Origins: Chicago Stamp Collectors Union
- Region served: Chicago, Illinois, area
- Method: speakers and presentations
- Key people: club president
- Revenue: membership
- Holds annual Chicagopex philatelic show

The Chicago Philatelic Society is one of the oldest philatelic organizations in the United States, serving stamp collectors and postal history enthusiasts in the Chicago, Illinois, area.

== History ==
The society was founded October 8, 1886. Its predecessor was the Chicago Stamp Collectors Union established a few years earlier, in December 1884. It has the distinction of being Chapter One of the American Philatelic Society because of its long and continuous service to philately.

== Meeting location ==
Monthly meetings of the Chicago Philatelic Society are conducted on the third Thursdays, from 7 p.m. to 9 p.m. at the Harold Washington Library at 400 S. State Street on the third floor. Meetings feature speakers, presentations and society business.

== Chicagopex ==
Each year in November, the society holds the Chicagopex philatelic show, which features exhibits of stamps and postal history, a banquet, 75 to 80 stamp dealers, a youth booth, the USPS and UNPA booths and stamp collectors and visitors from around the nation. The show also features guest speakers and meetings of various clubs that are open to the public. The show has no admission charge and offers free parking. In recent years, the show has taken place at the Westin Chicago Northwest Hotel in Itasca.
