= 1930s in air cargo =

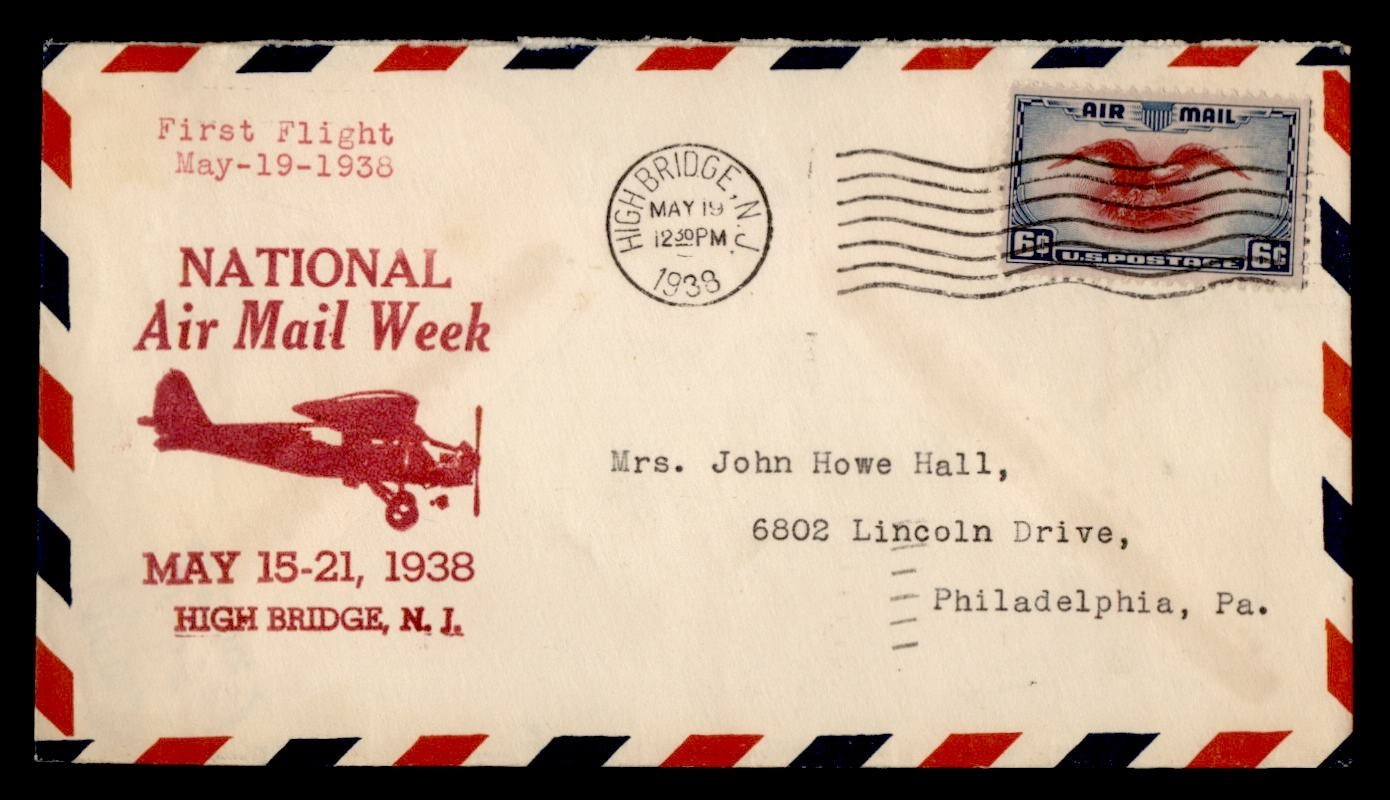
1938 First flight - U.S. National Airmail Week - High Bridge NJ TO Newark - COVER front

This is a list of air cargo, airmail and airlift related events as well as a summary for the decade 1930–1939.

== Overview ==
=== Civil developments ===
Major network carriers (Imperial Airways in the UK, Pan Am in the Americas) were actively expanding long-range routes and flying-boat operations around 1930–1931. These expansions increased the volume and geographical reach of airmail and small-parcel freight.

Also in this decade, experiment with sending mail by rocket took place in various forms in various countries.

By 1930 worldwide domestic airmail contracts formed a large share of early airline income (in many markets the airmail contract business model was stabilising airlines and incentivising larger transport types). This economic dependence on mail contracts was central to how air cargo/logistics developed in the inter-war years.

In the United States alone, the total commercial air cargo volume had surpassed 4 million pounds (1.8 million kilograms) a year by 1931. By 1931, approximately 85 percent of U.S. airline revenue derived from domestic airmail contracts, while passenger services accounted for about 14.8 percent and freight operations contributed only 0.2 percent. The Contract Air Mail (CAM) routes established by the U.S. Post Office were therefore critical to the early viability of commercial aviation in the United States; without this postal support structure, the sector's development would have been significantly constrained. The 'Air Mail scandal' of 1933/1934 reshaped the structure of the U.S. airline industry by breaking up monopolistic holdings, shifting emphasis away from mail-dependency toward diversified passenger/cargo services, and triggering modernization in both commercial aviation and military air transport.

=== Military developments ===
Following the now successfully developed parachute, in the early 1930s, Russia led the way in experimenting with mass drops of armed soldiers. Japan, Germany and Italy, and later also the U.S., France and Great Britain followed and pioneered with their own airborne forces.

The United States, as the first country to do so in the world, from 1931 started to centrally organize their military air freight activities in the United States Army Air Corps.

In Europe, by the mid-1930s the growth of Germany's Luftwaffe and concurrent aircraft production (notably the Junkers Ju 52 transport), enabled early execution of large scale military transport in the Spanish airlift of 1936, assisted by the Italian air force, signalling the development of air mobility and logistical capabilities that later became central to large-scale offensive airborne and transport operations in World War II.

== Events ==
=== 1930 ===
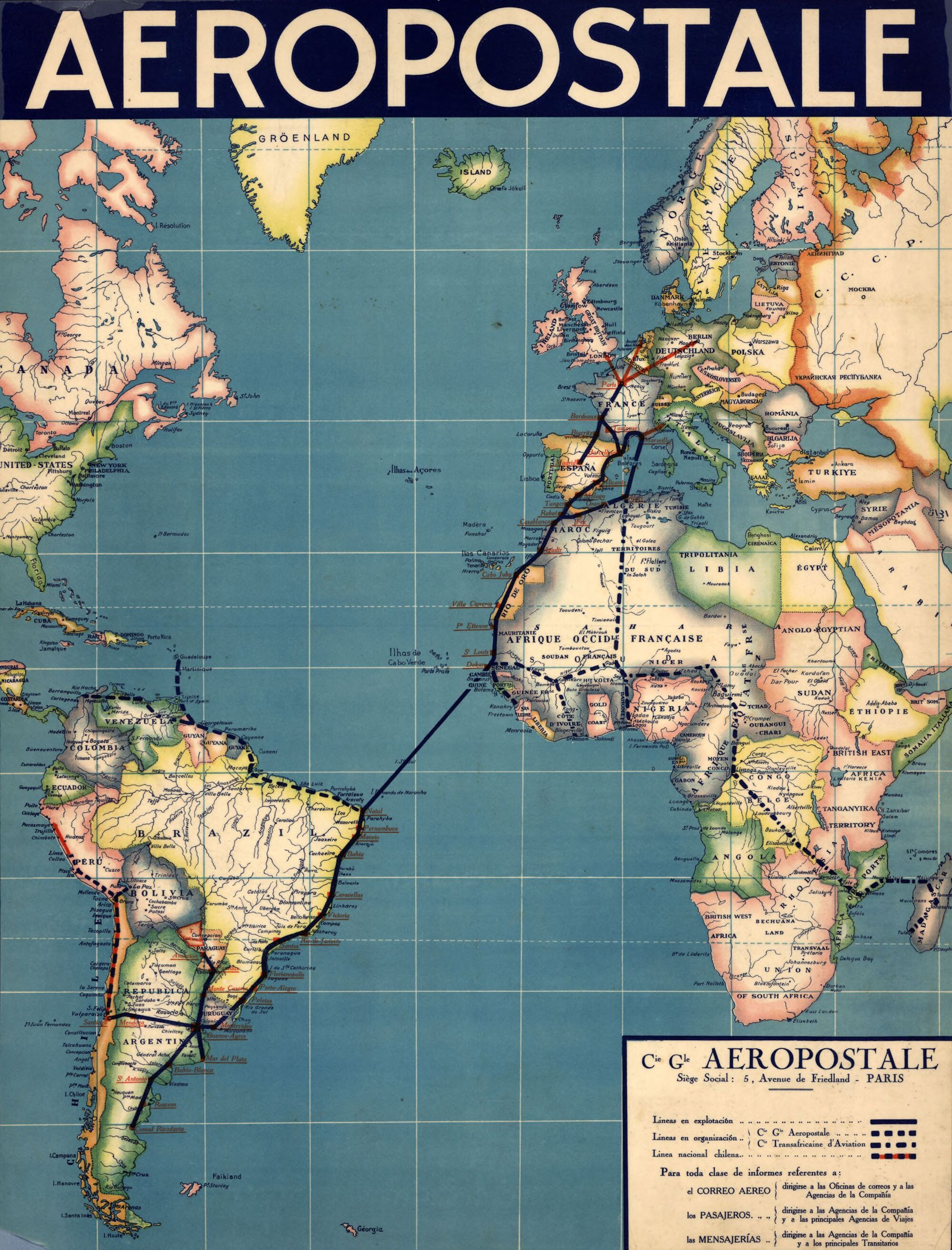
Aeropostale (espagnol) – affiche – btv1b10104641p

- May 12–13 – (France / South Atlantic) The world's first nonstop commercial flight across the South Atlantic Ocean by the French pilot Jean Mermoz, flying for Aéropostale from Dakar, Senegal, to Natal, Brazil in the float-equipped Latécoère 28-3 mail plane Comte de la Vaulx. The 3,058-kilometer (1,900-mile) flight takes 19 hours 35 minutes, and the plane carries 122 kilograms (269 pounds) of mail. On the return flight, Mermoz is forced to ditch Comte de la Vaux at sea; although he, his two companions, and the mail are saved, the aircraft sinks and is lost.
- June 13 – (France / Andes) Making his 92nd crossing of the Andes carrying mail between Argentina and Chile for Aéropostale, French aviator Henri Guillaumet crashes his Potez 25 in bad weather at Laguna del Diamante near Mendoza, Argentina. He walks through three mountain passes before reaching a village and safety on June 19.
- October 9–10 – (Canada / North Atlantic) First flight from North America (Harbour Grace, NL) to England by a Canadian pilot Capt. J. Erroll Boyd (1891–1960), in the Wright-Bellanca WB-2 Maple Leaf (aka, Columbia), navigated by the American Lieut. Harry Connor. This flight was also notable for transporting mail bearing a surcharged stamp as a commemorative overprint.
- October 25 – (United States) Inauguration of the final transcontinental Contract Air Mail route (CAM-34) for the United States airmail service. The coast-to-coast CAM network was completed with the launch of CAM-34 (between New York City and Los Angeles) on 25 October 1930, marking the consolidation of transcontinental airmail service under contract carriers and signalling the maturity of U.S. commercial mail routes. This completed the system of 34 CAM routes established between 1926 and 1930.

=== 1931 ===
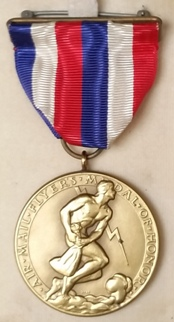
Airmail Flyers' Medal of Honor

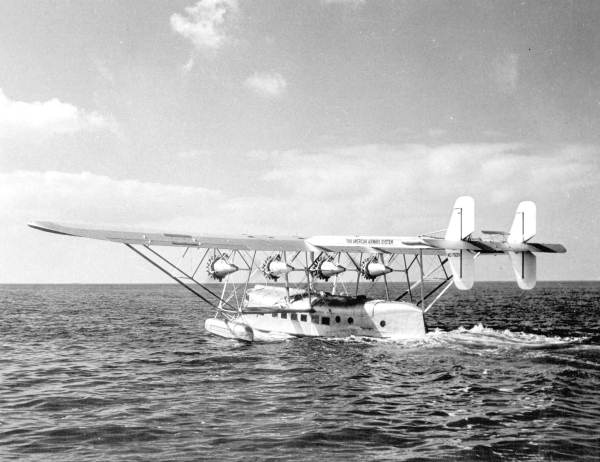
Sikorsky S-40 NC-752V Southern Clipper on water.

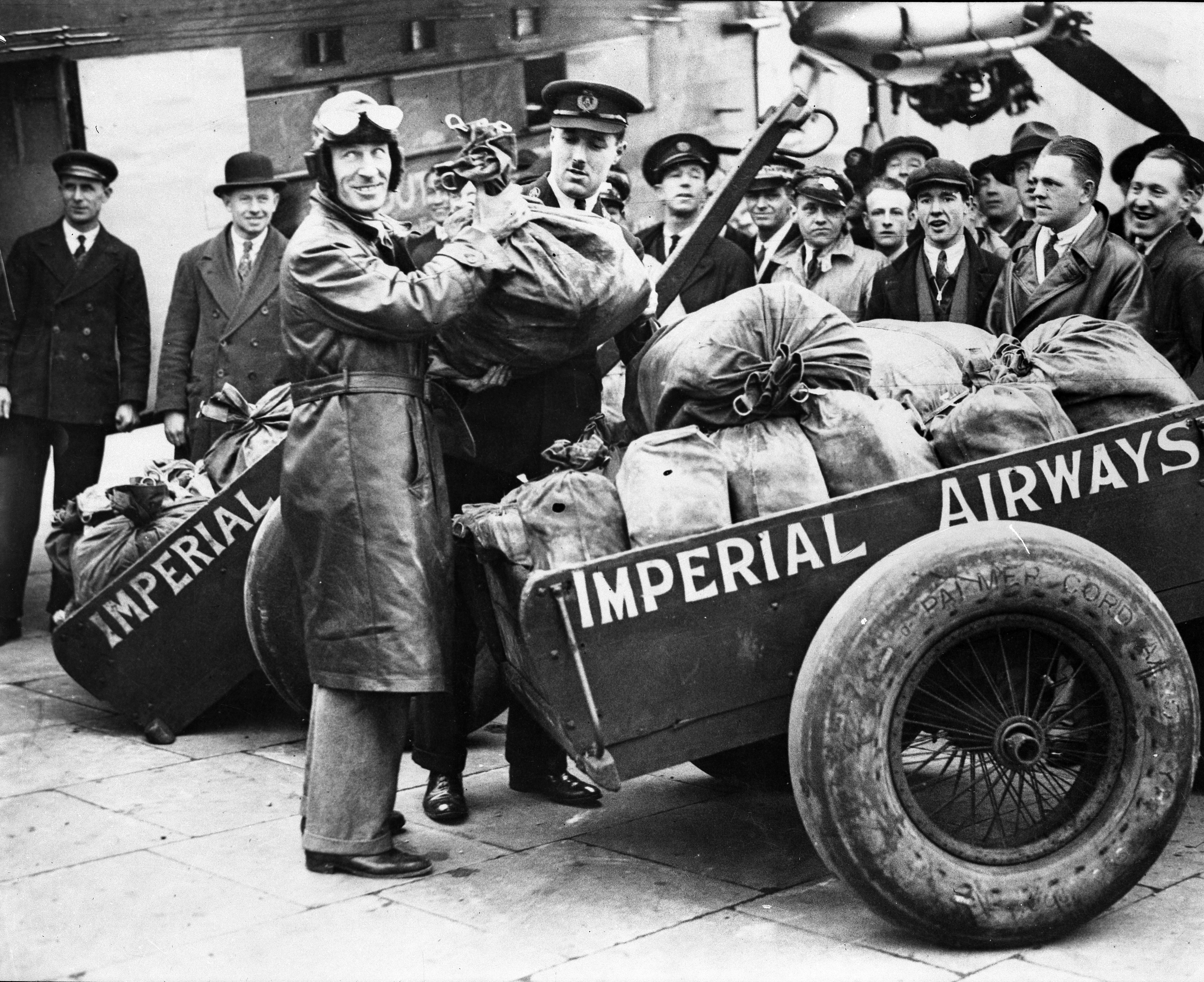
Charles Kingsford Smith on arrival at Croydon, England, with some of the fifty thousand letters of the first Christmas airmail from Australia to England, c 1931

- Undated – (Soviet Union) After a number of experimental military mass parachute jumps starting from 2 August 1930, the regular Soviet Airborne Troops were established as early as 1931.
- Undated – (United States) The Army Air Corps experimented with the systematic use of air transport for distributing aviation supplies.
- January – (Vietnam-France) Air Orient starts a Saigon–Marseille service, first on a fortnightly basis, but from July 1 on a weekly basis.
- February – (France / Algeria) Flying from Oran in French Algeria, the French aviators Antoine Paillard and Louis Mailloux fly a 15-kilometer (9.3-mile) circuit for over 50 hours in the Bernard 80 GR in an attempt to set a new unrefueled nonstop closed-circuit world distance record. They cover 8,168 kilometers (5,075 miles) before higher-than-expected fuel consumption forces them to land only 20 kilometers (12 miles) short of the record.
- February 14 – (United States) The United States Congress authorizes a new award, the Airmail Flyers' Medal of Honor, which the President of the United States is to award to pilots who perform distinguished service in connection with U.S. Air Mail service. It will first be awarded in December 1933.
- February 19 – (Czechoslovakia) On its way from the Netherlands to the Dutch East Indies, the KLM Ooievaar aircraft made an emergency landing, after which its 227 kg of mail was transported to Vienna and forwarded to its destination by a replacement plane, the PH-AEZ Zwaluw.
- February 28 – (United Kingdom-Africa) Imperial Airways starts expansion into Africa beginning with a regular London-Tanganyika Territory (now Tanzania) service.
- April 15 – (Germany) Rocket mail experiments: near Dümmer/Osnabrück, German engineer Reinhold Tiling launched a rocket carrying ~188 postcards.
- April–May – (Australia – England) First experimental Australia to England return airmail by Imperial Airways (mail left Melbourne 23 Apr, routed via Darwin, Timor, Batavia, Singapore, India and on to Croydon in mid-May).
- August 6 – (United States) Transcontinental and Western Air inaugurates the first air cargo service in the United States with a shipment of livestock from St. Louis, Missouri, to Newark, New Jersey.
- November 19 – (United States) Pan Am introduced the Sikorsky S-40 "American Clipper" on its extended Latin American passenger & mail routes. The first flight being Miami-Kingston-Barranquilla).
- December 6 – the KLM Fokker F.VII Ooievaar that crashed in Bangkok was carrying an unusually large load of 250kg mail. 183 kg was recovered and later transported to Amsterdam by another aircraft, though two bags were lost, making the salvaged "crash mail" highly valuable to collectors nowadays.
- December 9 – (United Kingdom-Africa) The Imperial Airways' service for Central Africa was extended experimentally to Cape Town for the carriage of Christmas mail. The aircraft used on the last sector, DH66 G-AARY City of Karachi arrived in Cape Town on 21 December 1931.

=== 1932 ===
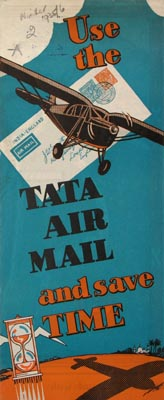
Tata Sons' Airline Timetable, Winter 1935–36

- Undated – (United States) The Army Air Corps established a provisional 1st Air Transport Group with four squadrons, to each serve one of four major air depots distributing parts to Army airbases as well as between the depots. The group existed until 1937.
- Undated – (Austria) Rocket mail experiments: Friedrich Schmiedl launched his first Experimental Rocket 7 (V-7) with 102 pieces of mail between the Austrian towns of Schöckl and St. Radegund.
- January 20 – (United Kingdom-Africa) Imperial Airways further expands into Africa with a regular flight to Cape Town.
- April 1 – (United States) Pan Am announced substantial per-pound rate reductions to stimulate freight traffic; an early, deliberate commercial move to grow air cargo demand.
- May 20–21 – (United States) Amelia Earhart’s solo trans-Atlantic flight, carrying 50 'unofficial' pieces of mail. Earhart became the first woman to fly solo across the Atlantic.
- June 7 – (Hong Kong-Vietnam-France) Air Orient connects Hong Kong to the Saigon – Marseille service, first as a trial, but from August 3 on a regular basis. ‘Great Britain & Irish Free State’ were connected via the Paris to London Imperial Airways route.
- June 24 – (Soviet Union) Leningrad's Shosseynaya Airport (the future Pulkovo Airport) opens. Its first flight, an aircraft carrying passengers and mail, arrives late in the afternoon after a two-hour-and-a-half-hour flight from Moscow.
- September – (Bolivia / Paraguay) The Chaco War was the first South American war with extensive use of aircraft for military supply drops and direct logistical support.
- October 15 – (India) Tata Airlines, founded by J. R. D. Tata opens an airmail route between Karachi and Madras, the first regular air service within India and origin of Air India.
- October 22 – (Ireland-Germany) First Ireland to Continental European airmail connection / first Irish passenger-airmail combo service from Oranmore, Galway to Berlin flying a De Havilland Fox Moth.

=== 1933 ===
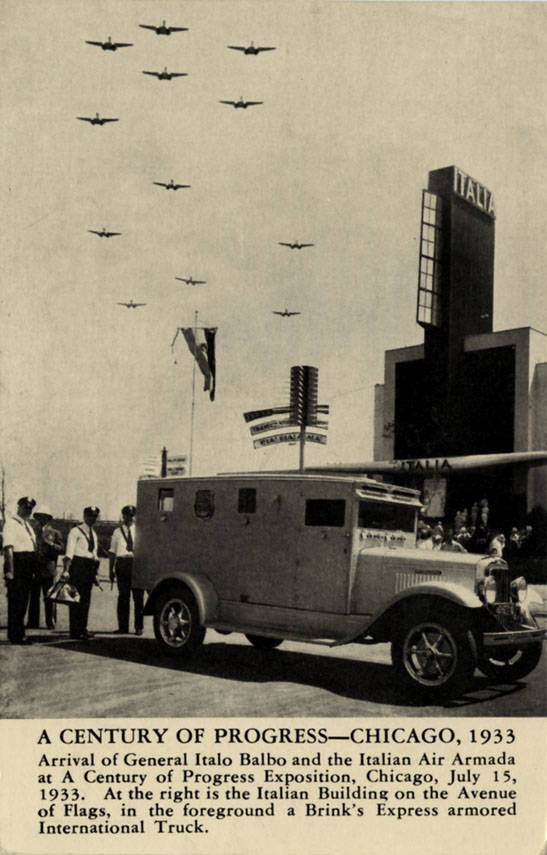
Arrival of General Italo Balbo and his Italian Air Armada in Chicago, July 15, 1933

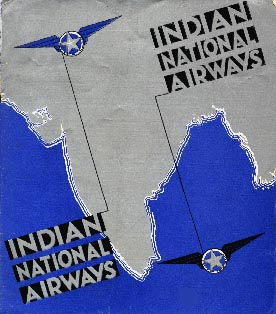
Indian National Airways timetable cover as used in 1933

- Undated – (United Kingdom) The concept of an Empire Air Mail Scheme emerged in 1933, proposing that all first-class correspondence within the British Empire be transported by air at a uniform rate of 1½d per half-ounce, with postcards carried for a penny.
- May 29 – (UK–Australia) An Imperial Airways England to Australia survey flight took off, operated by Imperial Airways Armstrong Whitworth Atalanta G-ABTL Astraea. Major H. G. Brackley, Imperial Airways' Air Superintendent, was in charge of the flight.
- July 1 –
  - (Italy–United States) Start of Italo Balbo’s mass transatlantic "air armada" flying from Rome to Chicago, a high-profile demonstration flight that carried some 3500 cards and special mail/philatelic covers. The Regia Aeronautica's squadron of 24 (originally 25) Savoia-Marchetti S.55 flying-boats led by Italo Balbo arrived at Chicago's Century of Progress Exposition at July 15. The flight generated special commemorative airmail issues and massive public attention, a diplomatic/propaganda event that also highlighted long-distance airmail possibilities.
  - (United Kingdom-Asia) Imperial Airways extended the London–Karachi route to Calcutta.
- August – (Japan) A night mail route started, flying a Nakajima P-1 connecting Tokyo, Osaka, and Fukuoka.
- September 23 – (UK–Asia) Imperial Airways further expands into Asia with a service London to Rangoon.
- September 28 – Jun 12, 1934 – (United States) The 'Air Mail scandal', also known as the 'Air Mail fiasco', was a political controversy that erupted in 1934 following a congressional investigation into the awarding of airmail contracts to select airlines. The scandal intensified when the U.S. government revoked these contracts and assigned mail delivery to the largely unprepared and under-equipped U.S. Army Air Corps (USAAC) per February 19, leading to disastrous consequences: 66 major accidents, ten of them with fatalities, resulted in 13 crew deaths, creating an intense public furor.
- December – (India) Indian National Airways starts with weekly passenger and freight services from Calcutta to Rangoon and Dhaka. It later also started a weekly service between Karachi and Lahore, a feeder service for Imperial Airways.
- December 9 – (UK–Asia) Imperial Airways further expands into Asia with a service from London to Singapore.
- December 13 – (United States) President Franklin D. Roosevelt makes Northwest Airways pilot Mal Freeburg the first recipient of the Airmail Flyers' Medal of Honor.
- December 18-22 – (Netherlands - Dutch East Indies) The KLM aircraft Pelikaan completed a record-breaking return flight carrying Christmas mail between Amsterdam and Batavia in just over four days each way, far faster than the usual nine days, demonstrating the speed and viability of regular airline service for long-distance air mail.

=== 1934 ===
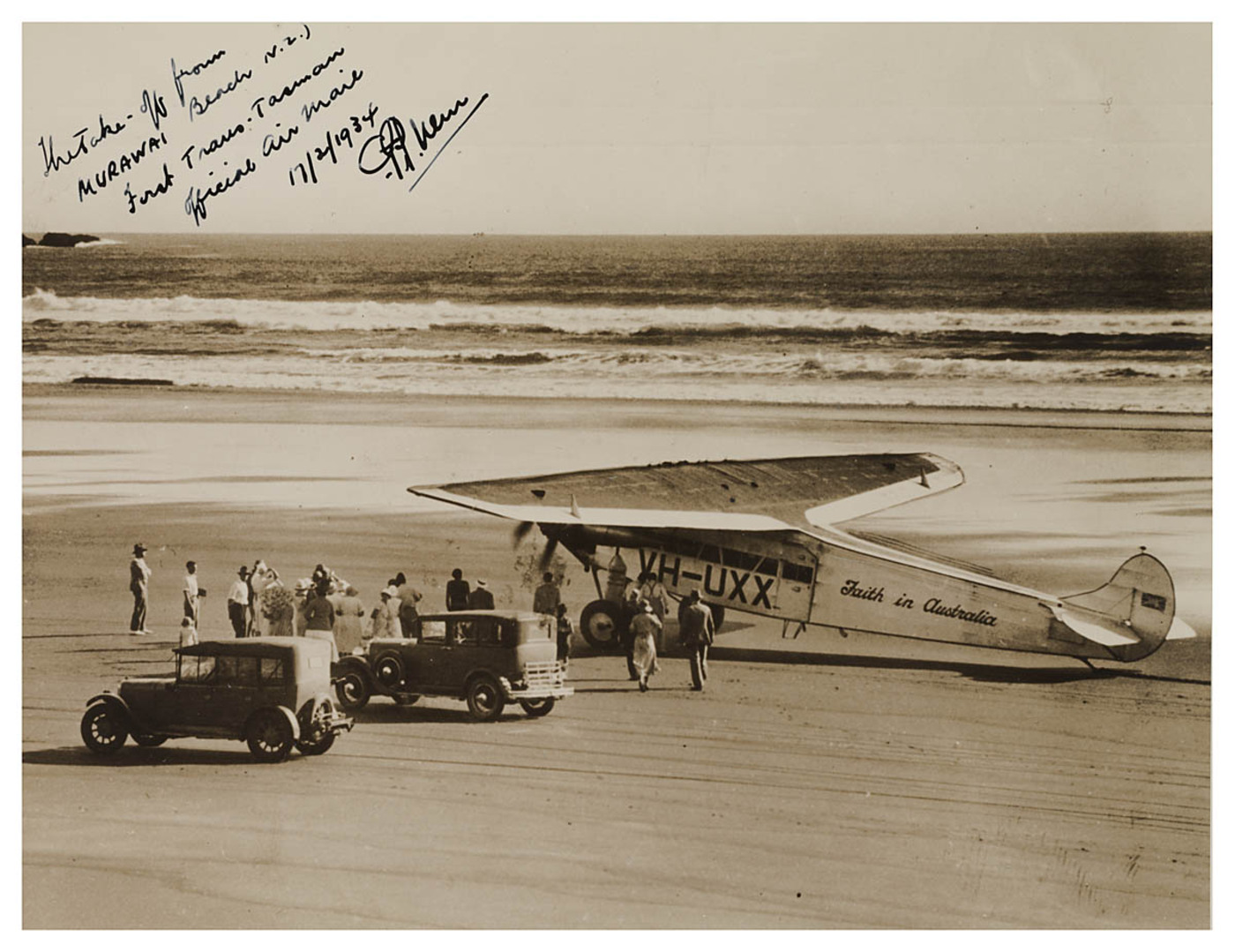
Faith in Australia on the beach at Murawai ready for take-off with First Official (return?) Airmail from N.Z. to Australia, February 17, 1934

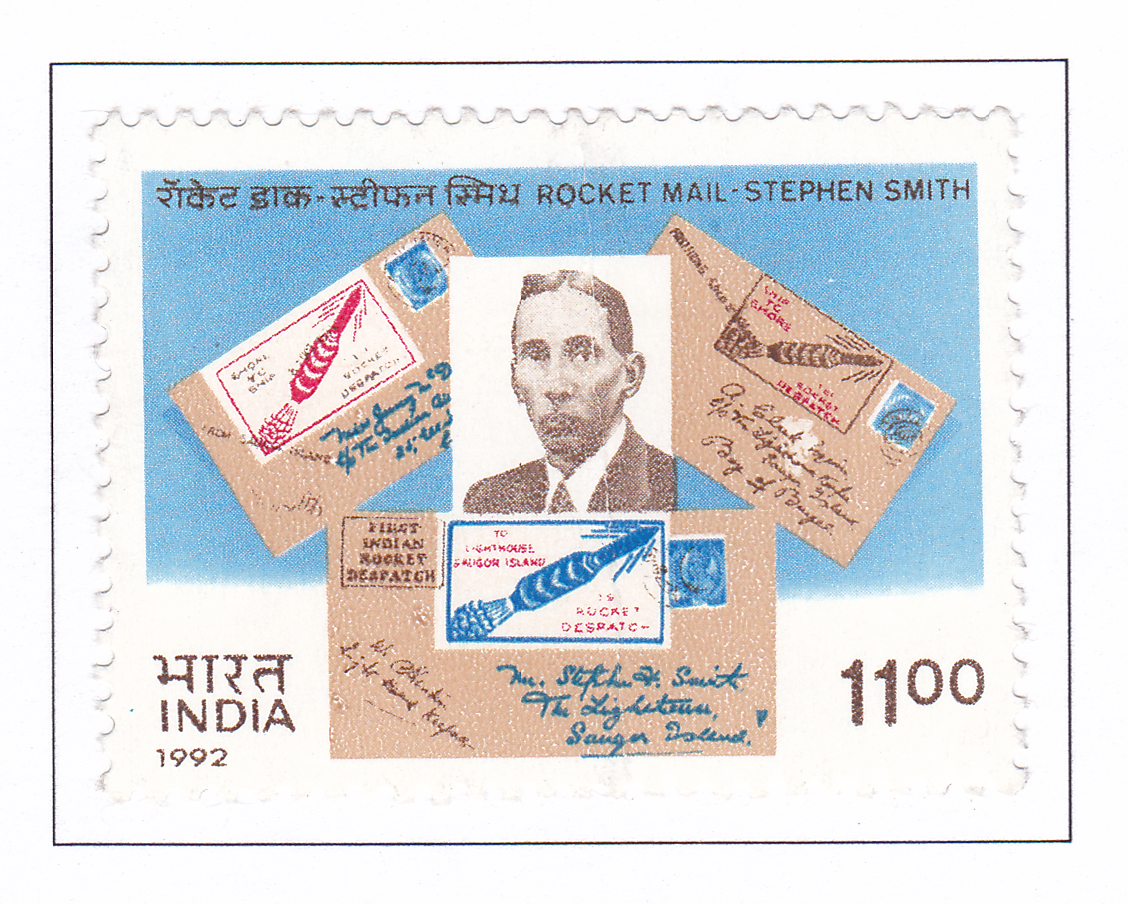
commemorative postage stamp on ROCKET MAIL-STEPHEN SMITH issued by India Post. Date of Issue: 19 December 1992 Denomination: ₹11.00

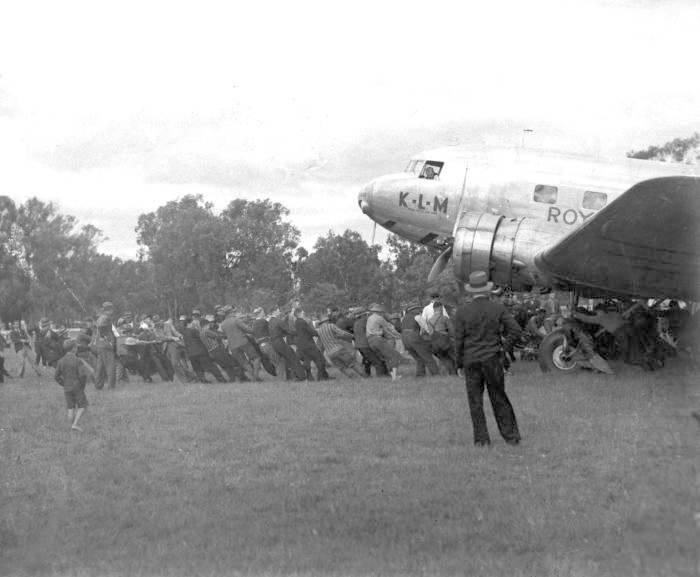
KLM DC-2 airliner Uiver being pulled from the mud by volunteers at Albury Racecourse, 24 October 1934

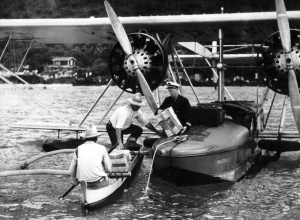
Inter-Island Airways Captain Elliott unloading a Sikorsky S-38 on the bay at Kona, Hawaii

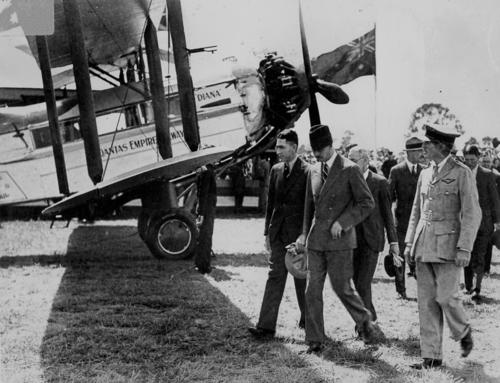
HRH the Duke of Gloucester farewells the inaugural Qantas service which linked up with Imperial Airways at Singapore to provide Australia's first regular airmail link with the United Kingdom. On the Duke's right is the airline's managing director, Hudson Fysh and on his left is Flight Superintendent Lester Brain (who piloted the first flight). The aircraft followed a 44 stop route with the airmail arriving in London 12 days later.

- Undated – (United States) Delta Air Lines is awarded Air Mail Route 24 by the U.S. Post Office and begins operating as Delta Air Lines.
- February 3 – (Germany-Brazil) Deutsche Luft Hansa begins the first regular airmail service across the Atlantic Ocean, between Berlin and Rio de Janeiro.
- February 7
  - (Australia–New Zealand) The first airmail flight between Australia and New Zealand is made by Charles Ulm in an Avro Ten, taking 14 hours 10 minutes.
  - (Germany / Africa–South America) Germany begins a regular air mail service between Africa and South America, employing Dornier flying boats catapulted from depot ships. Dornier Do 26s will later fly the route without the assistance of ships, and various Dornier flying boats will complete over 300 crossings before the outbreak of World War II brings the service to an end in 1939.
- February 9 – (United States) President Franklin D. Roosevelt suspends all U.S. Air Mail contracts due to alleged improprieties by the Hoover Administration during the negotiations of those contracts.
- February 19 – (United States) The United States Army Air Corps begins flying U.S. airmail in the wake of President Roosevelt's cancellation of all U.S. Air Mail contracts.
- February 26 – (United States) In the first week of U.S. Army Air Corps delivery of U.S. Air Mail, five Army aviators have been killed in accidents. The death rate highlights the lack of training of most U.S. Army pilots in night and bad-weather flying.
- May 7 – (United States) U.S. Army Air Corps delivery of U.S. Air Mail comes to an end. During the 78 days of delivering air mail, 12 Army air crew have died in 66 accidents. The losses convince U.S. Army officials of the need to train their pilots in flying at night and in bad weather.
- May 28 – (France / South Atlantic) French Couzinet 71 flying boats begin the first regular air mail service across the South Atlantic Ocean.
- May 29 – (United Kingdom) Highland Airways commences the first regular airmail service within the United Kingdom, between Inverness and Kirkwall
- June 12 – (United States) As a result of the 'Air Mail scandal', the Air Mail Act of 1934 becomes active, closely regulating the contracting of air mail services and prohibits aircraft manufacturers from owning airlines.
- August – (United States) Pan Am and Railway Express Agency (REA) sign a contract where REA's 23.000 service points in the U.S. are connected with Pan Am's worldwide network. A combined air waybill, the Pan American Airways document, is developed for this service, replacing dozens of documents previously used for international air transport.
- August 16 – (United States) Pan Am puts the Sikorsky S-42 into service on Pan Am's Latin American routes out of Miami.
- August 20 – (United Kingdom) Introduction of the first U.K. inland airmail service, connecting major cities including London, Birmingham, Manchester, Liverpool, Cardiff, Belfast, and Glasgow. Initially launched as an experimental operation, the service continued until the outbreak of World War II.
- September 30 – (India) Rocket mail experiments: first attempt to send mail (143 letters) from ship to shore off Saugor Island. Rocket exploded in flight.
- October – (Netherlands / England–Australia) KLM entered its first DC-2, registered PH-AJU and named Uiver (Stork), in the October 1934 MacRobertson Air Race between London and Melbourne. It finished second of the twenty entrants, behind the purpose-built de Havilland DH.88 racer Grosvenor House (race time 70 hours 54 minutes), and nearly three hours ahead of the Boeing 247D. During the total journey time of 90 hours 13 minutes, it was in the air for 81 hours 10 minutes. It won the handicap section of the race, as although the DH.88 had finished first in the handicap section, the regulations allowed the crew to claim only one victory. It flew KLM's regular 9,000-mile (14,500 km) route (a thousand miles longer than the official race route), carrying airmail, making every scheduled passenger stop, turning back once to pick up a stranded passenger, and became lost in a thunderstorm and briefly stuck in the mud after a diversionary landing at the Albury race course on the last leg of the journey.
- October 8 – (United States) Inter-Island Airways makes the first interisland air mail flight in the Hawaiian Islands under a United States Post Office contract.
- October 14 – (United States) National Airlines begins operations, using two-second-hand Ryan ST monoplanes to fly a mail contract service in Florida between St. Petersburg and Daytona Beach with stops at Tampa, Lakeland, and Orlando.
- November 6 – (Germany) The Deutsche Reichsbahn-Gesellschaft Junkers Ju 52/3mge D-AVAN, flying a domestic cargo flight in Germany from Königsberg Devau Airport in Königsberg, East Prussia, to Berlin Tempelhof Airport in Berlin, crashes while attempting an emergency landing at Gross-Rackitt in Pommern, killing all five people on board.
- December 8 – (United Kingdom–Australia) Imperial Airways begins an airmail service from London to Brisbane, with Qantas responsible for the Singapore to Brisbane sector. At the time, the journey of 12,700 miles (20,400 km) was the world's longest air route, taking around 12 days.
- December 20 – (Netherlands / Iraq) During a flight from Almaza Airport outside Cairo, Egypt, to Baghdad, Iraq – one leg of a Christmas mail-and-passenger flight from Schiphol Airport in Amsterdam, the Netherlands, to Batavia in the Netherlands East Indies which prior to Cairo had made stops in Marseille, France; Rome, Italy; and Athens, Greece – the KLM Royal Dutch Airlines Douglas DC-2-115A Uiver (registration PH-AJU) crashes near Rutbah Wells, Iraq, during a rainstorm and bursts into flames, killing all seven people on board.

=== 1935 ===
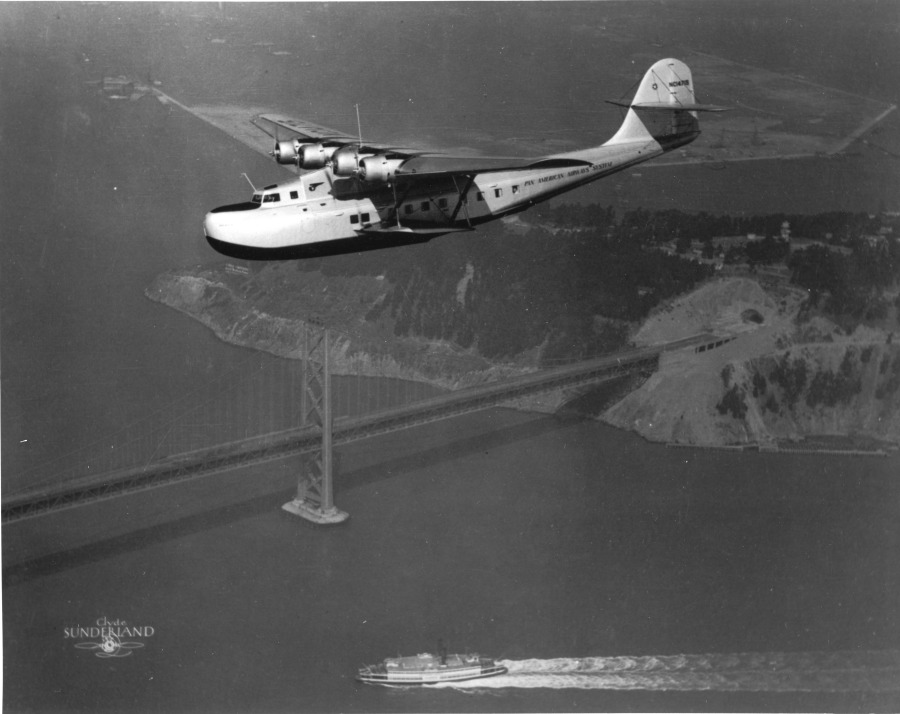
PanAm Martin M-130 NC14715 over San Francisco

- January 26 – (United Kingdom) During a mail flight, a Hillman's Airways de Havilland Dragon Rapide, registration G-ACPO, crashes in bad weather at Derbyhaven on the Isle of Man.
- July 17 – (Iran) 1935 Bushehr KLM Douglas DC-2 crash: The aircraft carried 116 kg of mail, of which only 25 kg was salvaged and later forwarded in special official envelopes, now considered rare and valuable by philatelists.
- November 22 – (United States) Pan American World Airways commences both the first regular transpacific air service to Hawaii and the first transpacific airmail service, flying the Martin M-130 flying boat China Clipper from Alameda, California, to Manila, where it arrives on 29 November after overnight stops at Honolulu, Midway Atoll, Wake Island, and Sumay, Guam. The aircraft carries more than 110,000 pieces of mail. Among its crew are pilot Edwin C. Musick and navigator Fred Noonan.

=== 1936 ===
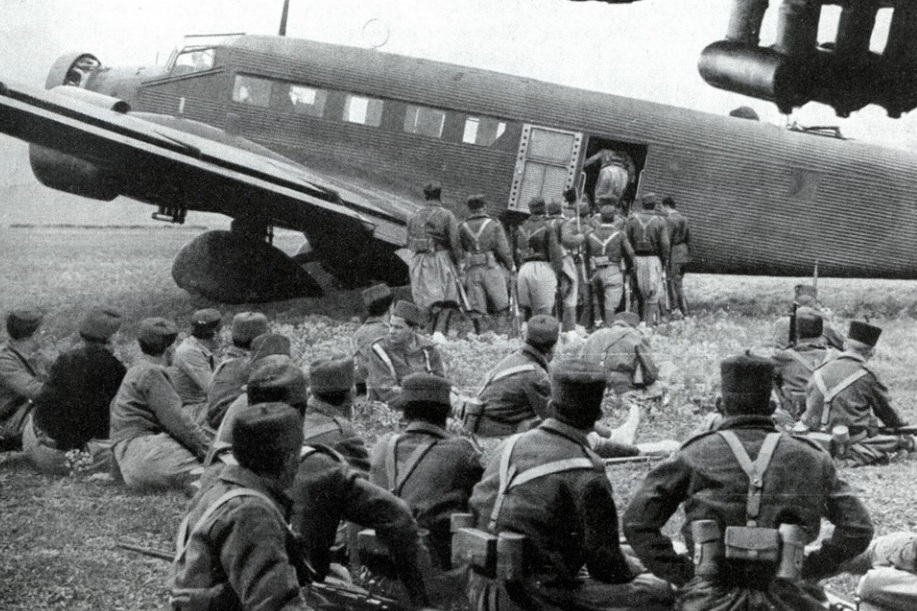
Moroccan troops boarding Ju-52, most likely during the airlift to Spain in the summer of 1936.

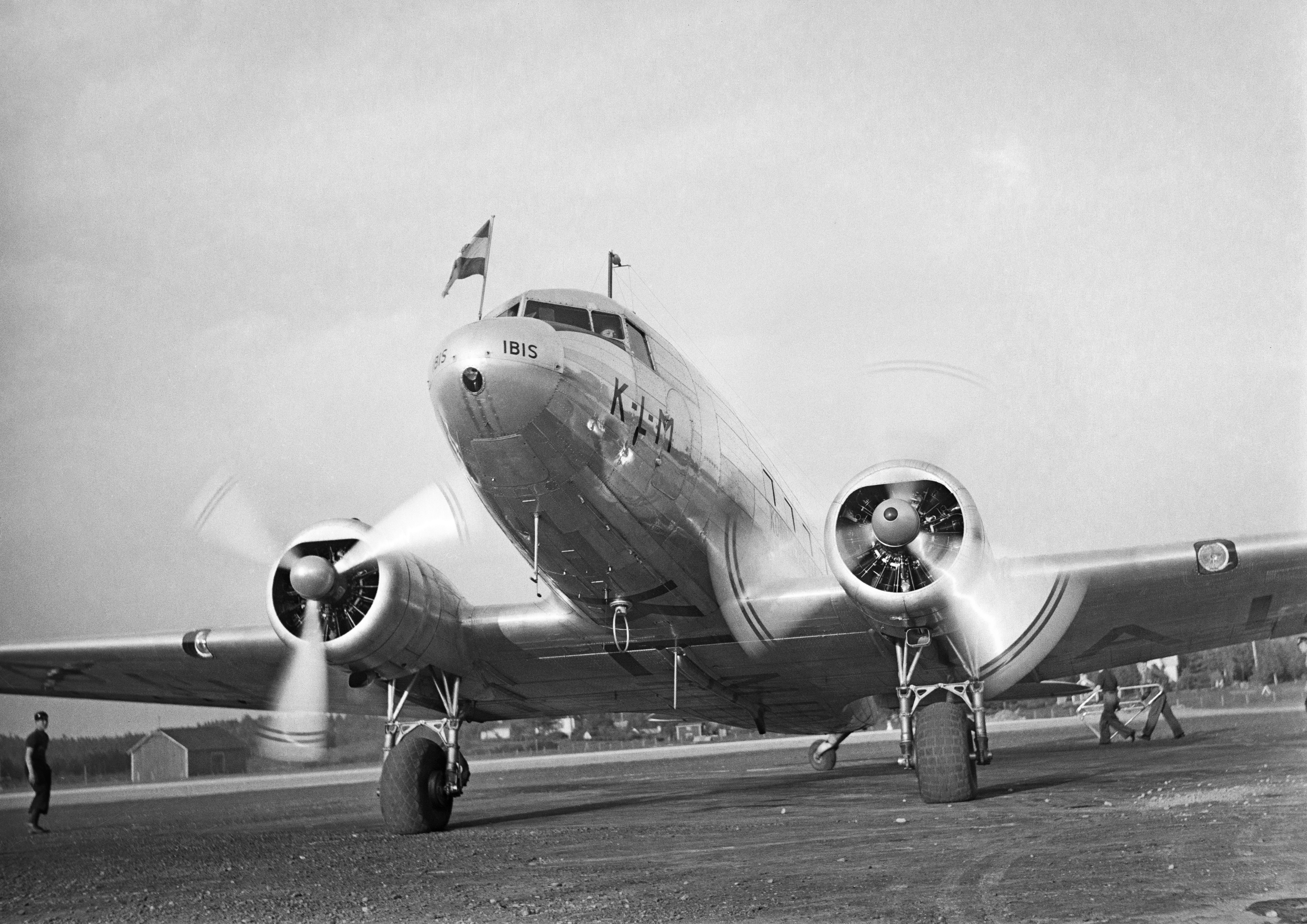
A KLM Douglas DC-3-194, named Ibis, on Malmi Airfield in Helsinki July 1, 1939.

- February 9 – (United Kingdom–Africa) Imperial Airways opens a trans-Africa route between Khartoum and Kano in Nigeria. This route was extended to Lagos on October 15.
- February 23 – (United States) Rocket mail experiments: first successful deliveries of mail by a rocket when two rocket airplanes that were launched from the New York side of the frozen Greenwood Lake landed on the New Jersey side, less than 100 yards away.
- March 4 – (Germany) The zeppelin LZ 129 Hindenburg had its maiden flight and started North Atlantic passenger/mail services in May 1936, carrying substantial quantities of souvenir and regular airmail on the Europe–US and Europe–South America runs that year. Airships still played a role in high-value/long-range mail in the mid-1930s
- March 14 – (UK–Hong Kong) Imperial Airways starts its first mail service to Hong Kong. The mail service, and later the passenger service, from London to Hong Kong connected with the London-Australia branch at Penang. The mail leaving London on 14 March 1936 was connected with the first flight in Penang on March 23, following the establishment of a branch from Penang to Hong Kong.
- June 26 – (United States) Douglas DC-3 begins commercial service with American Airlines.
- July–October – (Spain) The world's first long-range combat airlift was the Spanish airlift of 1936, a mission named Operation Magic Fire (German: Feuerzauber). Nazi German Luftwaffe Ju 52 and Fascist Italian Regia Aeronautica Savoia-Marchetti SM.81 were used by the Spanish Nationalist Air Force to transport Army of Africa troops from Spanish Morocco to the Spanish mainland at the beginning of the Spanish Civil War. During this airlift, German transport planes were moved to Spain from Germany via San Remo in Italy. By 11 October, the mission's official end, 13,500 troops, 127 machine guns and 36 field guns had been carried into Spain from Morocco.
- July 21 – (United States) Following Pan Am's design competition for the first transoceanic airliner for their passenger/mail routes, the airline accepted Boeing's (delayed) proposal for what would become the Boeing 314 Clipper, awarding it a $4.8 million contract for six aircraft with an option for six more. This order represented the first that Pan American had placed with the company. The first aircraft was to be delivered by December 21, 1937. An amendment to the contract on January 20, 1937, granted a three-month extension to the specified delivery date for the first six aircraft.
- September 11 – (Netherlands) KLM received its first Douglas DC-3s and used them on its long Amsterdam–Batavia (Jakarta) services, improving reliability and payload on one of the era's longest scheduled routes.
- December 9 – (United Kingdom) 1936 KLM Croydon accident: Only a few extremely rare letters from the mail carried by the aircraft were salvaged.

=== 1937 ===
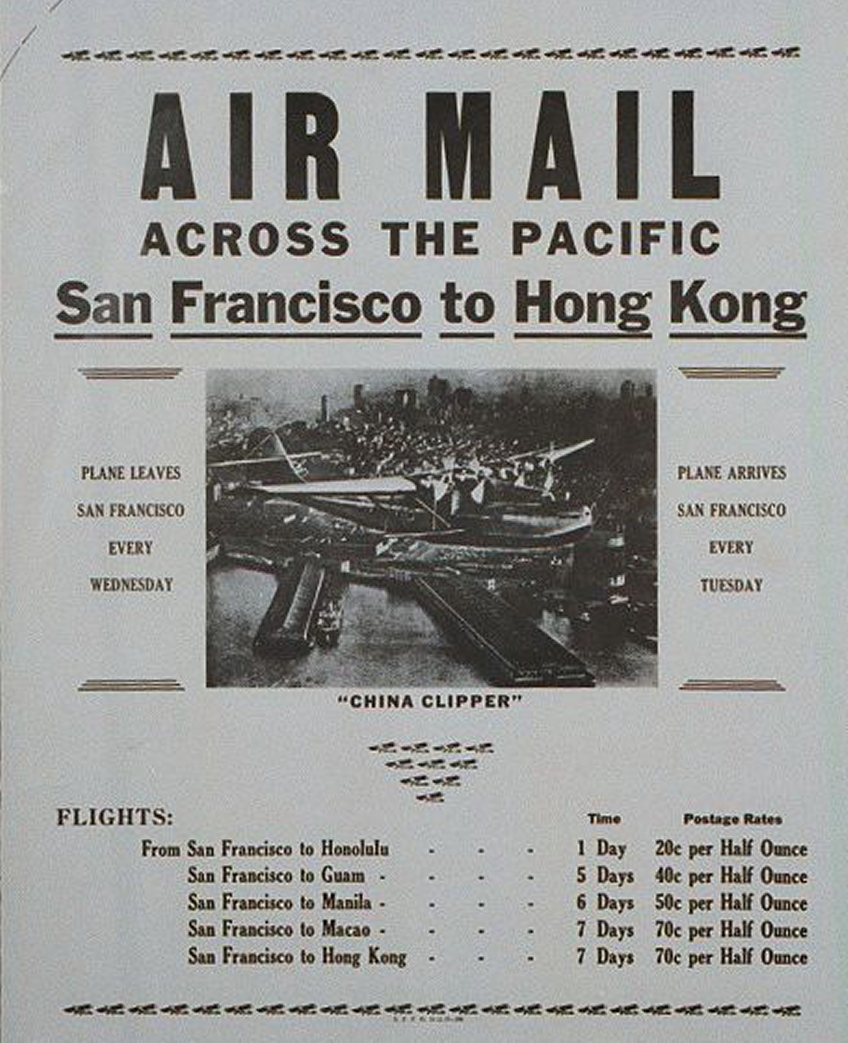
Air Mail Across the Pacific – Pan Am's China Clipper started regular trans-Pacific service between San Francisco and Hong Kong in April 1937, carrying passengers and air mail.

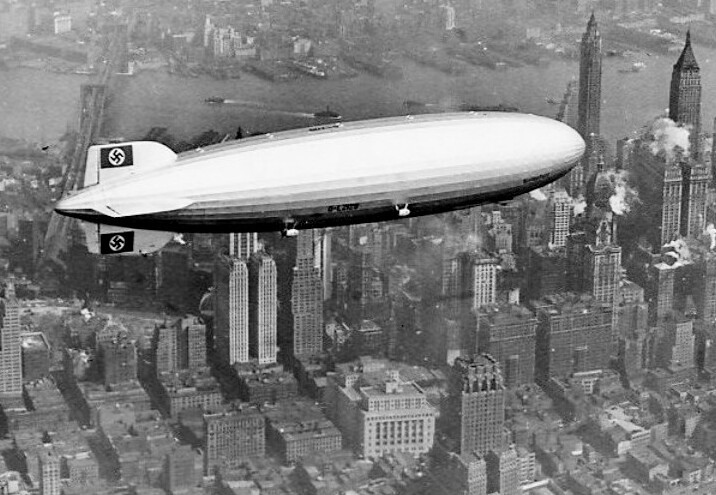
Photo of the Hindenburg over New York City, May 6, 1937, shortly before it caught fire and crashed

- March 28 – (Australia) Taking off in thick fog from Archerfield, Queensland, Australia, for an early-morning mail and newspaper flight, the Airlines of Australia Stinson Model A Lismore (registration VH-UGG) crashes into trees, lands inverted, and explodes, killing its two-man crew.
- April 21–28 – (United States–Hong Kong) Pan American Airways' China Clipper completes the first trans-Pacific commercial passenger/airmail crossing to Hong Kong. Pan Am's Martin M-130 Clippers had already inaugurated trans-Pacific airmail in 1935; by 1937 the M-130s were operating regular trans-Pacific passenger/airmail services and in April 1937 the China Clipper reached Hong Kong on a high-profile transpacific trip.
- May 6 – (Germany / United States) Hindenburg disaster (LZ-129) at Lakehurst, New Jersey. The fiery loss of the Hindenburg shattered public confidence in hydrogen-filled rigid airships and effectively ended the era when zeppelins formed an important element of long-distance airmail and cargo routes. Hundreds of pieces of mail survived and are preserved as postal artifacts.
- June 28 – (British Malaya) Wearne's Air Service begins scheduled passenger, charter and airmail / freight services in British Malaya, flying a de Havilland Dragon Rapide aircraft named Governor Raffles from Singapore to Kuala Lumpur and Penang.
- June 16 – (Germany / United States) Imperial Airways’ Short S.23 Cavalier flying boat inaugurates a new trans-Atlantic/Empire airmail leg from Hamilton, Bermuda to New York City flight carrying mail.
- June 28 – (United Kingdom) The British Empire's Empire Air Mail Scheme, in which Imperial Airways carries all first-class mail by air, begins its first service, with the departure of the flying boat Centurion from Southampton on the initial route to South Africa, flying via Alexandria, Egypt. A planned expansion proceeded in phases: services to India and Malaya commenced in February 1938, followed by the extension to Australia in July 1938. Conceived as a long-term, 15-year programme to provide low-cost airmail links throughout the British Empire, the service was disrupted by the outbreak of the Second World War and ultimately discontinued on 31 March 1947.
- July 28 – (Belgium) 1937 Beert KLM Douglas DC-2 crash: The aircraft carried only 5 kg of mail bound for France, and the heavily damaged items were delivered to recipients with special French postal markings, making this crash mail highly sought after and valuable among philatelists.
- October 7 – (Dutch East Indies) 1937 KLM Douglas DC-3 Palembang crash: Most of the 400 kg of mail carried by the aircraft was salvaged and forwarded by another aircraft, though a small amount was destroyed by fire and some water-damaged mailbags were held back to dry before delivery.
- August 24 – (Spain) The Republicans launch an offensive against Nationalist in forces in Aragon, supported by about 200 aircraft; the opposing Nationalists have only 15 Heinkels. The Nationalists redeploy 20 Fiat CR.32 fighters commanded by the ace Joaquín García Morato, 20 Savoia-Marchetti SM.79 bombers, and 20 cargo aircraft from northern Spain to the area to bolster the defense.

=== 1938 ===
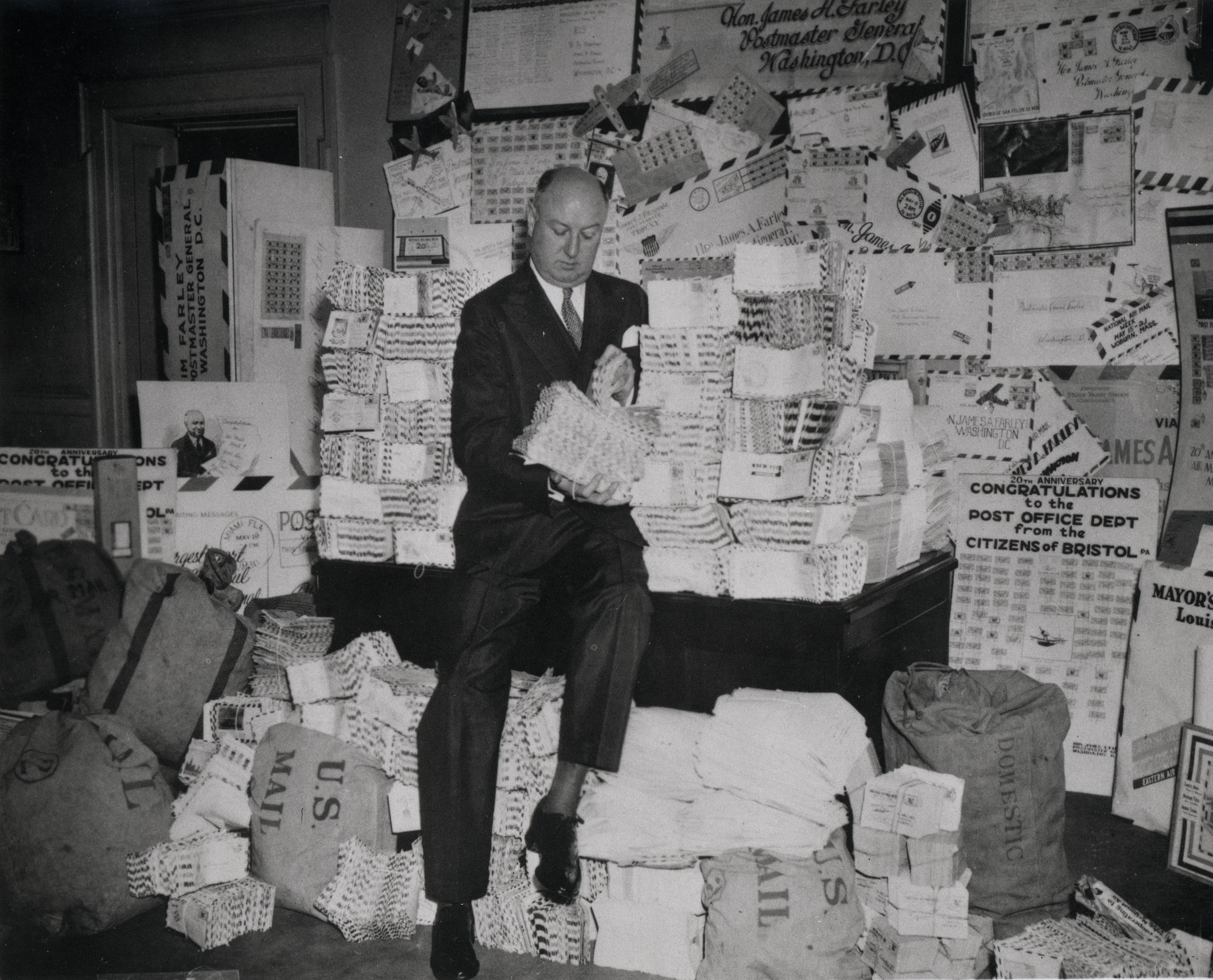
Postmaster General James A. Farley During National Air Mail Week, 1938

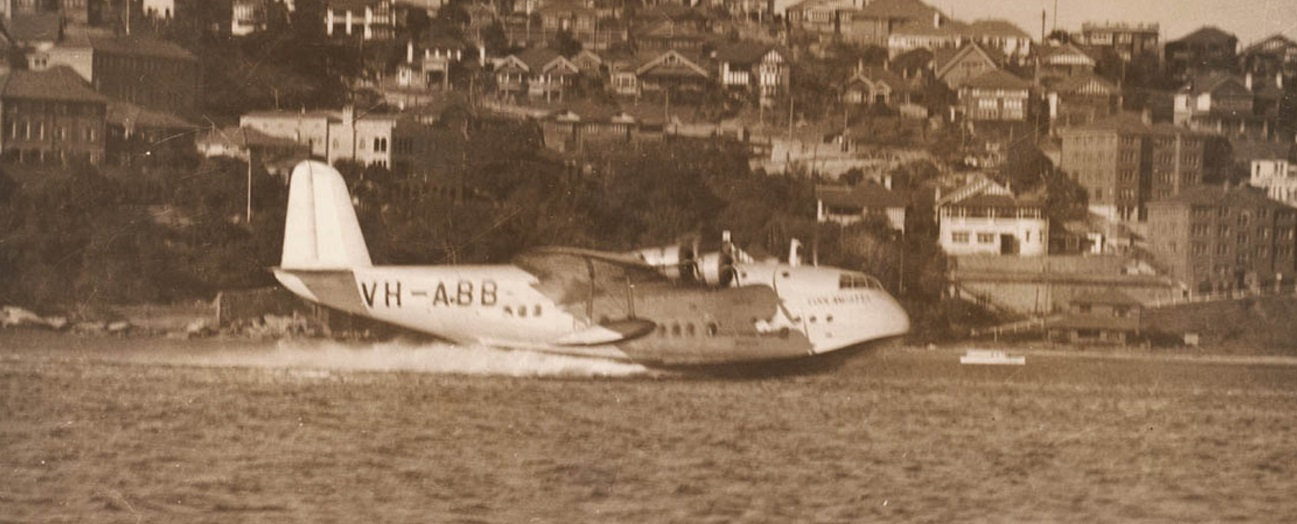
Qantas S.23 Empire class flying boat Coolangatta landing at Rose Bay, Sydney 1938. This aircraft was the second Empire boat to be specifically intended to operate the Singapore – Brisbane sector of the Empire mail route from England to Australia.

- Undated – (India) Indian National Airways along with Tata Airlines was awarded another government contract in 1938 under the Empire Air Mail Scheme for carrying first class mail on the Karachi–Lahore and Karachi–Colombo routes for a period of ten years . This was a major boost for aviation in India, as this contract promised a minimum income along with an operating subsidy.
- May 15–21 – (United States) National Air Mail Week in the U.S. was a major publicity push to expand public use of airmail and support struggling airlines. The U.S. Post Office issued a new 6¢ airmail stamp and mounted country-wide promotions; the event generated a sharp short-term increase in airmail volumes and visibility for air postal services.
- July 3 – (Dutch East Indies–Australia) KNILM began operations to Sydney, stopping at Darwin, Cloncurry and Charleville.
- July 28 – (United Kingdom) The British Empire's Empire Air Mail Scheme, in which Imperial Airways and Qantas carry all first-class mail by air, begins service to Australia via Singapore; Short Empire flying boats are used throughout.

=== 1939 ===
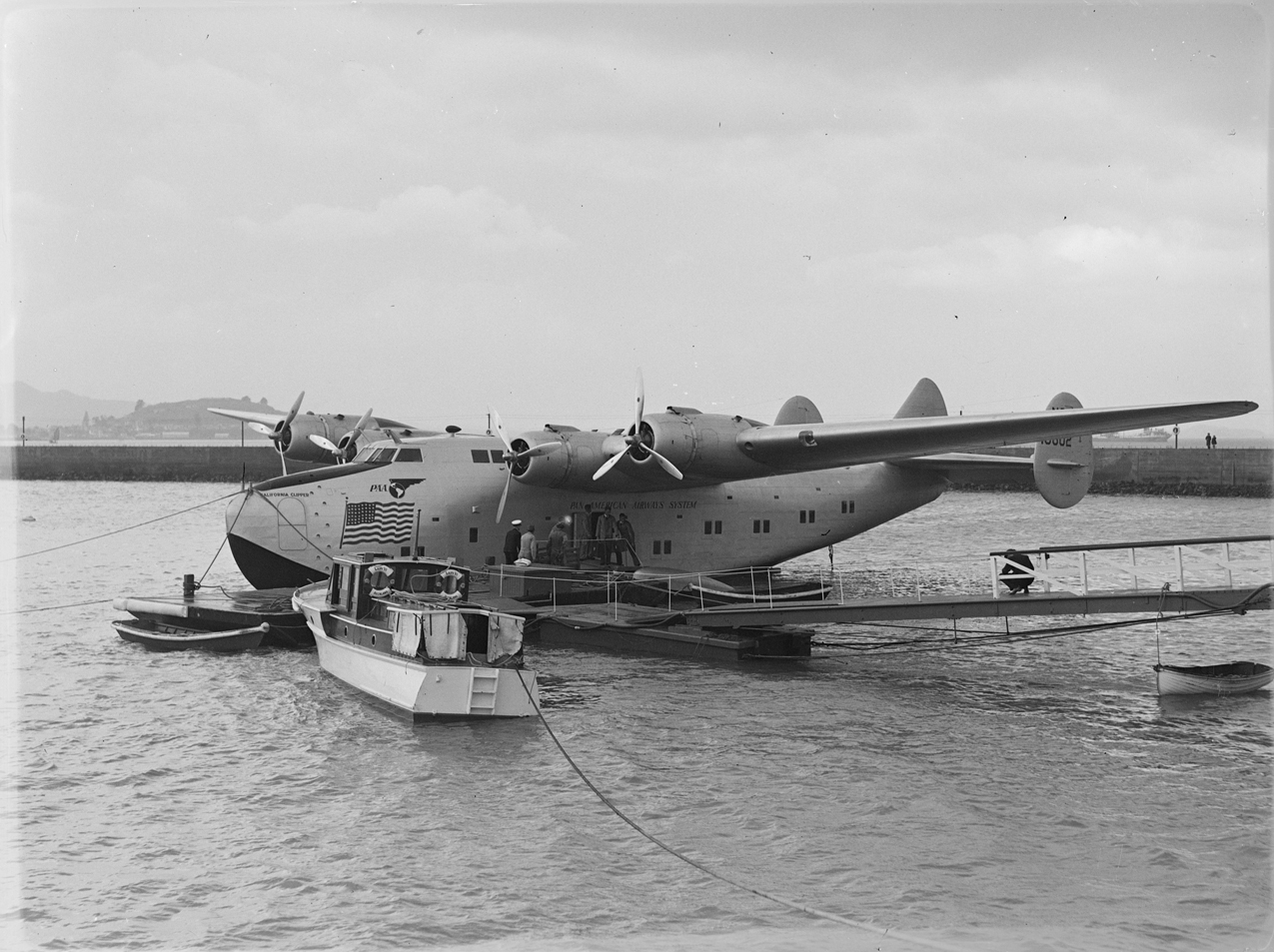
PanAm Boeing 314 California Clipper on the water, 1939

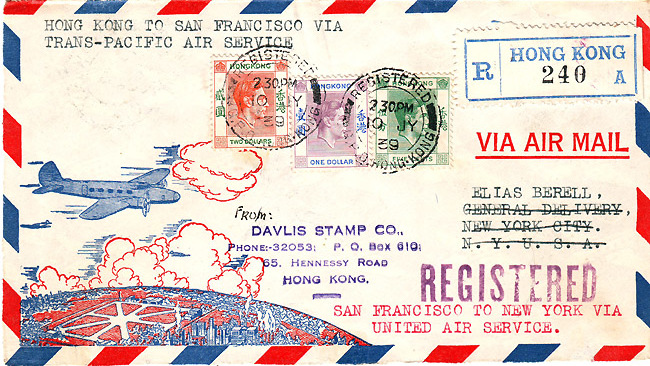
Three-panel flown "triptych" cover carried around the world (New York–Shediac–Botwood–Foynes–Southampton–Cairo–Karachi–Singapore–Hong Kong–Manila–Guam–Wake I.-Midway I.-Honolulu–San Francisco–New York) via PAA (Boeing 314 Clipper) and Imperial Airways (Short S23) including FAM 18 (Northern Route) First Flight, June 24 – July 28, 1939

- Undated – (United States) In addition to the internal air supply of spare parts, the Army Air Corps started to also supply aircraft factories, with government-supplied equipment and other items critical in the expanding production of bomber and fighter planes.
- February 23 – March 3 – (United States-Hong Kong) Pan Am Boeing Model 314 flying boat California Clipper inaugurated the first 314 flight on the transpacific San Francisco–Hong Kong route when it departed Alameda on February 23, 1939, arriving in Hong Kong on March 3, after stops in Hawaii, Midway Island, Wake Island, Guam Island, Manila, and Macao on what was an 18,000-mile (29,000 km) round trip route. On March 29, the California Clipper commenced a regular passenger and mail service on the same route. A one-way trip on this route took over six days to complete.
- March 7 – (United States) All American Aviation (the future All American Airways, Allegheny Airlines, USAir, and US Airways) begins operations, providing passenger and mail service.
- May 12 – (United States) All American Aviation introduces an air pick-up (snatch) & drop method for exchanging mail in transit on experimental airmail routes in Ohio, New York, Pennsylvania, Kentucky, and West Virginia. More than 23,000 aerial pick-ups and drops would be made in the first year of operation, exchanging 75,000 pounds of mail.
- June–July – (United Kingdom and United States) To help promote use of the Air Mail service, in June and July 1939, Imperial Airways and Pan American Airways together provide a special "around the world" service; Imperial carried the souvenir mail from Foynes, Ireland, to Hong Kong, out of the eastbound New York City to New York route. Pan American provided service from New York to Foynes (departing 24 June, via the first flight of Northern FAM 18) and Hong Kong–San Francisco (via FAM 14), and United Airlines carried it on the final leg from San Francisco to New York, arriving on 28 July.
- June 24 – (United States-England) Pan Am Boeing 314 flying boat Yankee Clipper inaugurates the first regular transatlantic passenger / air mail service via the northern route from the United States to England, via Shediac (New Brunswick), Botwood (Newfoundland) and Foynes (Republic of Ireland).
- July 6 – (United States) Eastern Air Lines inaugurates the world's first scheduled air mail service by a rotary-wing aircraft, an experimental service using a Kellett KD-1 autogiro to carry mail from the roof of the Philadelphia Post Office in Philadelphia, Pennsylvania, to the airport at Camden, New Jersey. The service will last about a year.

== Airlines, companies and organizations founded ==
This decade, the following airlines or air cargo related companies or organizations were founded that were or would become important for air cargo and airmail history:

=== 1930 ===
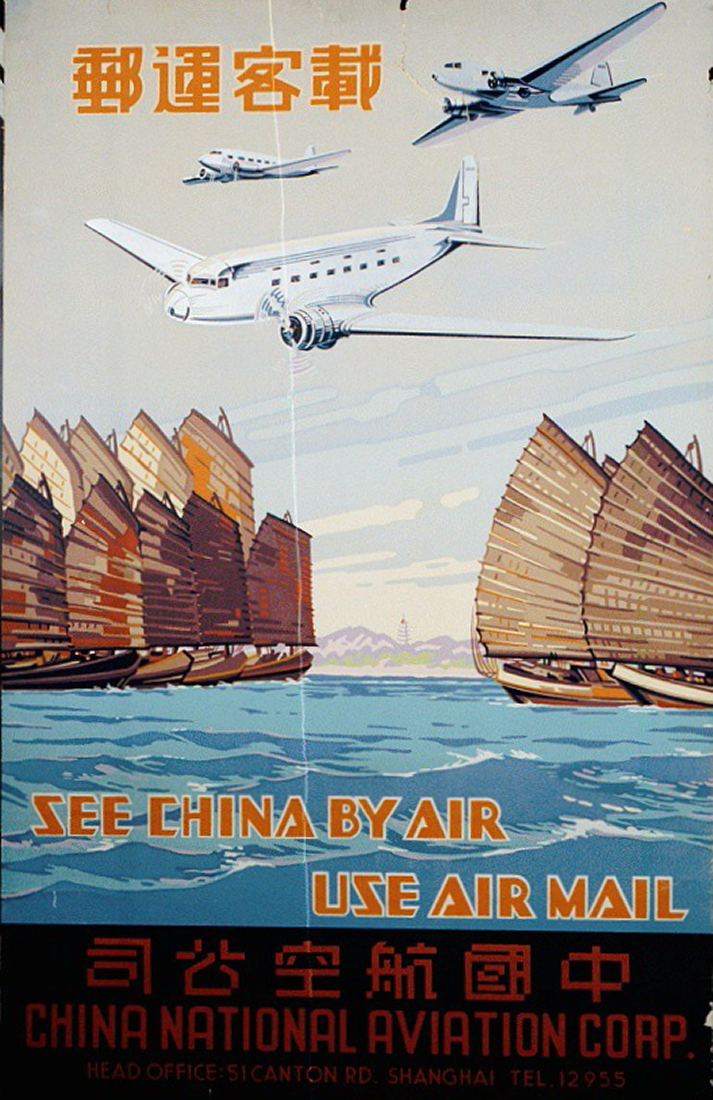
China By Air – CNAC Poster

- Undated – (Germany) Dachser Group SE & Co. KG – a German logistics company founded by Thomas Dachser. Their headquarters are stationed in Kempten in the Allgäu region. In January 2005, Thomas Dachser's grandson, Bernhard Simon, took over as head of the Management Board. DACHSER is involved in the European Logistics, Air & Sea Logistics, and food logistics business segments. In contract logistics, the group provides transport, warehousing and value-added services. In the 2000s the company's air freight activities expanded through take-overs. Today Dachser is a top air freight forwarding company.
- August 1 – (China) China National Aviation Corporation (CNAC) – a major Chinese national airline during the 1930s, established by a merger of two competing companies China Airways Federal and Shanghai-Chengtu Airways; carried government mail, commercial freight and vital China–Asia routes (later important in WW2 for the continuation of Chinese air transport, headquartered in India).

=== 1931 ===
- March 26 – (Switzerland) Swissair – formed by merger of Swiss carriers Belair and Ad Astra Aero and became Switzerland's national international airline until its bankruptcy in 2002; an important European operator of mail and mixed passenger/cargo services across Europe and to international markets.

=== 1932 ===
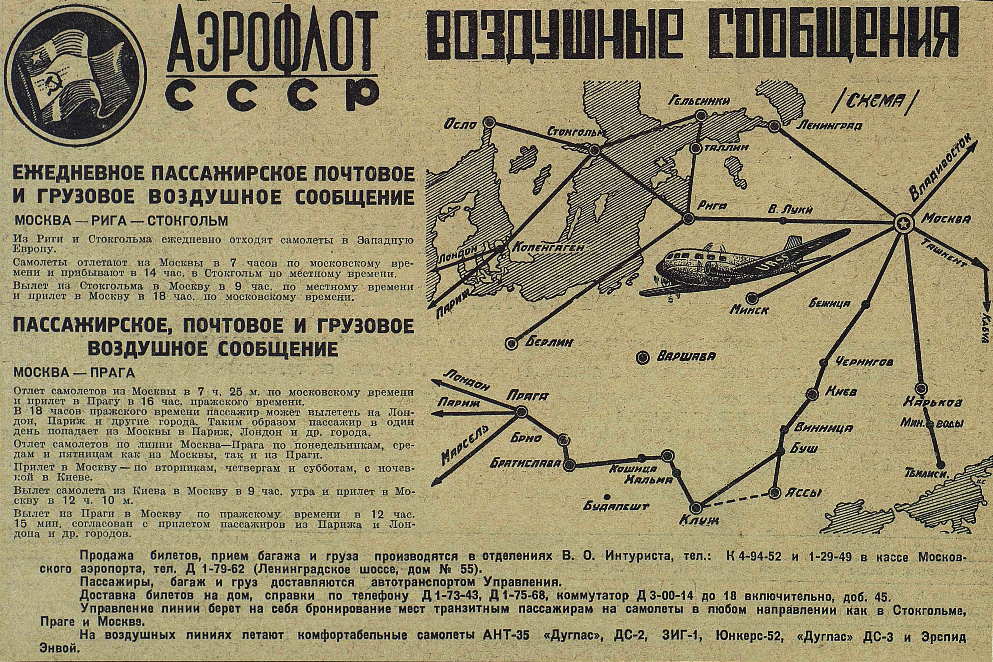
Aeroflot advertisement in Ogonyok magazine #22, 1937

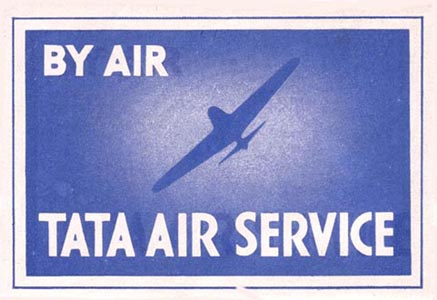
Airline bagagge label of Tata Sons/Tata Air Service/Tata Airlines as used in 1932.

- February 25 – (Soviet Union) Aeroflot – when the Grazhdansky Vozdushny Flot (Civil Air Fleet) came under the control of the Chief Directorate on 25 February 1932, on 25 March the airline name Aeroflot was officially adopted for the entire Soviet Civil Air Fleet. While Soviet airmail/airline roots go back to the 1920s (a.o. Dobrolyot), the Aeroflot identity and centralised Soviet civil air-fleet organisation date to 1932, it rapidly became the USSR’s dominant carrier and handled large volumes of internal mail, freight and state logistics. During the time of the Soviet Union, Aeroflot was the largest airline in the world. In 1992, following the dissolution of the Soviet Union, Aeroflot was divided into approximately 400 regional airlines informally known as Babyflots and was restructured into an open joint-stock company.
- August – (United States) General Air Express – founded by seven major airlines at the time, American Airways, Transcontinental & Western Air, Pennsylvania Airlines, United States Airways, Transamerican Airlines Corporation, Ludington Airlines and Eastern Air Transport to handle the air express of these companies in a uniform way. Initially a competitor of Railway Express Agency (REA), all founding companies with the exception of Transcontinental & Western Air would switch contract from General Air Express to REA as from February 1935 for efficiency reasons.
- October 15 – (India) Tata Airlines – founded by J. R. D. Tata, later became Air India.
- December 12 – (United States) Air Express Corporation – founded to provide an air express service between New York and Los Angeles, operating Lockheed Model 9 Orion aircraft, modified to fly cargo only. Discontinued service after two months due to insufficient traffic.

=== 1933 ===
Turkish Airlines logo (1933–1956)

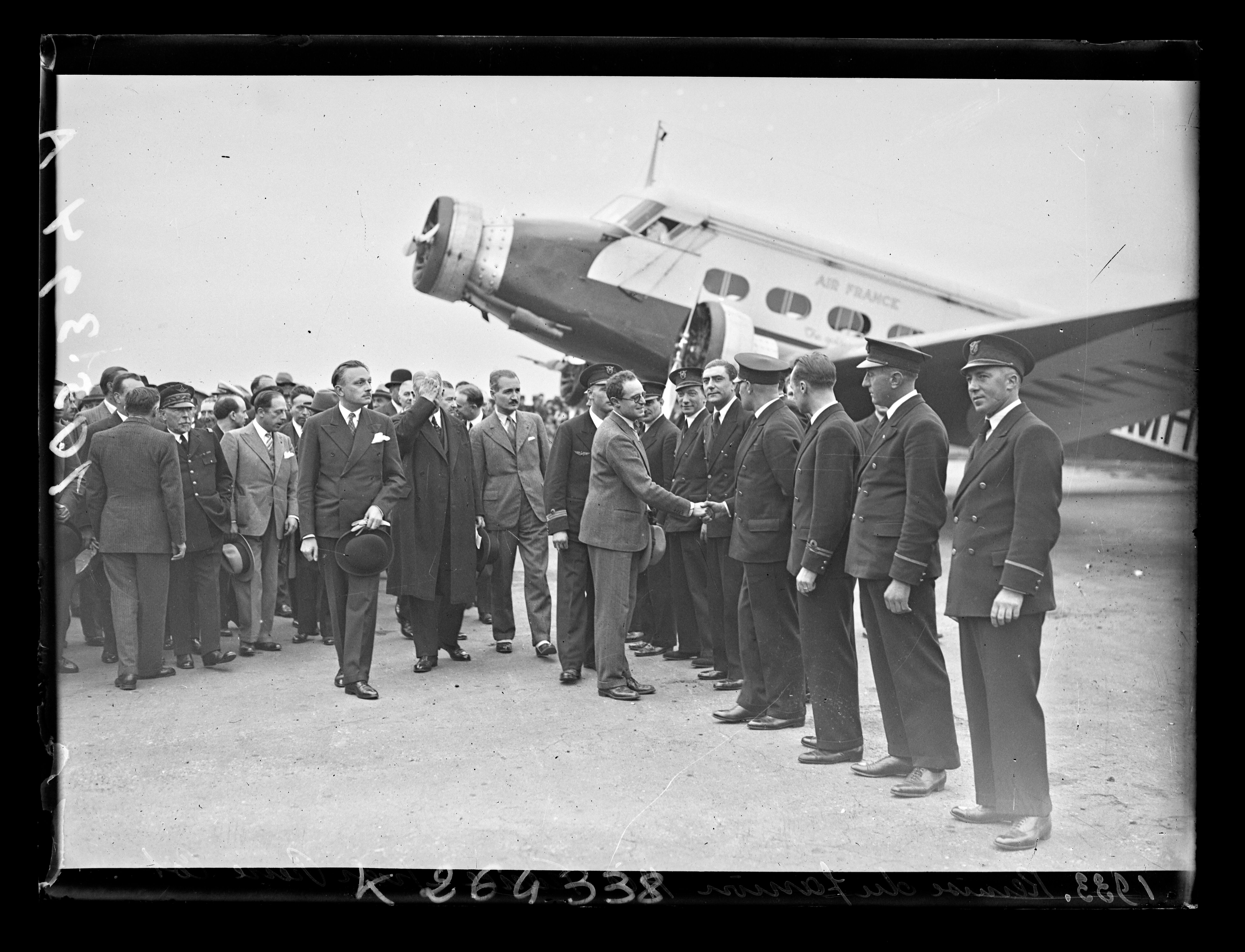
Presentation of the Air France pennant by Pierre Cot, 1933

- Undated – (China) Southwestern Aviation Corporation – a domestic Chinese airline set up to compete with China National Aviation Corporation and Eurasia Aviation Corporation, focusing on mail and passengers. Operated between 1933 and 1938.
- May – (India) Indian National Airways Ltd – an airline based in Delhi, India, formed on the basis of a government airmail contract. In 1953 Indian National Airways was nationalised and merged into Indian Airlines.
- May 20 * Turkish State Airlines (later Turkish Airlines) – started off providing domestic passenger and mail services.
- June 15 – (United States) Pacific Seaboard Air Lines – incorporated in California, started air mail service (U.S. Air Mail Route 8) June 3, 1934. The airline changed its name to Chicago and Southern Air Lines (C&S) in 1935. On May 1, 1953, C&S merged with Delta Air Lines.
- August 30 – (France) Air France was formed as a merger of five existing airlines: Compagnie Générale Aéropostale, which was founded in 1918 as Société des lignes Latécoère and, in some sources, the earliest lineage of Air France is stated to be 1918; Société Générale des Transports Aériens (SGTA), which was founded in 1919; Compagnie Internationale de Navigation Aérienne (CIDNA), which was founded in 1920; Air Union, which was founded in 1923 and formed from the merger of Compagnie des Messageries Aériennes (CMA), which absorbed CGT, and Grands Express Aériens; and Air Orient, which was founded in 1929. These airlines built extensive networks across Europe, to French colonies in North Africa and farther afield prior to their merger into Air France in 1933, therefor the consolidated national carrier quickly became a significant player in international airmail and air freight services.

=== 1934 ===
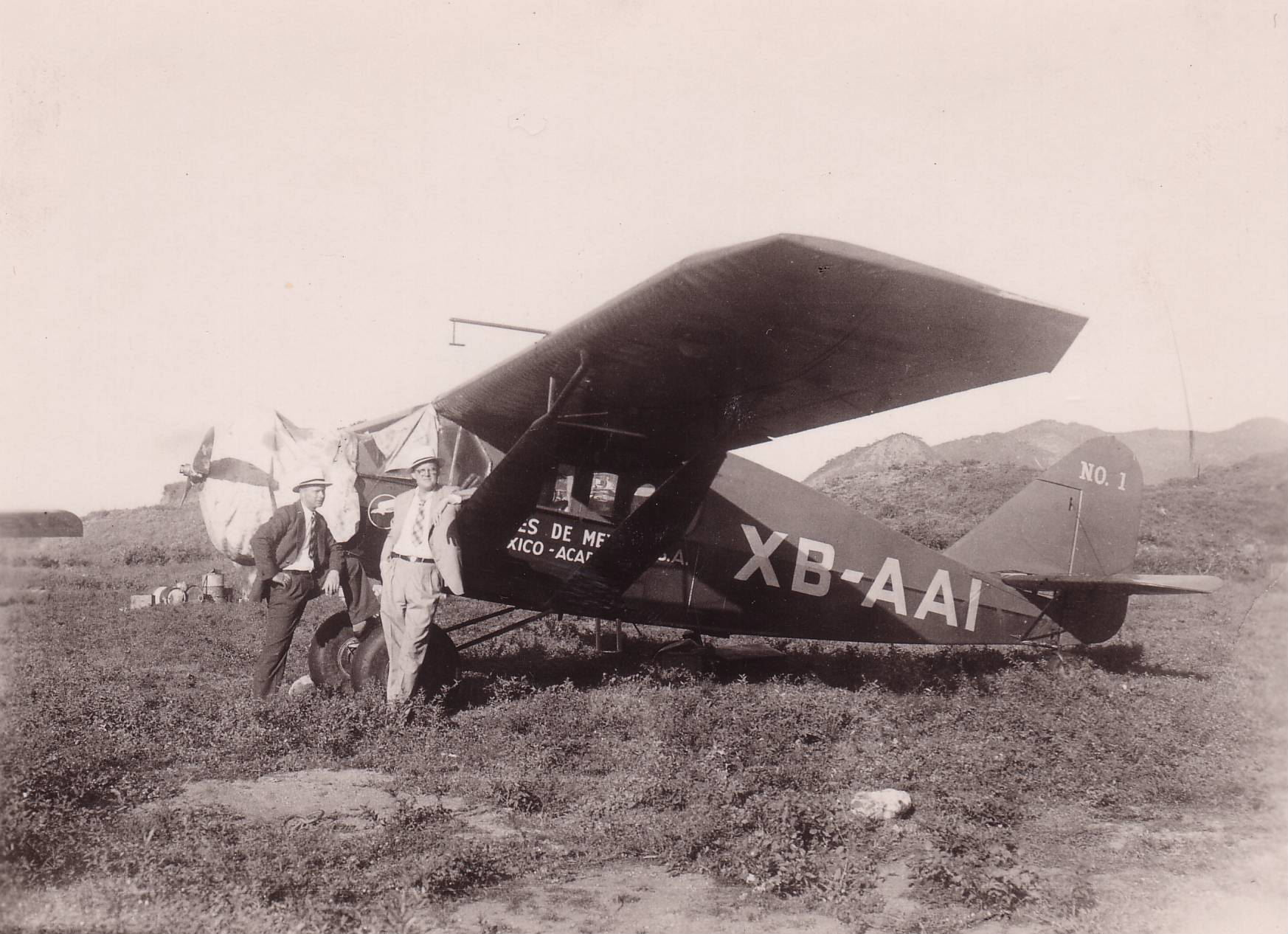
Aeronaves de México (Aeroméxico) plane No. 1, Mexico City Acapulco Walter Luyken + Mr. Haberbier c1935

- September 15 – (Mexico) Aeronaves de México / Aeroméxico – Mexico's national carrier, played a central role in Mexican domestic and regional airmail and cargo carriage and later grew into the main Mexican international airline.

=== 1936 ===
- Undated , Air Transport Association of America (ATA), currently known as Airlines for America (A4A) – an American trade association and lobbying group based in Washington, D.C. that has represented major North American airlines since 1936.
- April 15 – (Ireland) Aer Lingus - Irish national airline founded in 1936; provided crucial mail services across the Irish Sea and North Atlantic links which carried official mail and commercial freight on early routes.

=== 1937 ===
- Undated – (Japan) Nippon Express – established in line with the Nippon Tsu-un Kaisha Law as a semi-government transportation service by pooling the assets of Kokusai Tsu-un KK (International Express Co., Ltd.), which consolidated many of the nation's small-scale rail transport companies, and six other competitors, with additional funding from the Japanese government. After more than a decade of operation the company was fully privatized in the 1950s. In that same decade it also started its domestic and international air cargo consolidation business. Nippon Express later developed into one of the world's largest freight forwarders with a global network spanning dozens of countries.
- April 10 – (Canada) Trans-Canada Air Lines (TCA) – created by the Canadian government, later renamed Air Canada. TCA's early finances and route planning included air-mail contracts and the airline carried mail on coast-to-coast services; it later operated dedicated freight/mail aircraft.

=== 1938 ===
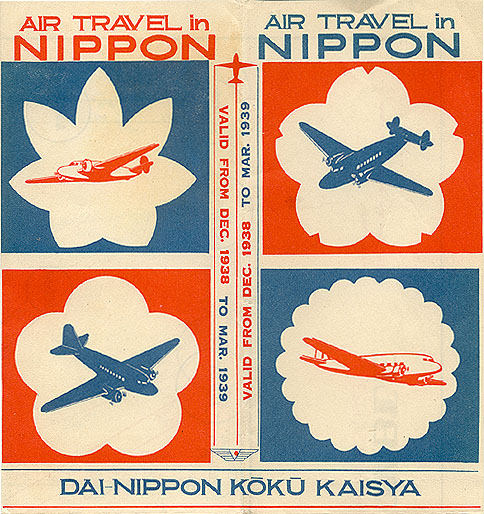
Cover of timetable for Dai Nippon Koku / Imperial Japanese Airways

- December – (Japan) Imperial Japanese Airways – Japan reorganised its long-distance national airline capacity in the late 1930s when the government bought a 50 percent share of Japan Air Transport, and renamed it the Dai Nippon Kōkū – Imperial Japanese Airways (also known as Imperial Japanese Airlines, Great Japan Airlines or Greater Japan Airlines). The organisation became important for domestic and military/logistics transport and for mail routes in East Asia in the lead-up to WWII.

=== 1939 ===
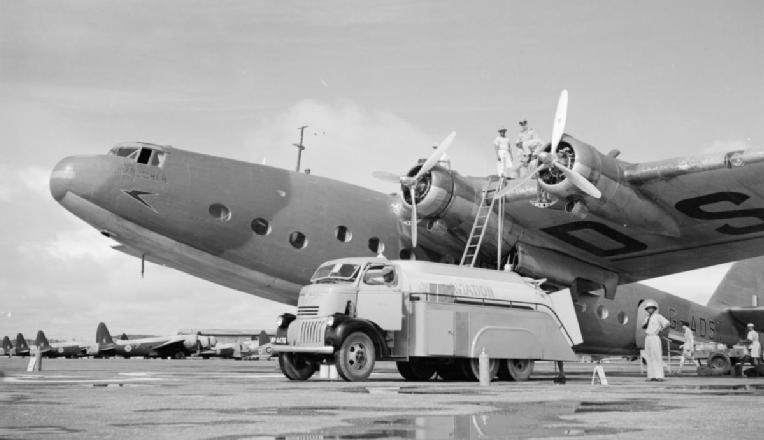
BOAC Armstrong Whitworth Ensign Mark.II, G-ADSV Explorer, is refuelled at Accra, Gold Coast, early 1940s

- November 24 – (United Kingdom) British Overseas Airways Corporation (BOAC) was the British state-owned national airline created in 1939 by the merger of Imperial Airways and British Airways Ltd. It continued operating overseas services throughout World War II. It merged with British European Airways effective 31 March 1974, forming today's British Airways. From the war years onward BOAC handled crucial long-range government, military and mail/cargo services linking the UK with Empire and allied territories.

== First flights ==
This decade, the following aircraft that were or would become important for air cargo and airmail history had their first flight:

=== 1930 ===
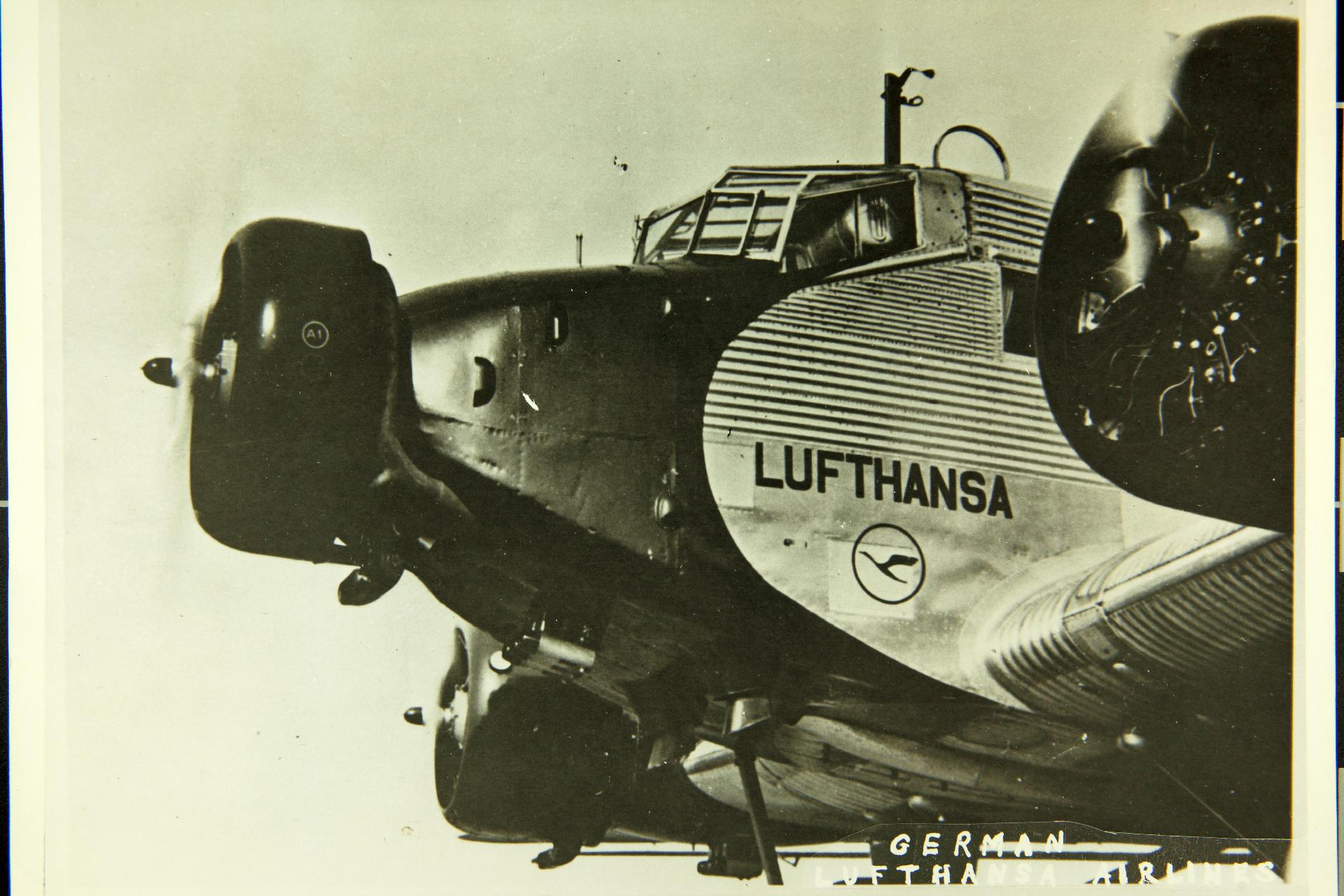
Junkers Ju-52 of Deutsche Luft Hansa

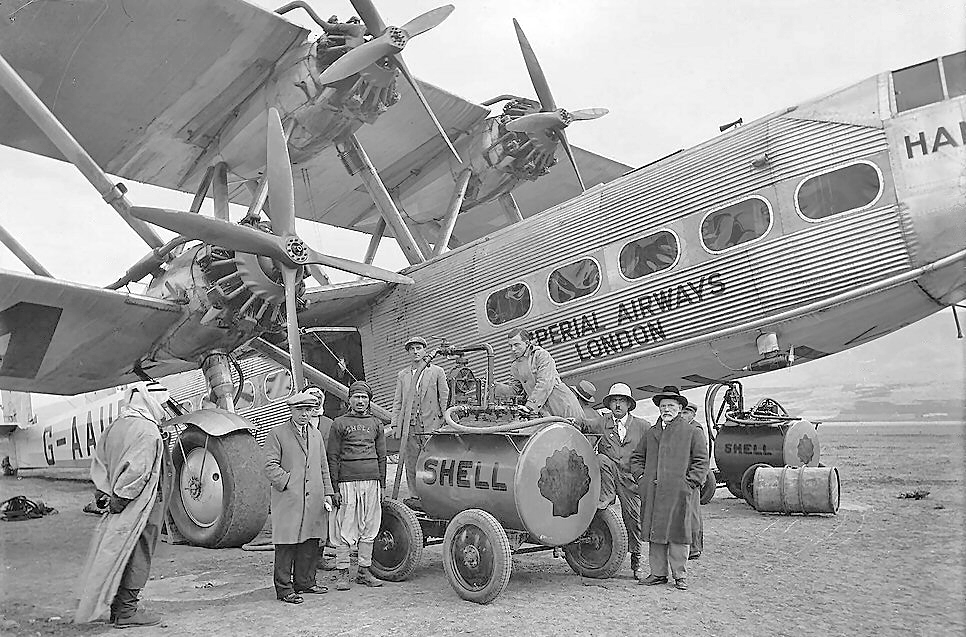
Refuelling Imperial Airways H.P.42 Hanno at Samakh, Tiberias, Palestine, October 1931.

- Undated – (United States) Pitcairn PA-8 Super Mailwing – designed specifically as a mail plane for US mail.
- Undated – (United States) Pitcairn PCA-2 autogiro – used in mail/rooftop pickup experiments (concept demonstrator).
- Undated – (United States) Stinson SM-6000 Airliner – a three-engined (trimotor) airliner designed and built by the Stinson Aircraft Corporation. The SM-6000 was a high-wing braced monoplane with room for a pilot and a cabin for up to ten passengers and mail.
- May 6 – (United States) Boeing Monomail Model 200/221 – designed as a mail plane.
- September 11 – (Germany) Junkers Ju 52 transport plane – initially designed as a single engined freighter with large doors and a roof hatch, with later two additional engines added; widely used for combined mail, freight and passenger as well as for dedicated cargo duties.
- November 14 – (United Kingdom) Handley Page H.P.42 and H.P.45 – four-engine biplane airliners designed and manufactured by British aviation company Handley Page, based in Radlett, Hertfordshire. They held the distinction of being the largest airliners in regular use in the world on the type's introduction in 1931. The mail was carried in a dedicated baggage and mail compartment located amidships, between the forward and aft passenger cabins.

=== 1931 ===
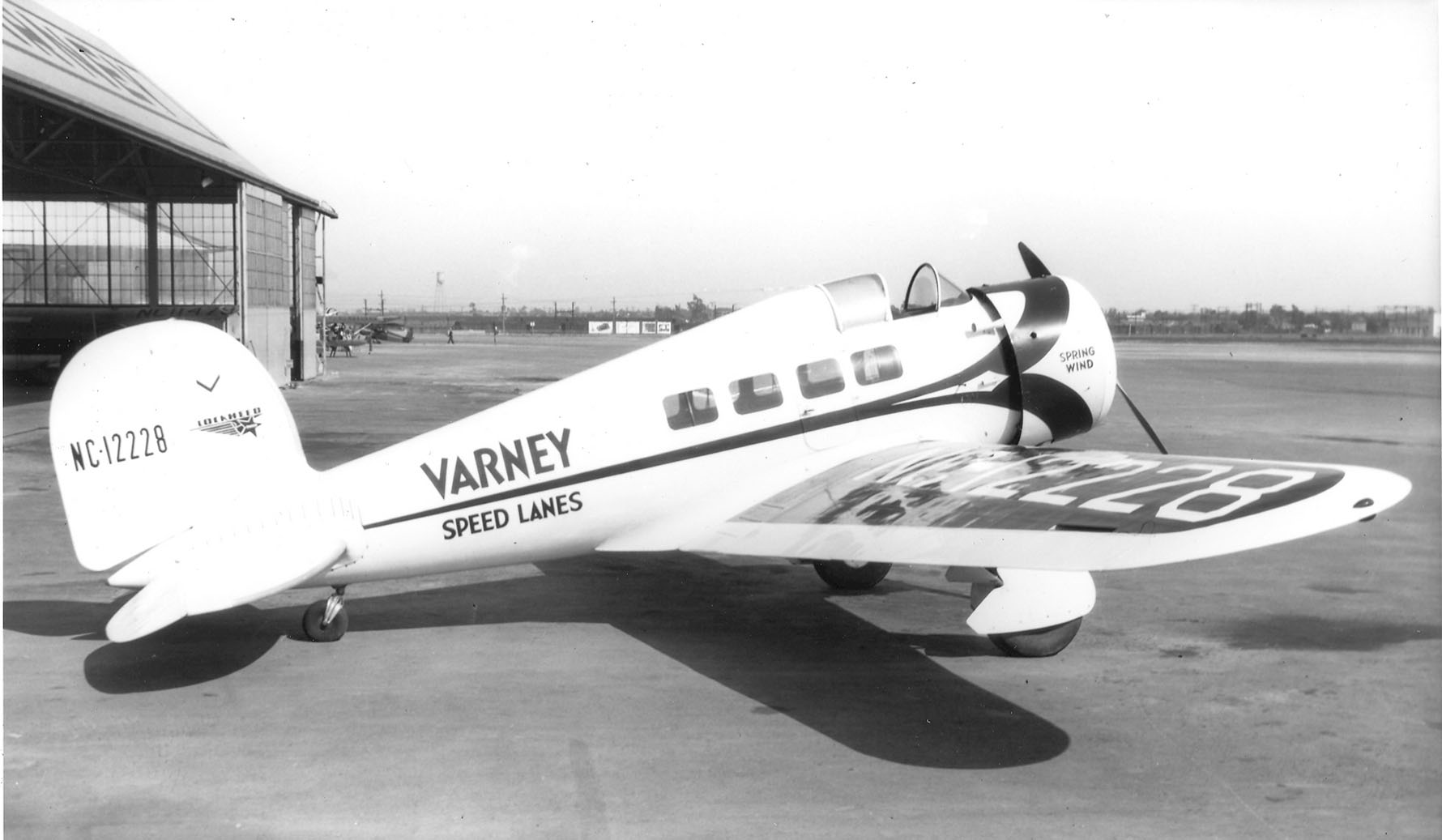
Lockheed Model 9 Orion of Varney Speed/Air Lines serving Northern California.

- Undated – (Italy) Savoia-Marchetti S.66 – a 1930s Italian twin-hull flying boat designed and built by Savoia-Marchetti as an enlarged development of the S.55, used on Mediterranean and colonial passenger/mail routes.
- Undated – (United Kingdom / Canada) Avro 627 Mailplane – a prototype built to Canadian mail requirements.
- Undated – (United States) Kellett KD-1 Autogiro was used in demonstration mail rooftop operations.
- Undated – (United States) Lockheed Model 9 Orion – a single-engined passenger and mail carrying aircraft built for commercial airlines. It was faster than any American military aircraft of that time.

=== 1932 ===
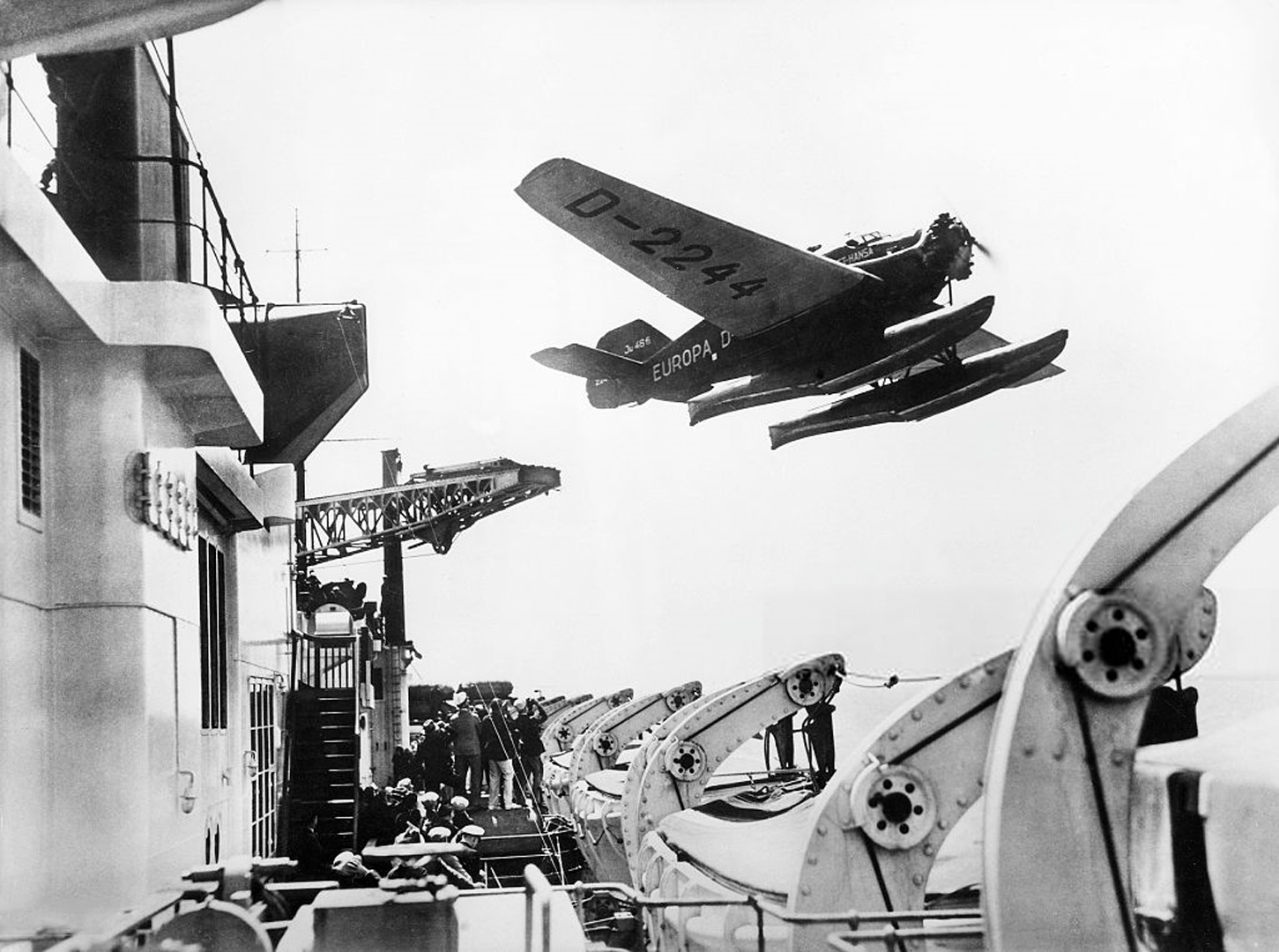
Junkers Ju 46 D-2244 Europa Katapultstart, 1932

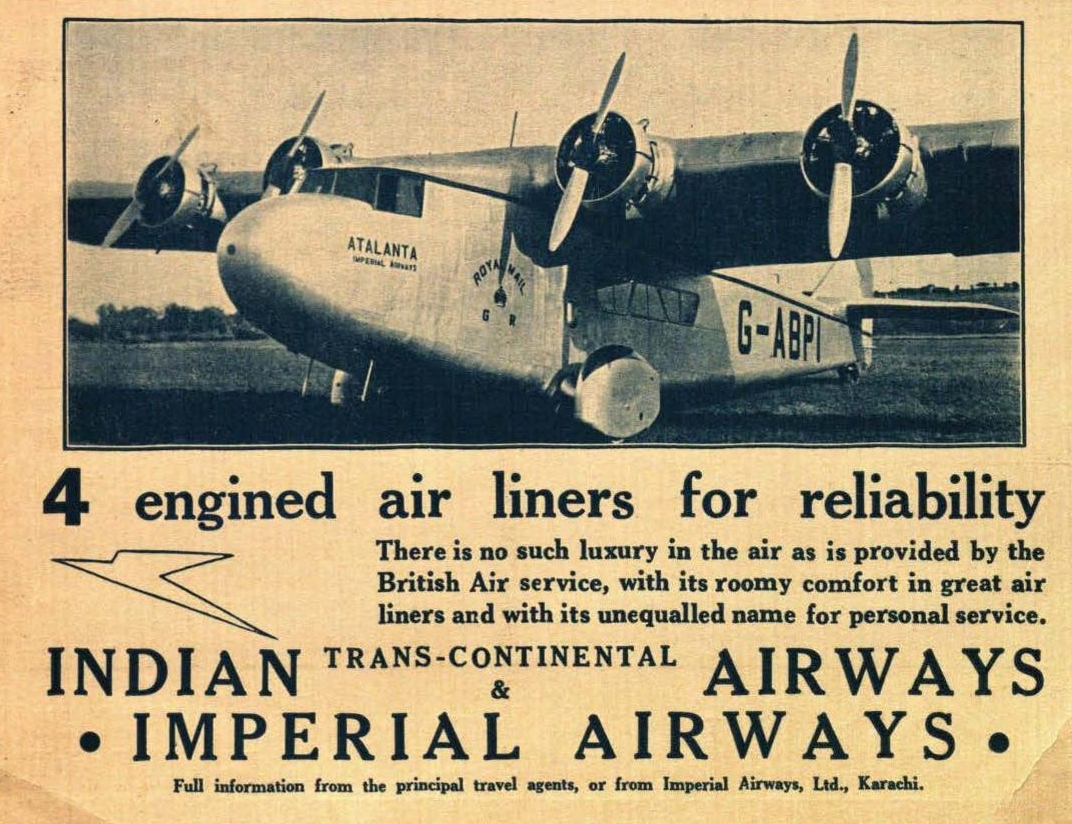
Imperial Airways Ad 1936 with Armstrong Whitworth Atalanta aircraft

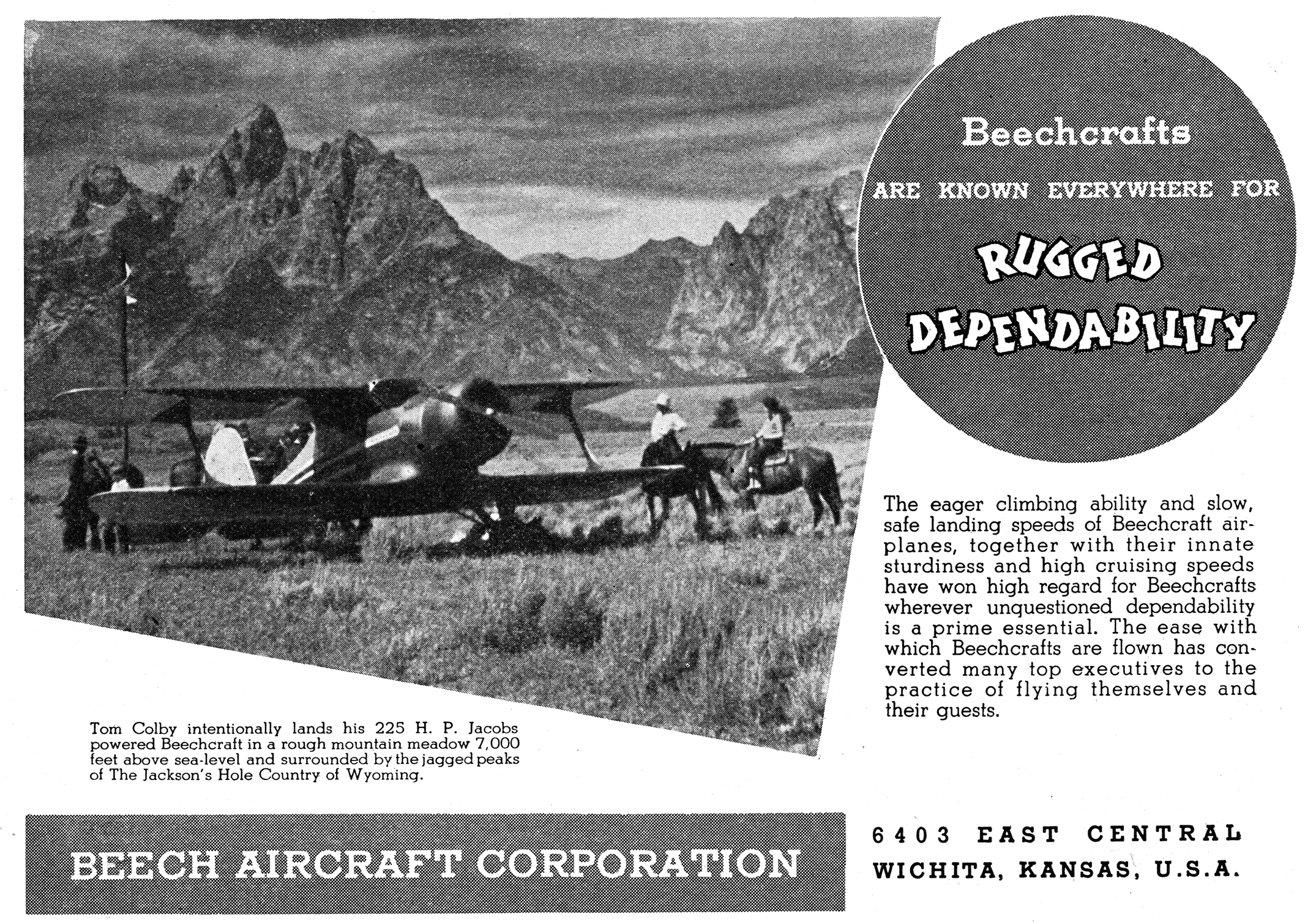
Beech Aircraft Corporation ad Model 17 "Staggerwing" 1937

- Undated – (United States) Northrop Gamma is a single-engine all-metal monoplane cargo aircraft used in the 1930s. The Gamma saw fairly limited civilian service as mail plane with Trans World Airlines, and with Manchukuo Manchurian Air Lines.
- Undated – (Germany) Junkers Ju 46 – a catapult-launched seaplane derivative for ship-to-shore airmail.
- Undated – (United Kingdom) Saro-Percival Mailplane, later redesigned as the Spartan Cruiser.
- June 6 – (United Kingdom) Armstrong Whitworth AW.15 Atalanta – a four-engine airliner designed and produced by the British aircraft manufacturer Sir W.G. Armstrong Whitworth Aircraft Limited at Coventry. The Atalanta was specifically developed to fulfil the needs of the British airline Imperial Airways, who sought a new four-engined airliner to serve its African routes for passengers and mail.
- November 4 – (United States) Beechcraft Model 17 Staggerwing – an American biplane with an atypical negative wing stagger (the lower wing is farther forward than the upper wing). It first flew in 1932, and was sold on the civilian market, being used for transport and air racing. During World War II, it was used by allied forces, and after the war continued in civilian production until 1949, with 785 having been produced. During World War II, the U.S. military acquired hundreds of the aircraft (designated as the UC-43 by the USAAF and GB-1/2 by the US Navy), partly used and partly new, for utility and cargo/communications duties. The initial need cited by the U.S. Army Air Force in 1942 was for an aircraft to transport both passengers and mail.
- December 1 – (Germany) Heinkel He 70 "Blitz" – a fast mail/passenger monoplane designed for express mail and express passenger services.

=== 1933 ===
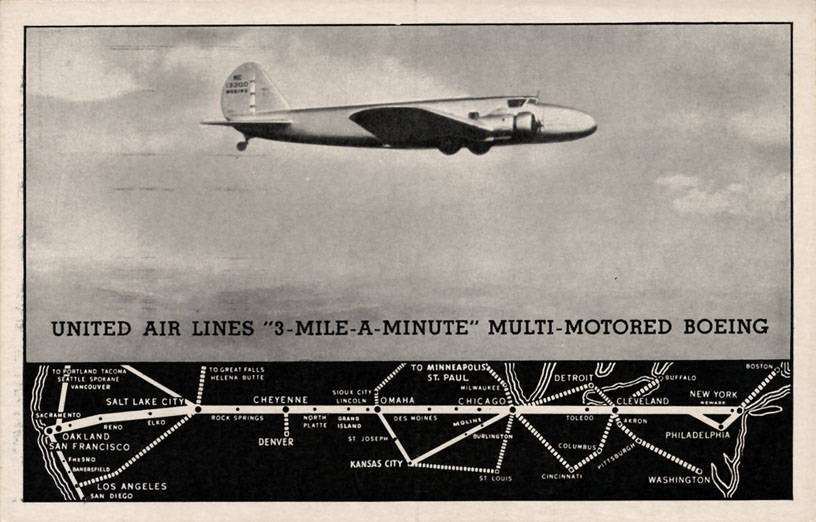
United Air Lines " 3-Mile-A-Minute" Multi-Motored Boeing" (Boeing Model 247)

- Undated – (Japan) Nakajima P-1 – a 1930s Japanese single engine, single seat biplane intended for night airmail flights, derived from the Nakajima E4N3 Naval reconnaissance seaplane. Nine were built. It operated on a night route connecting Tokyo, Osaka, and Fukuoka starting in August 1933.
- Undated – (United States) Stinson Reliant – a popular single-engine four- to five-seat high-wing monoplane manufactured by the Stinson Aircraft Division of the Aviation Manufacturing Corporation of Wayne, Michigan. It was used by the United States Army Air Forces in World War II as a utility aircraft, designated UC-81, and as trainer designated AT-19. The Royal Navy and Royal Air Force also used Reliants, for light transport and communication duties. After the war they were sold on the civilian market as the Vultee V-77.
- February 8 – (United States) Boeing 247 – an early all-metal fast twin that carried mail/express cargo for airlines. The mail and baggage were carried in two separate cargo compartments located in the fuselage: A forward cargo area was situated behind the aircraft's nose, in front of the passenger cabin and below the cockpit (this compartment was accessible only externally) and a second tail section cargo bay was located in the aft section of the fuselage, accessible via a door to the left of the main passenger entrance.
- February 19 – (United States) Vultee V-1 – a 1930s American single-engined airliner built by the Airplane Development Corporation, designed by Gerard Vultee and financed by automobile manufacturer Errett Cord. It was a high-speed mail/passenger transport initially for American Airlines, the fastest commercial airliners of their day.
- April – (United Kingdom / Spain) Cierva C.30 (C.30A / Avro-licensed versions) – an autogyro used in rotary-wing mail/parcel experiments.
- May – (Japan) Mitsubishi Ki-2 – a light bomber built by Mitsubishi for the Imperial Japanese Army Air Service (IJAAS) in the 1930s. Its dedicated civilian variant, the Otori (Phoenix), was used for various goodwill and long-range flights by the Asahi Shimbun newspaper, which, in that era of developing aviation, almost certainly included the carriage of official or commemorative mail (a common practice for such high-profile flights to demonstrate speed and reliability).
- May – (United States) Northrop Delta – an American single-engined passenger transport aircraft of the 1930s. Closely related to Northrop's Gamma mail plane, 13 were produced by the Northrop Corporation, followed by 19 aircraft built under license by Canadian Vickers Limited. Trans World Airlines used the 1A prototype to carry mail, and AB Aerotransport (ABA, predecessor of SAS) bought the 1E type mailplane variant, which more closely resembled the Gamma, with a slim fuselage carrying its cargo in a compartment ahead of the cockpit.

=== 1934 ===
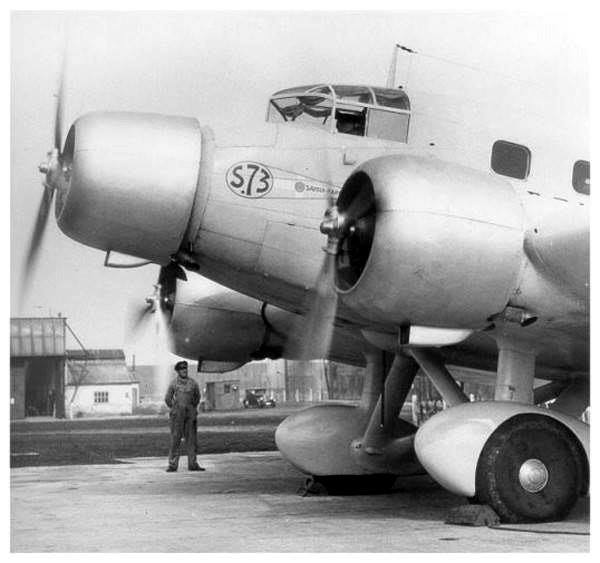
Savoia-Marchetti SM.73

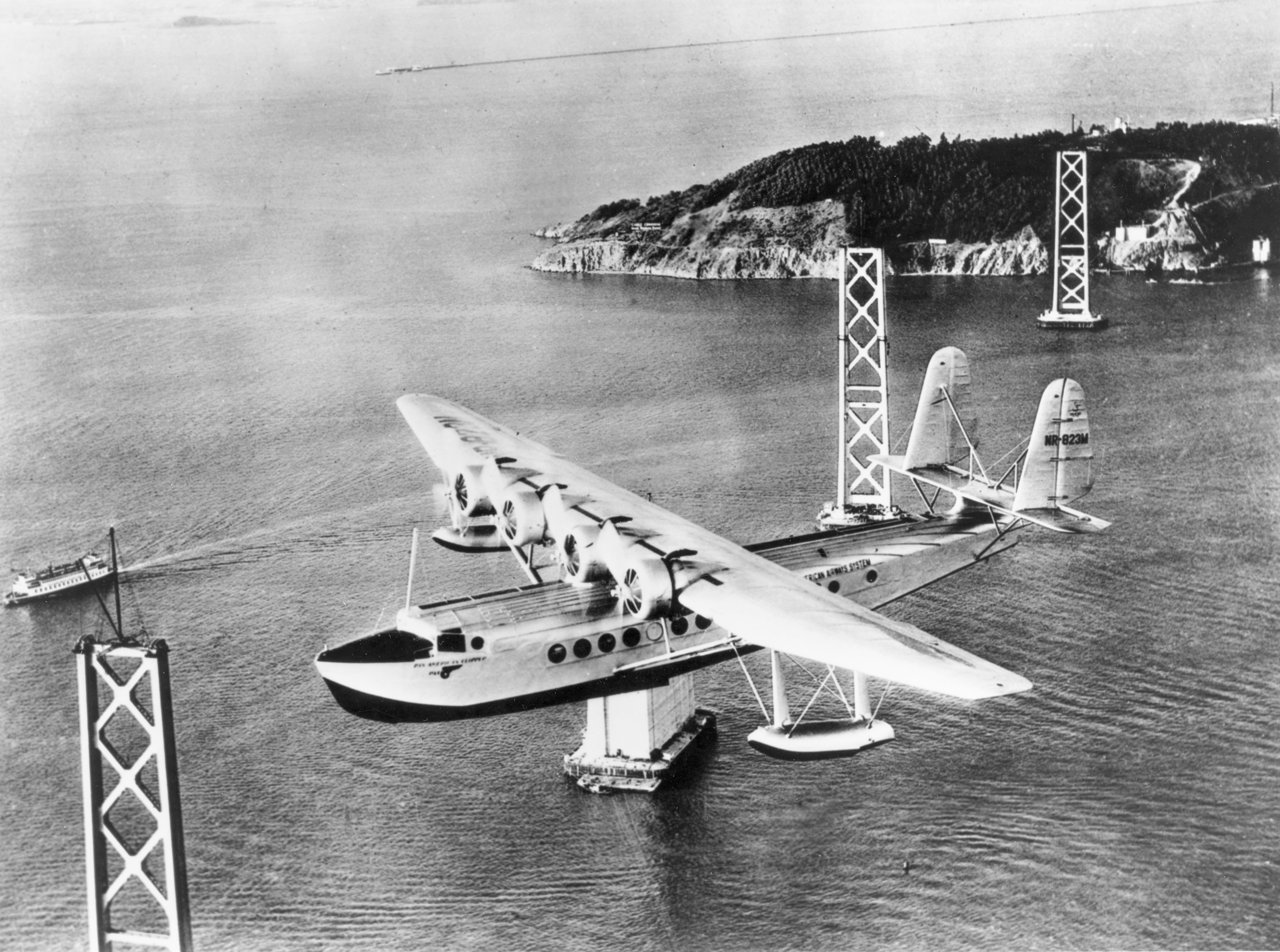
Pan American Airways Sikorsky S-42 "Pan American Clipper" in flight over the under-construction San Francisco-Oakland Bay Bridge

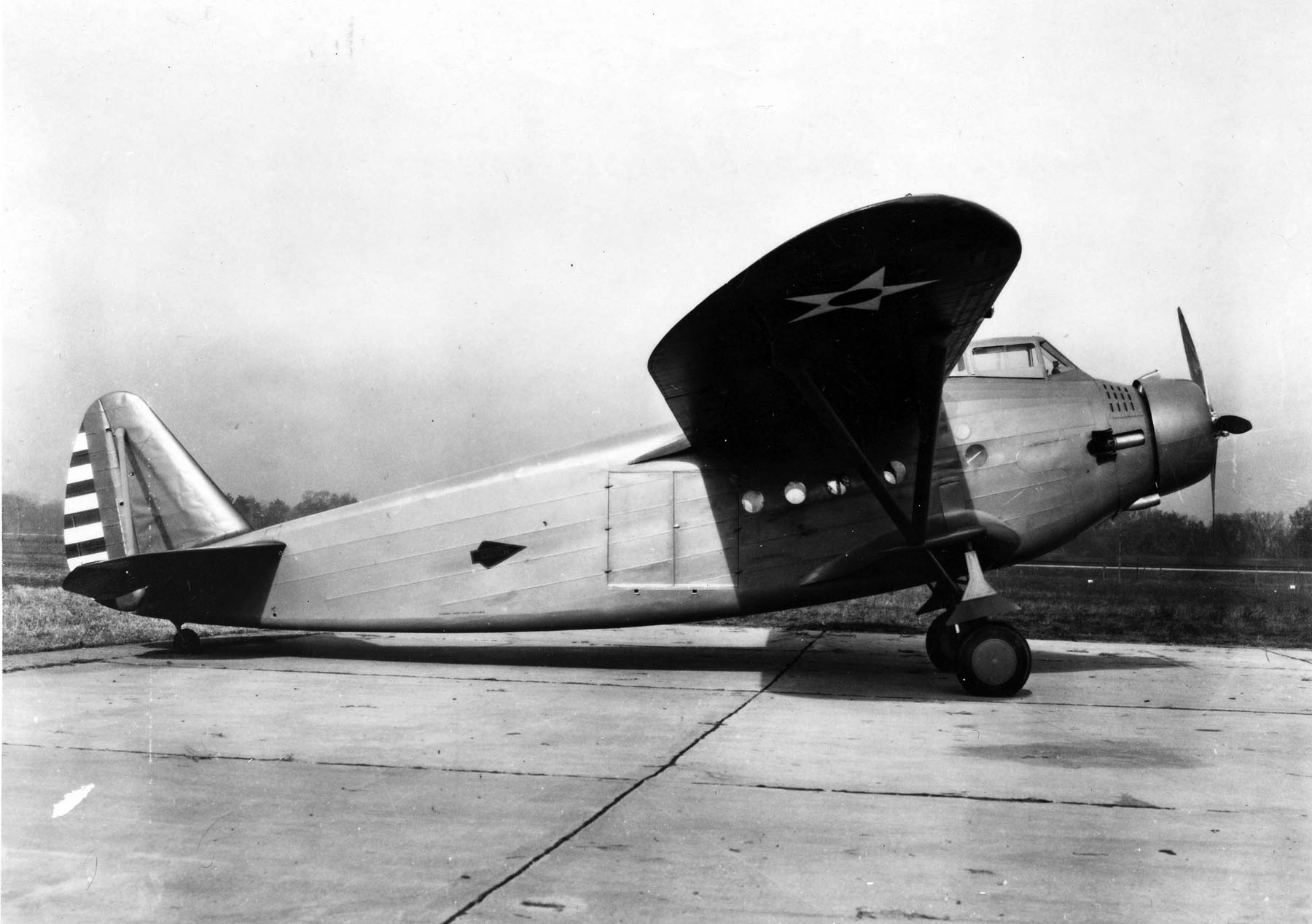
Kreider-Reisner XC-31 USAF

- Undated – (France) Caudron Simoun – a 1930s French four-seat touring monoplane. It was used as a mail plane by Air Bleu, flew record-setting long-range flights, and was also used as a liaison aircraft by the Armée de l'Air during World War II.
- Undated – (Italy) Caproni Ca.133 – a three-engined transport/bomber aircraft used by the Italian Regia Aeronautica from the Second Italo-Abyssinian War until World War II. Originally developed as a civilian airliner and successor to the Ca.101, the Ca.133 prototype first flew in December 1934, and production began in 1935. The military versions of the aircraft were used as transports and light bombers and saw action on all fronts. Ala Littoria operated a fleet of at least twelve Ca.133s, using them on routes to East Africa.
- Undated – (Italy) Savoia-Marchetti S.73 – an Italian three-engine airliner that flew on domestic and colonial passenger/mail routes in the 1930s and early 1940s. The aircraft entered service in March 1935 with a production run of 48 aircraft. Four were exported to Belgium for SABENA, while seven others were produced by SABCA. The main customer was the Italian airline Ala Littoria.
- February 23 – (United States) Lockheed Model 10 Electra – an American twin-engined, all-metal monoplane airliner developed by the Lockheed Aircraft Corporation, which was produced primarily in the 1930s to compete with the Boeing 247 and Douglas DC-2 on passenger/mail routes. The type gained considerable fame after being flown by Amelia Earhart and Fred Noonan on their ill-fated around-the-world expedition in 1937. The Electra was produced in several variants, for both civilian and military customers. Lockheed built a total of 149 Electras.
- March 30 – (United States) Sikorsky S-42 – a commercial long-range flying boat designed and built by Sikorsky Aircraft to meet requirements for a long-range flying boat laid out by Pan American World Airways (Pan Am) in 1931. It was used on transoceanic mail routes by Pan Am and others. Mail was carried in a combination mail and baggage compartment situated in the aft section of the hull, just behind the passenger accommodations and adjacent to the steward's equipment and washrooms. The location was designed to be easily accessible through an after hatchway.
- April 17 – (United Kingdom) De Havilland Dragon Rapide DH.89 – a short-haul biplane airliner developed and produced by British aircraft company de Havilland, used on regional mail/passenger routes (many postal duties).
- April 27 – (United States) Stinson Model A – a moderately successful airliner used for passengers and mail/freight.
- May 11 – (United States) Douglas DC-2 – a 14-passenger, twin-engined airliner that was produced by the American company Douglas Aircraft Company starting in 1934. It competed with the Boeing 247. In 1935, Douglas produced a larger version called the DC-3, which became one of the most successful aircraft in history. Mail was primarily carried in the forward cargo compartments, located between the cockpit and the main passenger cabin.
- September 22 – (United States) Kreider-Reisner XC-31 or Fairchild XC-31 – an American single-engined monoplane transport aircraft of the 1930s designed and built by Kreider-Reisner. It was one of the last fabric-covered aircraft tested by the U.S. Army Air Corps. Designed as an alternative to the emerging twin-engined transports of the time such as the Douglas DC-2, it was evaluated by the Air Corps at Wright Field, Ohio, under the test designation XC-941, but rejected in favor of all-metal twin-engined designs. The XC-31 was built with an aluminium alloy framework covered by fabric, and featured strut-braced wing and fully retractable landing gear, with the main gear units mounted on small wing-like stubs and retracting inwards. An additional novel feature was the provision of main cargo doors that were parallel with the ground to facilitate loading.

=== 1935 ===
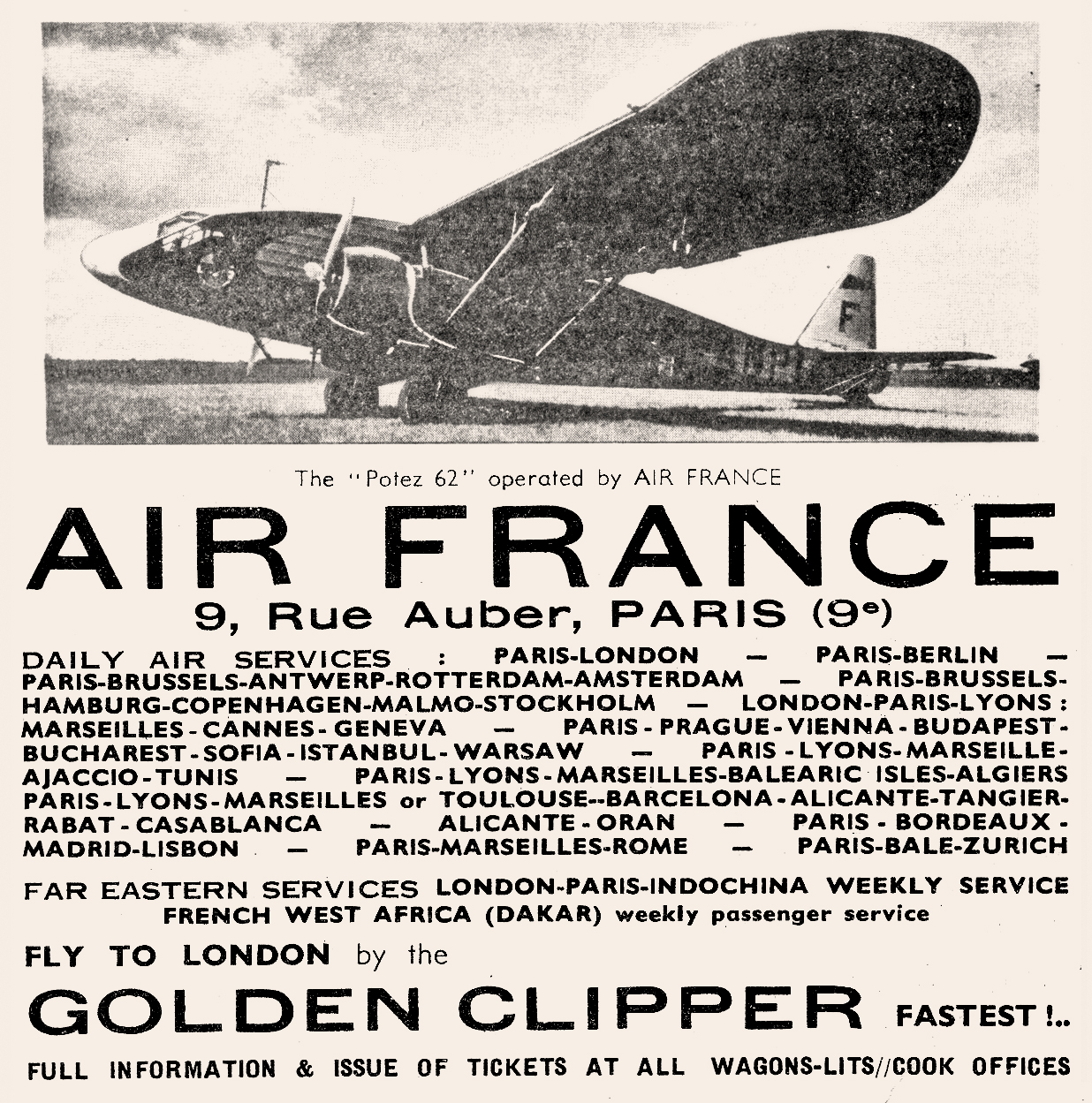
Air France "Potez 62" advertisement 1936

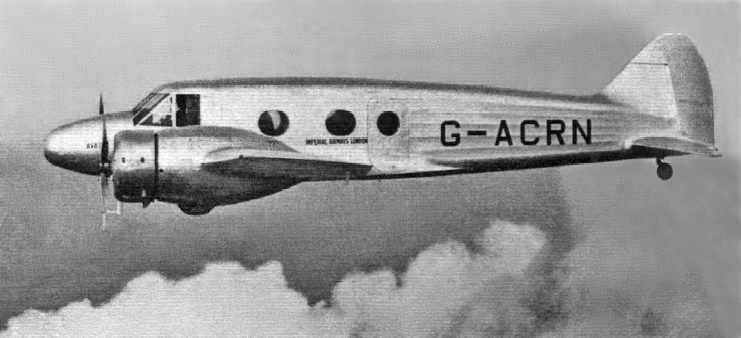
Avro 652 Anson

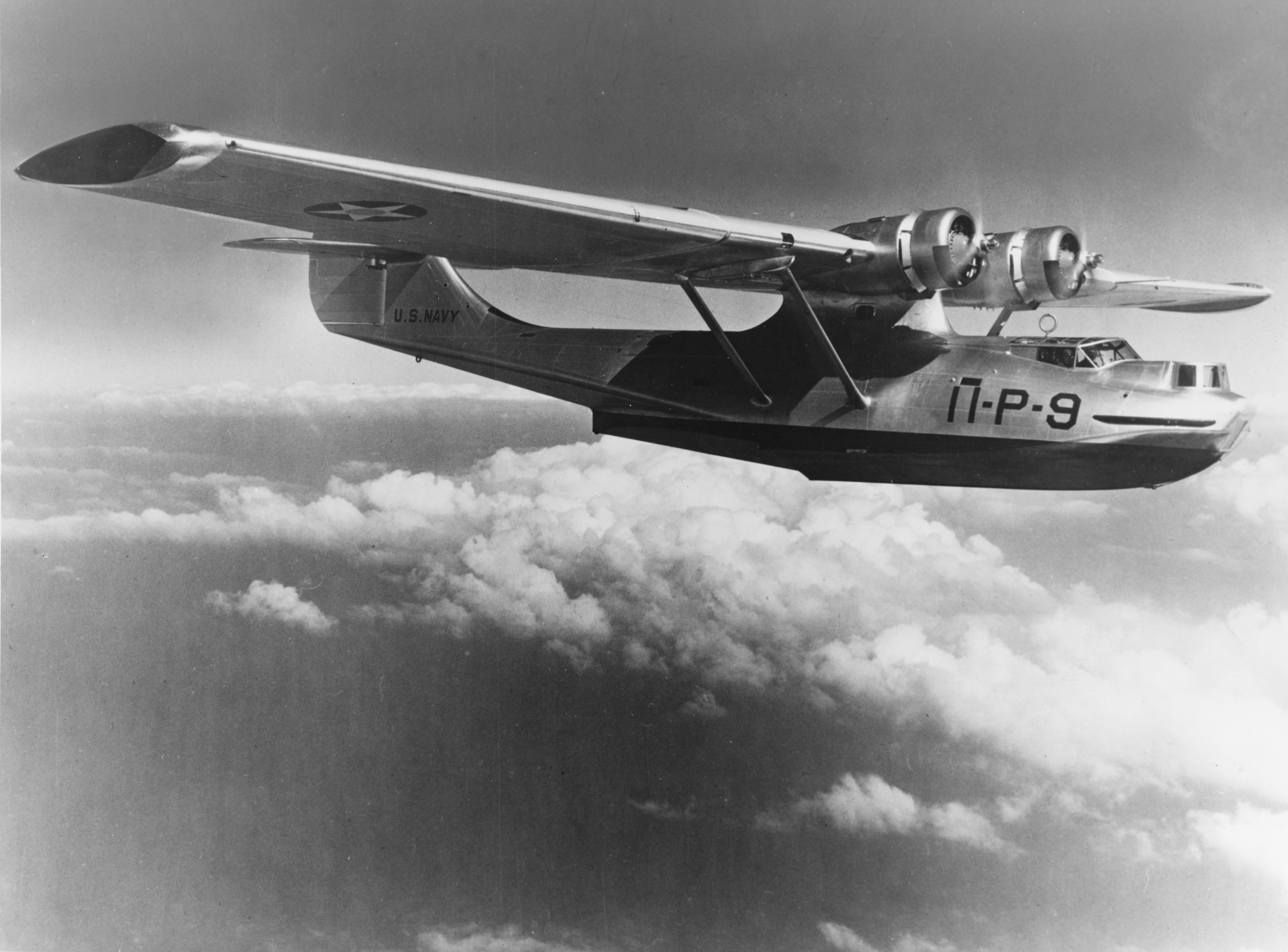
Consolidated PBY-1 Catalina of the US Navy squadron VP-11 in flight c.1938

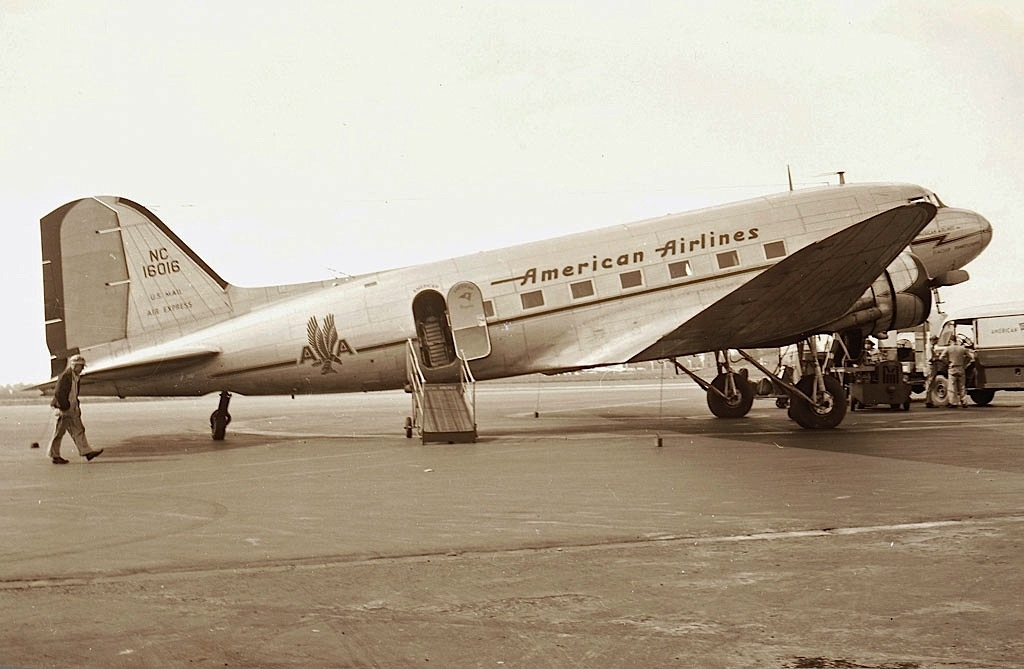
Douglas DC-3 of American Airlines

- January 28 – (France) Potez 62 – a French twin-engine civil airliner, designed by Henry Potez in 1934. It was the twin-engine mail/passenger transport for Air France Europe routes.
- February 24 – (Germany) Heinkel He 111 C/G civil variants – a German airliner and medium bomber designed by Siegfried and Walter Günter at Heinkel Flugzeugwerke.
- March 11 – (United Kingdom) Avro 652 – a British light passenger/mail airliner, built and designed for Imperial Airways by A.V. Roe and Company.
- March 15 – (Germany) Dornier Do 18 – a development of the Do 16 flying boat. It was developed for the Luftwaffe, but Deutsche Luft Hansa received five aircraft and used these for tests between the Azores and the North American continent in 1936 and on their airmail route over the South Atlantic from 1937 to 1939.
- March 24 – (United Kingdom) Avro Anson – a British twin-engine, long-range military multi-role aircraft with considerable load-carrying ability built by the aircraft manufacturer Avro. The original Avro Anson design (Avro 652) was based on a commercial aircraft request for a multi-passenger, mail-carrying aircraft. After the war, many surplus military Ansons were converted for civilian use as light transports and freight carriers.
- March 21 – (United States) Consolidated Model 28, more commonly known as the PBY Catalina (U.S. Navy designation) – an American multi-role flying boat and amphibious aircraft designed by Consolidated Aircraft in the 1930s and 1940s. It was one of the most widely used seaplanes of World War II. Catalinas served with every branch of the United States Armed Forces and in the air forces and navies of many other nations. The Catalinas in Australian service with the RAAF were also used for delivering medical supplies, courier duties and bringing POWs home post-war. Also the Soviet Union used the Catalina models for cargo early on. The last military PBYs served until the 1980s. Catalinas were also used for commercial air travel, for passengers, mail and cargo, both during and after World War II, serving roles from urgent military supply delivery (like medical aid) to post-war civilian passenger/freight transport for airlines like Qantas and Cathay Pacific, thanks to its versatile amphibious design.
- December 17 – (United States) Douglas DC-3 – a propeller-driven airliner that was manufactured by the Douglas Aircraft Company. From 1936 through World War II and into the 1950s, it had a lasting effect on the worldwide airline industry, where it was used for passenger as well as cargo/mail transport. In the same period, the aircraft was alo widely used as a military transport plane. In the 2020s a limited number of DC-3s are still in active commercial and military service.

=== 1936 ===
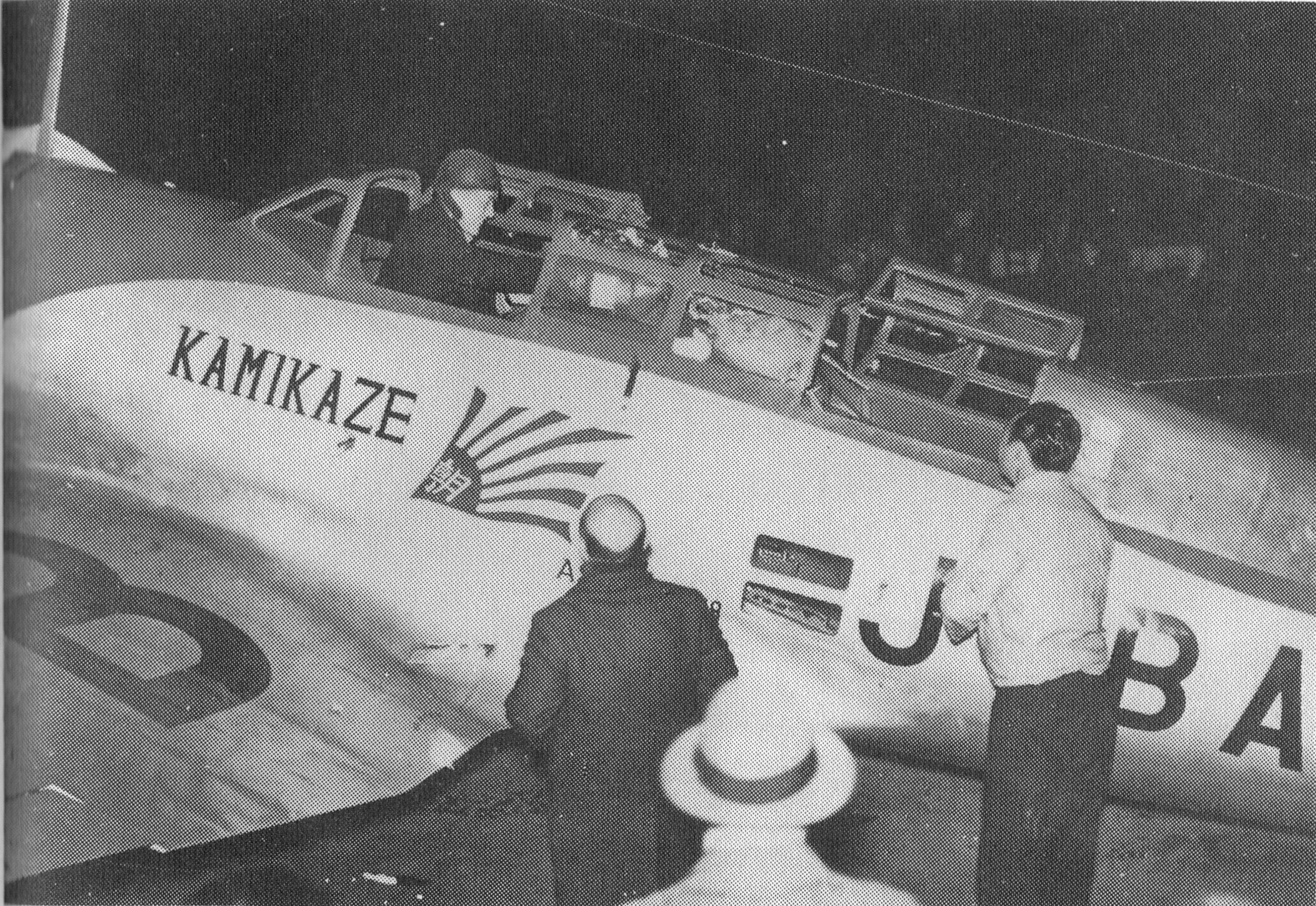
Mitsubishi Ki-15, Kamikaze, the first Japanese-built airplane to fly to Europe and caused a sensation in 1937 by making the flight between Tokyo and London, for the coronation of King George VI and Queen Elizabeth, between 6 April 1937 and 9 April 1937 in a flight time of 51 hours, 17 minutes and 23 seconds, a world record at the time.

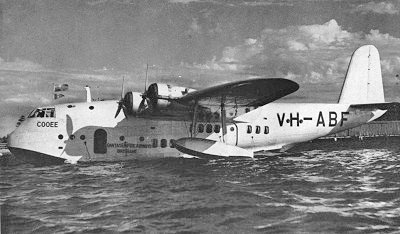
Short S.23 Flying Boat (VH-ABF) Cooee, Qantas Empire Airways, late 1930s.

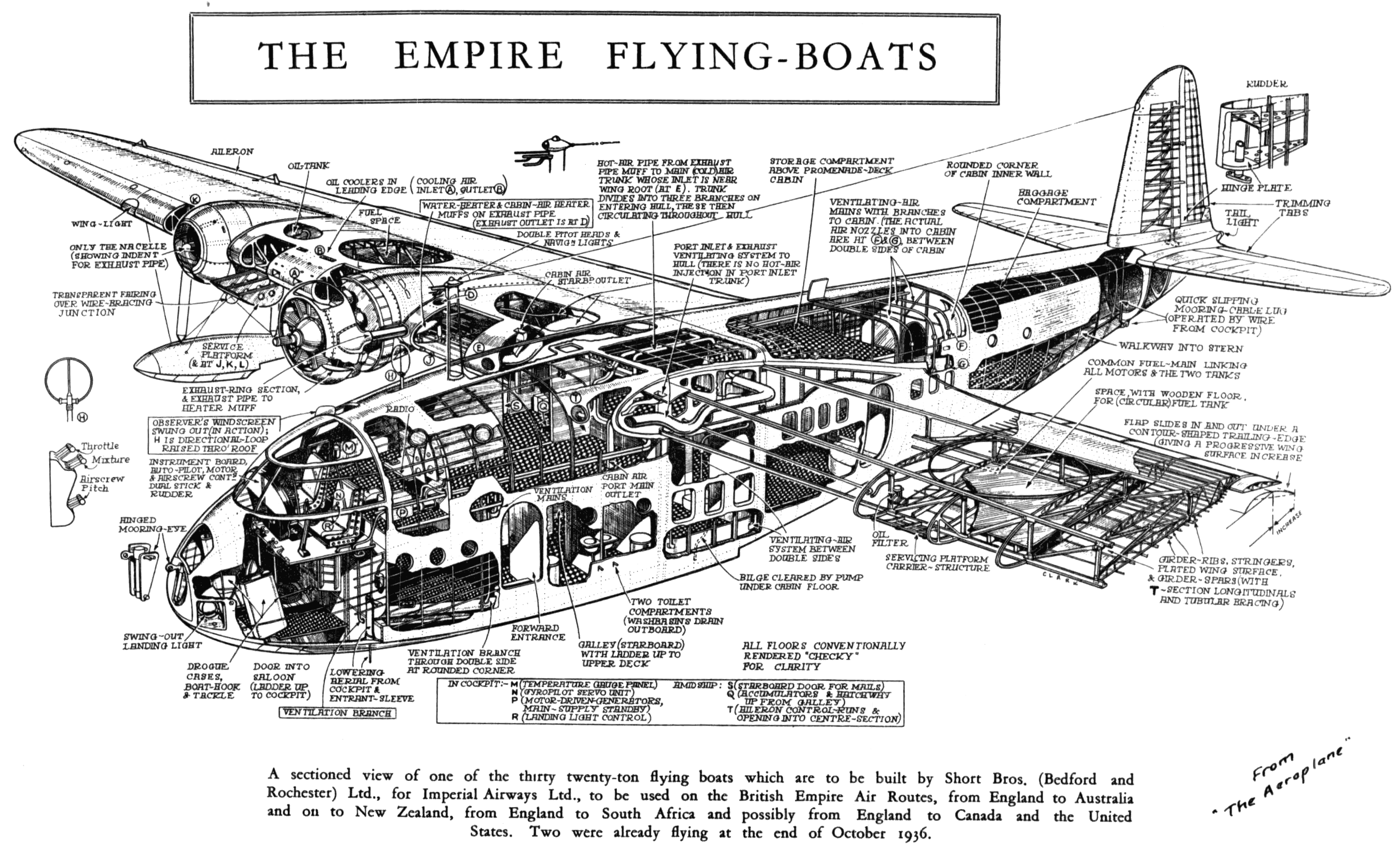
Short Empire detail 5 NACA-AC-204

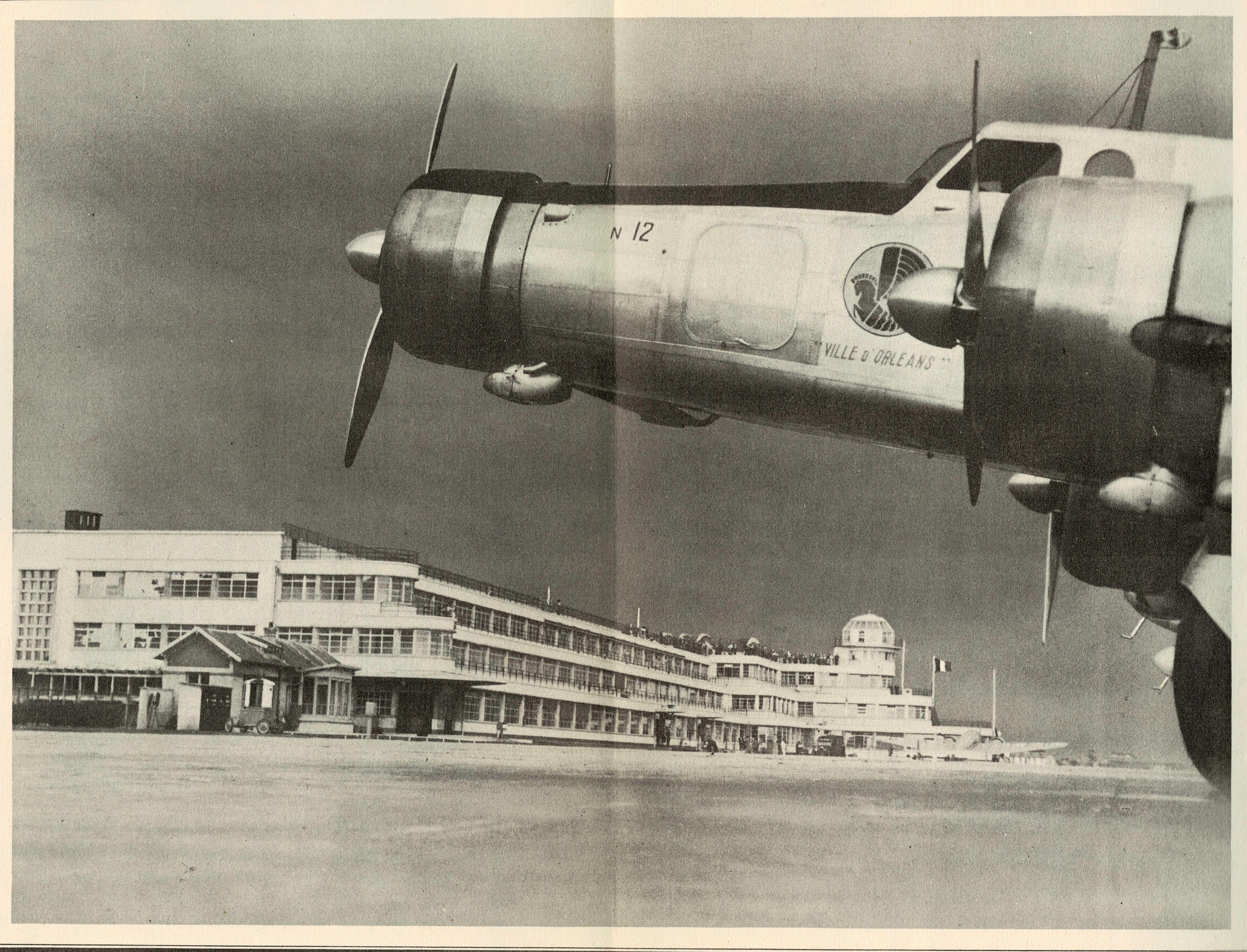
Dewoitine 338, Air France, 1939, Le Bourget

- Undated – (France) Bloch MB.220 – a French twin-engine passenger transport airplane built by Société des Avions Marcel Bloch during the 1930s, used by Air France on its European passenger/mail routes.
- May – (Japan) Mitsubishi Ki-15 – a Japanese reconnaissance aircraft and a light attack bomber of the Second Sino-Japanese War and Pacific War. It began as a fast civilian mail-plane used by various civilian operators.
- June 27 – (United States) Lockheed Model 12 Electra Junior, more commonly known as the Lockheed 12 or L-12 – an eight-seat, six-passenger all-metal twin-engine transport aircraft of the late 1930s designed for use by small airlines, companies, and wealthy private individuals. A smaller version of the Lockheed Model 10 Electra, the Lockheed 12 was not popular as an airliner but was widely used as a corporate and government transport as well as a military transport.
- July 3 – (United Kingdom) Short Empire – a four-engined monoplane transport flying boat, designed and developed by Short Brothers during the 1930s to meet the requirements of the British Empire, specifically to provide passenger/mail air service from the UK to South Africa, Singapore and Australia in stages. It was developed in parallel with the Short Sunderland maritime patrol bomber, which served in the Second World War along with the piggy-back Short Mayo Composite. Mail was primarily carried in a designated long compartment on the upper deck, located aft of the cockpit (which was called the "bridge").
- August 9 – (France) Dewoitine D.338 – a 1930s French 22-passenger airliner built by Dewoitine. The D.338 was a late-1930s French airliner and served on long-distance routes. When World War II began it was pressed into military service. The mail (and other freight/baggage) was carried in two dedicated cargo/luggage compartments, one located in the nose of the aircraft (behind the nose-mounted engine firewall, accessible only externally.) and another in the rear of the aircraft (behind the passenger cabin, adjacent to the toilet).
- September 12 – (United Kingdom) Gloster Gladiator – a British biplane fighter. It was used by the Royal Air Force (RAF) and the Fleet Air Arm (FAA) (as the Sea Gladiator variant) and was exported to a number of other air forces during the late 1930s. As it was superseded by more modern monoplane fighters like the Hawker Hurricane and Supermarine Spitfire, the Gladiator was relegated to secondary duties from around 1943 onward. These duties, especially in the Middle East and other less active areas, included meteorological flights (met recce) and general communications/liaison work, which required the transport of small payloads, mail, or personnel between airfields.
- October – (Germany) Blohm & Voss Ha 139 – a four-engined, all-metal, inverted gull wing floatplane, designed and built by the German aircraft manufacturer Blohm & Voss, employed by Deutsche Luft Hansa for long mail routes (e.g., to South America).
- December 9 – (Germany) Heinkel He 116 – an extremely long-range mail plane designed and produced by the German aircraft manufacturer Heinkel.

=== 1937 ===
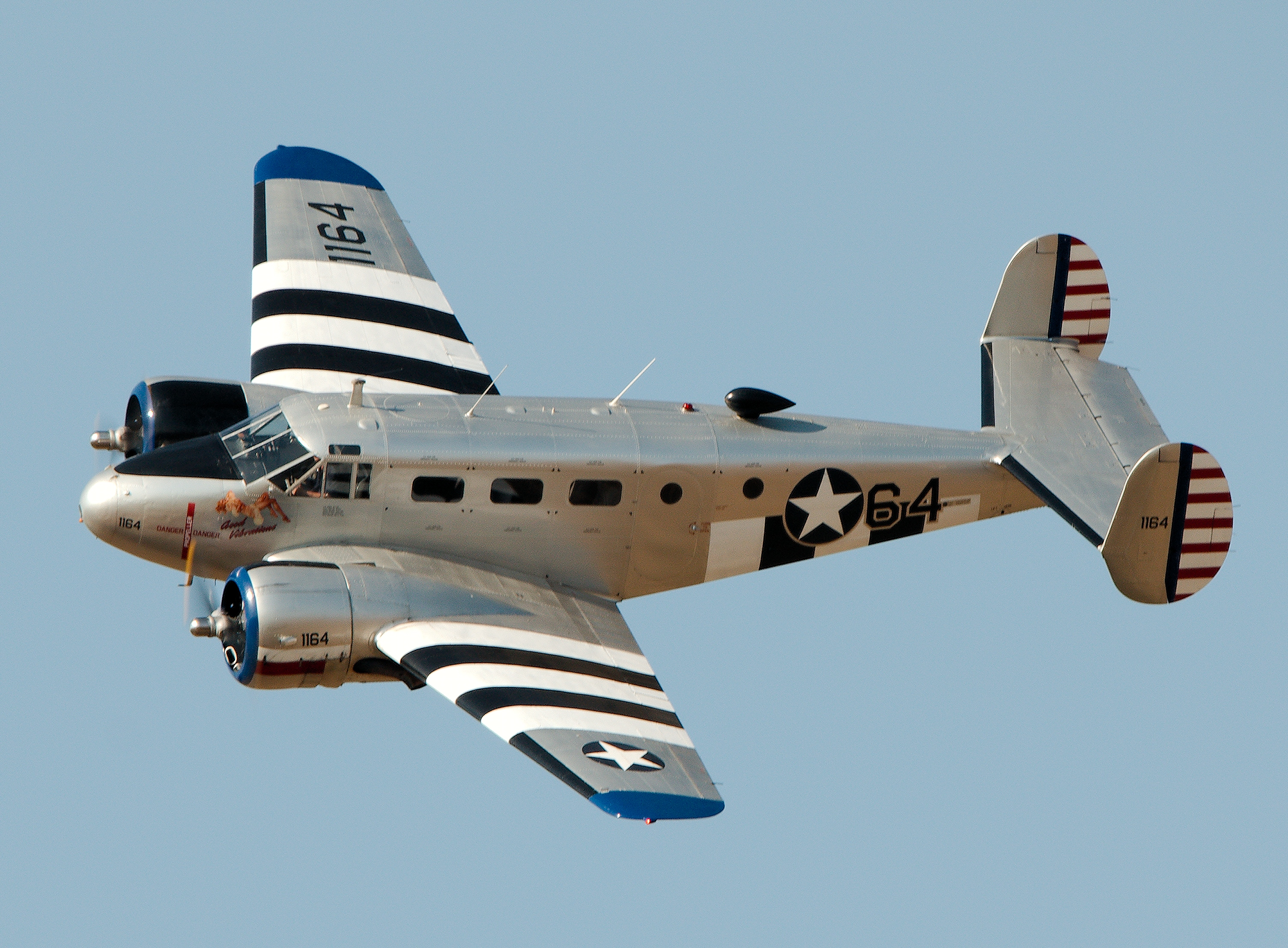
Beech 18 – Little Gransden 2019

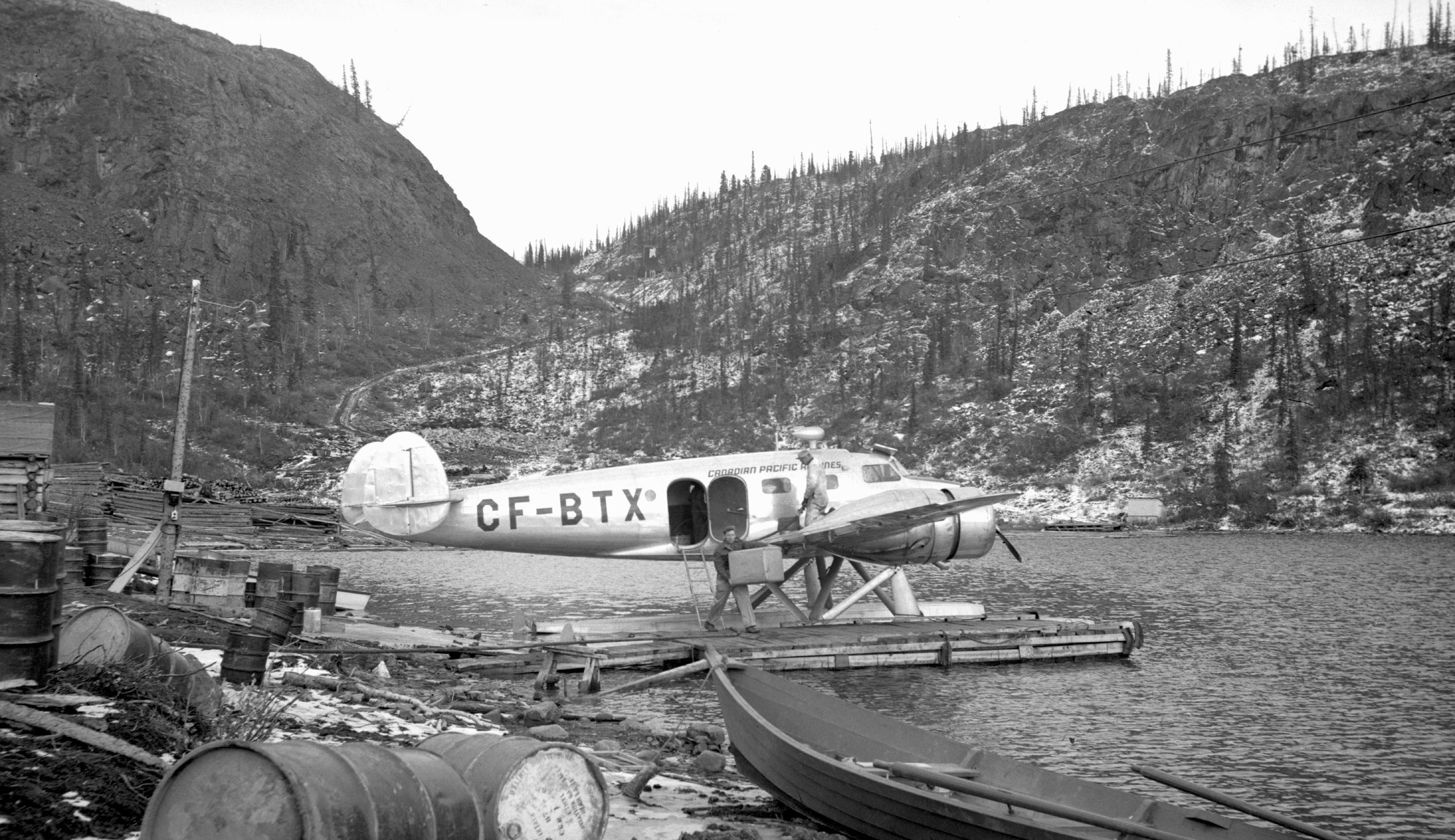
Barkley-Grow T8P-1 CF-BTX of Canadian Pacific Airlines at dock in Port Radium, circa 1940–1945

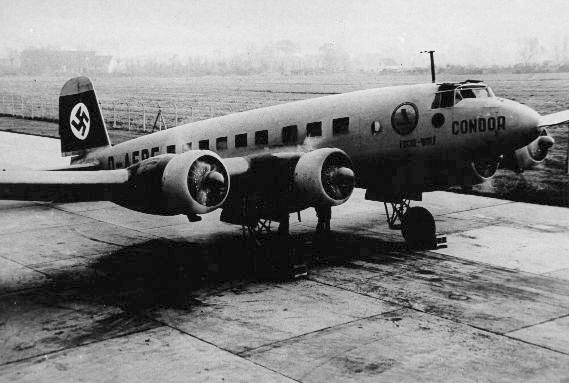
Focke-Wulf Fw 200

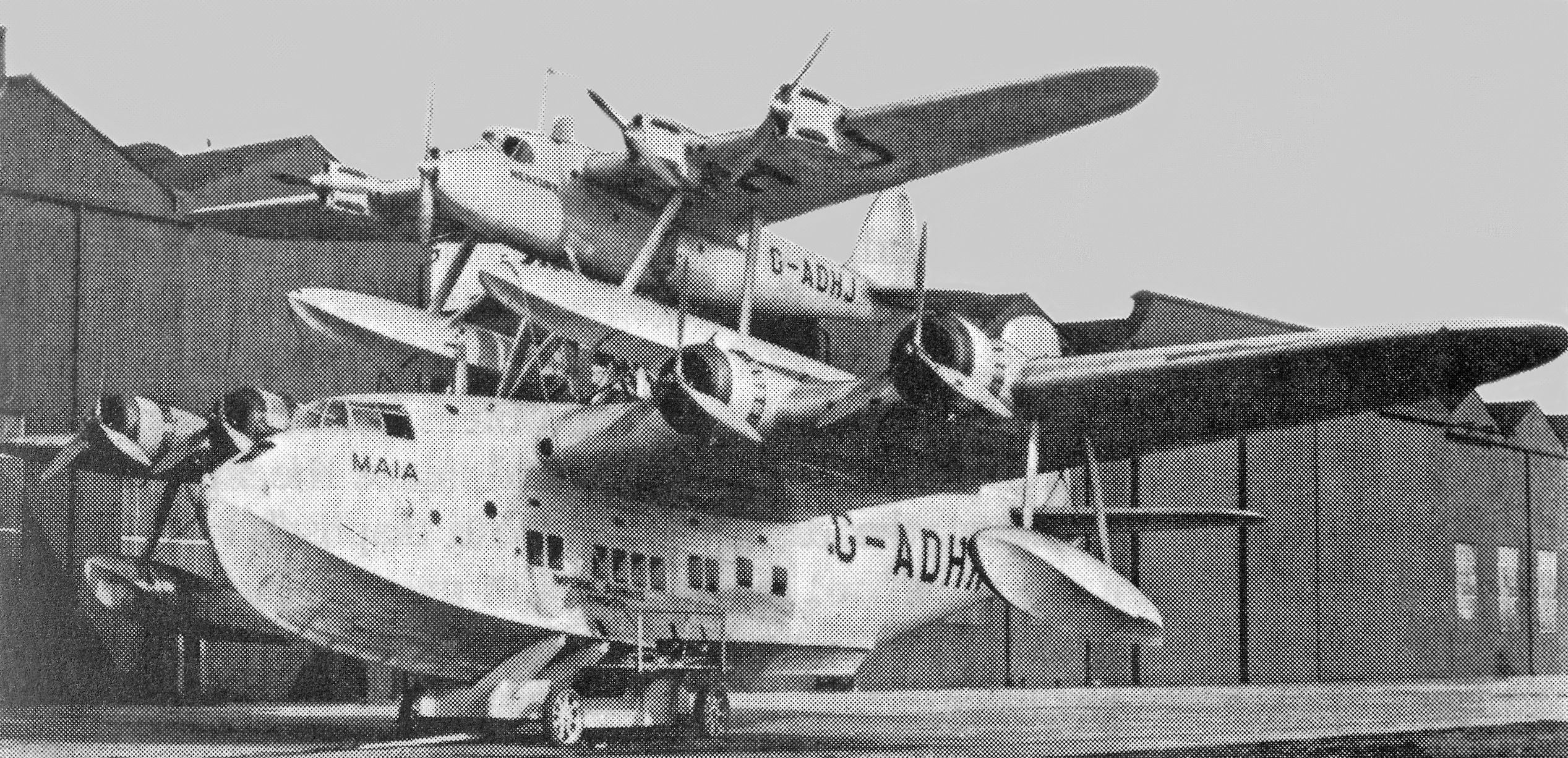
Short-Mayo-CHB301

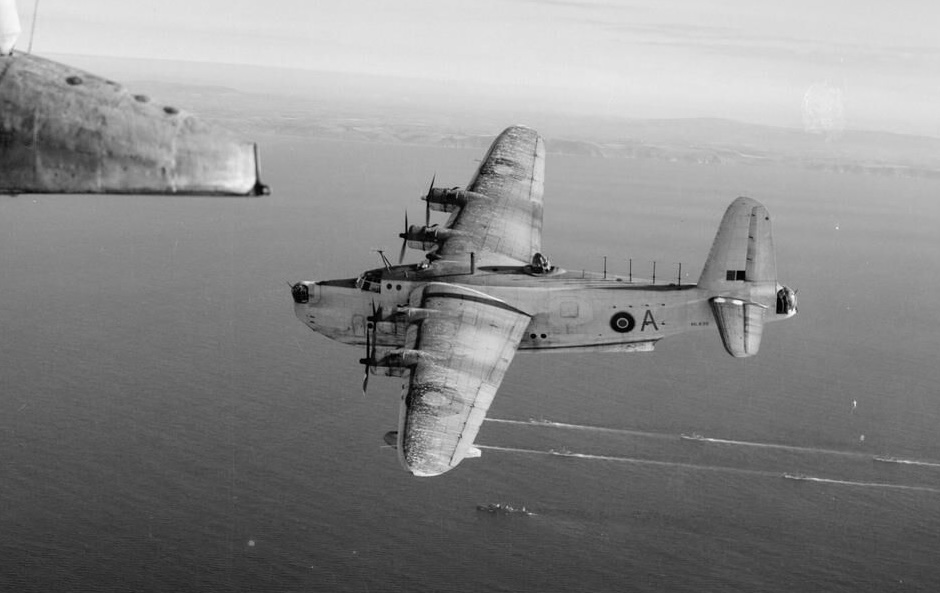
Aircraft of the Royal Air Force 1939-1945- Short S.25 Sunderland CH21574 (cropped)

- Undated – (Italy) Savoia-Marchetti SM.75 Marsupiale (Italian: marsupial) – an Italian passenger and military transport aircraft of the 1930s and 1940s. It was a low-wing, trimotor monoplane of mixed metal and wood construction with a retractable tailwheel undercarriage. It was the last of a line of transport aeroplanes that Alessandro Marchetti began designing in the early 1930s. The SM.75 was fast, robust, capable of long-range flight and could carry up to 24 passengers for 1,000 miles (1,600 km). Used for Ala Littoria airmail routes to East Africa.
- January 15 – (United States) Beechcraft Model 18 (or "Twin Beech") – a 6- to 11-seat, twin-engined, low-wing, tailwheel light aircraft manufactured by the Beech Aircraft Corporation of Wichita, Kansas. Sold worldwide as a civilian executive, utility, cargo aircraft, and passenger airliner with tailwheel- or nose wheel undercarriage, skis, or floats, it was also used as a military aircraft.
- April – (United States) Barkley-Grow T8P-1 – an airliner developed shortly before the Second World War. Although it saw limited production, the type was well-received as a bush plane in Canada.
- July 27 – (Germany) Focke-Wulf Fw 200 Condor, also known as Kurier (German for courier) to the Allies – an all-metal four-engined monoplane, initially designed and produced by the German aircraft manufacturer Focke-Wulf as an airliner. It was the first heavier-than-air craft to fly nonstop between Berlin and New York City, about 4,000 miles (6,400 km), making the flight from Berlin-Staaken to Floyd Bennett Field on 10/11 August 1938 in 24 hours and 56 minutes. Civilian Fw 200 were operated by Deutsche Luft Hansa, Det Danske Luftfartselskab, Syndicato Condor (the latter being Luft Hansa's Brazilian subsidiary), Cruzeiro do Sul, and the British Overseas Airways Corporation. The outbreak of the Second World War prevented the fulfilment of further civil orders for the type.
- July 29 – (United States) Lockheed Model 14 Super Electra – an American civil passenger and cargo aircraft built by the Lockheed Aircraft Corporation during the late 1930s. An outgrowth of the earlier Model 10 Electra, the Model 14 was also developed into larger, more capable civil and military versions. Two Japanese versions were built:
  - (Japan) Tachikawa Type LO Transport Aircraft – Japanese licence production of the Model 14-38 by the Tachikawa Aircraft Company Ltd (119 production aircraft).
  - (Japan) Kawasaki Ki-56 – Freight transport aircraft redesigned by Takei Doi at Kawasaki Kokuki Kogoyo K.K. (Kawasaki Aircraft Company), from the Type LO (121 production aircraft). Careful attention to weight reduction, a 1.5 m (4 ft 11 in) increase in rear fuselage length and power from 2x 950 hp (710 kW) Nakajima Ha-25 14-cylinder radial engines improved performance and handling.
- August – (Japan) Nakajima Ki-19 / N-19 – an unsuccessful attempt by Nakajima Aircraft Company to meet a 1935 requirement issued by the Japanese government for a modern bomber to replace the Mitsubishi Ki-1 heavy bomber. One of the four prototypes was converted to a mail plane in April 1939; it got the new designation N-19.
- August 28 – (Germany) Junkers Ju 90 / Ju 290 - a four-engined airliner and transport aircraft designed and produced by the German aircraft manufacturer Junkers, intended for Deutsche Luft Hansa's transatlantic passenger/mail routes. Aft of the passenger compartments were Toilets, a cloakroom, and a storage space for airmail.
- September 5 – (United Kingdom) Short Mayo Composite – a piggy-back long-range mailplane/seaplane and flying boat combination produced by Short Brothers to provide a reliable long-range air transport service to North America and, potentially, to other distant places in the British Empire and the Commonwealth. Only one was built and in operational use with Imperial Airways.
- October 16 – (United Kingdom) Short S.25 Sunderland / Hythe – a British flying boat patrol bomber, developed and constructed by Short Brothers for the Royal Air Force (RAF). In late 1942, the British Overseas Airways Corporation (BOAC) obtained six Sunderland Mark IIIs, which had been de-militarised on the production line, for service as mail carriers to Nigeria and India, with accommodation for either 22 passengers with 2 tons of freight or 16 passengers with 3 tons of freight. Six more Sunderland IIIs were obtained in 1943. In late 1944, the RNZAF acquired four new Sunderland Mk IIIs already configured for transport duties. In the immediate postwar period, these were used by New Zealand's National Airways Corporation to link South Pacific Islands in the "Coral Route" before TEAL Short Sandringhams took over after 1947. At the war's end BOAC obtained more Mark IIIs and gradually came up with better accommodation for its passengers, in three configurations named Hythe.

=== 1938 ===
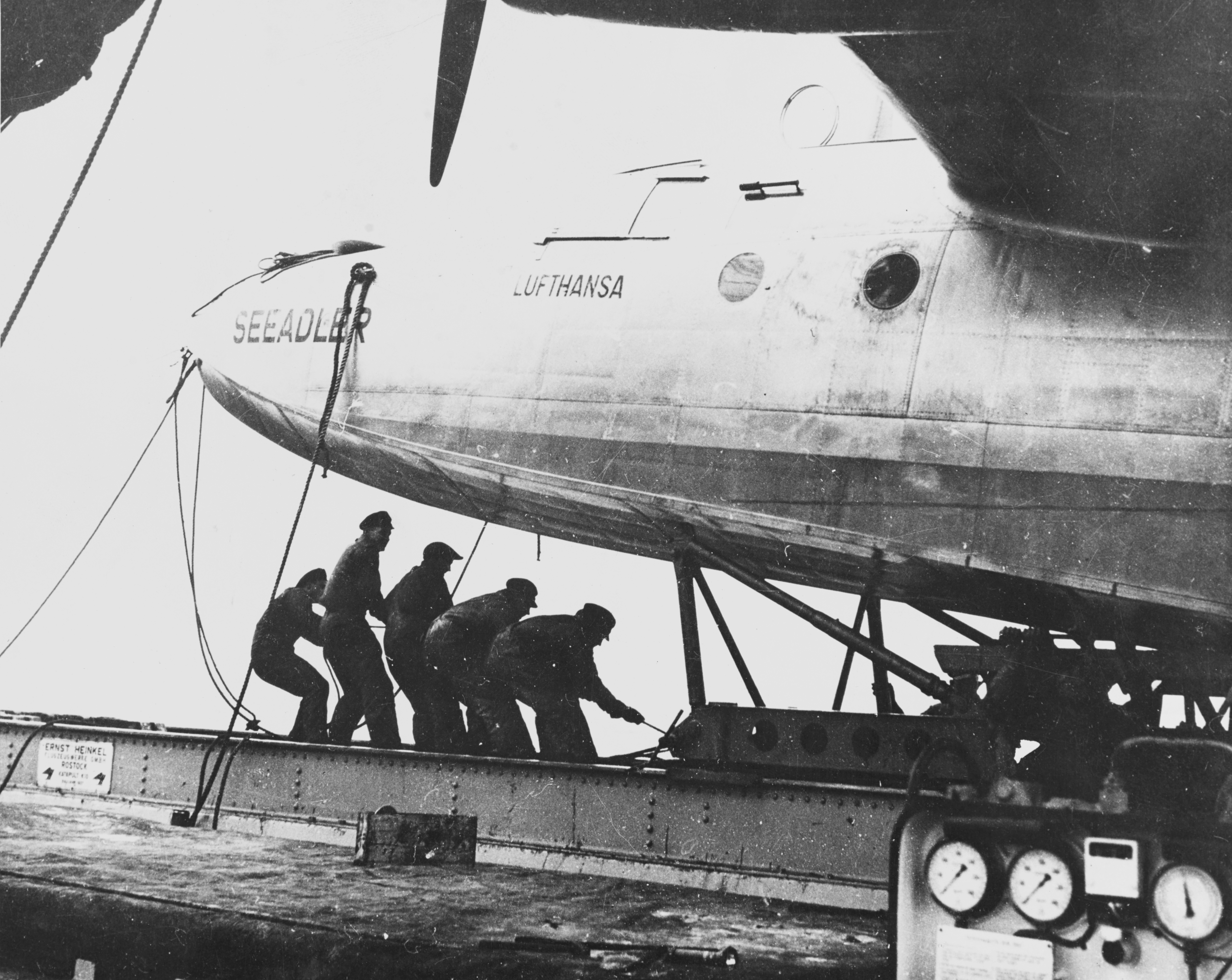
Dornier Do 26 V1 on a catapult ship in the South Atlantic c1939

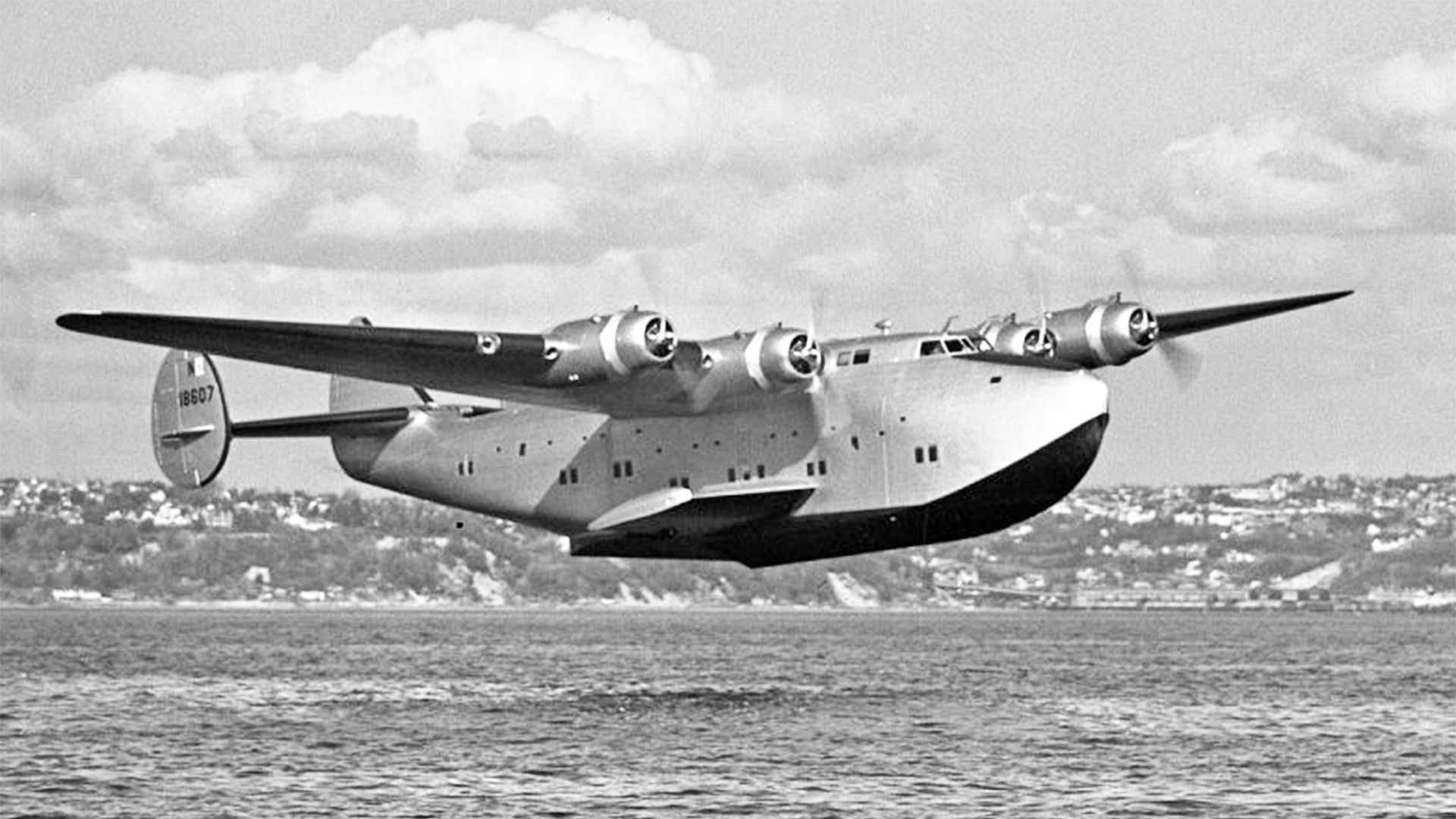
Boeing Model 314 Clipper

- May 21 – (Germany) Dornier Do 26 – an all-metal gull-winged flying boat produced before and during World War II by Dornier Flugzeugwerke. Deutsche Luft Hansa ordered three aircraft, which were designed to be launched by catapult from special supply ships, for transatlantic air mail purposes.
- June 7 – (United States) Boeing Model 314 Clipper – The very large, long-range flying boat Boeing 314 (Pan Am's transoceanic flying boat) quickly became a key vehicle for transoceanic passenger + mail carriage (commercial operations started in 1939). Its scale and range were milestones for long-haul passenger as well as airmail/cargo potential.
- October 11 – (Germany) Blohm & Voss Ha 142 – a four-engined long-distance monoplane designed and built by the German aircraft manufacturer Blohm & Voss. It was developed as a land-based derivative of the Ha 139 seaplane. The Ha 142 was briefly trialled by Deutsche Luft Hansa as a mail transport. It was never placed into regular service with the operator, in part due to the outbreak of the Second World War shortly thereafter.

=== 1939 ===
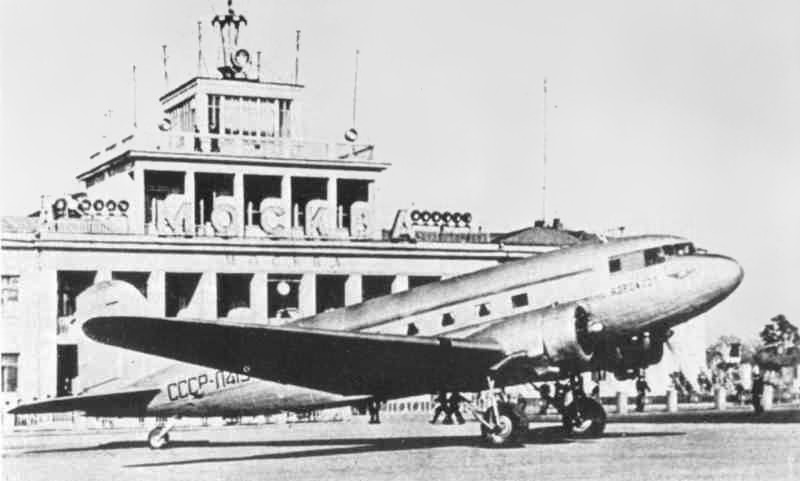
An Aeroflot PS-84 (Lisunov Li-2)

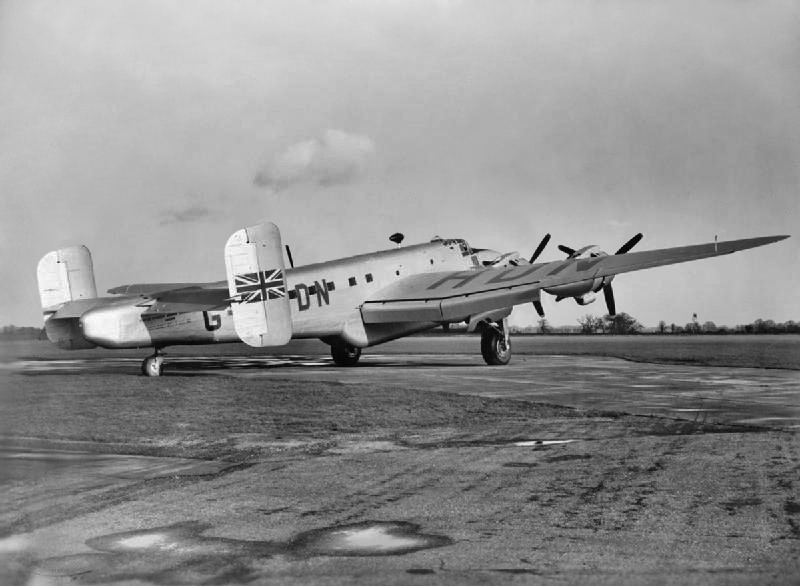
Handley Page Halton

- Undated – (Germany) DFS 230 – a German transport glider operated by the Luftwaffe in World War II. It was developed in 1933 by the Deutsche Forschungsanstalt für Segelflug (DFS – "German Research Institute for Sailplane Flight") with Hans Jacobs as the head designer. The glider was the German inspiration for the British Hotspur glider and was intended for (and later used in) airborne assault operations.
- Undated – (Soviet Union) Lisunov Li-2, originally designated PS-84, was a license-built Soviet version of the Douglas DC-3. It was produced by Factory No. 84 in Moscow-Khimki and, after the factory's evacuation in 1941, at the Tashkent Aviation Production Association in Tashkent.
- October 25 – (United Kingdom) Handley Page Halifax / Halton – a British Royal Air Force (RAF) four-engined heavy bomber of the Second World War later modified for civil use. A number of former RAF Halifax C.8s were sold from 1945 and used as Handley Page Halton freighters by a number of mostly British airlines. In 1948, 41 civilian Halifax freighters were used during the Berlin Air Lift, operating 4,653 sorties carrying freight and 3,509 carrying bulk diesel fuel. Nine aircraft were lost during the airlift. The low-cost airline business pioneer Freddie Laker bought and serviced war-surplus Halifaxes for Bond Air Services operations in the Berlin airlift. With the airfreight market in decline, most of the civilian Halifaxes were scrapped on their return to England. The last civilian-operated Halifaxes were withdrawn from service in late 1952.

== Technical advances ==
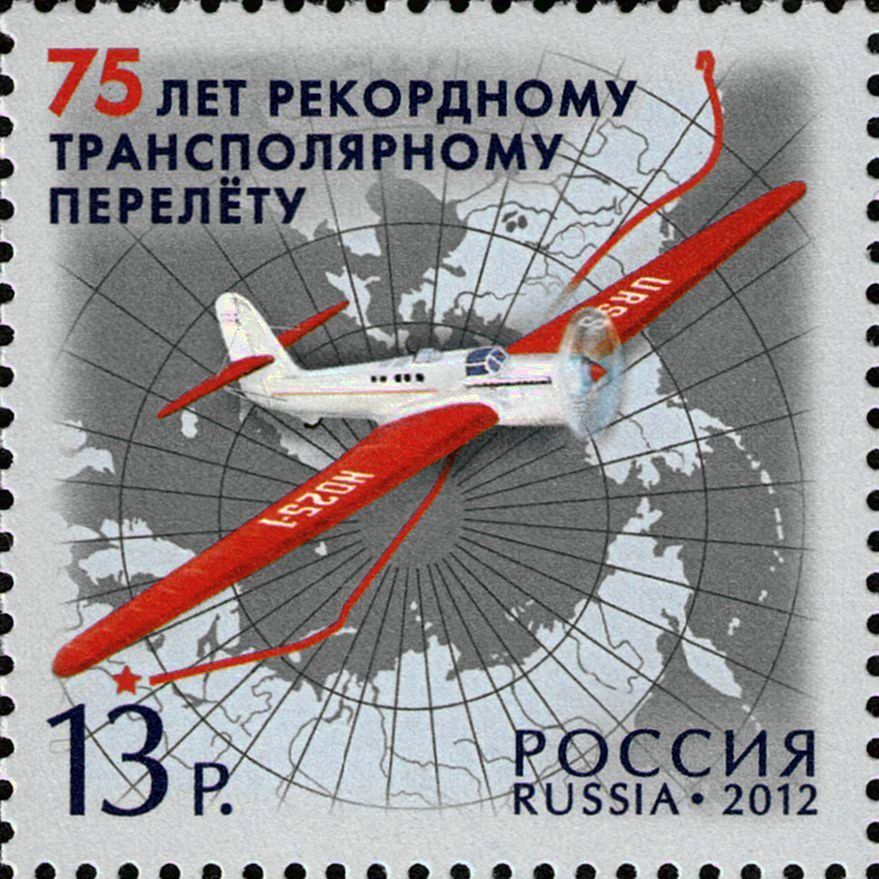
Commemorative stamp illustration of the transpolar flight from Moscow to San Jacinto, California with a Tupolev ANT-25

The air cargo and airmail events of this decade took place concurrently with several technical advances:

- By 1930 radio aids were being deployed alongside the visual beacon network, a crucial advance that made night and all-weather airmail/cargo operations more reliable.
- The decade saw the development of air traffic control, with dispatchers managing traffic and coordinating arrivals/departures, transitioning from airline control to dedicated Airway Traffic Control Offices (ATCOs) by the mid-1930s.
- February 26, 1935 – (United Kingdom) Robert Watson-Watt and Arnold Wilkins ran the Daventry experiment and moved to Orford Ness in May for further tests that led to the first working radar systems. Radar's birth in 1935 rapidly improved ground-based aircraft detection and navigation aids. For air cargo / airmail this would lead to better en-route safety, weather/traffic awareness and (in wartime) the ability to protect air-supply corridors and organise large-scale air logistics.
- In 1936 and 1937 in the Soviet Union three non-stop flight distance records were set, including the first transpolar flight, by crews flying the experimental Tupolev ANT-25. In 1938 the records were broken again by two British Vickers Wellesley bombers flying from Egypt to Darwin, Australia (a third aircraft landed on the island of Timor north of Darwin to refuel).
- May 1, 1937 Lockheed XC-35 first flight (pressurized cabin research aircraft). The XC-35 was an early pressurized-cabin research transport (derived from the Lockheed Model 10 Electra)and pioneered foundational tech for higher-altitude, faster and more reliable long-range transport, affecting future cargo/passenger routings and comfort.
- August 23, 1937 – (United States) First completely automatic (blind) landing demonstrated with a Fokker Y1C-14B. An early autoland/radio-beacon guided landing demonstration at Patterson Field and a technical milestone for instrument-aided operations that later improved schedule reliability for both passenger and cargo/airmail services.

== Pictures from the decade ==
air cargo and airmail in the decade 1930-1939

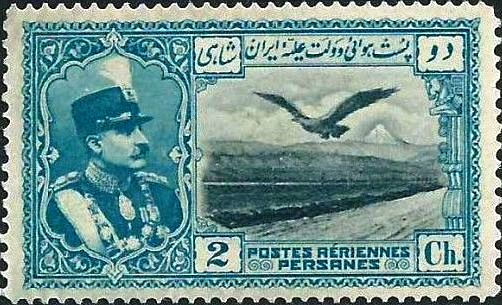
Iranian State Airlines stamp, 1930s.

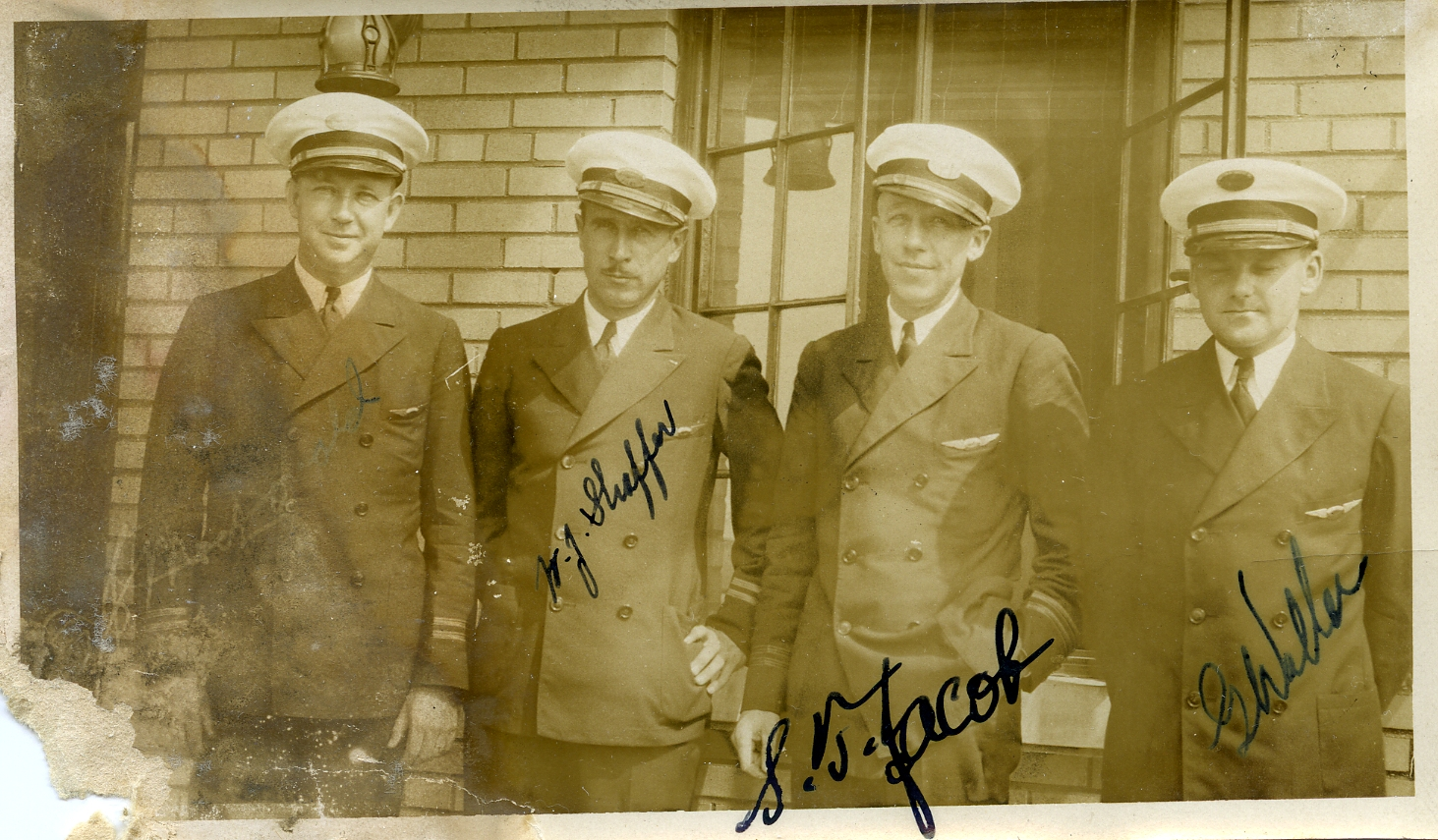
Four pilots 1930s. It appears to have been from someone’s small collection of First Flight Airmail letters, pilots and planes. They were being thrown out because of water damage. Historically Important.

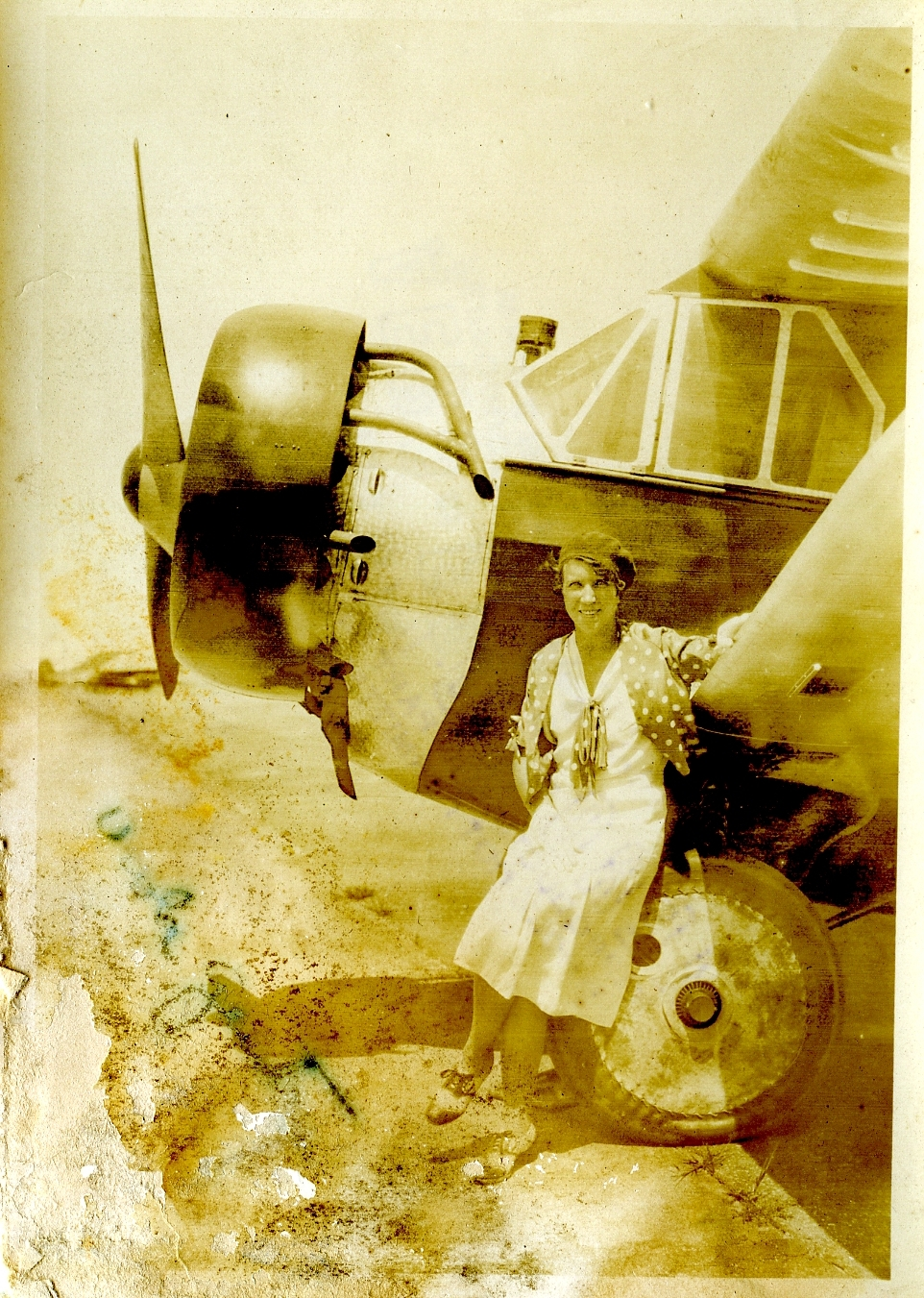
Female pilot 1930s. It appears to have been from someone’s small collection of First Flight Airmail letters, pilots and planes. They were being thrown out because of water damage. Historically Important.

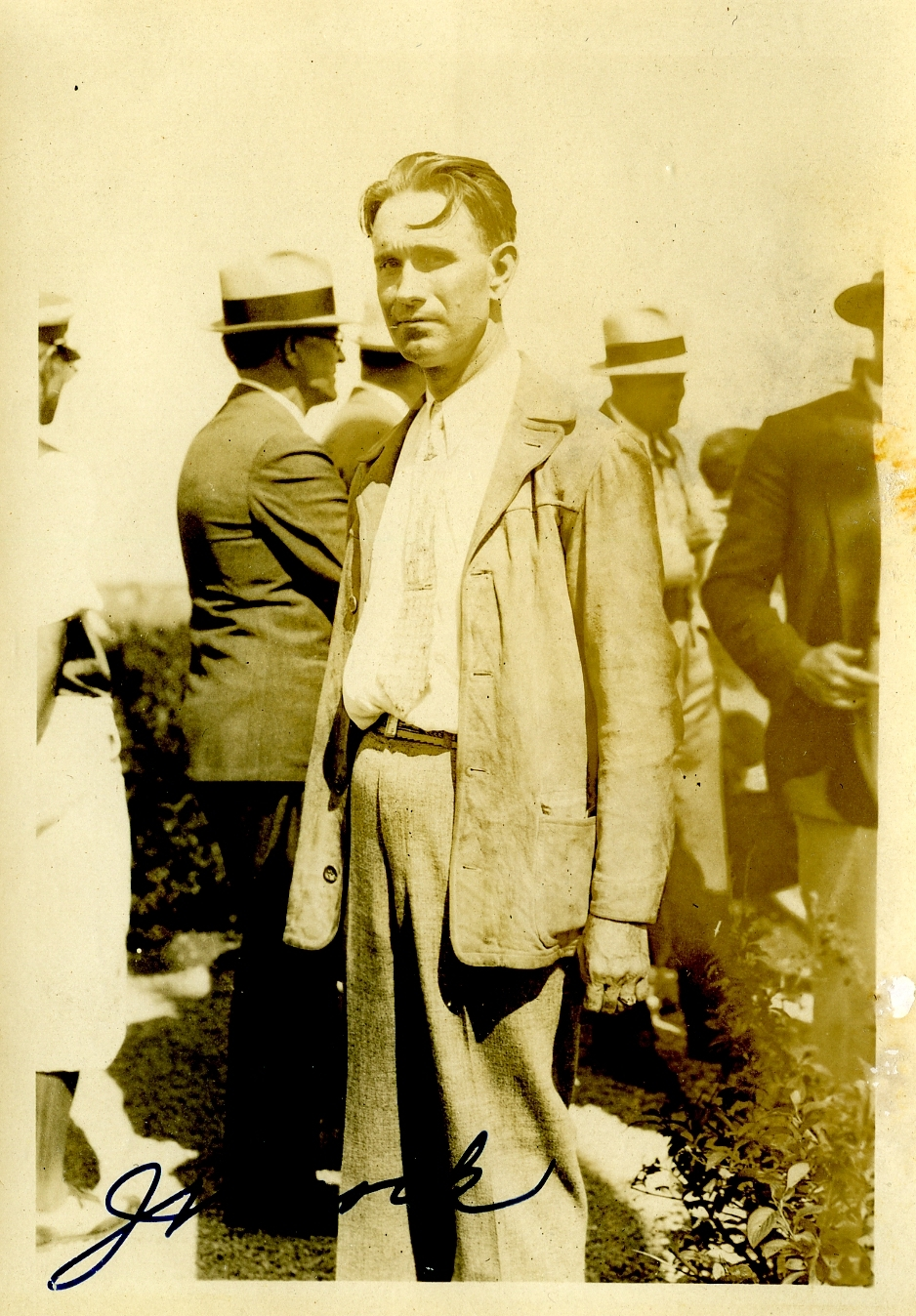
1930s Pilot Brock.

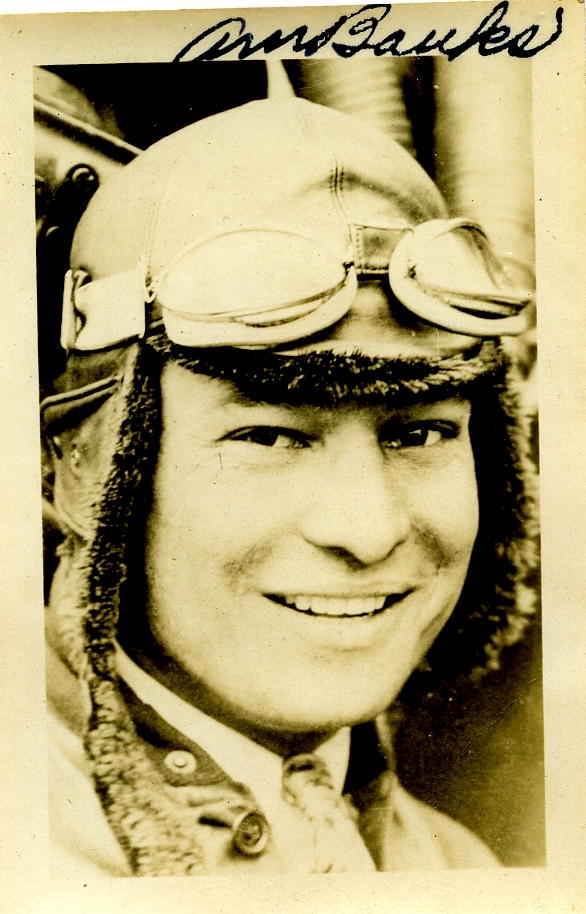
1930s Pilot Bauks. It appears to have been from someone’s small collection of First Flight Airmail letters, pilots and planes. They were being thrown out because of water damage. Historically Important.

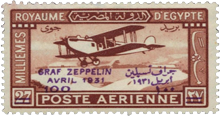
Egypt air mail- Graf Zeppelin 1931.

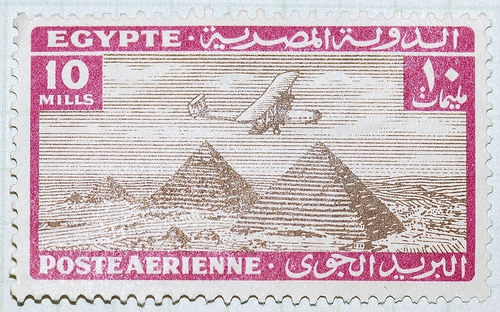
First Egypt-Rome air voyage stamp, 1933.

China Civilian airlines map 1934 (German language).

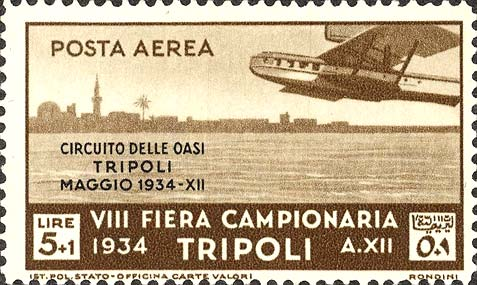
Italian Express stamp 1934: Seaplane and Tripoli coast.

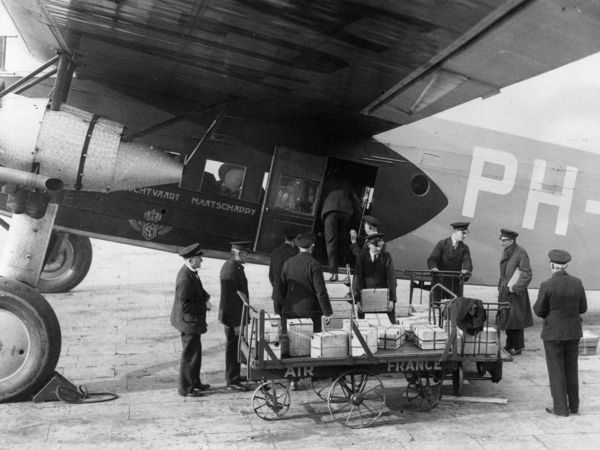
Russian gold being unloaded at Croydon Aerodrome, 1934.

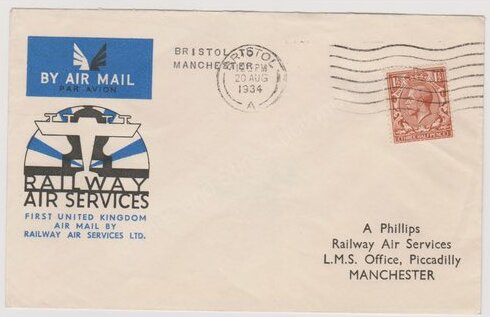
Railway Air Services printed envelope, 1934, for the Bristol to Manchester route, with a 1½d postage stamp. Postally marked "Bristol, 20 August 1934", and addressed to "A Phillips, Railway Air Services, L.M.S. Office, Piccadilly, Manchester".

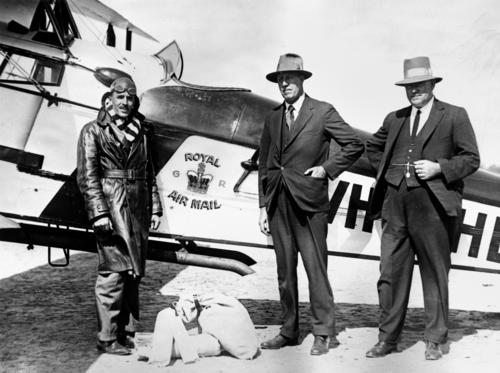
Royal Air Mail plane delivering the first mail to Rockhampton, Australia. Mayor Thomas J. Lee receiving Rockhampton's first air mail at Connor Park, January 1, 1935.

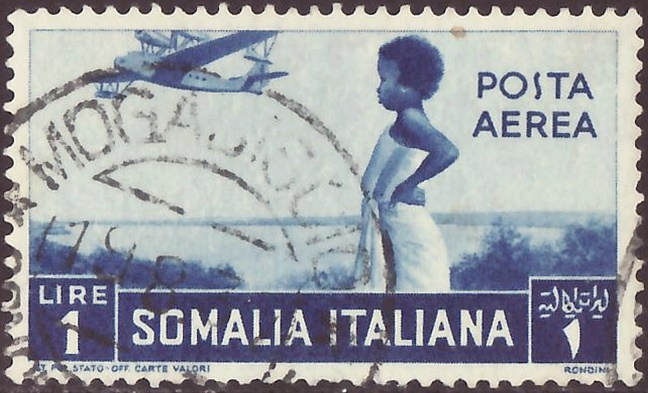
Stamp of Somalia Italiana; 1936; airmail stamp with girl and airplane; postmarked in Mogadishu (Italian: Mogadiscio), 1937.

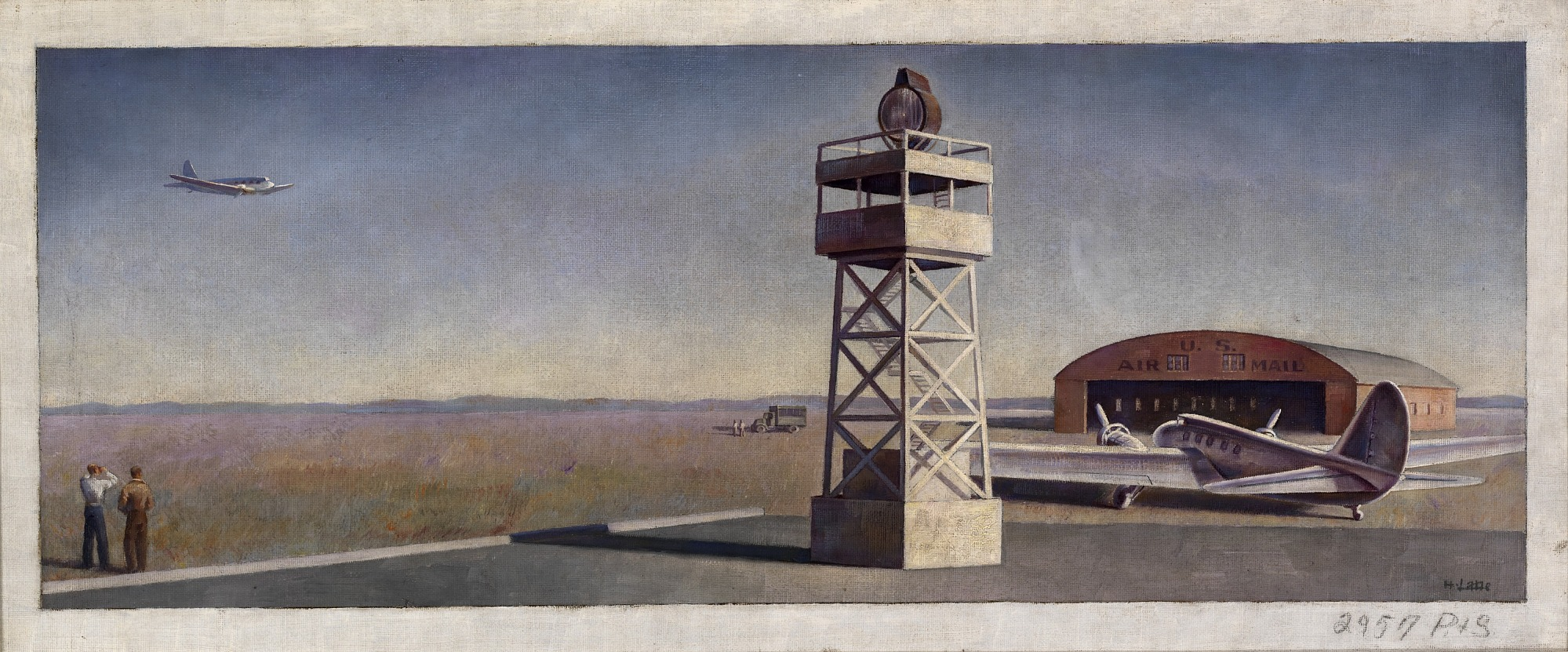
Harry Lane (1891–1973) - Air Express (mural study, Oakdale, Louisiana Post Office) Date circa 1938.

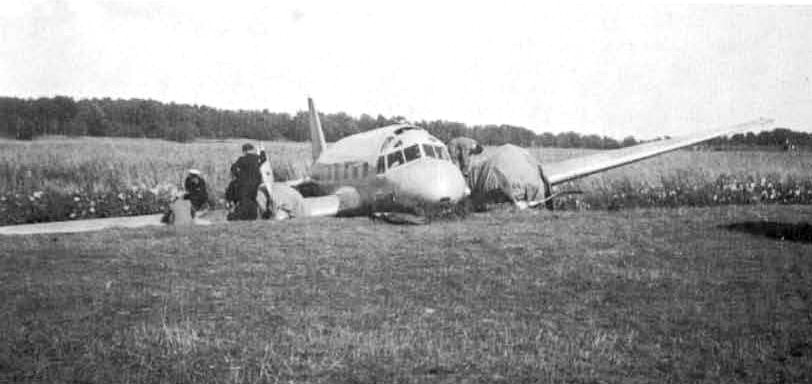
NT-35bis URSS-M131. The operator was the International Air Lines Administration of the Civil Air Fleet. The aircraft was manufactured in June 1937 and had Wright Cyclone G-2 engines. It was used on the Moscow-Stockholm route to transport passengers, diplomatic mail and urgent cargo. On August 19, 1938, the aircraft crashed in Sweden. Later, this aircraft was restored and again flew on domestic flights of the USSR.

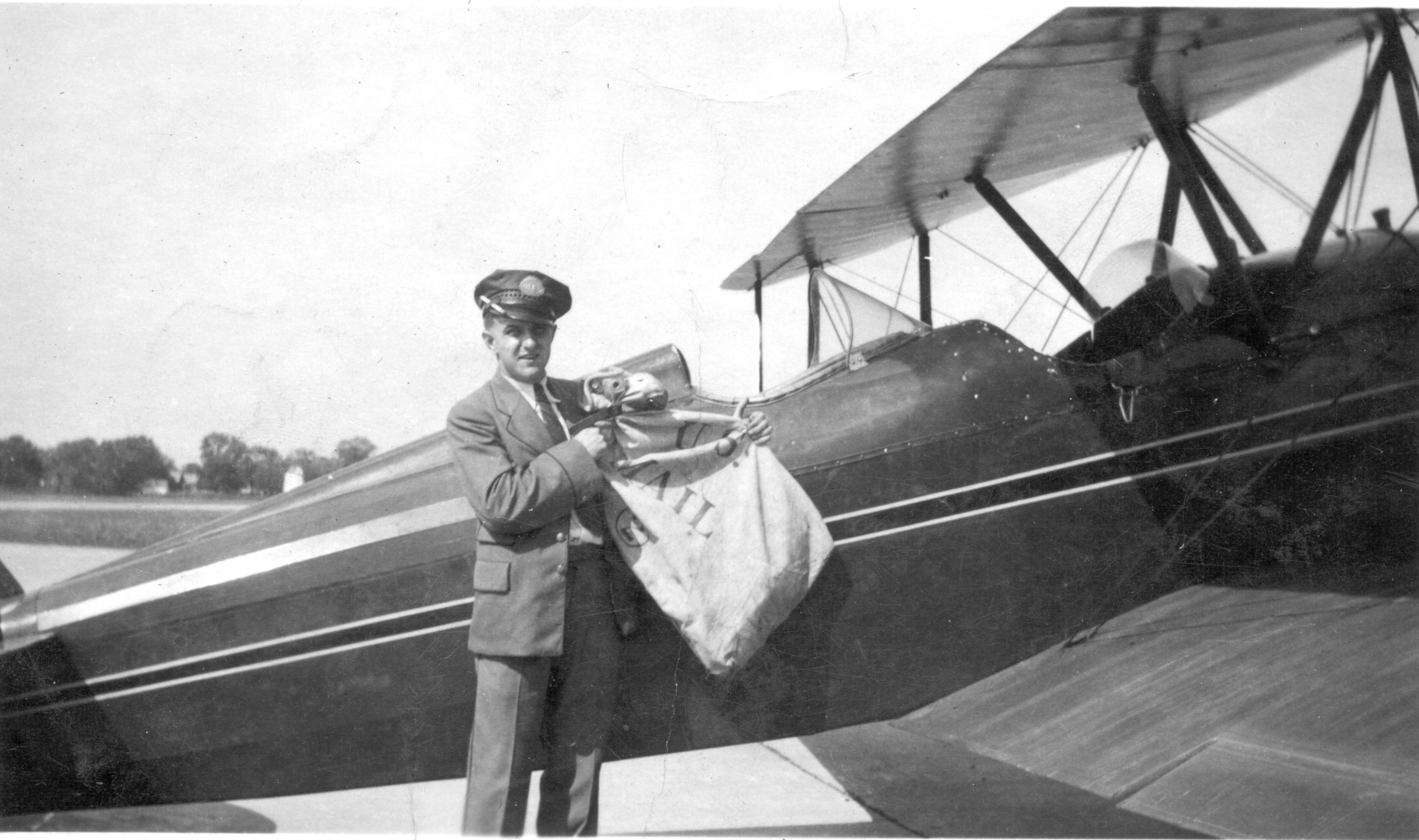
Marion Smykowski, loading airmail, Detroit USA, late 1930s.

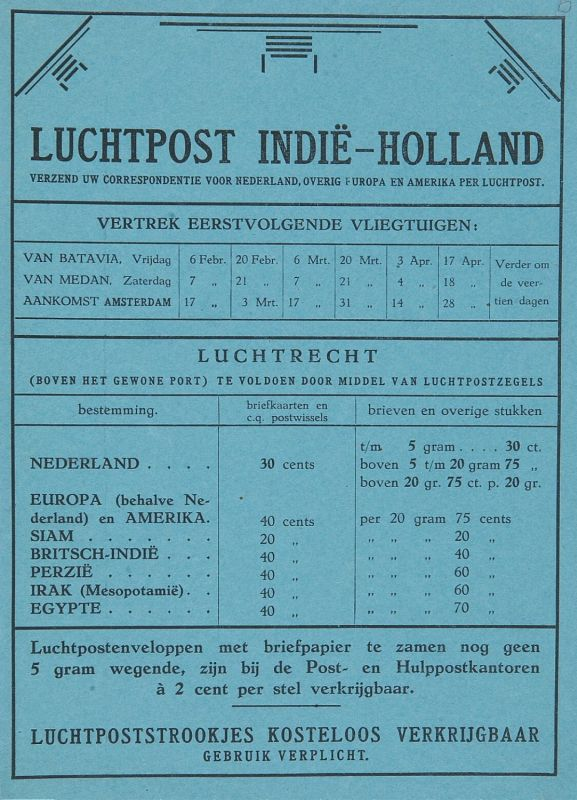
Advertisement card for airmail from the Dutch East Indies to the Netherlands, Europe, America and several countries on the route to the Netherlands. Dated before 1942.

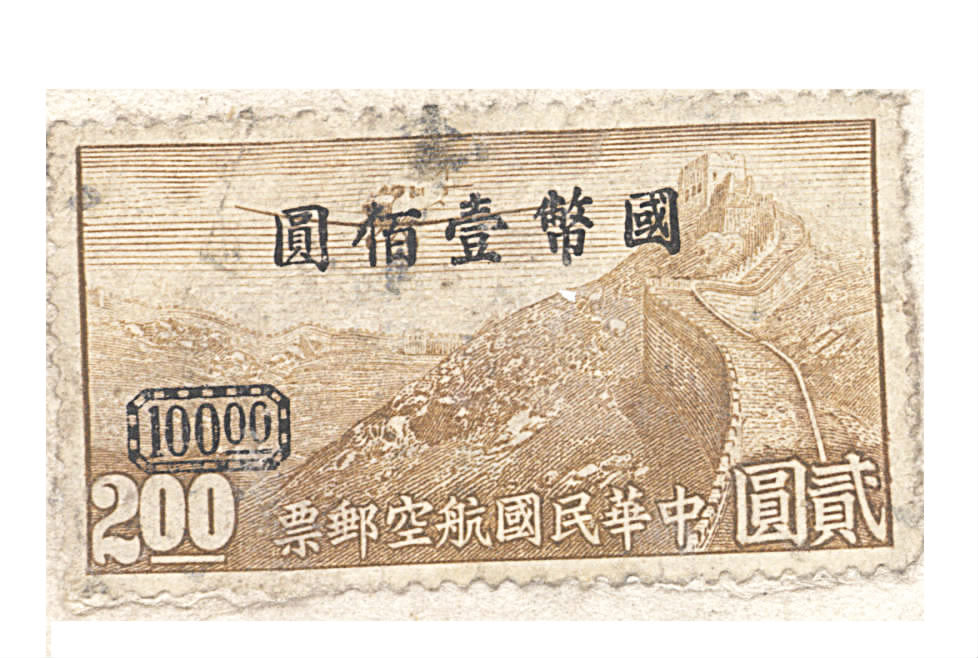
Chinese air mail stamp 1930s with a 1946 overprint.

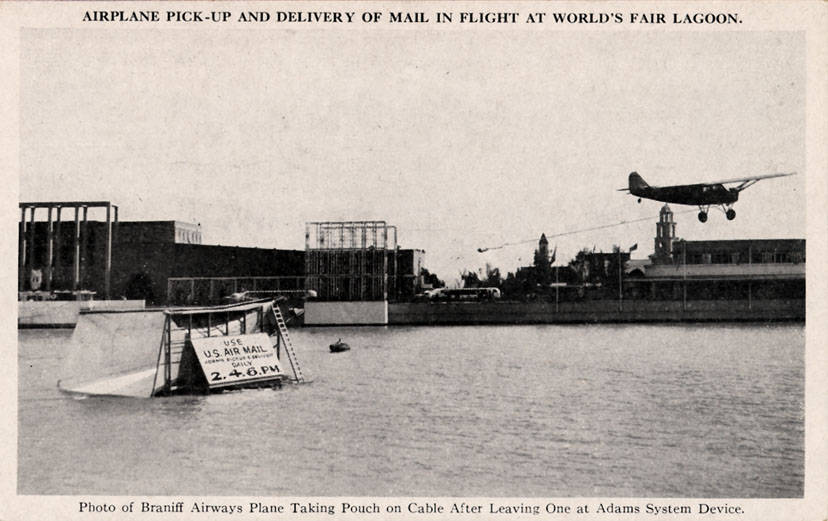
Airplane pick-up and delivery of mail in flight at Worlds Fair Lagoon, decade 1930-1939.

== See also ==
- Timeline of air cargo
- 1910s in air cargo
- 1920s in air cargo
- 1940s in air cargo
- 1950s in air cargo
- 1960s in air cargo
