= 1960s in air cargo =

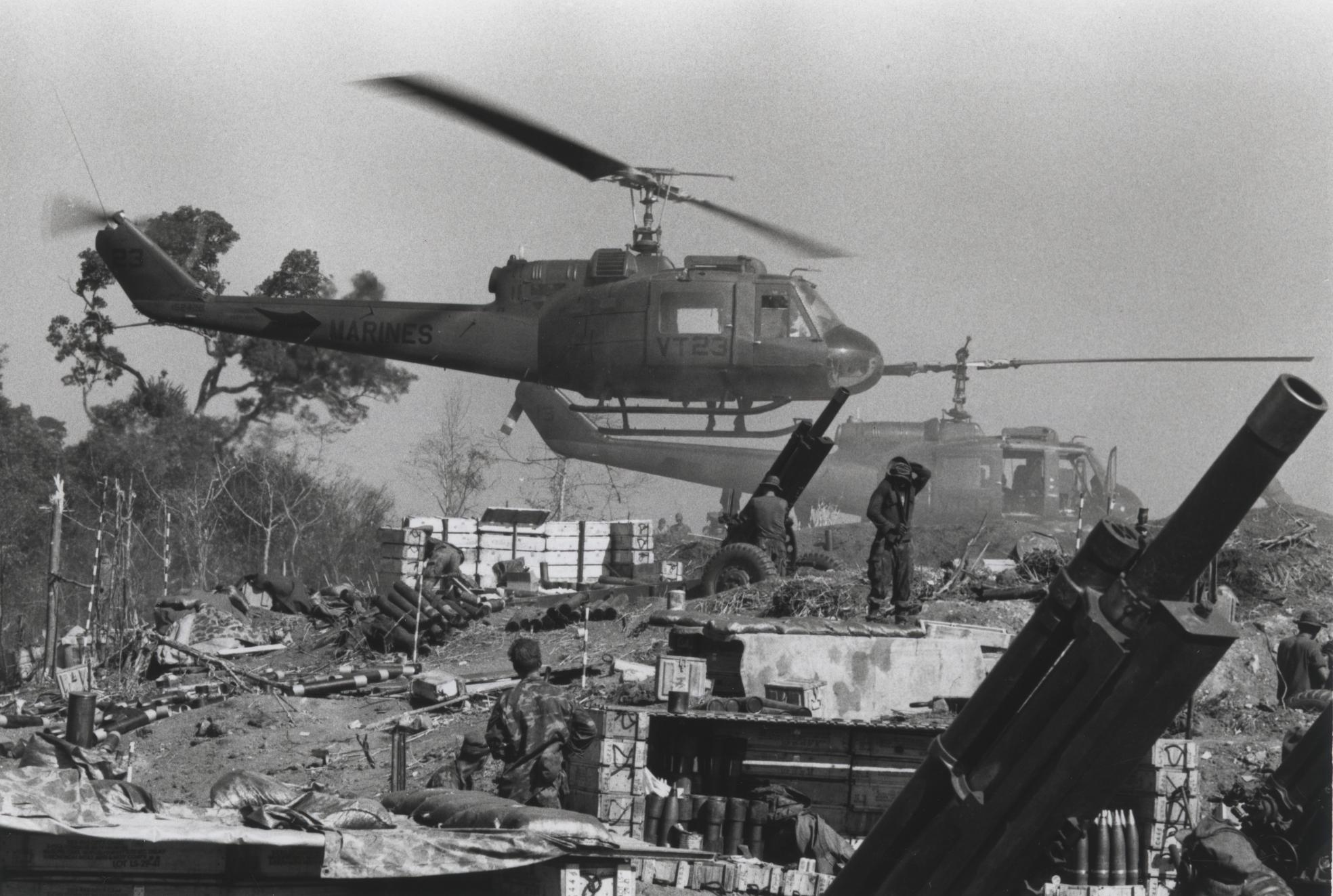
"Anywhere...Anytime": Marine UH-1E (Huey) helicopters touch down with their loads at Fire Support Base Cunningham, 1969.

This is a list of air cargo, airmail and airlift related events as well as a summary from the decade 1960-1969:

== Summary for the decade ==
(Based on the content of this page where unreferenced:)

=== Civil developments ===
The most important civil developments of this decade are the transition to jet-powered cargo (e.g. DC-8F, 707F) and the accompanying step-change in payload (~30 tons class) and much faster long-haul cargo capability. Together with a further development of palletization / containerization (although not standardized in the industry as a whole) enabling faster turnaround and mechanised handling, this facilitated a strong growth of air cargo, although still in a secondary role behind passenger transport and a large part being transported in the bellies of passenger aircraft.

By this decade, established passenger airlines increasingly recognized air freight as a viable source of additional revenue. Many carriers organized dedicated cargo divisions and, in some cases, operated freight-only services in competition with specialist all-cargo operators. Because passenger airlines already possessed route networks, ground infrastructure, and operational systems, they were able to accommodate cargo traffic at comparatively lower marginal cost. Early narrow-body jets like the Boeing 707, Douglas DC-8 and Convair 880/990 offered significantly more usable lower-deck cargo volume than earlier piston/turboprop airliners, largely due to their pressurized, wide-fuselage designs (circular or double-bubble) allowing for substantial and better accessible baggage/freight holds (Unit Load Devices/ULDs) all in combination with more powerful engines, transforming air transport from primarily passenger-focused to include significant freight capacity, enabling bulk shipping alongside passengers. Passenger airlines further expanded their involvement in air freight by utilizing unused capacity in the lower holds of scheduled passenger aircraft, thereby integrating cargo transport into regular passenger services and creating an additional commercial channel for air freight, generally making it hard for the all-cargo airlines to compete. These advantages also contributed to sustained growth in airmail traffic, which rose from approximately 130 million tonne-kilometres in 1945 to 610 million in 1960, reaching 2.3 billion in 1968.

The end of the decade saw the first flight of the Boeing 747, marking the start of the wide-body era, as well as the founding of DHL, that would further expand the air express business in the next decade, together with Emery Air Freight, FedEx and UPS.

=== Military developments ===
The 1960s marked a major transition in military air cargo from piston-powered transport fleets to the jet age, greatly increasing the speed, range, and global reach of strategic airlift. During the decade, air logistics became an essential component of military planning, particularly for the United States as Cold War commitments expanded worldwide and the Vietnam War escalated.

One of the most significant developments was the introduction of the jet-powered Lockheed C-141 Starlifter. Conceived to replace slower aircraft such as the C-124 Globemaster II, the C-141 first flew in 1963 and entered operational service in 1965. It was the world's first jet aircraft designed specifically for large-scale military cargo transport and rapidly became the backbone of U.S. strategic airlift. Its ability to transport troops, vehicles, pallets, and medical evacuees over intercontinental distances dramatically reduced deployment times compared with earlier transport aircraft.

The Vietnam War became the defining test of military air cargo operations during the decade. Beginning in the mid-1960s, U.S. airlift forces moved vast quantities of personnel, ammunition, spare parts, vehicles, and medical supplies between North America, the Pacific, and Southeast Asia. The C-141 Starlifter was heavily employed on these routes, while tactical transport aircraft such as the C-130 Hercules sustained combat operations within the theater. Strategic airlift became a continuous logistical bridge linking the continental United States with forces deployed thousands of miles away.

Organizationally, the decade also saw the modernization of American military airlift command structures. In January 1966, the long-standing Military Air Transport Service (MATS) was replaced by the Military Airlift Command (MAC), reflecting the growing importance of global air mobility and the increasing scale of strategic transport operations. The new command integrated long-range cargo transport, aeromedical evacuation, and rapid deployment capabilities under a unified structure.

Another milestone was the development of the giant Lockheed C-5 Galaxy. Designed to carry outsized cargo that could not fit inside existing transports, the C-5 made its first flight in 1968. Although it entered operational service in the following decade, its development represented a major advance in military air cargo capability and reflected lessons learned from the Vietnam War regarding the movement of heavy equipment and large vehicles by air.

The decade also witnessed important advances in humanitarian and special-purpose airlift. Military transport aircraft supported Antarctic operations, disaster relief missions, and global Cold War deployments. In 1966, a C-141 became the first jet transport to fly directly from Christchurch, New Zealand, to McMurdo Station in Antarctica, demonstrating the expanding reach of jet-powered cargo aviation.

Another key development of the decade was the widespread adoption of standardized cargo handling systems, notably pallet-based logistics. These systems allowed for rapid loading and unloading, improved interoperability between aircraft and ground infrastructure, and more efficient integration of global supply chains. This standardisation formed the backbone of modern military airlift operations.

The 1960s also witnessed the emergence of the helicopter as a major military airlift platform. During the Vietnam War, helicopters were employed on an unprecedented scale to transport troops, ammunition, supplies, artillery, and casualties between dispersed bases and combat zones. Aircraft such as the UH-1 Iroquois ("Huey"), CH-47 Chinook, and CH-54 Tarhe demonstrated how rotary-wing aircraft could provide flexible battlefield logistics independent of runways. The decade established the concept of air mobility and made helicopters an indispensable component of modern tactical and operational airlift.

By the end of the 1960s, military air cargo had evolved into a highly sophisticated global logistics system capable of rapidly moving troops, equipment, and supplies across continents. The introduction of dedicated jet transports, the experience gained during Vietnam, and the development of very-large cargo aircraft such as the C-5 Galaxy established the foundations of modern strategic airlift for the decades that followed.

== Events ==
=== 1960s ===
- Undated – (United States) American Airlines developed the "Astroloader" for the Boeing 707, generally recognized as the world's first powered cargo loader designed for aircraft freight handling.
- Undated – (United States) American Airlines introduced the "Astroroller", an early in-aircraft roller system designed to facilitate the internal movement of cargo. The Astroroller is credited with being the world's first in-plane roller mechanisms developed for aircraft cargo handling.

=== 1960 ===
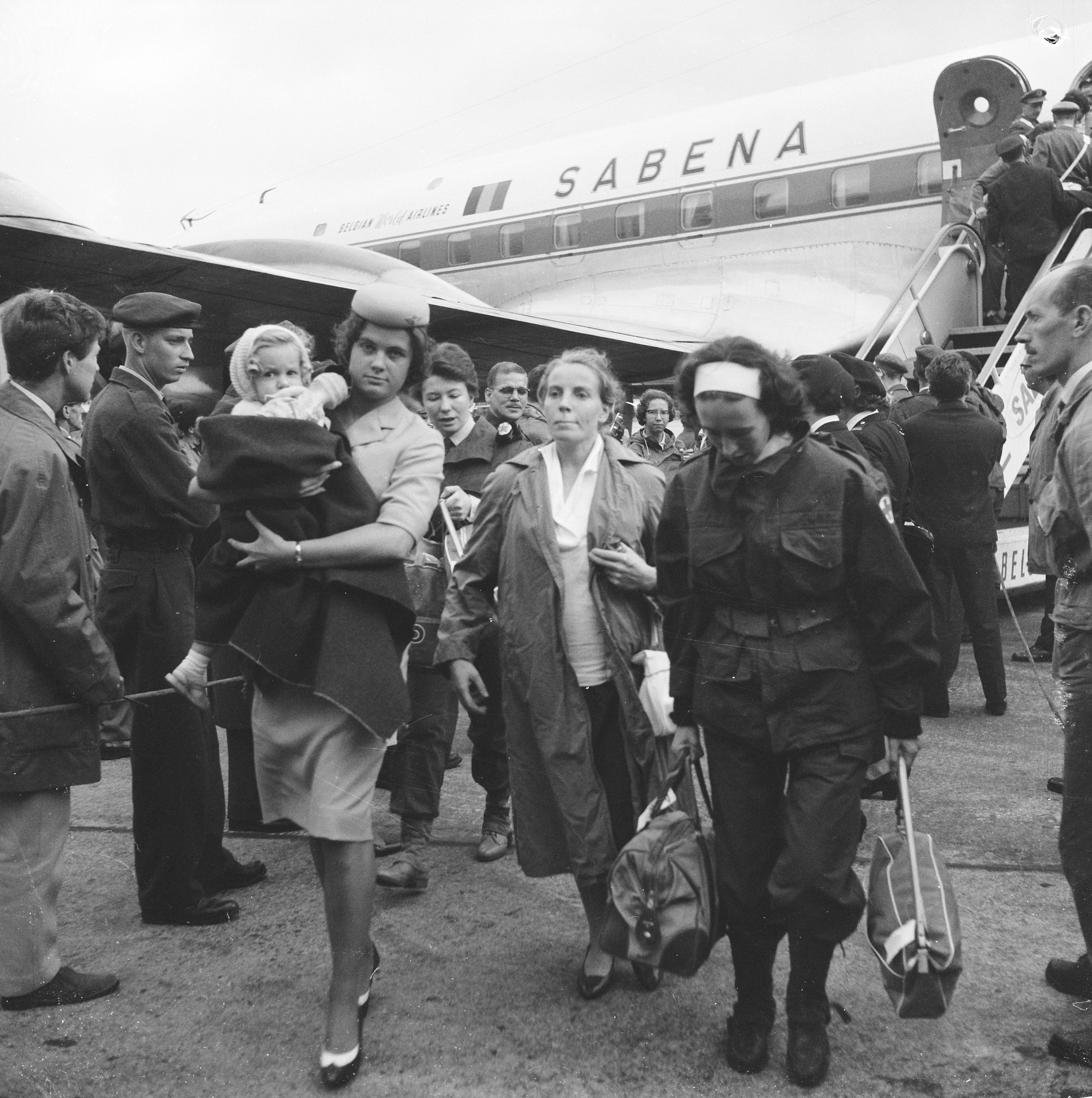
Arrival of refugees from Congo in Brussels, airlifted by Sabena, July 10, 1960.

- Undated – (United States) The U.S. Civil Aeronautics Board (CAB) in communication with the U.S. Air Force (USAF) revised military charter procurement practices: rather than the USAF operating all military transport, it incentivized commercial airline participation in the Civil Reserve Air Fleet, and consequently also in for example Logair, rewarding carriers that provided jets and convertible aircraft capable of cargo services.
- February 7 – (United States) A United States Air Force C-124 Globemaster II of the MATS 1607th Air Transport Wing completed a record-setting non-stop airlift flight from Hickam AFB (Hawaii) to Dover AFB (Delaware) in 18 hours 40 minutes.
- May 12 – (United States) A U.S. Air Force C-130 Hercules drops a record one-bundle 35,000 lb (15,876 kg) of equipment by parachute at El Centro, claimed as a world weight record for airdrops.
- July 9-29 – (Belgium-Congo) Shortly after the independence of Congo, Sabena begins airlifting Belgian and other European nationals out of Congo, assisted by several European airlines and the US military. Sabena used Douglas DC-6, Douglas DC-7 and Boeing 707 aircraft to fly between Léopoldville or Usumbura and Zaventem. Special challenge was for the Sabena Douglas DC-3 crews to retrieve people from the bush in eastern Congo while the airfields there were blocked by rebel soldiers. Over three weeks, 34,483 refugees were evacuated, 25,711 of them by Sabena.
- August 18 – (United States) A Fairchild C-119 Flying Boxcar successfully retrieved a capsule from the Corona reconnaissance satellite Discoverer 14 in mid-air — a first in aerospace history.

=== 1961 ===
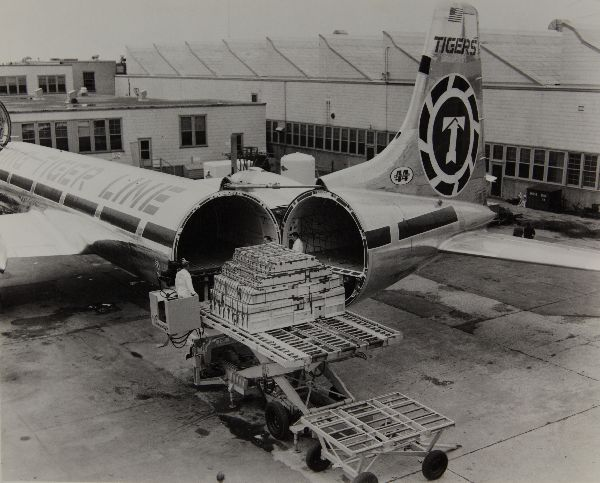
Flying Tiger Line Canadair Cl-44D showing swing-tail in action (undated)

- Undated – (United Kingdom) British European Airways (BEA) placed an order for three Armstrong Whitworth Argosy all-cargo aircraft, the airline's first dedicated freighters; the first one was delivered and entered service later that year.
- Undated – (United States) Flying Tiger Line put its first Canadair CL-44 “Swingtail” freighter into service.
- February – (India) India issued stamps commemorating the 50th anniversary of the world's first official airmail flight (18-Feb-1911).
- November – (United Kingdom) The General Post Office began a direct airmail service, flying between London and the cities Glasgow, Edinburgh and Belfast.
- December 23 – (United States / Vietnam) In Operation Chopper, U.S. Army helicopters airlift 1,000 South Vietnamese paratroopers to attack a suspected Viet Cong headquarters in South Vietnam 10 miles (16 km) west of Saigon.

=== 1962 ===
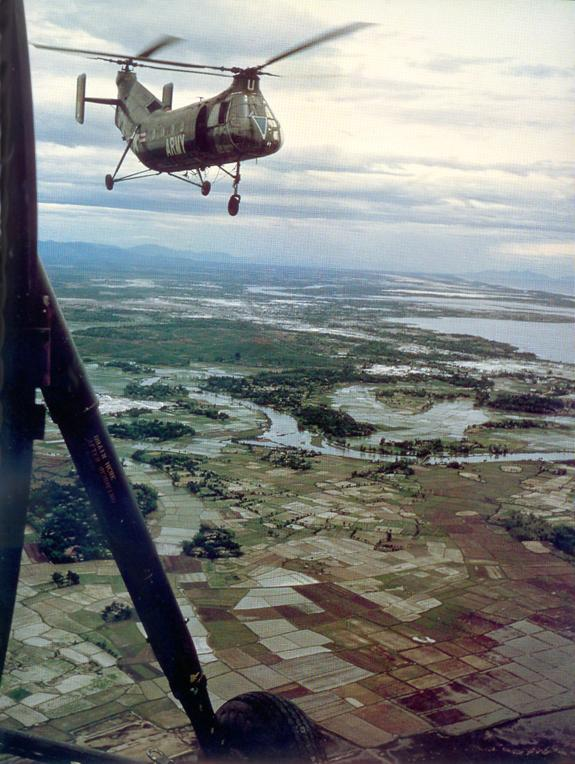
U.S. Army Piasecki H-21C Shawnee transport helicopters over rice paddies in Vietnam, 1963.

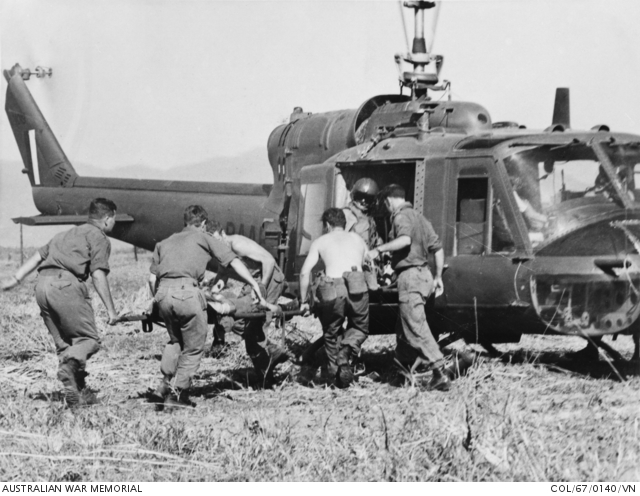
U.S. Army Bell UH-1 Iroquois "Huey" of the No. 9 Squadron evacuates booby trap casualties from An Nhut during Operation Beaumaris, Feb.14, 1967.

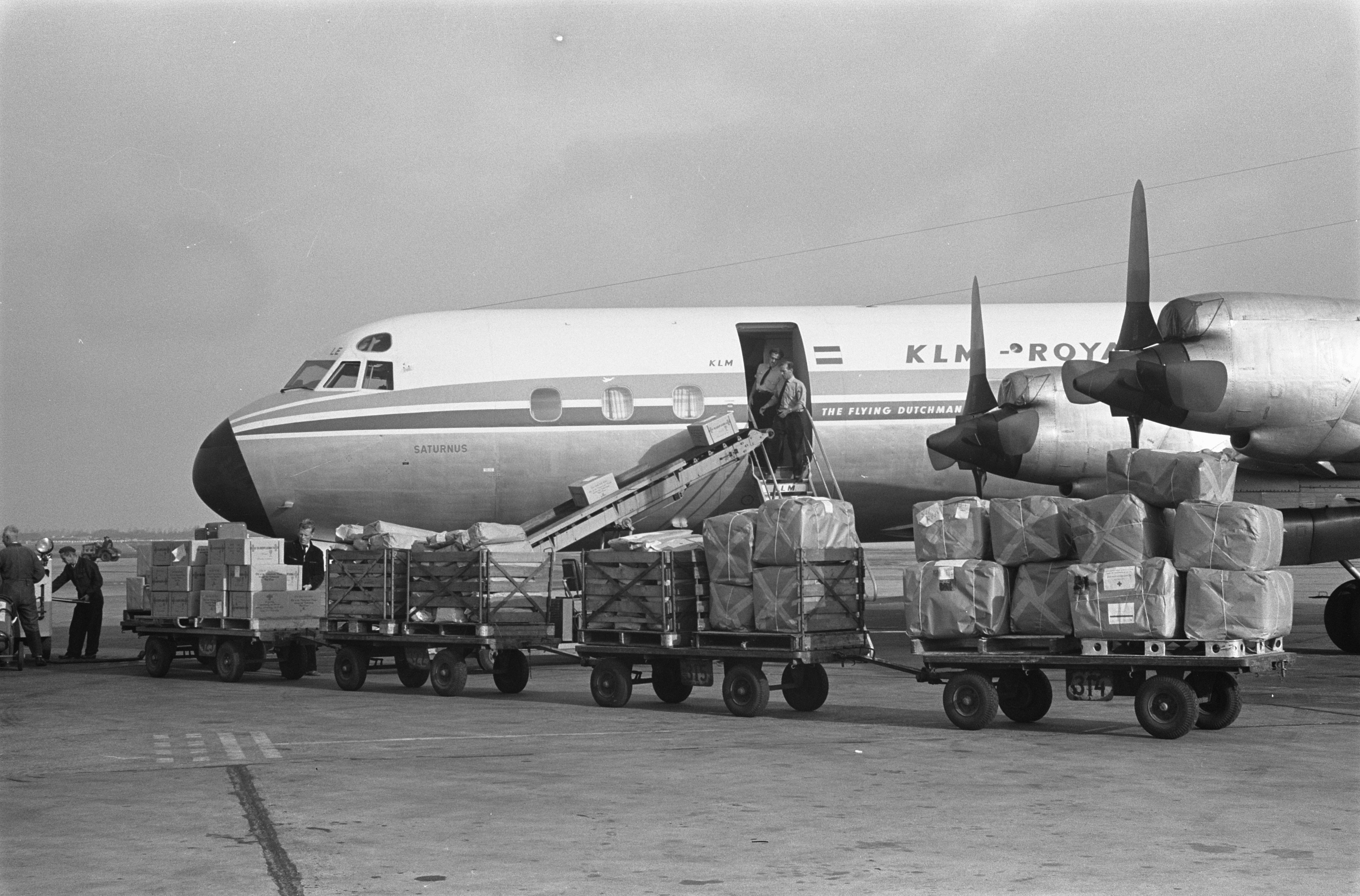
First KLM aircraft with medical supplies for Persia leaves Schiphol airport, September 4, 1962.

- Undated – (United States) Pan American World Airways placed a landmark order for Boeing 707-321C aircraft configured for freight operations, becoming the first U.S. airline to commit to jet-powered freighters, also as part of the Civil Reserve Air Fleet. The aircraft were designed with enhanced payload capacity and range relative to earlier piston and turboprop freighters, enabling Pan Am to offer faster, longer-range all-cargo services once they entered service in following years.
- Undated – (United States) The Port Authority of New York and New Jersey announced plans to significantly expand cargo handling facilities at Idlewild Airport (now John F. Kennedy International Airport), increasing available space to approximately 590,000 square feet in response to rapidly growing demand for air freight services.
- Undated – (United States) The United States Navy developed and trialed vertical replenishment (VERTREP) operations to transfer supplies between ships at sea using helicopters. As part of these early efforts, Sikorsky HSS-2 Sea King helicopters (later redesignated SH-3A under the 1962 Tri-Service aircraft designation system) embarked aboard the general stores issue ship USS Altair (AK-257) and the fleet oiler USS Mississinewa (AO-144) to resupply vessels of the United States Sixth Fleet operating in the Mediterranean.
- January – (United States / Vietnam) United States Army Piasecki H-21C Shawnee transport helicopters were deployed to Da Nang Air Base in South Vietnam, marking the first time American aircraft operated from that base.
- April – (United States / Vietnam) Bell UH-1 Iroquois "Huey" utility helicopters are deployed in South Vietnam for the first time in the Vietnam War, in the role of helicopter ambulances for aeromedical evacuation (MEDEVAC) operations with the 57th Medical Detachment of the United States Army at Nha Trang Air Base. The type would later become closely associated with U.S. Army rotary-wing / air assault operations throughout the conflict. Over 7,000 Hueys were deployed in various roles, with a loss rate of just under 50 percent.
- June 18 – (United States / Vietnam) United States Marine Corps helicopter units operating in South Vietnam introduced a new air assault tactic designed to prevent Viet Cong fighters from evading engagements with larger South Vietnamese ground forces. Under this procedure, groups of Marine transport helicopters carrying Army of the Republic of Vietnam (ARVN) troops maintained aerial patrols above contested zones and, when enemy forces were sighted withdrawing, inserted ARVN troops into positions intended to block their escape. By mid-July, Eagle Flight had been demonstrated as an effective tactical technique during Operation Shufly.
- September 4 – (Netherlands - Persia) KLM transports medical supplies in aid of a large earthquake near Teheran, Persia.
- September 12 – (United States) The Senate considered S. 2815, a bill to amend the Aircraft Loan Guarantees Act originally enacted on 7 September 1957. The statute authorized the federal government to guarantee private loans made to eligible air carriers for the purchase of aircraft, primarily to help smaller and local (all-cargo) airlines obtain financing on more favorable terms than they could secure independently. As ultimately enacted later in 1962 with changes were intended to maintain and modernize the aircraft loan guarantee program, ensuring continued support for airline financing while broadening the program's applicability to additional types of operators and (jet) aircraft types (Public Law 87-820, An Act to amend the Act of September 7, 1957, relating to aircraft loan guarantees):
  - The authorization for aircraft loan guarantees was extended by five years, allowing the program to continue through September 7, 1967.
  - The maximum loan amount that could be guaranteed for any one carrier was increased from $5 million to $10 million, reflecting updated financing needs and economic conditions.
  - Administrative responsibility for the program was transferred from the Civil Aeronautics Board to the Department of Commerce, consolidating oversight within the executive branch.
  - The statute was also amended to clarify that the Secretary of Commerce would consult with the CAB when making guarantees under the Act.
- September 18 – (United States / Vietnam) Units of the United States Marine Corps flying Sikorsky UH-34 helicopters engaged in their first combat operations, from Da Nang Air Base in South Vietnam. Operating as part of Operation Shufly, Marine helicopter crews transported elements of the Army of the Republic of Vietnam (ARVN) 2nd Division into positions in the hills south of Da Nang.
- December 8 – (United Kingdom / Borneo) Pro-Indonesian insurgents of the North Kalimantan National Army launched a revolt against the Sultanate of Brunei, then a British protectorate on the island of Borneo. In response to the outbreak of violence, British forces were rapidly airlifted from Singapore to the region in order to suppress the uprising and restore order. Within hours of the rebellion's commencement, elements of the British Army and other Commonwealth units were flown into strategic locations in Brunei and neighbouring Sarawak, helping to defeat the insurrection and secure key government and infrastructure sites.

=== 1963 ===
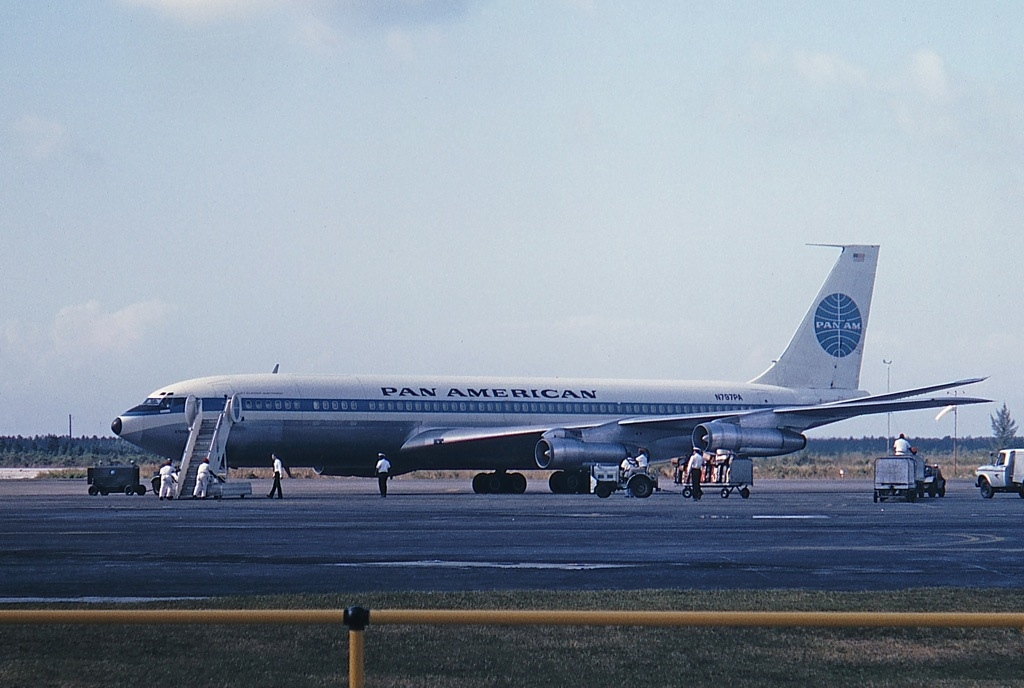
Pan Am Boeing 707-321C N797PA at Nassau Int'l Airport (MYNN), Bahamas, February 18, 1965 (Jon Proctor).

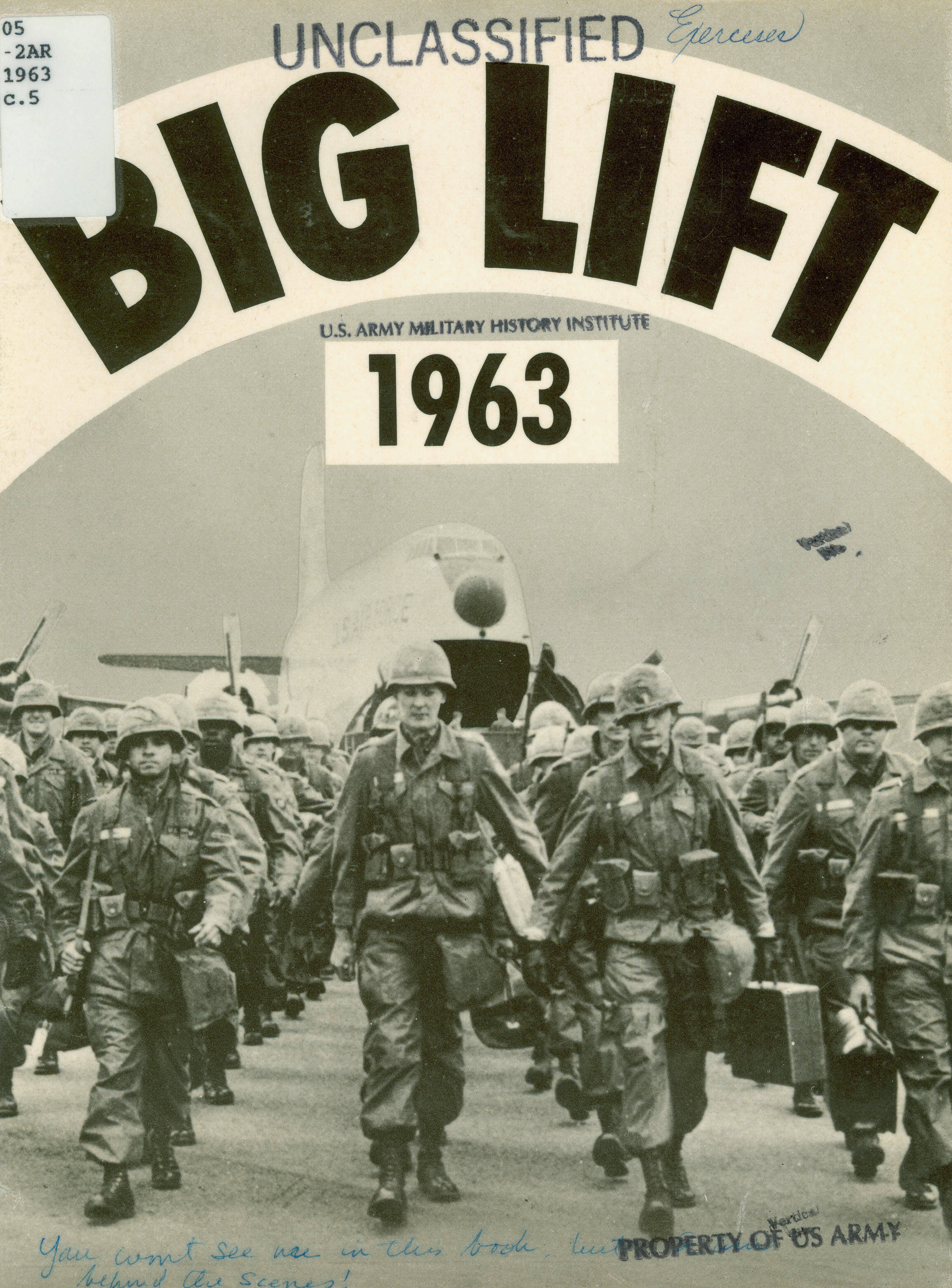
Cover of an illustrated brochure published by the U.S. Army in Europe (USAREUR) reporting on the NATO support Exercise "Big Lift", an event testing the ability to provide global massive reinforcement by 'Air Armies', 1963.

- Undated – (United States) In a white paper, Flying Tiger Line, Riddle Airlines, and Slick Airways argued that competitive practices by the four dominant U.S. passenger airlines American Airlines, Eastern Airlines, TWA and United Airlines, were undermining the economic sustainability of independent all-cargo carriers.
- January 2 – (United States / Vietnam) In the Battle of Ap Bac in South Vietnam, Viet Cong ground fire shoots down a United States Army UH-1 attack helicopter and four U.S. Army CH-21 transport helicopters as they arrive at their landing zone. Republic of Vietnam Air Force C-123 Provider transport planes drop about 300 South Vietnamese paratroopers later that day.
- February – (United States - Cuba) Commercial airline flights between the United States and Cuba are "temporarily" suspended. They will not resume until August 31, 2016.
- April 27 - May 20 – (United States / Vietnam) U.S. Marine Corps transport helicopters airlift South Vietnamese troops during "Operation Bach Phuong XI", a South Vietnamese offensive against Viet Cong forces near Do Xa, South Vietnam.
- May – (United States) Northwest Airlines introduced the Boeing 707-320B type with a modification existing of a large cargo door and a capacity of 5 tonnes of cargo along the left side of the forward cabin.
- May – (United States) Pan Am Cargo's all-cargo jet service began with the introduction of the Boeing 707-321C type that would soon dominate Pan Am's freight operations, using nine of these aircraft, each capable of carrying 38 tonnes of cargo.
- July 13 – (United States) The Post Office Department announced plans to “gradually expand” its use of airlift for first-class mail, reflecting a shift toward broader application of air transportation to meet public expectations for delivery speed, as articulated by Postmaster General J. Edward Day in mid-year testimony before the Air Transport Association.
- October 22 – (United States - Europe) In a NATO support exercise named "Operation Big Lift", the United States Air Force airlifts 15,000 troops and around 500 tons of equipment to Europe making over 200 flights within a timeframe of 64 hours – the largest movement of troops by air to that date. After operational exercises in Europe, the return flights were done between November 12 and December 4.
- December 15 – (Jordan) Alia begins flight operations, using a fleet of two Handley Page Dart Heralds and a Douglas DC-7, offering service between Amman, Jordan, and Kuwait City, Kuwait, Beirut, Lebanon, and Cairo, Egypt.

=== 1964 ===
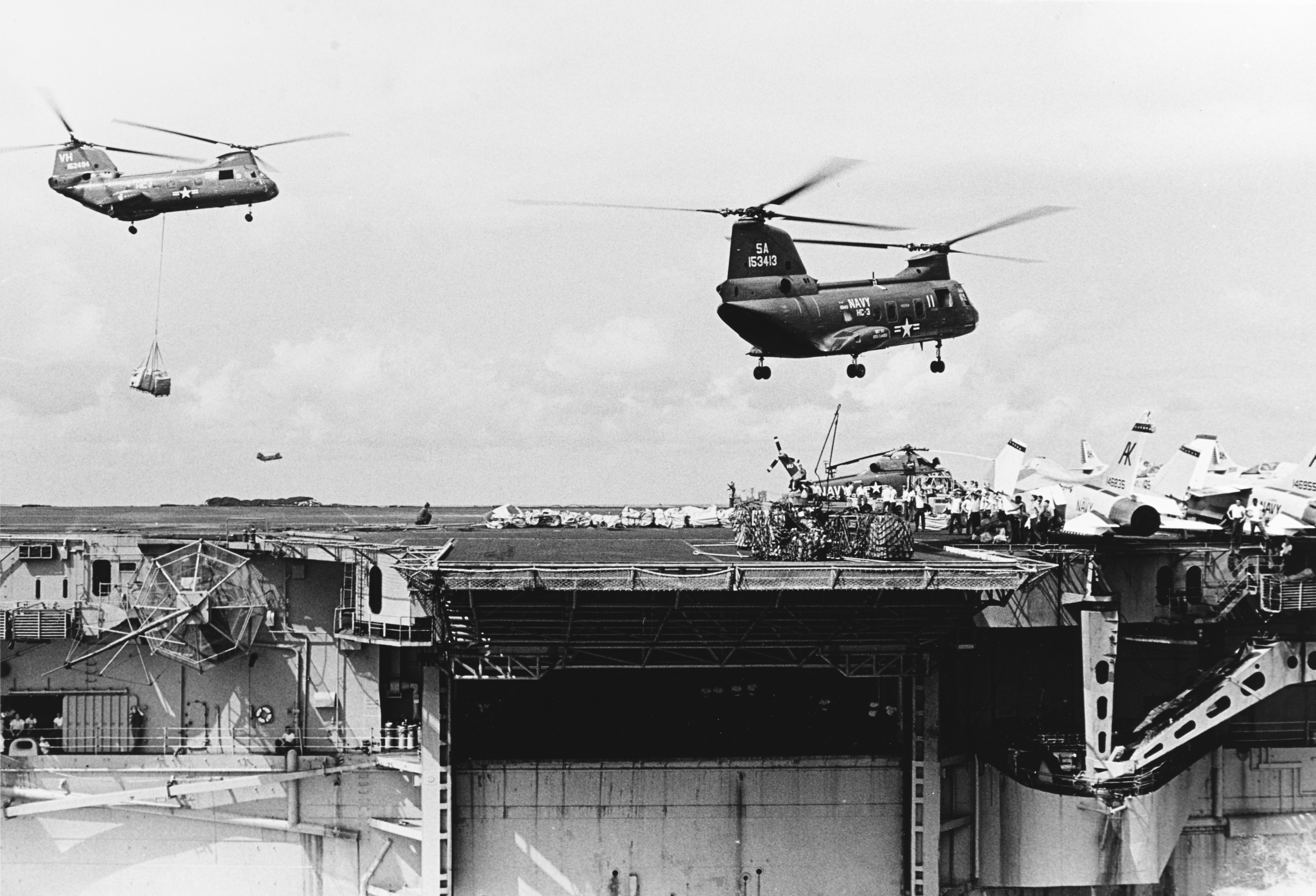
Two Boeing-Vertol UH-46D Sea Knight helicopters bring supplies to the U.S. Navy aircraft carrier USS Intrepid (CVS-11) in the South China Sea, December 1968. The helicopter to the right (BuNo 153413) was attached to Helicopter Support Squadron 3 (HC-3) "Packrats" from the fast combat support ship USS Camden (AOE-2). The helicopter to the left (BuNo 152494) was attached to HC-7 "Seadevils" from the combat stores ship USS Mars (AFS-1). December 1968.

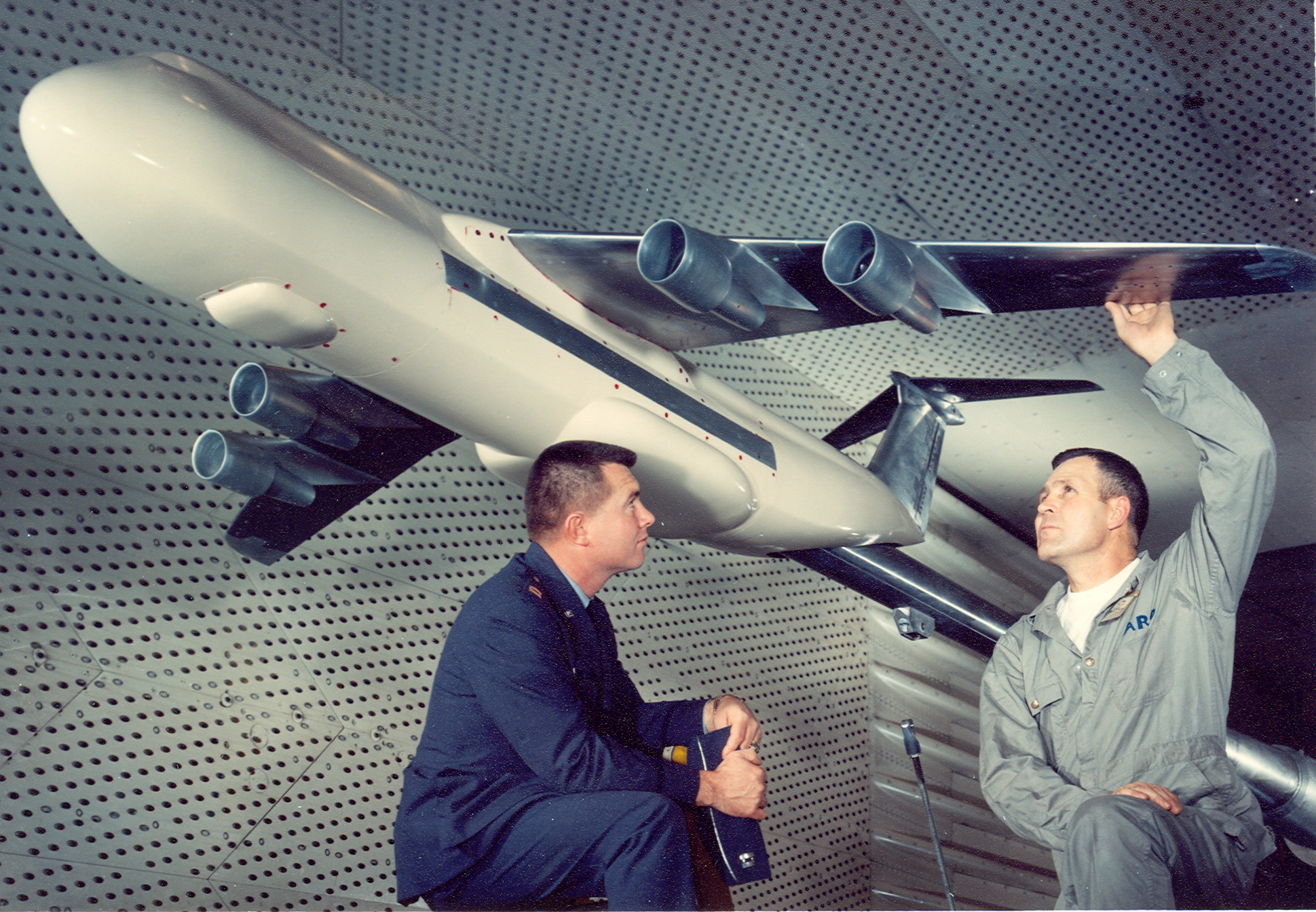
One of the first C-5A models for the USAF Heavy Logistics System (CX-HLS) program is given a final inspection before testing in the Arnold Engineering Development Complex 16-foot transonic wind tunnel at Arnold Air Force Base in the mid-1960s.

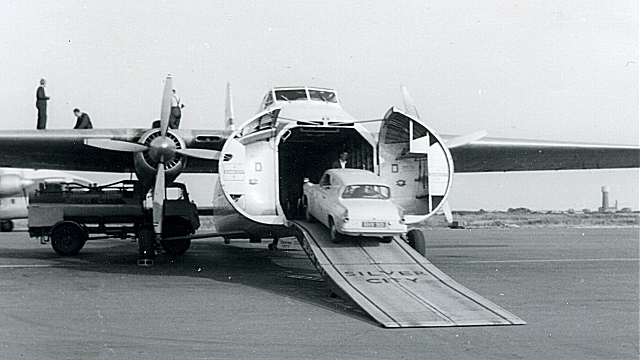
Loading a Ford Anglia on Silver City Airways Bristol Superfreighter 'City of Durham', August 1960.

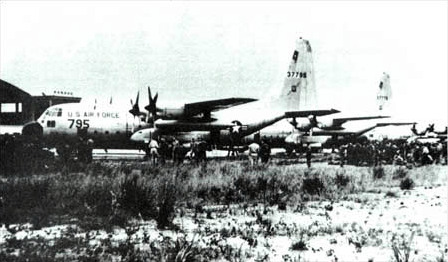
Operation Dragon Rouge, Congo - U.S. aircrews and Paracommandos at Kamina airfield prior to Stanleyville flight, 1964.

- Undated – (United States) The Air Transport Association of America reports that around 1964 several major airlines were investing substantially in new jet-age mechanized cargo handling systems (40 million dollars) and cargo terminal infrastructure (over $125 million).
- Undated – (United States) In 1964, REA Express initiated an effort aimed at introducing computerized systems to improve the tracking and transmission of data for small-shipment traffic. As part of this program, the company undertook the development of a nationwide information network to support express operations. Progress on this initiative was later referenced in the Congressional Record during a 1966 United States Senate debate, which noted that REA Express had committed approximately $91 million toward operational upgrades. These investments included the construction of 126 new terminals, the installation of 10 automated sorting systems, and the implementation of a nationwide data transmission system intended to enhance shipment processing and tracking efficiency.
- February 15 – (United States / Vietnam) The North Vietnamese Air Force scores its first aerial victory against an American aircraft when a North Vietnamese T-28 Trojan armed trainer shoots down a C-123 Provider transport plane.
- February 19 – (France / Gabon) French troops are airlifted to Gabon to put down a coup by the army.
- February 28 – (United States) A U.S. Navy helicopter of Utility Helicopter Squadron 1 (HU-1) successfully lands on the deck of the combat stores ship USS Mars (AFS-1). Although the use of helicopters for vertical replenishment (VERTREP) at sea had been examined and experimentally demonstrated since 1959, and several auxiliary vessels had already been fitted with helicopter landing platforms, the commissioning of Mars marked the first practical integration of rotary-wing aircraft into the U.S. Navy's fleet logistics support system.
- March – (United States) United Airlines became the first U.S. airline to offer nonstop transcontinental all-cargo service.
- March 28 - April 17 – (United States) The U.S. Air Force executes "Operation Helping Hand", an airlift that has brought 1,850 short tons (1,678 metric tons) of relief equipment and supplies to Anchorage, Alaska, in the aftermath of a massive earthquake there. The cargo aircraft used included C-124s, C-123s, C-130s, and C-97s.
- April – (United States) The U.S. Air Force issued a formal request for proposals for the Heavy Logistics System (CX-HLS) program, previously known as CX-HLC (Heavy Logistics Capability). The solicitation sought designs for a new long-range strategic transport aircraft capable of carrying outsized cargo. By May 1964, airframe proposals had been submitted by Boeing, Douglas, General Dynamics, Lockheed, and Martin Marietta, while General Electric, Curtiss-Wright, and Pratt & Whitney provided competing engine proposals. Following an initial evaluation phase, the Air Force selected Boeing, Douglas, and Lockheed to receive one-year study contracts to further refine their aircraft concepts. Parallel engine development studies were awarded to General Electric and Pratt & Whitney. Although differing in configuration, the three competing aircraft designs shared several core characteristics. Each featured a flight deck positioned above the main cargo compartment to permit loading through a forward nose door. Boeing and Douglas adopted a raised cockpit housed in a dorsal pod atop the fuselage, whereas Lockheed employed a continuous cockpit profile extending along the fuselage, resulting in a distinctive oval cross-section. All proposals incorporated swept wings and were equipped with both forward and aft cargo doors, enabling simultaneous loading and unloading operations. Lockheed was selected as the winner and awarded a contract in 1965; the aircraft was later to become the C-5A Galaxy, which would significantly transform strategic airlift capacity beginning in the early 1970s. Also the competition led indirectly to the development of two early civil wide body aircraft of the seventies, the Boeing 747 and Douglas DC-10.
- June 6 – (United Kingdom - Europe) Silver City Airways announces that it has airlifted its one millionth car between England and continental Europe.
- July 6 – (United States / Vietnam) U.S. Marine Corps UH-34D transport helicopters airlift a 93-man relief force during the Battle of Nam Dong in South Vietnam.
- November 18 – (United States / Vietnam) The U.S. Military Assistance Command, Vietnam, provides 105 United States Army helicopters to assist in transporting 7,000 South Vietnamese Army troops to attack a concentration of Viet Cong guerrillas believed to occupy a forest in South Vietnam 40 miles (64 km) northwest of Saigon near Thủ Dầu Một in the largest attack thus far of the Vietnam War. The South Vietnamese troops find no Viet Cong in the area and assess that they had withdrawn at least three days earlier.
- November 19 – (United States / Vietnam) Seventeen U.S. helicopters transport 54 South Vietnamese troops to attack Viet Cong guerrillas in South Vietnam's Quảng Nam Province. The South Vietnamese reportedly kill 17 Viet Cong and capture 21.
- November 24 – (Belgium, United States / Congo) Belgian paratroops are dropped into Congo from United States Air Force C-130s as part of peace-time operation "Dragon Rouge". The UN peacekeeping force remained in the Congo for three years, supported by American C-130 and C-124 cargo planes.

=== 1965 ===
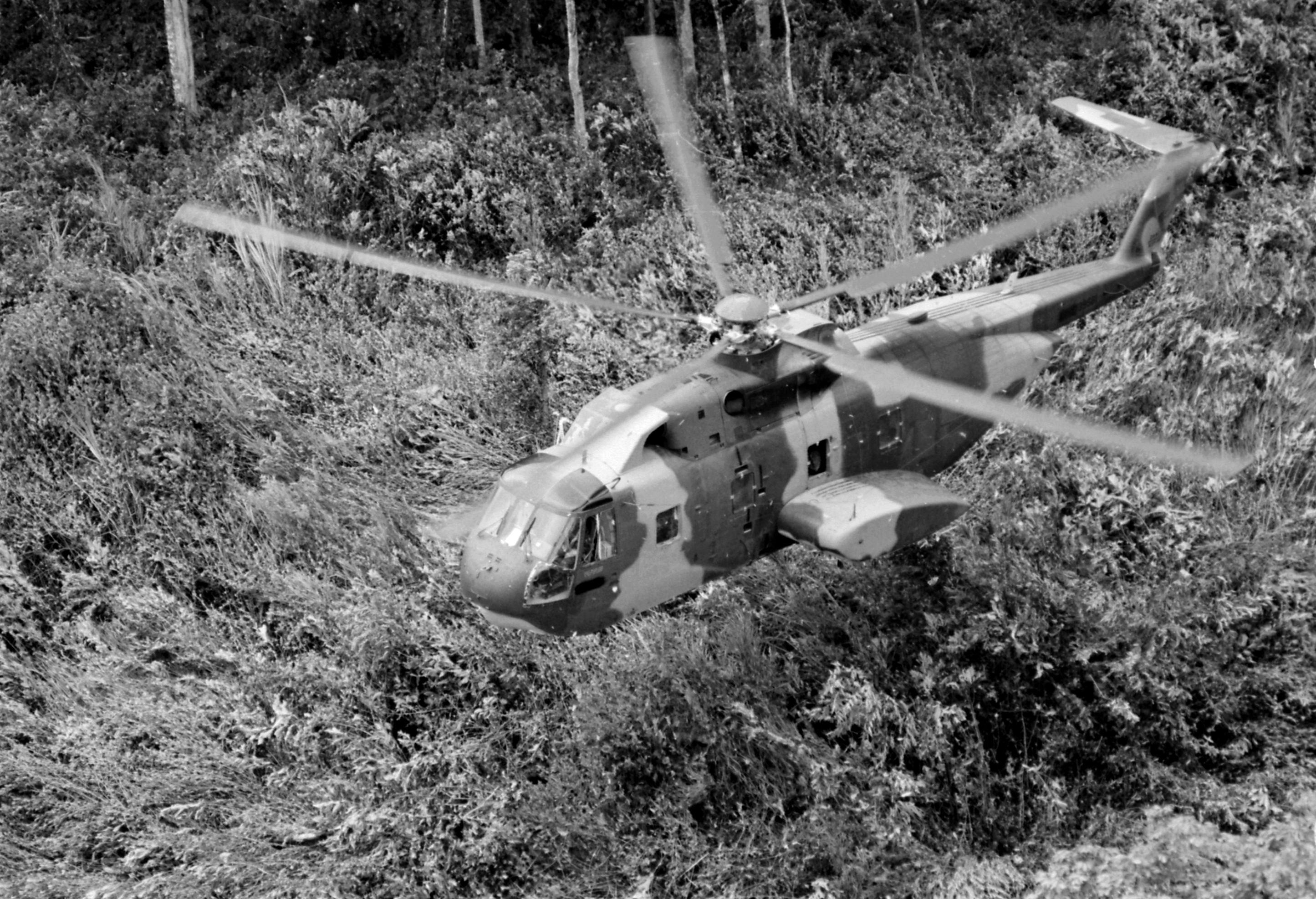
A U.S. Air Force Sikorsky CH-3E Jolly Green Giant (s/n 63-9681) of the 20th Helicopter Squadron approaching a landing zone in Southeast Asian jungle during "Operation Pony Express" in June 1968. The operation included covert transportation of, and the provision of aerial support for, indigenous soldiers and material operating across the Laotian and North Vietnamese borders during the Vietnam War. Note that the helicopter is unmarked and that the "USAF" in front of the serial number on the tail has been overpainted.

- Undated – (United States) Yale undergraduate Frederick W. Smith authored the paper that laid the conceptual foundation for what a few years later in 1971 would become FedEx, pioneering the idea of a system optimized for time-sensitive freight like computer parts, electronics and medicine.
- Undated – (United States) Pan Am Cargo's round-the-world jet freighter service is introduced.
- Undated – (United States) While operating in the Mediterranean with the United States Navy Sixth Fleet, the general stores issue ship USS Altair (AKS-32) conducted what is believed to have been the world's first nighttime vertical replenishment (VERTREP) of an aircraft carrier, employing a Sikorsky SH-3A Sea King antisubmarine helicopter.
- May 18 – (United States / Vietnam) Members of the United States Naval Reserve initiated a voluntary airlift effort in support of operations in Vietnam. Flying C-54 and C-118 transport aircraft, reserve aircrews conducted weekend missions transporting essential personnel and time-critical cargo into the theater of operations, accumulating more than 19,000 flight hours during the first 18 months of the program.
- June 27 – (United States / Vietnam) The 173rd Airborne Brigade took part in what was, at the time, the largest helicopter-supported troop movement undertaken in the Vietnam War. The operation involved more than 140 U.S. Army aircraft, including over 70 troop-carrying helicopters, which airlifted two battalions of the Army of the Republic of Vietnam's 2nd Airborne Brigade along with the 1st and 2nd Battalions of the U.S. 503rd Infantry Regiment into War Zone D.
- October 8 – (United States / Vietnam) The United States Air Force deployed the 20th Helicopter Squadron to South Vietnam, marking the first overseas deployment of a USAF cargo helicopter unit. Equipped with Sikorsky CH-3C Sea King helicopters, the squadron provided airlift support for Air Force special operations, including the covert "Pony Express" missions conducted primarily in Laos.

=== 1966 ===
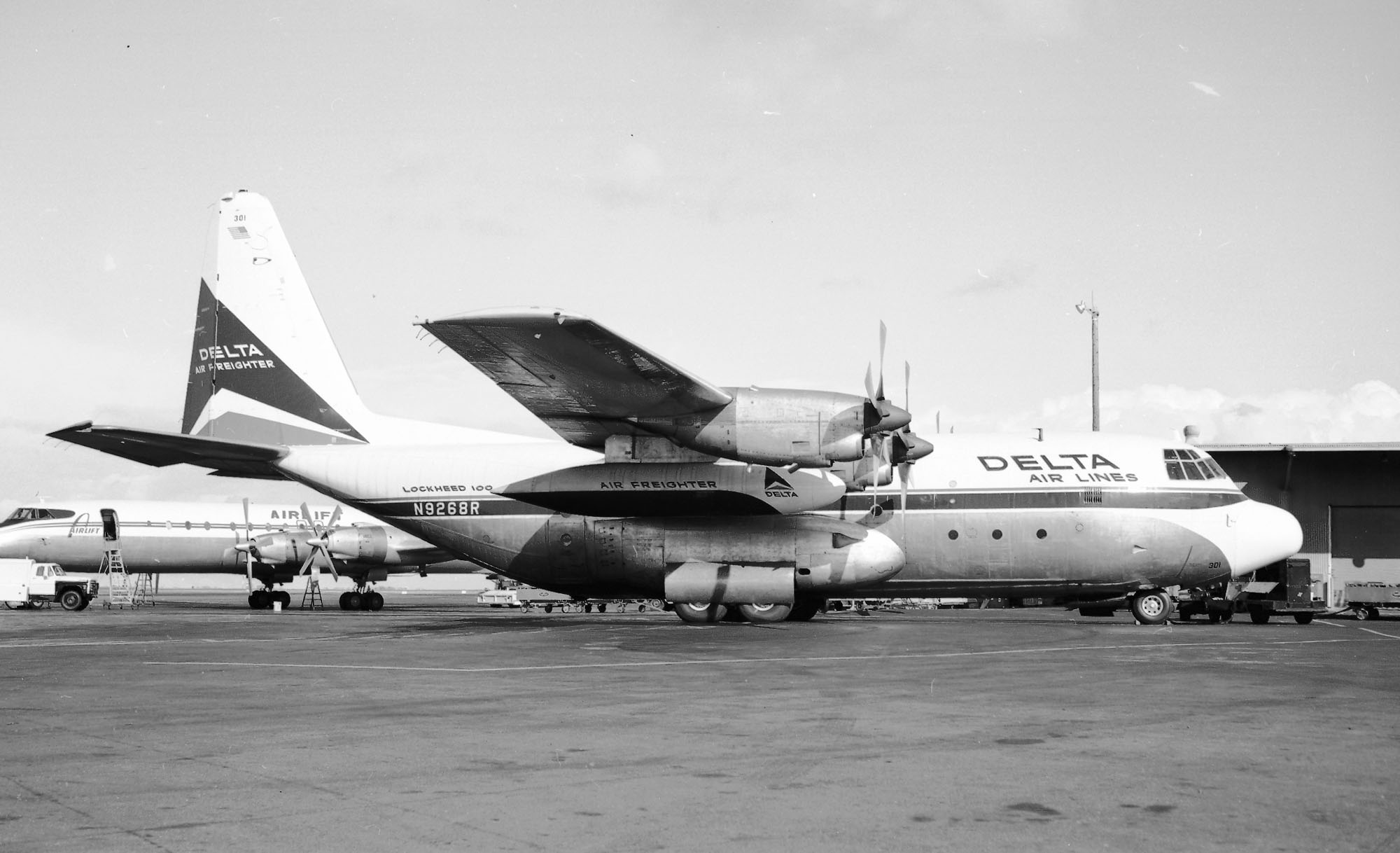
Delta Airlines Lockheed L-100 N9268R, August 1968.

- Undated – (Canada) Air Canada removed seats from one of its Vickers Vanguard airliners and converted it for pure cargo use, known informally as the “Cargoliner”.
- Undated – (United States) A Delta Air Lines Lockheed L-100 cargo plane transports NASA’s Surveyor 3 spacecraft from Los Angeles to the launching site at Cape Kennedy, Florida. This marks the first time a spacecraft was carried by regular commercial aircraft.
- January 22 – (United States - South Vietnam) The U.S. Air Force completes the largest airlift of troops and equipment into a combat zone to date,. Since "Operation Blue Light" began on December 27, 1965, the Air Force has flown 4,600 short tons (4,173 metric tons) of equipment and over 3,000 troops from Hickam Air Force Base, Hawaii, to Pleiku, South Vietnam.
- 13 April – (United States) Pan Am ordered 25 Boeing 747-100 aircraft worth US$525 million, the world's first order for wide-body airliners.
- May 16 - July 1 – (United Kingdom) During the 1966 UK dock strikes (or Seamen's strikes) many freight charters were flown by the UK cargo charter airlines like ACE Freighters.
- November 14 – (United States - Antarctica) A U.S. Air Force 86th Military Airlift Squadron C-141 Starlifter piloted by Captain Howard Geddes became the first jet aircraft to land in Antarctica, when it touched down on the ice at McMurdo Sound after a 2,200-mile (3,543-km) flight from Christchurch, New Zealand.

=== 1967 ===
- April 19 – (United States) A Martin X-23 PRIME (Precision Reentry Including Maneuvering reEntry) experimental lifting body re-entry vehicle was recovered in midair by a specially-equipped Lockheed JC-130B Hercules aircraft over the Pacific Ocean.
- March 6 – (United States) Flying Tiger Line received its first Douglas DC-8-63F freighter (a stretched long-range jet freighter).
- June 18 – (United States - Antarctica) The first regularly scheduled winter flight to Antarctica took place, when the U.S. Navy C-130L Hercules City of Christchurch, with the commander of U.S. Naval Support Force Antarctica, U.S. Navy Rear Admiral James Lloyd Abbot, Jr., in the cockpit alongside its pilot, flew from Christchurch, New Zealand, to McMurdo Station carrying 22 people (including two parties of scientists riding as passengers), 5,000 pounds (2,268 kg) of mail, and almost 3,000 pounds (1,361 kg) of fresh food. Previous winter flights to Antarctica had all been for the emergency evacuation of medical patients only. The aircraft returned to Christchurch the following day.

=== 1968 ===
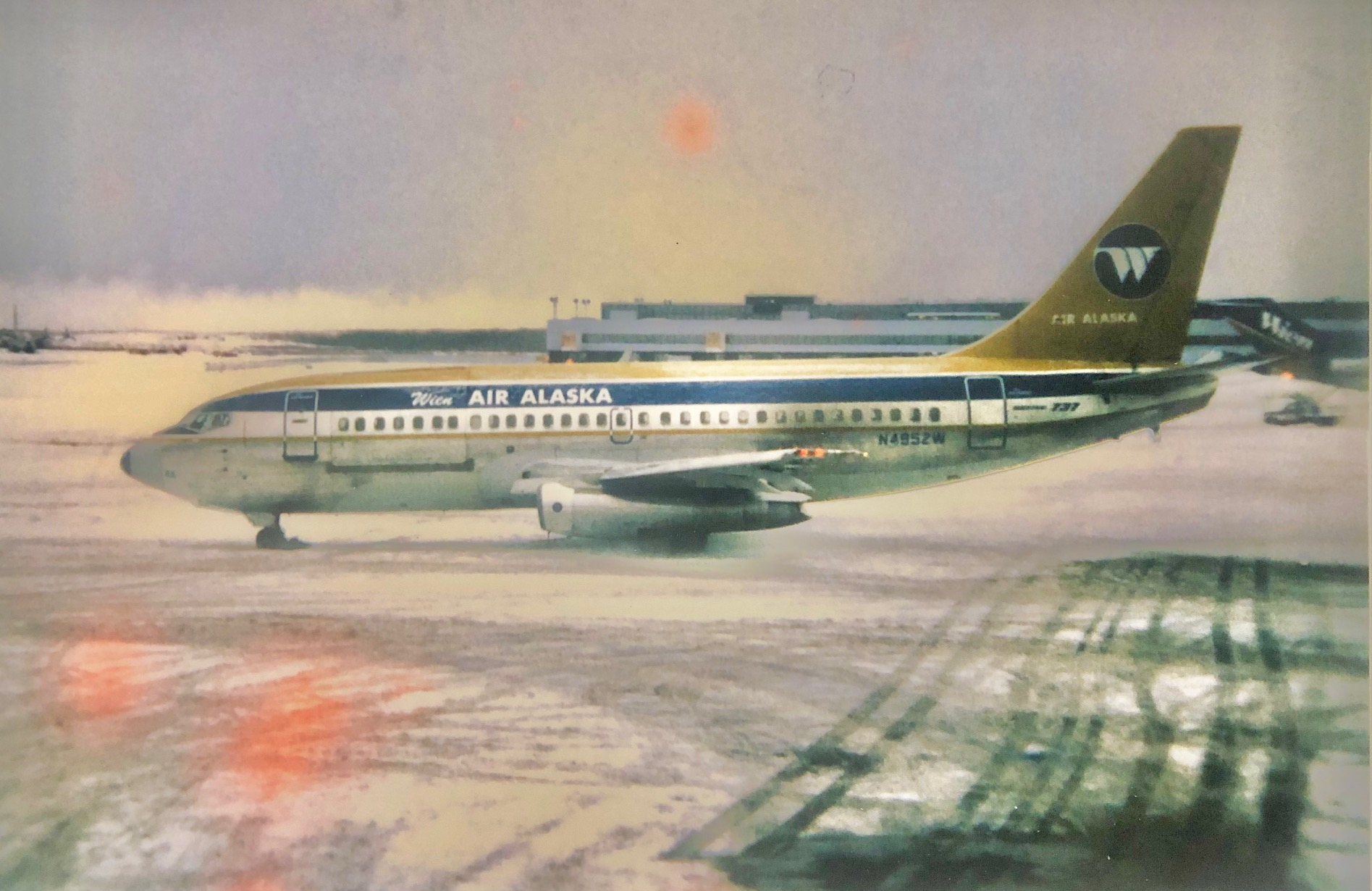
Wien Air Alaska N4952W 737-200 1973-81 Livery

- December 6 – (United States) Wien Air Alaska received the first Boeing 737 certified by Boeing with the gravel kit which enabled operations into remote airfields in Alaska with unpaved runways.
- December 28 – (Lebanon) Trans Mediterranean Airways loses two cargo planes (a Douglas DC-4 and a Douglas DC-6) during the 1968 Israeli raid on Beirut Airport. There are no deaths or injuries during the raid.

=== 1969 ===
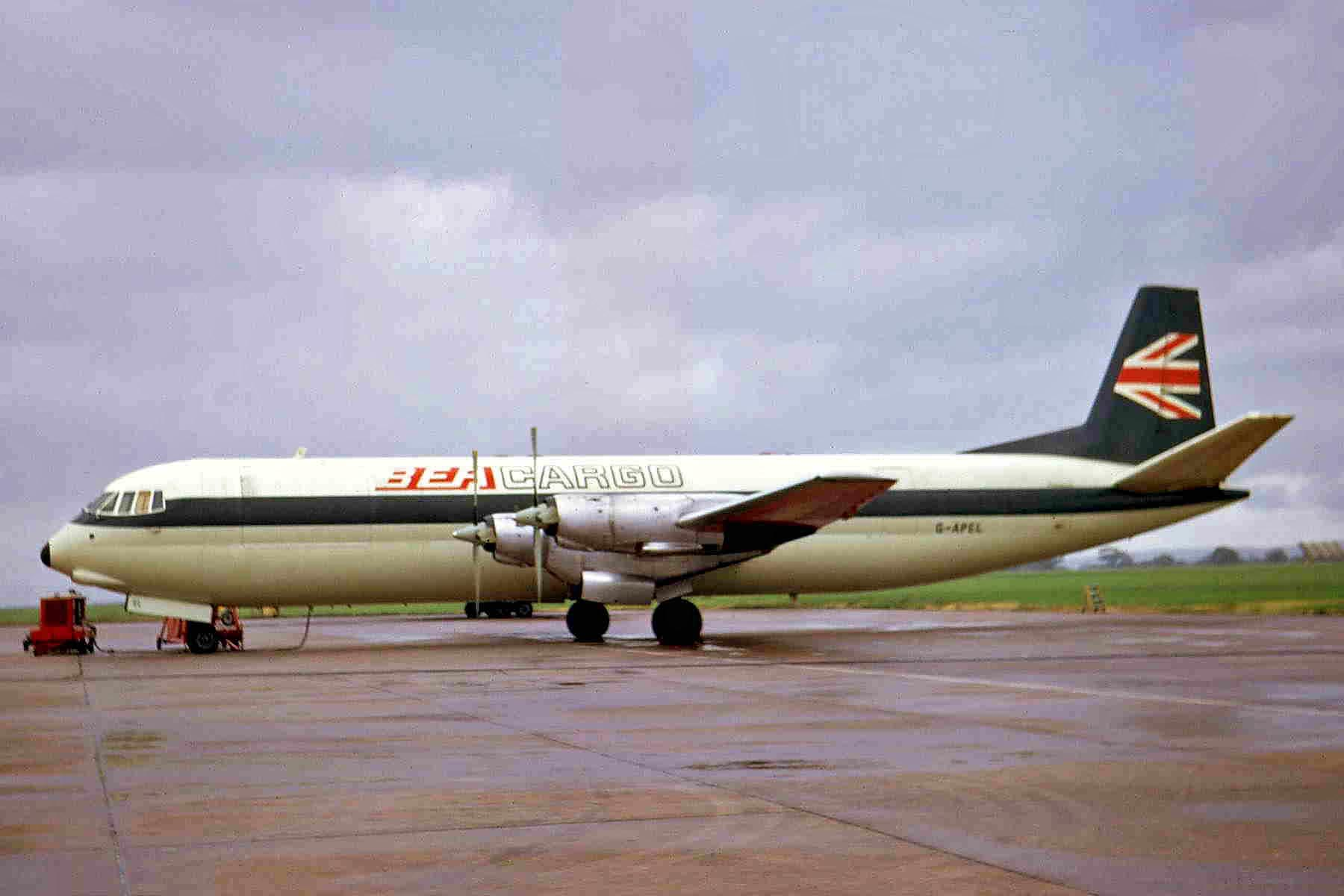
BEA Cargo V.953 Merchantman G-APEL at MAN, May 30, 1972.

- Undated – (United Kingdom) British European Airways (BEA) opened a new cargo centre at Heathrow, which it jointly operated with BOAC.
- Undated – (United Kingdom) To cope with increasing amounts of air freight, British European Airways (BEA) began replacing its now nine Armstrong Whitworth AW.660 Argosy freighters with the same number of Vickers V.953C Merchantmans, which were converted V.953 Vanguard passenger planes. Aviation Traders Engineering Limited (ATEL) of Southend converted the first two of these while BEA's inhouse engineering department converted the remainder using kits supplied by ATEL.
- Undated – (United States - Europe) Beginning in 1969, the United States military conducted recurring large-scale training operations known as "REFORGER" (Return of Forces to Germany). These exercises were intended to preserve NATO readiness by testing the rapid reinforcement of Europe. U.S. forces were transported by air to the continent, where they drew upon prepositioned equipment and subsequently took part in multinational NATO field maneuvers. The concept followed the operational model demonstrated earlier during Exercise BIG LIFT in 1963.
- March 18–19 – (United Kingdom - Anguilla) In Operation Sheepskin, the Royal Air Force airlifts 300 troops to Anguilla in response to the civil unrest that had broken out on the island.
- August 15 – (United States / Laos) Operation About Face begins in Laos. Air America helicopters airlift Meo and Thai guerrillas led by Vang Pao behind enemy positions while the Royal Lao Army pushes across the Plain of Jars. Heavy American air support peaks at 300 sorties per day.

== Airlines, companies and organizations founded ==
This decade, the following airlines or air cargo related companies or organizations were founded that were or would become important for air cargo and airmail history:

=== 1960 ===
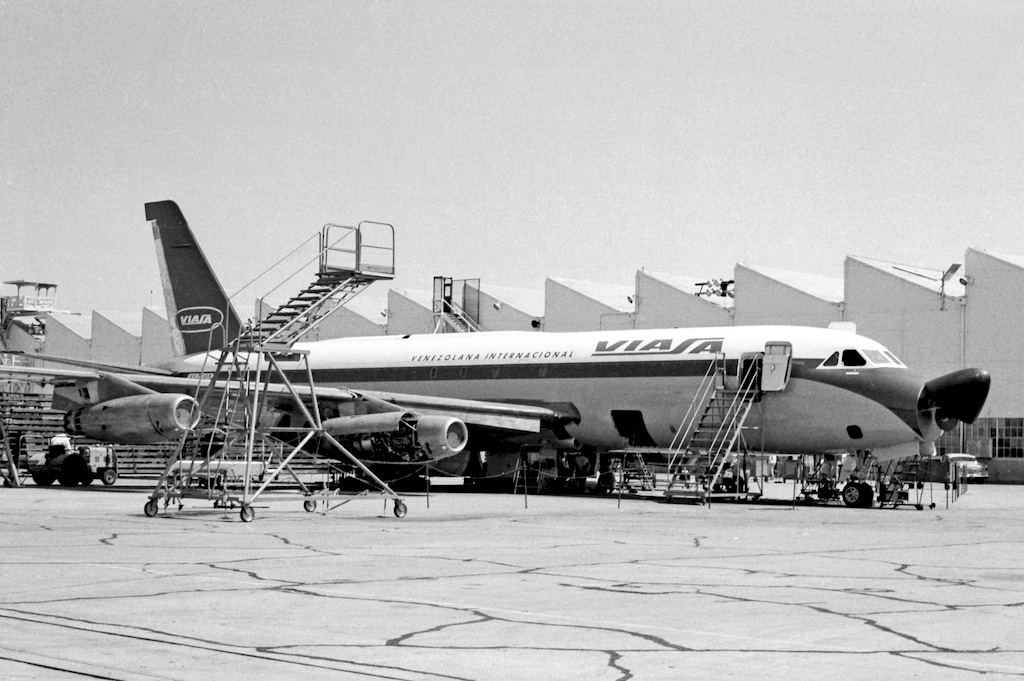
Viasa Convair CV-880 at San Diego Int'l Airport-Lindbergh Field - KSAN, USA - California, 1961 (Jon Proctor)

- March 29 – (Thailand) Thai International was founded – its air cargo operations began alongside the development of the airline's passenger network, initially transporting freight and mail in the lower holds of scheduled services. In 1988 it merged with Thai Airways Company into Thai Airways International.
- November 21 – (Venezuela) VIASA (Venezolana Internacional de Aviación, Sociedad Anónima) was founded – the airline commenced operations in 1961 and was the national flag carrier airline of Venezuela. VIASA began operations with jet equipment as a core part of its fleet strategy (initially via arrangements with KLM using Douglas DC-8 jets in 1961). This was significant for both passenger and cargo transport because jets, compared with piston aircraft, enabled faster, longer-range operations with more consistent belly cargo capacity. When VIASA commenced scheduled intercontinental services in 1961, its route network linked Venezuela with Europe (via stops) and the Americas, offering cargo hold capacity for mail and freight.

=== 1961 ===
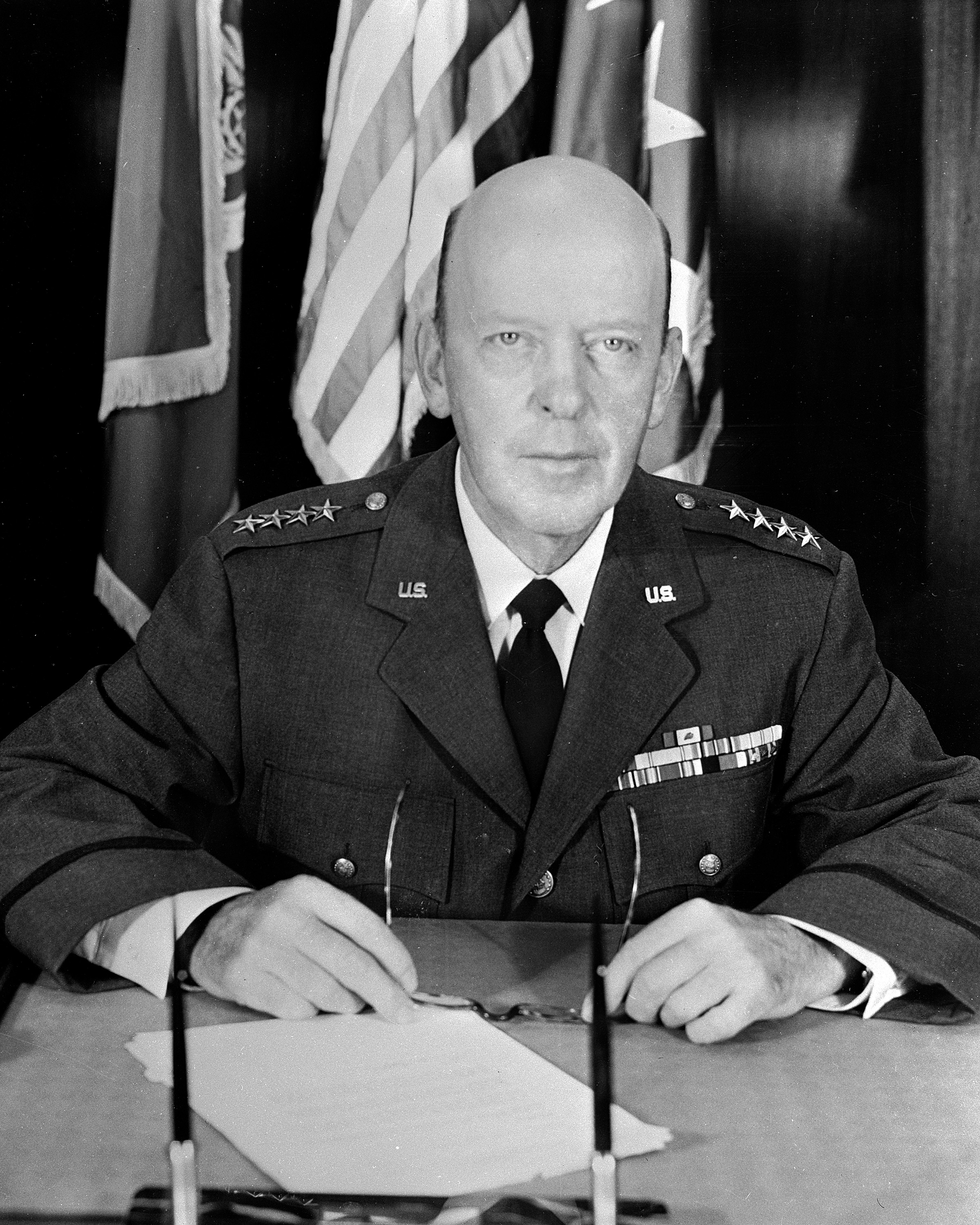
Portrait photograph of General William F. McKee as Commander, Air Force Logistics Command, taken between 1961 and 1962. Photo courtesy of the AFMC History Office, between 1961 and 1962.

- Undated – (Hong Kong) HK Aircargo Consolidators Association (HACA) was founded – this group evolved into Association of Hong Kong Air Freight Forwarding Agents (AHAFA) in 1966 which became the HK Association of HK Freight Forwarding Agents (HAFFA) in 1989 as more sea freight forwarders joined.
- Undated – (United States) Seaboard & Western Airlines changed its name to Seaboard World Airlines.
- April 1 – (United States) The United States Air Force redesignated the Air Materiel Command as the Air Force Logistics Command, with some of its functions transferred to the Air Force Systems Command.

=== 1962 ===
- Undated – (Ireland) Aer Turas Teoranta was founded – an airline and later a freight operator based in Dublin, from 1962 until May 2003.
- Undated – (United States) The International Air Cargo Forum (IACF) was first held in Atlanta, Georgia – the forum became a returning event. The International Air Cargo Association (TIACA) was launched as an association in the early 1990s, replacing the IACF.
- October 5 – (United Kingdom) Trans Meridian Flying Service, later evolved into Transmeridian Air Cargo, was founded – the company began operations on 1 November 1962 with a Douglas DC-4 on freight and charter routes in Europe. It would become a significant British freight carrier.

=== 1963 ===
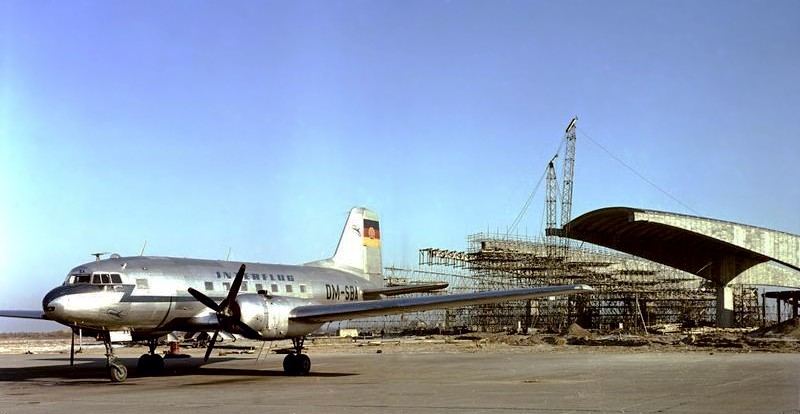
Berlin-Schönefeld under construction, Interflug (DM-SBA) Ilyushin Il-14 aircraft parked on the runway, January 1961.

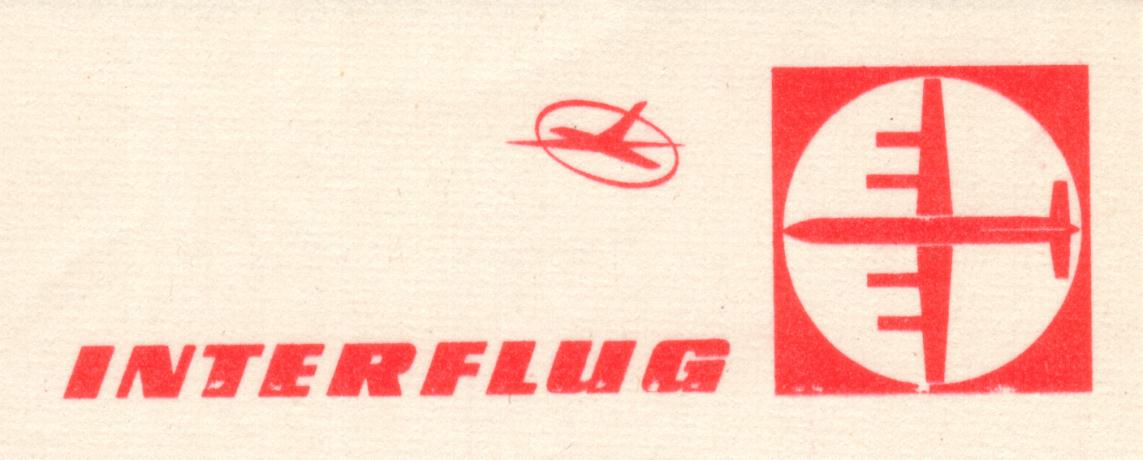
Interflug logo (Alter Fritz).

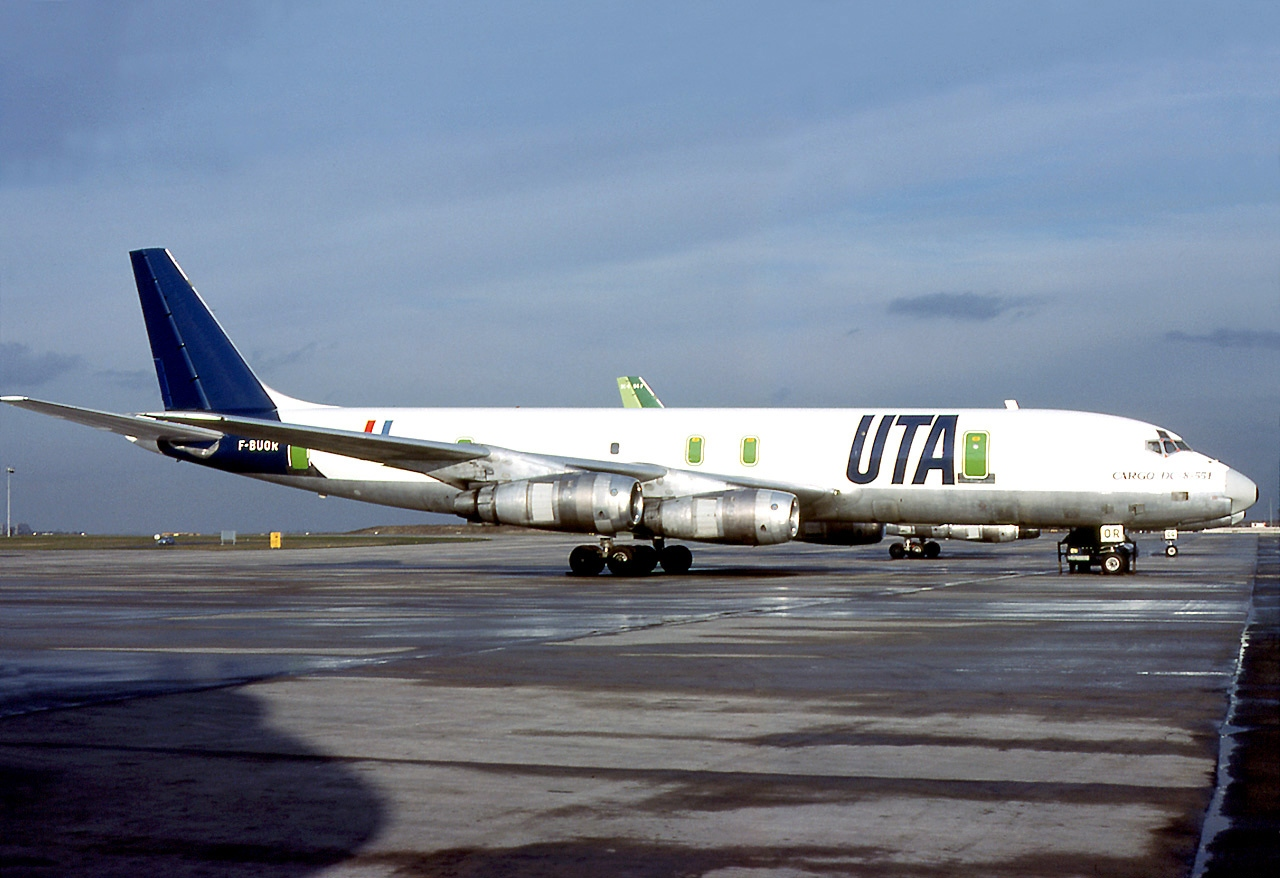
UTA (Union de Transports Aeriens) Cargo Douglas DC-8-55(F), UTA - Union de Transports Aeriens Cargo at Paris Charles de Gaulle (Roissy) (CDG / LFPG), France, March 21, 1979 (Michel Gilliand).

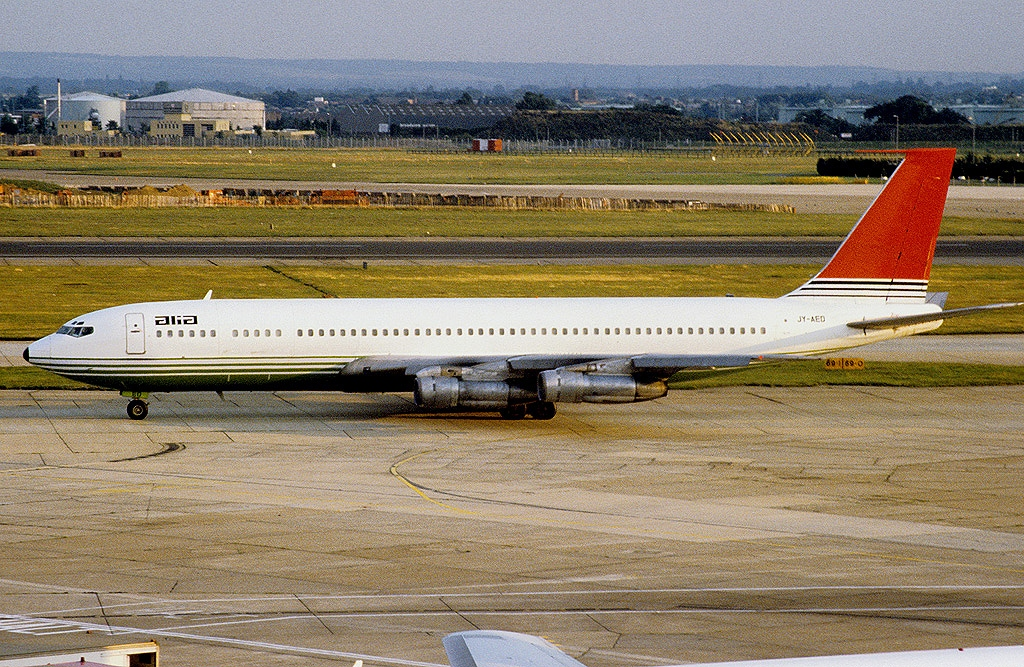
Alia / Royal Jordanian Cargo Boeing 707-321C operating flight RJ052, a freight flight from LHR-AMM, July 16, 1982.

- September 1 – (East Germany) Interflug became the East German national airline - Sued over its name for trademark violation by the West German airline Lufthansa – which had purchased the rights to the name of the defunct pre-1945 airline Deutsche Luft Hansa in August 1954 – and as a result unable to join the International Air Transport Association, the East German national airline Deutsche Lufthansa (DLH) is liquidated. Its staff, fleet, and route network are transferred to the already existing "back-up" company Interflug, which takes over as East Germany's national airline. Interflug functioned as the state-designated air carrier for international and domestic airmail of the German Democratic Republic (GDR) and transported official state mail, diplomatic mail, and commercial correspondence on behalf of Deutsche Post der DDR. It played a role in freight flows between the socialist bloc and non-aligned or developing countries, especially where Western airlines had limited access. Regular routes to Cuba, Vietnam, North Korea, Mongolia, and parts of Africa and the Middle East carried government cargo, spare parts, medical supplies, and high-priority freight. Routes often supported state-to-state agreements rather than purely commercial demand. Interflug operated under strict control of the Stasi, and also served military transport purposes, with many of its pilots trained for potential military missions as reserve officers of the National People's Army.
- October 1 – The French airlines Transports Aériens Intercontinentaux (TAI) and Union Aéromaritime de Transport (UAT) merge to form the new airline Union de Transports Aériens (UTA). Although primarily a passenger airline, its creation expanded the scale and efficiency of international air services, including carrying mail and freight in aircraft bellies, especially on long-haul routes between Europe and Africa/Asia. UTA quickly introduced jet service (e.g., DC-8 jets) on African networks as early as 1 November 1963, influencing cargo throughput potential
- December 9 – By royal decree of King Hussein, Alia, the future Royal Jordanian, is established as the flag carrier of Jordan - over time Royal Jordanian Cargo established key, long-standing (cargo) routes including Maastricht Aachen Airport, London Heathrow, Cairo, Dubai, and various destinations in North Africa and the Middle East, flying Boeing 707-320C, Airbus A310-300F and later Airbus A321-200/P2F freighters.

=== 1964 ===
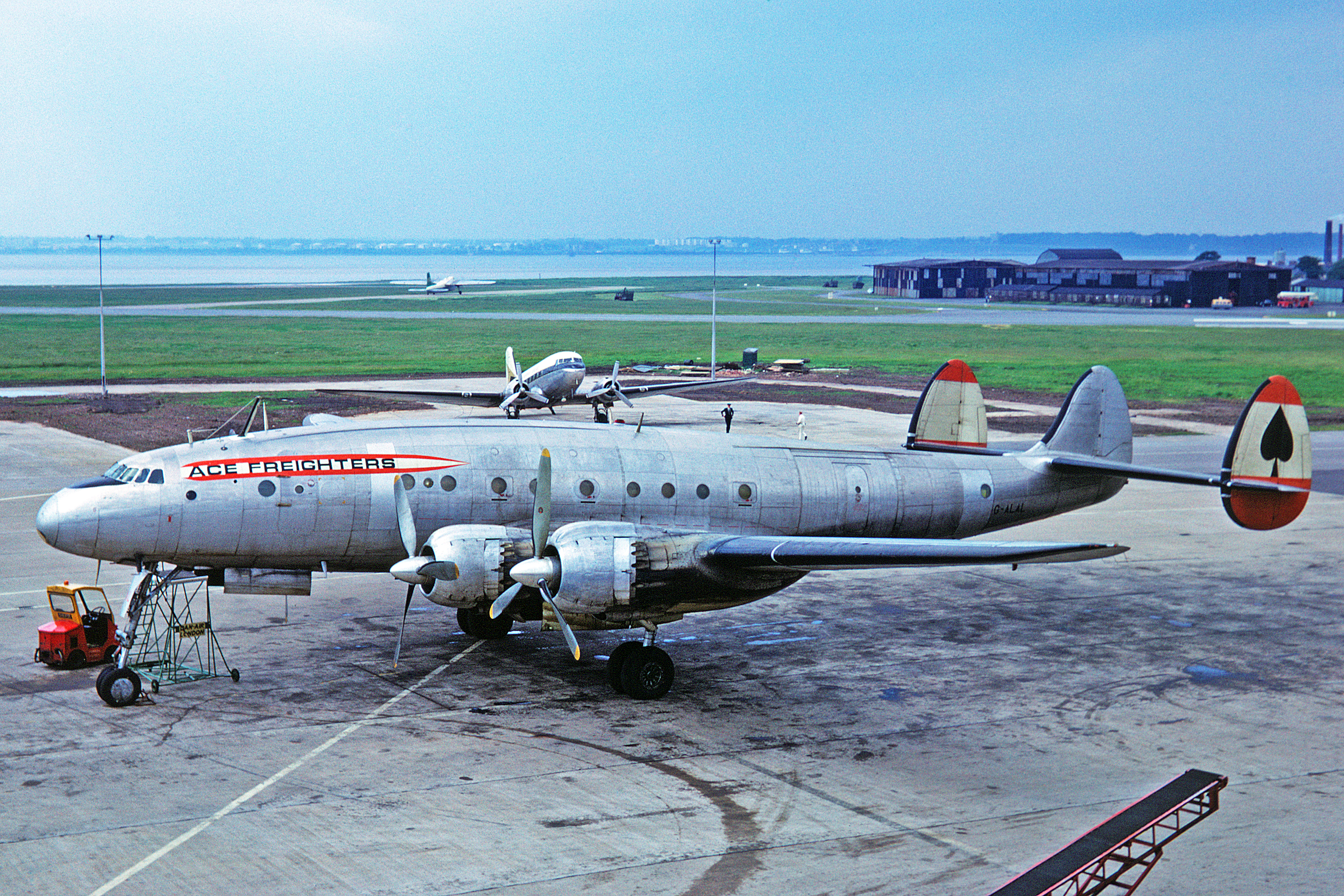
ACE Freighters L749A Constellation (G-ALAL) at Liverpool Airport, June 15, 1966.

- March 1 – (United Kingdom) ACE Freighters was founded - A new British all-cargo airline ACE Freighters (Aviation Charter Enterprises) was established in 1964, commencing freight operations from London Gatwick on 1 March 1964. It operated Lockheed Constellations and conducted worldwide charter cargo flights, including ad-hoc freight and military contracts for the British Ministry of Defence. Its emergence marked part of the growing supplemental all-cargo airline segment in the UK air freight market.
- September 30 – (United Kingdom) Tippers Air Transport Ltd (UK) was registered - Coventry-based aviation operator Tippers Air Transport Ltd was registered on 30 September 1964, adding to a wave of smaller cargo flight operators entering the market in the mid-1960s.

=== 1966 ===
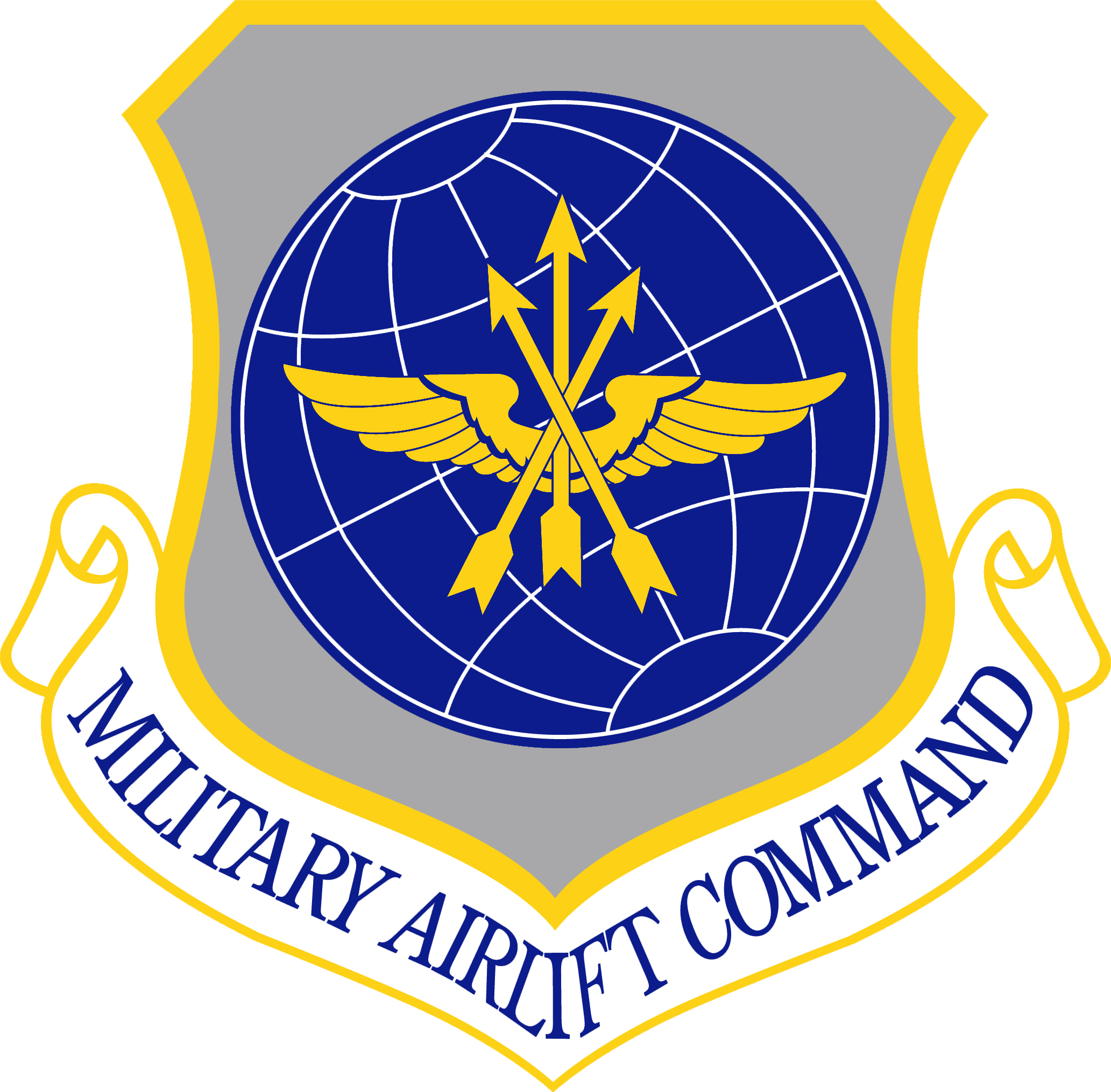
USAF - Military Airlift Command emblem.

- January 1 – (United States) The U.S. Military Air Transport Service is redesignated the Military Airlift Command.

=== 1967 ===
- July 19 – (United States) The last U.S. Navy component of the Military Airlift Command, VR-3 (Air Transport Squadron 3), is disestablished at McGuire Air Force Base, New Jersey. From then on, the Military Airlift Command consists only of U.S. Air Force components.

=== 1968 ===
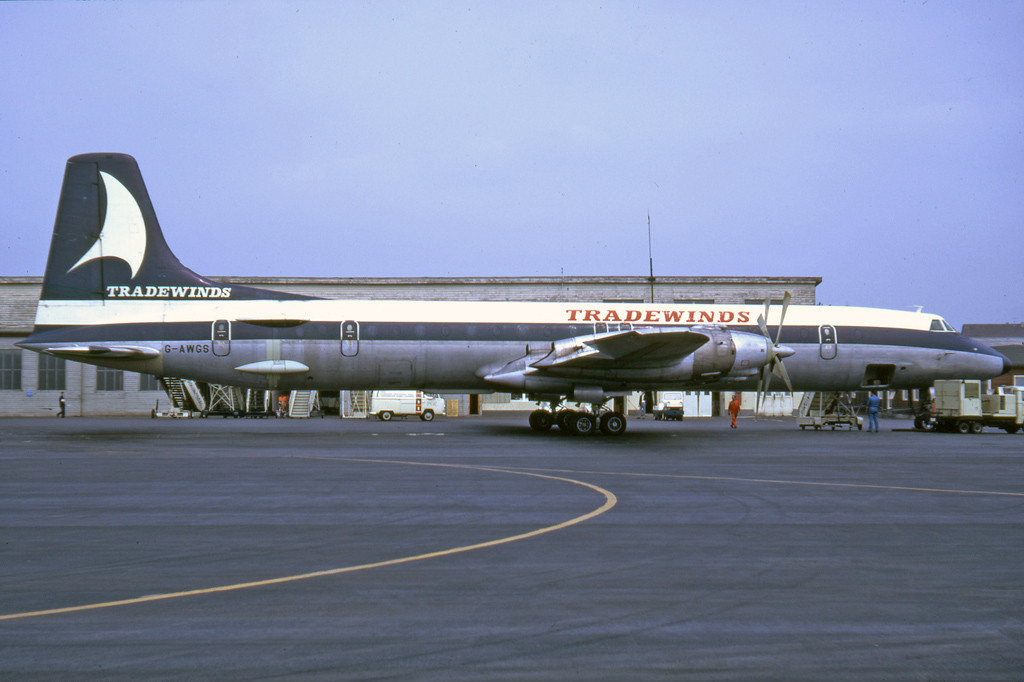
Tradewinds Airways Canadair CL-44D4-2, G-AWGS, May 10, 1971

- November – (United Kingdom ) Tradewinds Airways was founded after the collapse of Transglobe Airways under the name BOBWOOD and flew charter flights from its base at London Gatwick (LGW) airport, using Canadair CL-44-D4 aircraft previously operated by Transglobe. In January 1969 the name was changed to Tradewinds Airways but since Seaboard World Airlines (a USA based company) had a large interest in Tradewinds, the British Government would not issue a license. By April 1969 the majority of the stock was passed on to British nationals and the company was able to start operations later in 1969.

=== 1969 ===
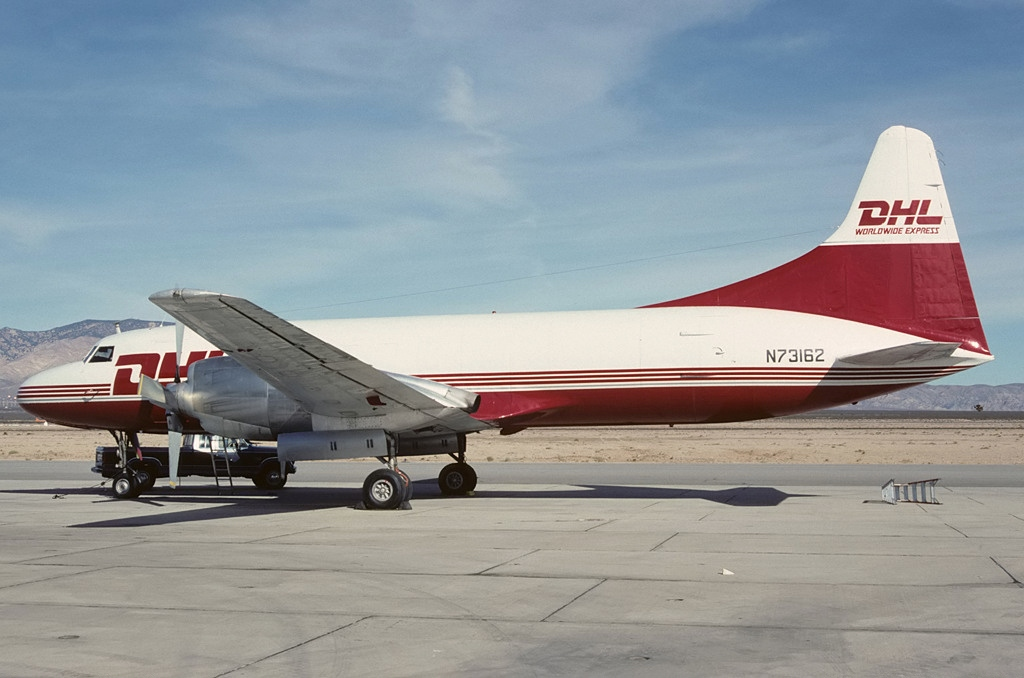
DHL (DHL Airways) Convair 580(F), Mojave (MHV), California USA, October 30, 1989 (Mike Freer).

- Undated – (Venezuela) VIASA established a dedicated cargo subsidiary named "Transportes Aereos de Carga SA", more commonly known as "Transcarga", which operated a leased Douglas DC-8F freighter (registration N804SW). The aircraft was used on cargo services linking Caracas and Maracaibo with international destinations including Miami, Panama, and New York.
- September 25 – (United States) DHL (originally named after founders Dalsey, Hillblom and Lynn) is founded – DHL is a multinational logistics company, founded in San Francisco, California, United States and currently headquartered in Bonn, Germany, expanded its service throughout the world by the late 1970s. Today, it provides worldwide courier, package delivery, and express mail services, but also forwarding and supply chain (warehousing, transport and value-added) services.

== First flights ==
This decade, the following aircraft that were or would become important for air cargo and airmail history had their first flight:

=== 1960 ===
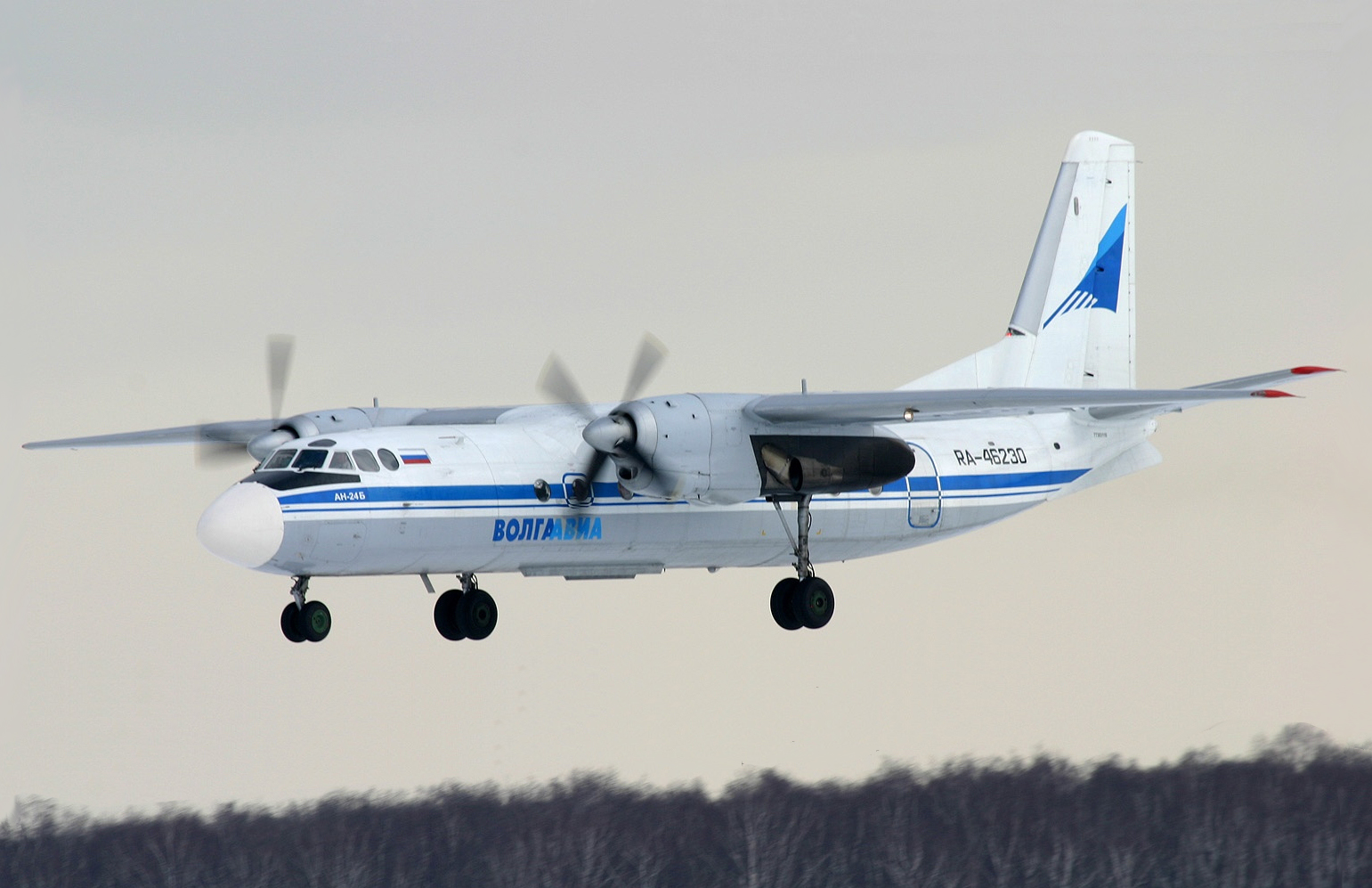
Volga-Avia Antonov An-24 landing, March 31, 2005 (Dmitriy Pichugin).

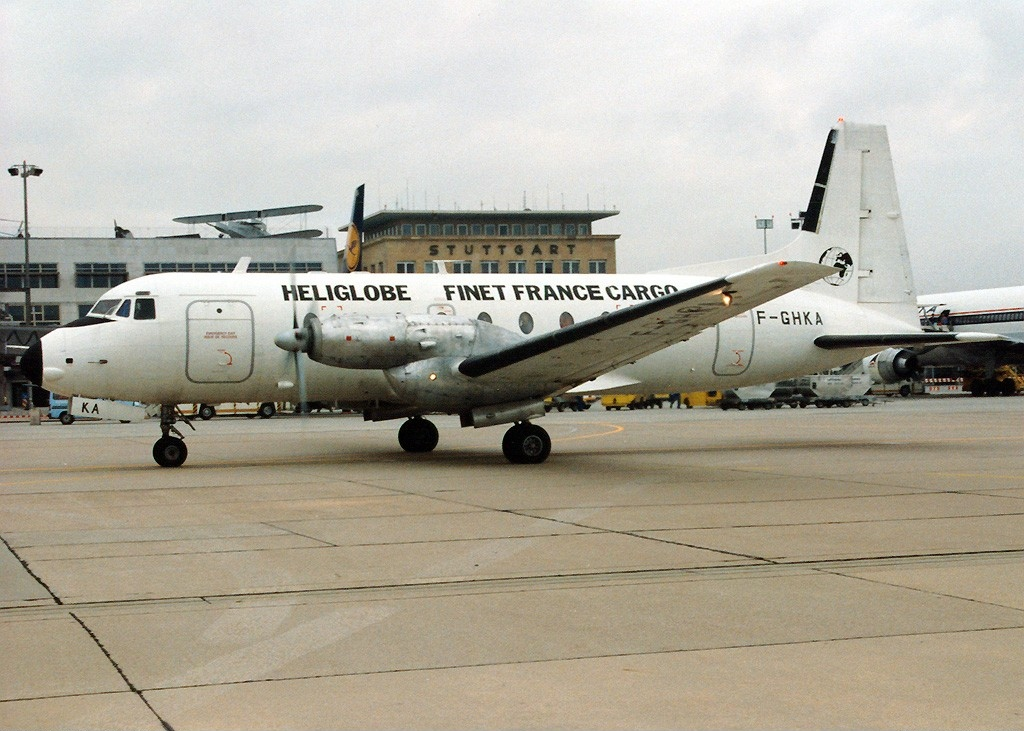
Heliglobe Finet France Cargo Hawker Siddeley HS-748 Srs2A-263 F-GHKA, Stuttgart (- Echterdingen) (STR / EDDS), Germany, July 27, 1994.

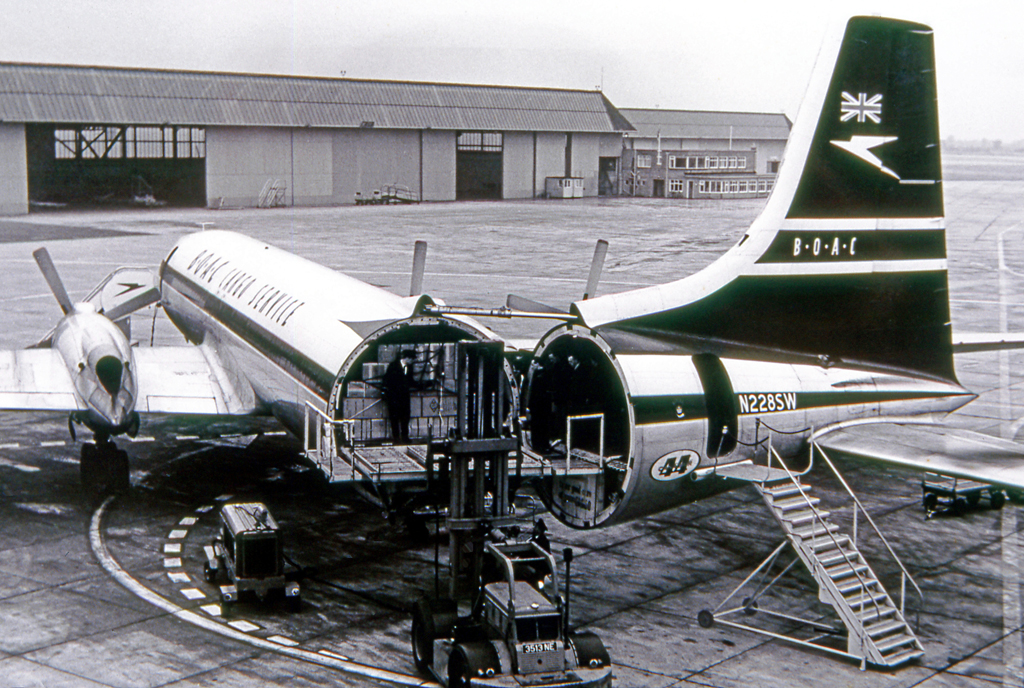
Canadair CL-44 N228SW of Seaboard World operating for BOAC in 1963.

- January 19 – (United States) Convair CV-580 Super Convair – a low wing, twin-engined turboprop-driven short-to-medium-range passenger/mail/freight airliner, developed by Convair from their CV-240 series. Cargo / mail compartments on cabin level, and under the cabin floor, accessible through ventral cargo hatches. Cargo capacity (CV-240 basis): 832kg.
- March 29 – (Soviet Union) Tupolev Tu-124 (NATO reporting name "Cookpot") – a short-range (regional) twin-jet passenger/mail/freight airliner. It had low pressure tires for operation from unpaved airfields. Cargo capacity: 792kg + diplomatic mail locker.
- April – (Soviet Union) Antonov An-24 (NATO reporting name "Coke") – a twin turboprop short- to medium-haul transport/passenger aircraft, optimised for operating from rough strips and unprepared airports in remote locations. Chairs could be (partly) removed to create cargo space in the cabin (front) for up to 5.500 kg depending on variant and flying distance. Three baggage, mail and cargo compartments are on the same level as the passengers. For larger cargo items there was a loading door at the front of the hull. Around 1,000 units are built in various versions, including a T "Transport" version with a ventral loading hatch and a cargo winch.
- June 24 – (United Kingdom) Avro 748, Hawker Siddely / BAe / HAL HS 748 – a low wing, twin-engined turboprop-driven short-range (regional) STOL passenger/mail/freight airliner, originally developed by Avro. Many of the aircraft were used as a quick-change combi, with a movable bulkhead, separating the cargo in front from the passengers in the back, or as a full freighter with up to 6.000 kg payload.
- November 16 – (Canada) Canadair CL-44 – a four-engined turboprop long-haul passenger/cargo airliner and transport aircraft based on the Bristol Britannia, developed and produced by Canadair. The freighter version could carry up to 66,048 lb (29,959 kg) of cargo and had a unique 'swing-tail' design. Seaboard World Airlines, Flying Tiger Line, Slick Airways were the original all-cargo customers for the aircraft.
- December 6 – (United States) Sikorsky S-61L – a twin-engine single rotor passenger / aerial cargo lift helicopter designed and built by Sikorsky Aircraft.

=== 1961 ===
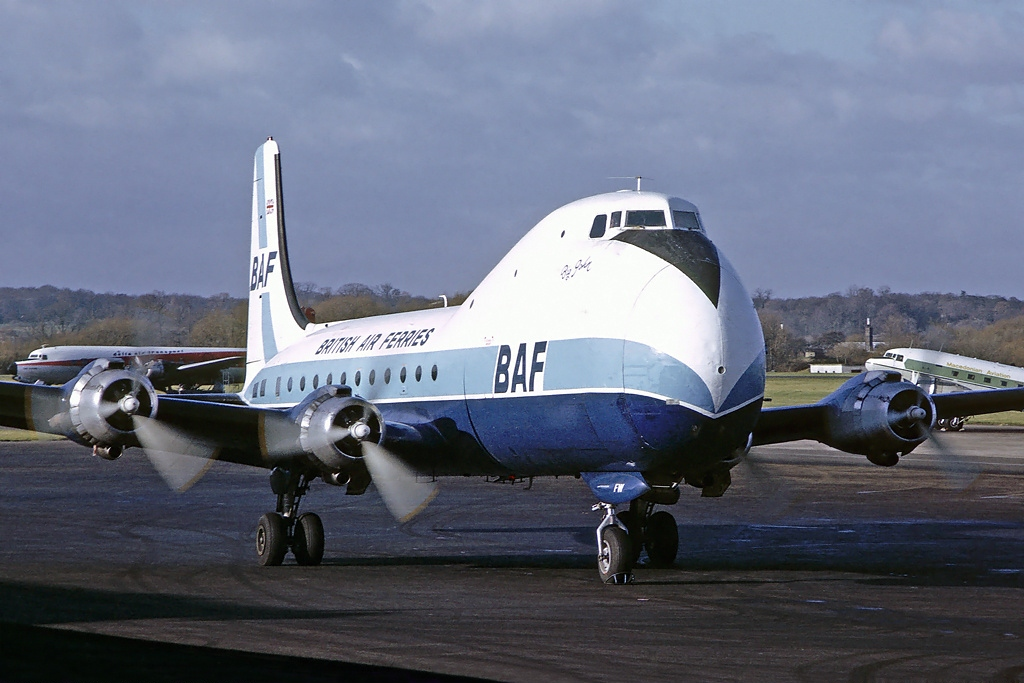
Aviation Traders ATL-98 Carvair, British Air Ferries (BAF) at Southend - Rochford (SEN / EGMC), UK - England, November 25, 1974.

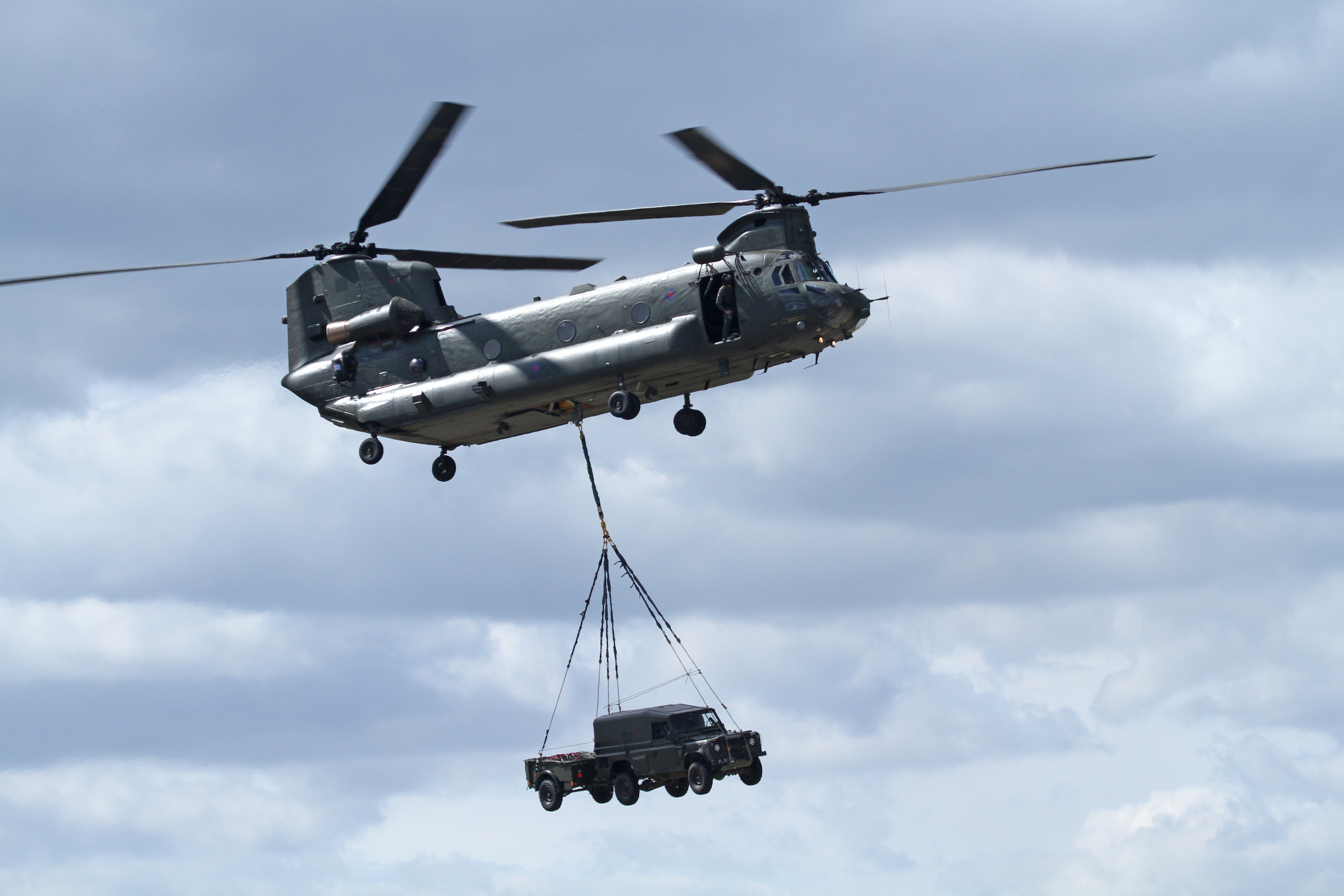
Boeing Chinook HC2 1, July 24, 2010 (Ronnie Macdonald).

- January 24 – (United States) Convair 990 – a narrow-body four-engined long-haul passenger/mail/freight jet airliner. Cargo capacity was 2147 kg; cargo and mail were stored in dedicated underfloor baggage and cargo compartments, which were divided into forward and aft sections to balance the aircraft's weight.
- February 28 – (United States) Cessna 336 Skymaster – a twin-engine short-medium haul civil utility aircraft built in a push-pull configuration. The most common location for large cargo was by removing the rear and/or middle passenger seats, providing a large, flat, unobstructed floor area. A small, dedicated cargo compartment was available in the nose. An optional fiberglass cargo pack (pod) added under the fuselage could carry roughly 136 kg /300 lbs of additional cargo.
- May 2 – (Switzerland) Pilatus PC-6 Turbo-Porter a single-engined STOL short-haul utility aircraft designed by Pilatus Aircraft. The Pilatus PC-6 Porter can carry a maximum payload of approximately 2,646 lbs (1,200 kg) of cargo or mail. This weight is carried within a spacious, flat-floored main cabin (over 3 cubic meters) accessed via large sliding doors on both sides, allowing for easy loading of bulky freight, mail bags, or supplies.
- June 21 – (United Kingdom) Aviation Traders Carvair – a four piston-engined short-haul air ferry conversion of the Douglas DC-4, developed by Freddie Laker's Aviation Traders (Engineering) Limited (ATL). It had a capacity of 22 passengers in a rear cabin, and five cars loaded in at the front. Full freighter and quick-change versions were made as well.
- September 21 – (United States) Boeing CH-47 Chinook – a heavy-lift, tactical military transport tandem-rotor helicopter, originally developed by American rotorcraft company Vertol. The Chinook is capable of carrying up to 10 metric tonnes (roughly 22,000 to 24,000 lbs) of internal or external (sling-loaded) cargo . The Chinook has a triple hook external load system, an internal cargo winch and a roller conveyor for handling cargo.

=== 1962 ===
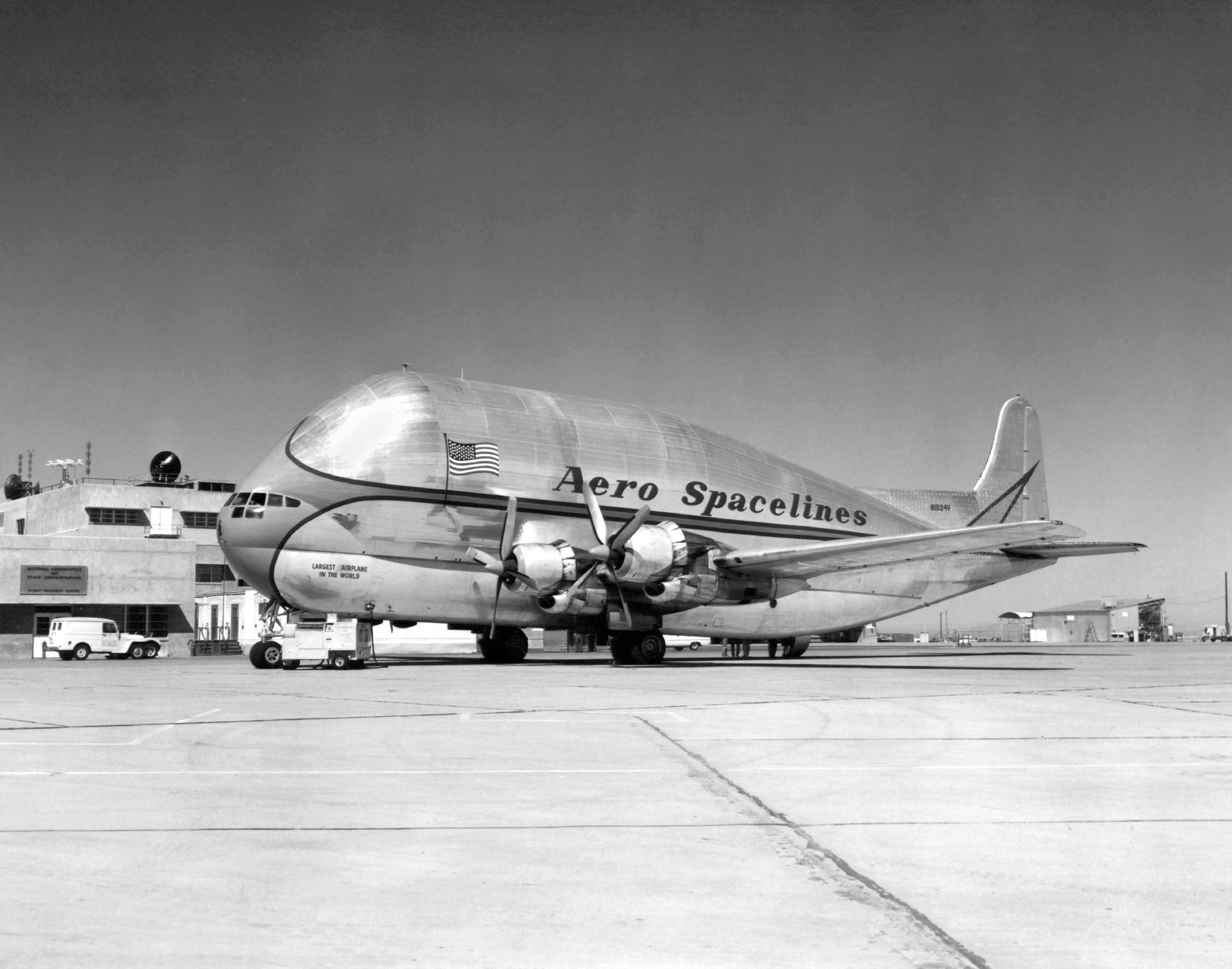
The Aero Spacelines B-377PG Pregnant Guppy outsized cargo aircraft incorporated the wings, engines, lower fuselage and tail from a Boeing 377 Stratocruiser with a huge upper fuselage more than 20 feet in diameter. The modified aircraft was built to transport outsized cargo for NASA's Apollo program, primarily to carry portions of the Saturn 5 rockets from the manufacturer to Cape Canaveral. October 1962.

- September 19 – (United States) Aero Spacelines Pregnant Guppy – a large, wide-bodied four-piston engined short-to-medium-haul cargo aircraft built in the United States and used for ferrying outsized cargo. The Pregnant Guppy (377PG) could carry a maximum payload of approximately 30,000 to 34,000 pounds (about 13,600 to 15,400 kg) and was specifically designed to transport large, bulky rocket components, most notably the Saturn I S-IV second stage for NASA.
- December 7 – (France) Aérospatiale SA 321 Super Frelon – a three-engined heavy-lift long-range transport helicopter produced by aerospace manufacturer Sud Aviation. Cargo was carried in the main cabin, which featured a rear-loading ramp. The cabin was equipped with two electric winches on overhead rails to facilitate loading and moving heavy items. Maximum Payload: Up to 5,000 kg (11,024 lb) for short distances (approx. 40 km). Typical Payload: Approximately 2,750 kg (6,063 lb) for longer-range missions (approx. 825 km).

=== 1963 ===
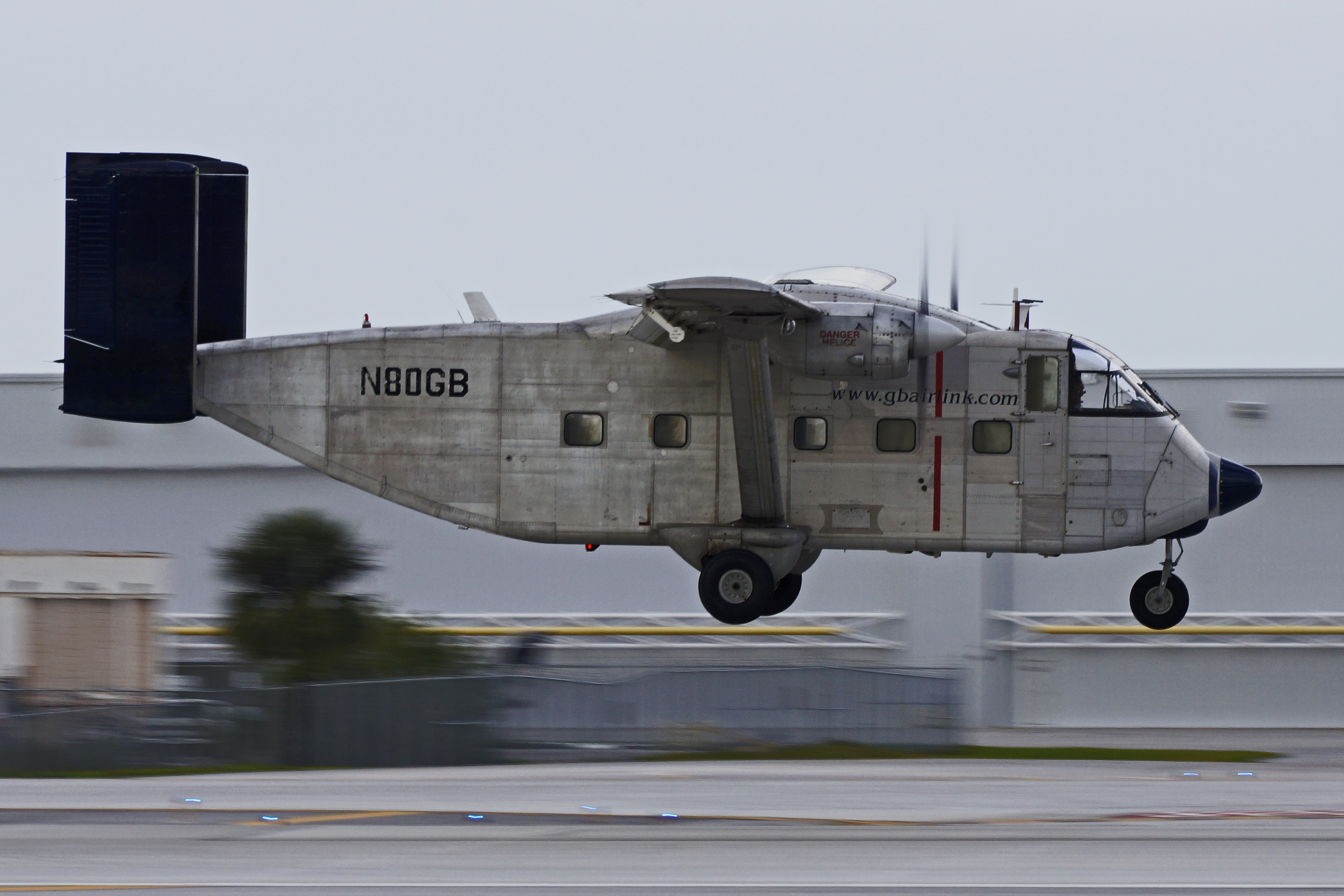
GB AirLink Short Skyvan on finals at Miami, February 6, 2015 {JT Occhialini}.

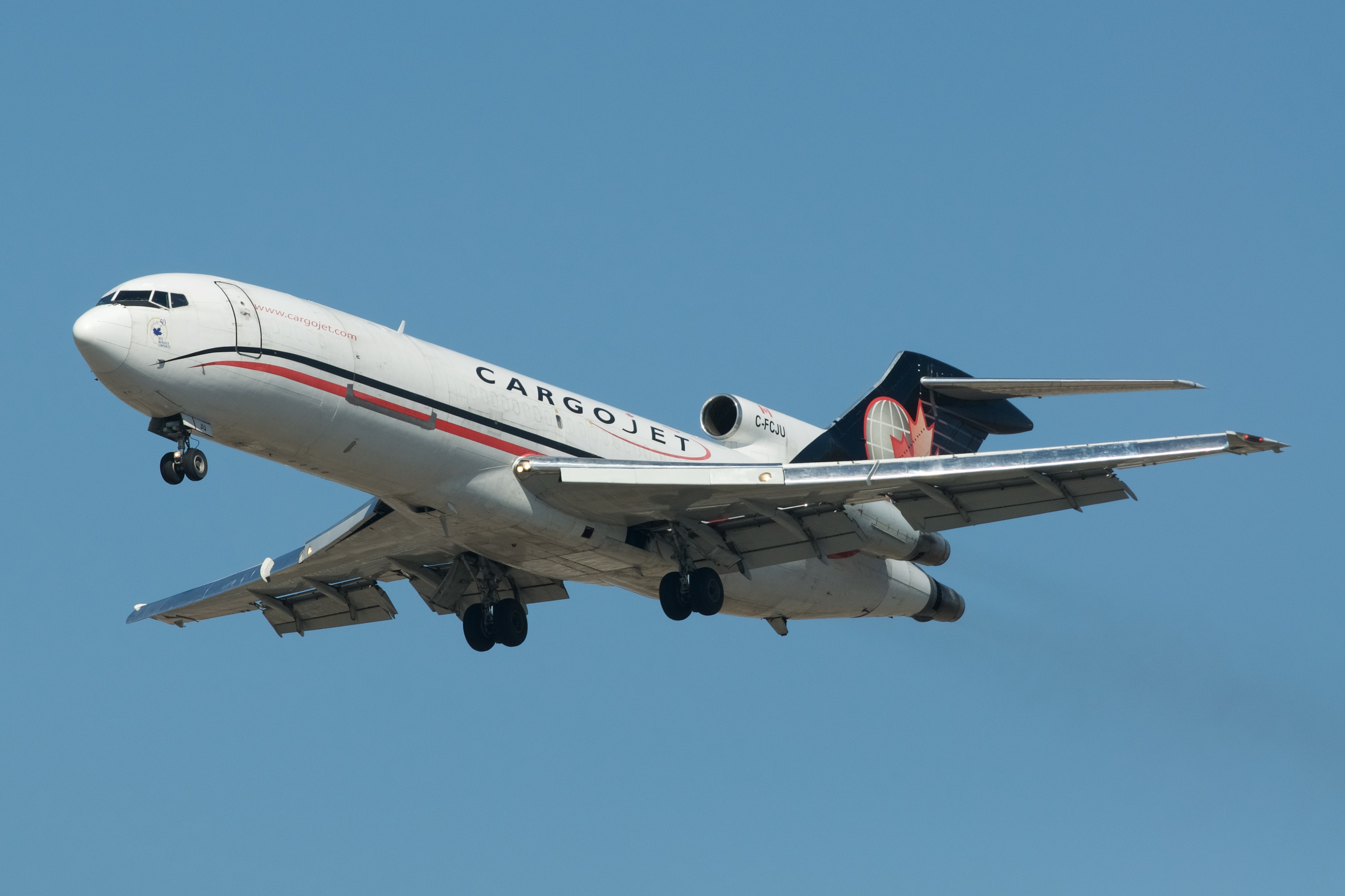
CargoJet Boeing 727-200F C-FCJU, March 11 2012.

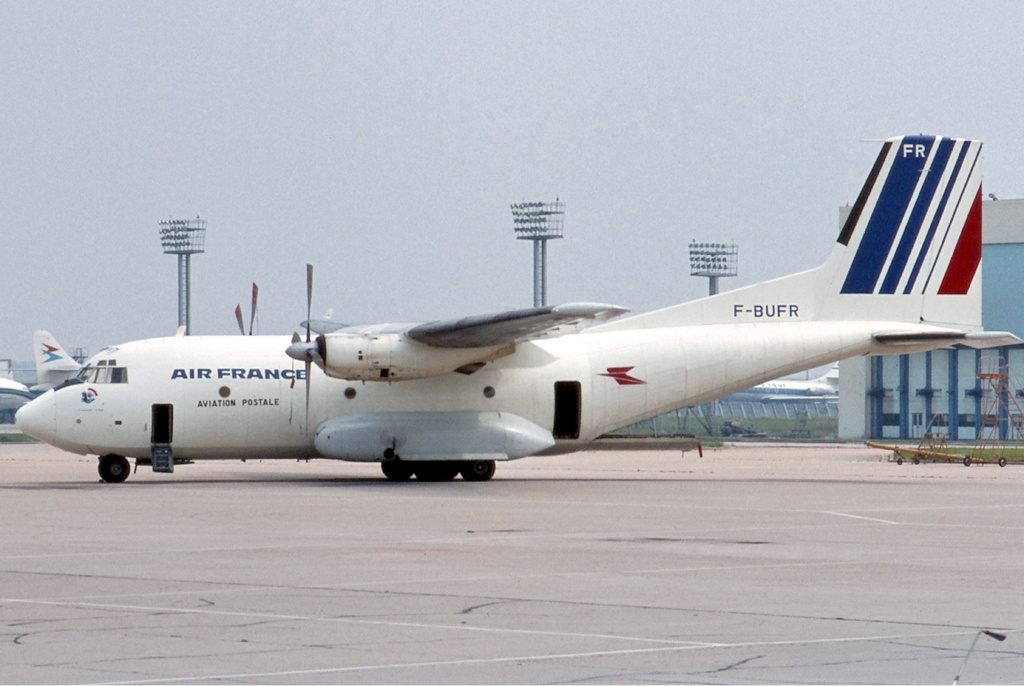
Air France Aviation Postale Transall C-160P, July 30, 1980 (Udo Haafke).

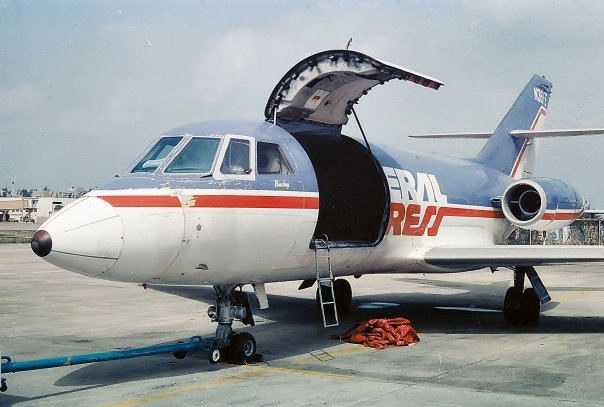
Federal Express Dassault Falcon (Mystere) 20DC N36FE (cn 218) "Becky", San Juan - Luis Muñoz Marin International (SJU/TJSJ) - Puerto Rico, 1981-1983 (Tomás Del Coro).

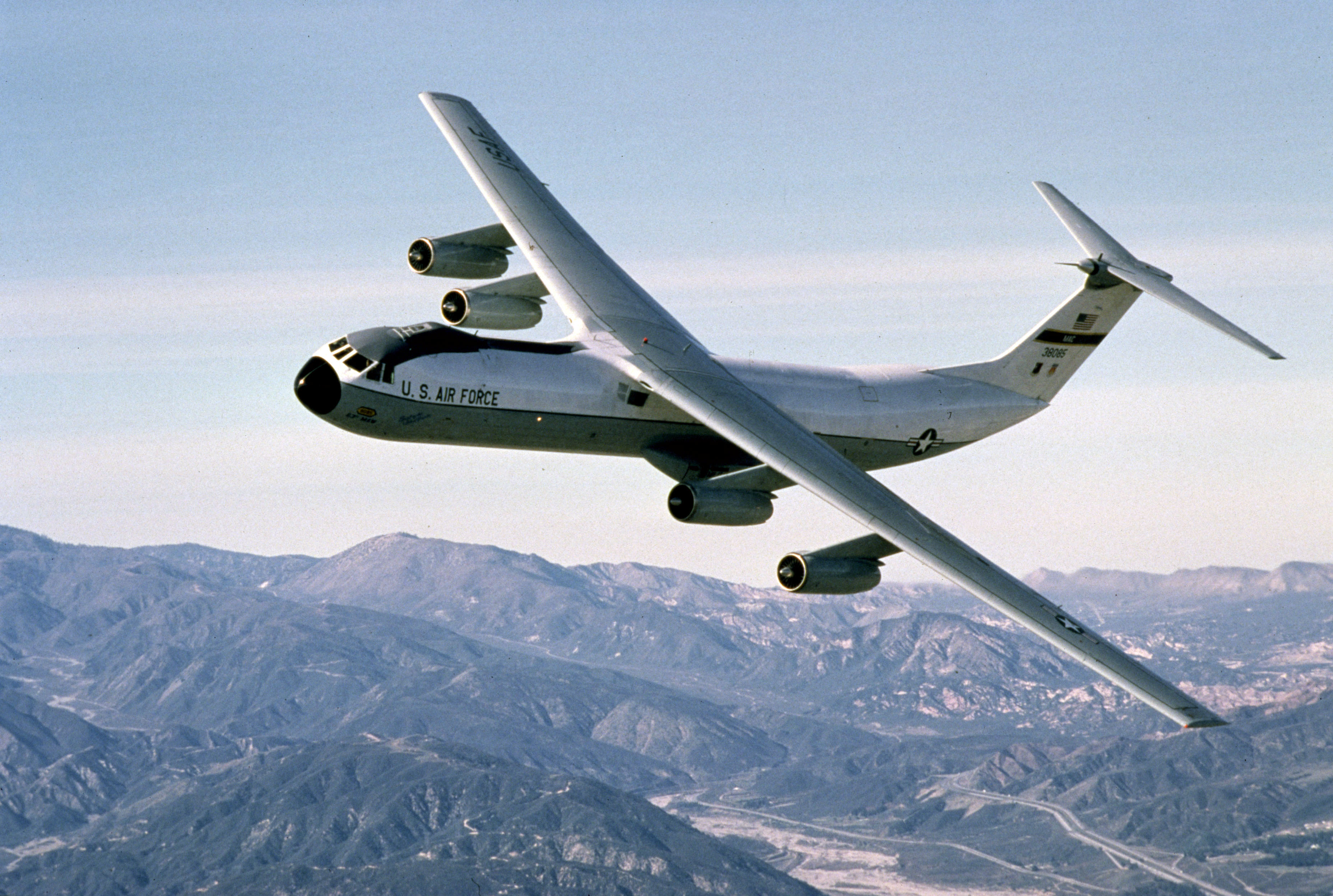
A U.S. Air Force Lockheed C-141B-10-LM Starlifter (in October 1984?).

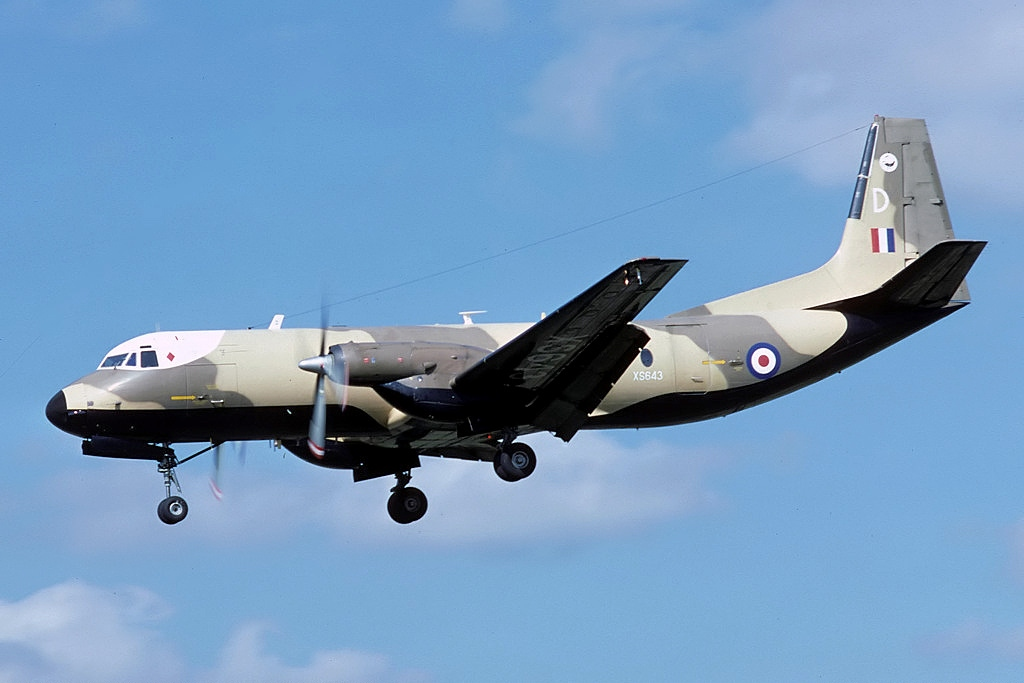
Hawker Siddeley HS-780 Andover C1, UK Air Force, Brize Norton (BZZ / EGVN), UK - England, February 1978 (Mike Freer).

- January 3 – (Soviet Union) Ilyushin IL-62 – a Soviet four-engined long-haul narrow-body passenger/mail/freight jetliner designed by Ilyushin. While designed for passengers, it was known for its robust cargo capabilities and could carry 10,000 kg of payload over 10,000 km in later M variants.
- January 17 – (United Kingdom) Short SC.7 Skyvan – a twin-turboprop short-haul STOL airliner, later often used for freight and skydiving. The original Short SC.7 Skyvan could carry approximately 4,600 to 5,157 pounds (2,086 kg to 2,339 kg) of cargo/mail in its main cabin. Designed as a "flying shoebox" it features a large, unobstructed box-shaped cargo hold behind the cockpit, with loading via a wide rear ramp, frequently using a roller floor system. The cabin is designed for rapid conversion between seating and cargo, allowing for mail containers, palletized, or bulk cargo loading.
- February 9 – (United States) Boeing 727 – a three engined short- to medium-haul narrow-body passenger/mail/cargo jetliner. The primary cargo area for mail and baggage on passenger 727s was located in the lower "belly" holds, divided into forward and aft compartments. The Boeing 727-100C/QC (Convertible / Quick Change) could carry up to 38,000 lbs (17,000 kg) of cargo when fully converted to a freighter; in this configuration, it held eight cargo pallets on the main deck. The Boeing 727-100F (Dedicated Freighter) had a maximum structural payload of roughly 47,000 lbs. The Boeing 727-200F (Dedicated Freighter) was a longer version with a maximum payload of 50,000 to 54,000 lbs (22,700–24,500 kg), and could hold 11 to 12 pallets. The 727 was one of the first planes capable of using standard, large aviation pallets (like the 125" x 88" ULD).
- February 25 – (France / Germany) Transall C.160 – a medium-range tactical military transport aircraft. It was designed for short takeoff and landing (STOL) capability, enabling it to operate from rough, unprepared, or short airstrips. The Transall C-160 military transport (and the C-160P Postal version) could carry a maximum payload of up to 16,000 kg (approx. 35,275 lbs) of cargo or mail, depending on the range. This cargo was carried in the main fuselage, which measured approximately 13.5 meters long, 3.15 meters wide, and 2.98 meters high, allowing for 93 troops or 62 stretchers in addition to freight. The fuselage featured a rear ramp/door for loading, and the aircraft could kneel (raise its landing gear) to lower the fuselage for easier, low-level loading of vehicles and palletized mail.
- May 4 – (France) Dassault Falcon 20 – a twin-engined medium-haul (or mid-size) business jet designed for regional and mid-range missions. The Dassault Falcon 20 cargo version, which launched the Federal Express (FedEx) network in 1973, was modified specifically for small-package, high-priority cargo transport. This version could carry approximately 4,500 lbs (2,041 kg) of cargo/mail, in approximately 388 to 449 cubic feet of usable space, in the form of 5 standard small-aircraft pallets or hundreds of small boxes. The entire cabin area behind the cockpit to the rear bulkhead was converted into a single, open cargo hold. Passenger seats, toilets, and galleys were removed, and the floor was reinforced. Loading was facilitated by a large, hydraulically operated cargo door measuring 73-74.5 inches wide by 55 inches high, located on the left side of the forward fuselage, directly behind the cockpit and forward of the wing.
- July 29 – (Soviet Union) Tupolev Tu-134 (NATO reporting name "Crusty") – a twin-engined short-to-medium-haul narrow-body passenger/mail/cargo jetliner, designed for regional and domestic routes. The Tu-134 has two main baggage/cargo compartments located in the underfloor section of the fuselage. These compartments are loaded through doors located on the right side of the fuselage. Extra space for cargo, mail, or luggage was available in the main cabin, with approximately 9.75 m³ of additional space. A full cargo version based on the Tu-134A was projected but never built.
- August 20 – (United Kingdom) BAC One-Eleven – a twin-engined short- to medium-haul narrow-body jetliner. The BAC One-Eleven had a total baggage/cargo capacity of 534 cubic feet (15.12m3). Cargo and mail were carried in lower-deck holds located beneath the cabin floor, designed for efficient baggage handling. It was a short-haul jet designed for passenger service, but its holds were sufficient for 676 kg of mail and small freight.
- December 17 – (United States) C-141 Starlifter – a four-engined long-haul military strategic airlifter, the first large jet transport specifically designed for strategic airlift (troops + cargo). The Lockheed C-141 Starlifter could carry roughly 62,000 to 70,000 pounds of cargo (including mail) in its main 70-foot long, 10-foot wide cargo bay. The cargo was loaded directly onto a roller system on the floor for easy, rapid palletized freight handling. Cargo was stored in the main compartment, which measured 70 feet long, 10 feet wide, and 9 feet high. It utilized 10-13 standard 463L master pallets for cargo, which were loaded via the aft ramp/door. The floor could be adjusted from a roller system for pallets to a smooth floor for vehicles. The aircraft was designed to carry diverse loads, including pallets, vehicles, or up to 103-154 troops/passengers depending on the configuration.
- December 21 – (United Kingdom) Hawker Siddeley Andover – a twin-engined turboprop short-to-medium range STOL military tactical transport aircraft. Designed for the Royal Air Force (RAF) as a military freighter and transport, it was intended to operate from short, unimproved airstrips. The main cargo hold was accessed via a rear loading ramp, allowing for easy loading of vehicles and pallets. It had a total load volume of 55 m3 (1,942 ft3). The aircraft featured a unique "kneeling" undercarriage, which allowed the fuselage floor to be raised or lowered to match the height of truck tailgates for efficient loading.

=== 1964 ===
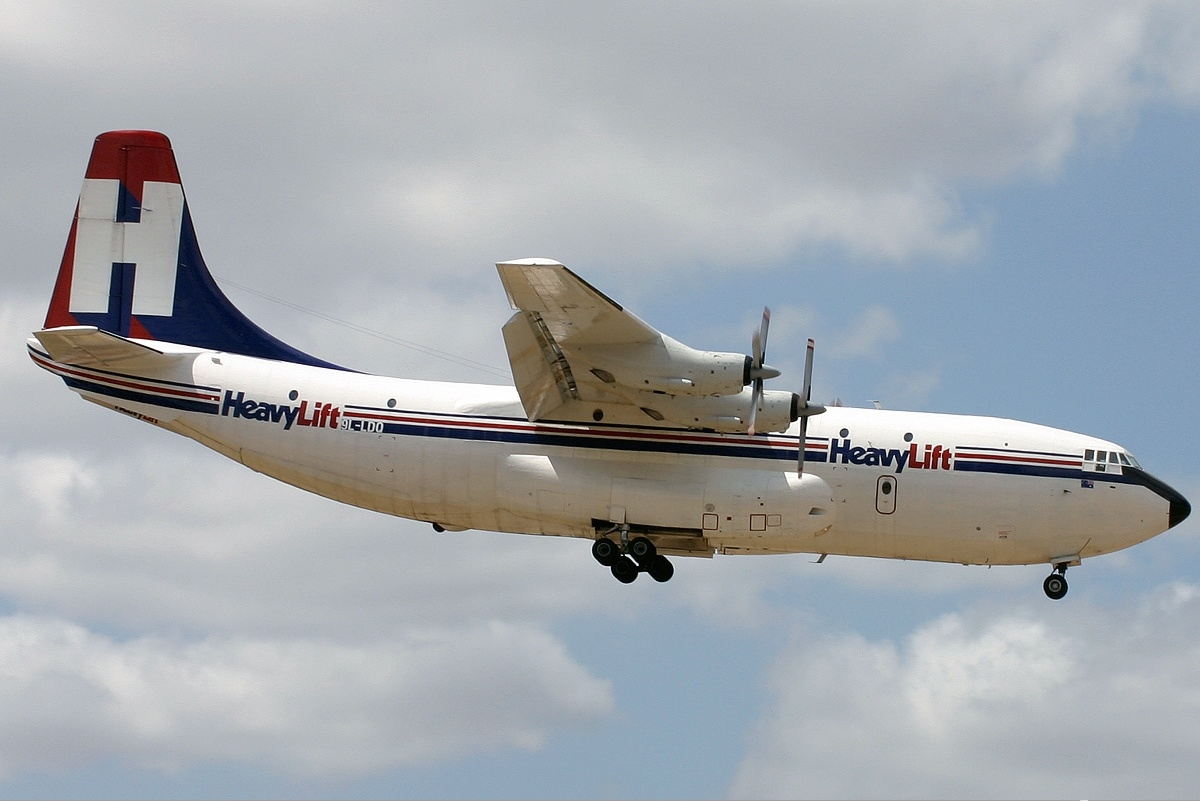
HeavyLift Cargo Airlines Shorts Belfast at Perth Airport, May 7, 2004 (Montague Smith).

- January 5 – (United Kingdom) Shorts Belfast – a four-engined turboprop long-haul, heavy-lift strategic transport aircraft designed for the Royal Air Force (RAF); a few of them sold and recertified later for commercial use. It was capable of transporting heavy cargo, such as tanks and helicopters, over long distances—up to 4,609 nautical miles with maximum fuel. The Shorts Belfast (specifically the C.Mk 1 variant operated by the RAF) was designed to carry up to 78,000 lbs (35,380 kg) to 81,000 lbs (36,740 kg) of cargo. The primary, pressurized, 84-foot-long (26m) hold could accommodate 12ft by 12ft square loads. It was loaded via a rear "beaver tail" ramp, allowing it to carry heavy vehicles like Chieftain tanks, missiles, or large quantities of palletized freight. The aircraft featured a removable upper floor, allowing for a two-deck setup to carry up to 250 troops or to maximize floor space for cargo.
- January 20 – Beechcraft King Air
- March 3 – Sud-Aviation Super Caravelle
- April 9 – de Havilland Canada DHC-5 Buffalo
- April 20 – Lockheed L-100 Hercules freighter civilian variant of the C-130 Hercules military transport aircraft
- September 30 – Piper PA-31 Navajo
- October 2 – Piaggio P.166C
- October 14 – Sikorsky YCH-53
- October 19 – Agusta A.101
- November 18 – C-2 Greyhound

=== 1965 ===
- February 25 – Douglas DC-9
- February 27 – Antonov An-22 (NATO reporting name "Cock")
- April 13 – Swearingen Merlin
- April 15 – Aérospatiale Puma prototype SA.330
- May 20 – De Havilland Canada DHC-6 Twin Otter
- June 13 – Britten-Norman Islander
- August 25 – Prototype of Cessna 401 and 402
- August 31 – Aero Spacelines Super Guppy
- October 14 – Cessna 421 Golden Eagle

=== 1966 ===
- January 27 – Fairchild FH-227
- Antonov An-12 "Cub" (civil version) with Aeroflot
- February 23 – Dornier Do 28D Skyservant

=== 1967 ===
- March 3 – Beriev Be-30 (NATO reporting name "Cuff")
- April 9 - Boeing 737

=== 1968 ===
- June 30 – Lockheed C-5 Galaxy
- October 4 – Tupolev Tu-154
- October 26 – Embraer EMB 110 Bandeirante

=== 1969 ===
- February 9 – Boeing 747
- April - Bell UH-1N Iroquois "Twin Huey"
- April 16 – Let L-410 Turbolet
- August 25 – Fairchild Swearingen Metroliner
- September - Antonov An-14M, prototype of the Antonov An-28 ("Cash")

== Accidents and incidents ==
This decade, the following air cargo or airmail related accidents and incidents took place:

== Context ==
The air cargo and airmail events of this decade took place within the following historical context:

- 1960s
  - 1955-1975 – Vietnam War
- 1960
  - June 30 – Independence of Congo
- 1960 in aviation
- 1961
- 1961 in aviation
- 1962
- 1962 in aviation
- 1963
- 1963 in aviation
- 1964
- 1964 in aviation
- 1965
- 1965 in aviation
- 1966
- 1966 in aviation
- 1967
- 1967 in aviation
- 1968
- 1968 in aviation
- 1969
- 1969 in aviation

== Pictures from the decade ==
air cargo and airmail in the decade 1960-1969

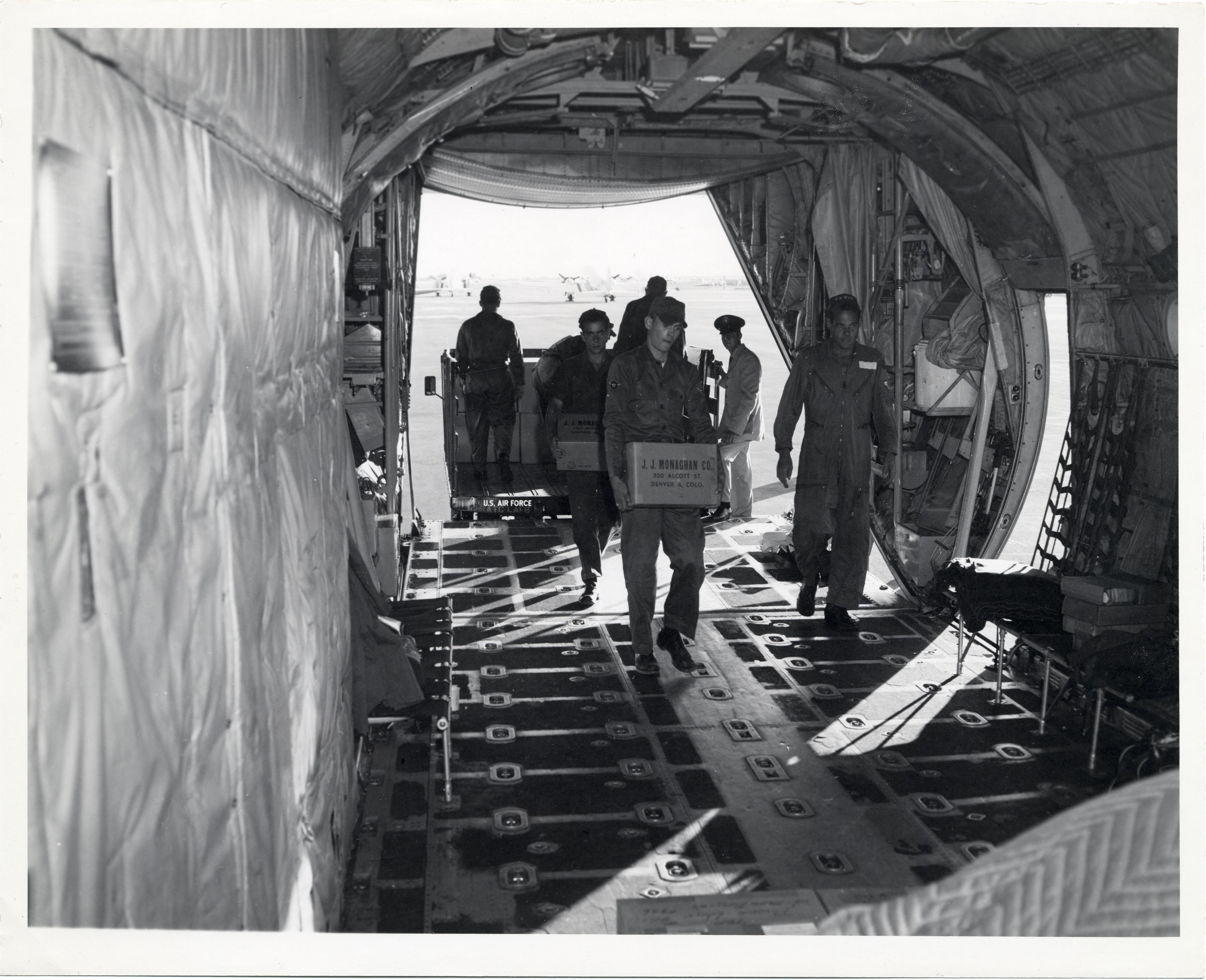
Unidentified members of the U.S. Air Force load cargo onto an aircraft, between 1960 and 1968.

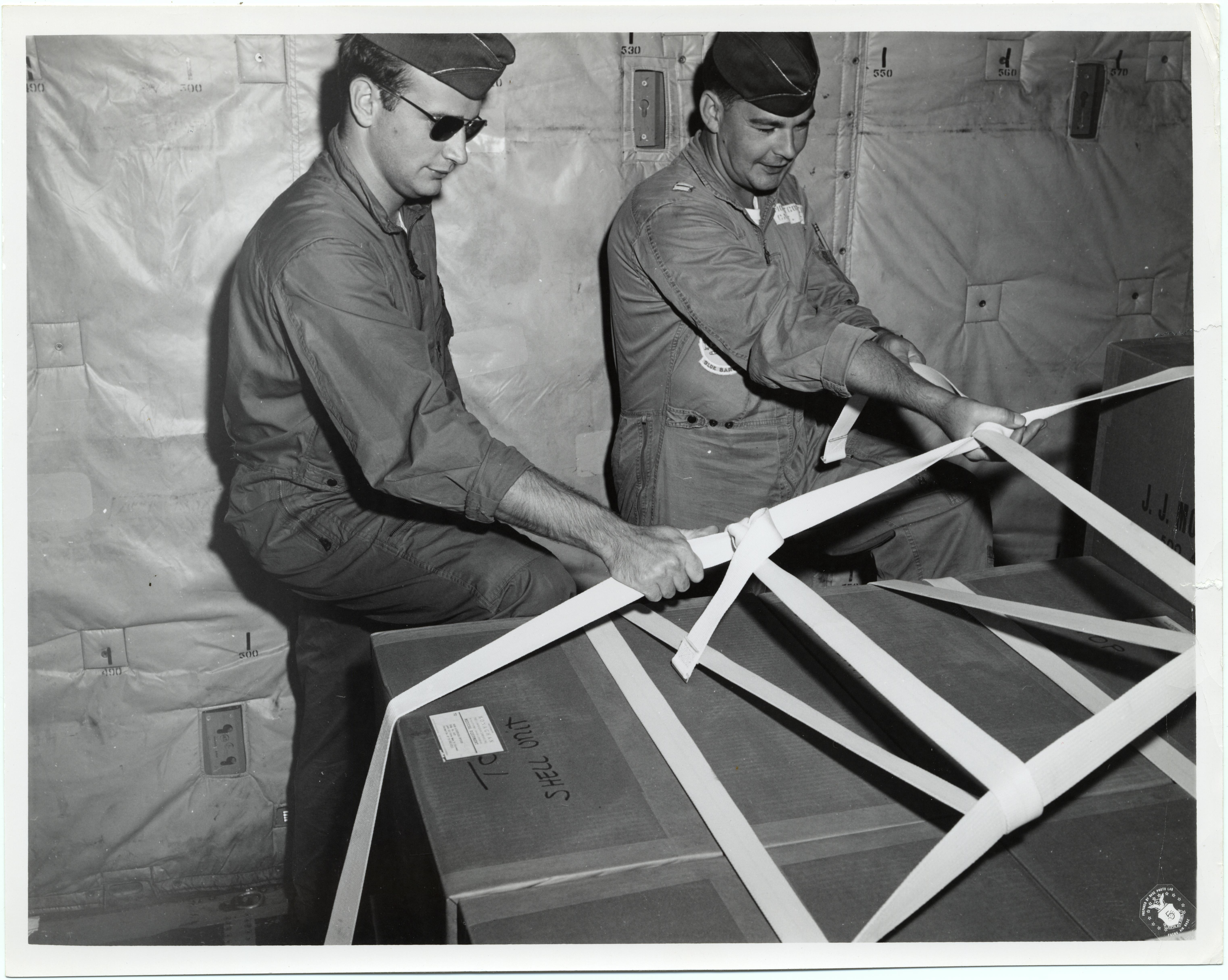
Two unidentified members of the U.S. Air Force inspect cargo inside an aircraft, between 1960 and 1968.

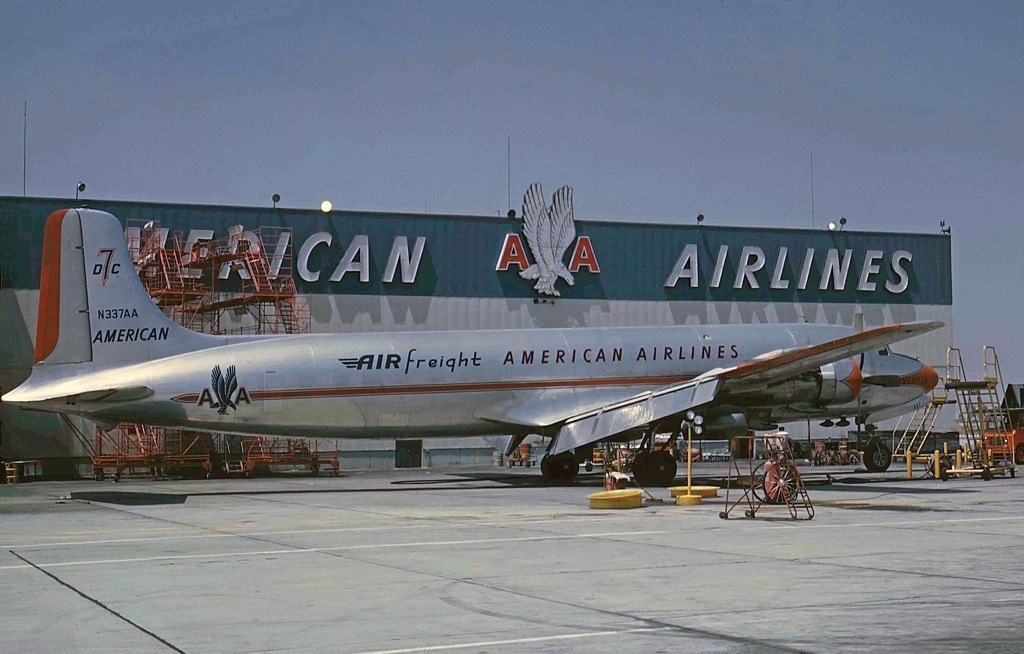
Douglas DC-7B freighter, American Airlines, at LAX, July 1, 1962 (Jon Proctor)

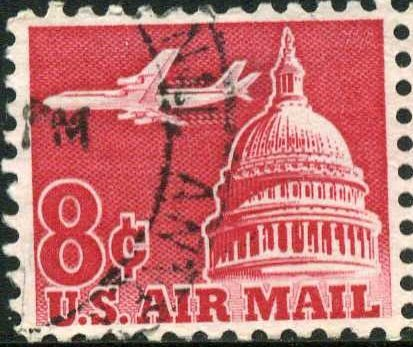
United States 1963 Sn C64a stamp with all-over tagged. (Airmail. Capitol, Washington. Douglas DC-8.) August 1, 1963.

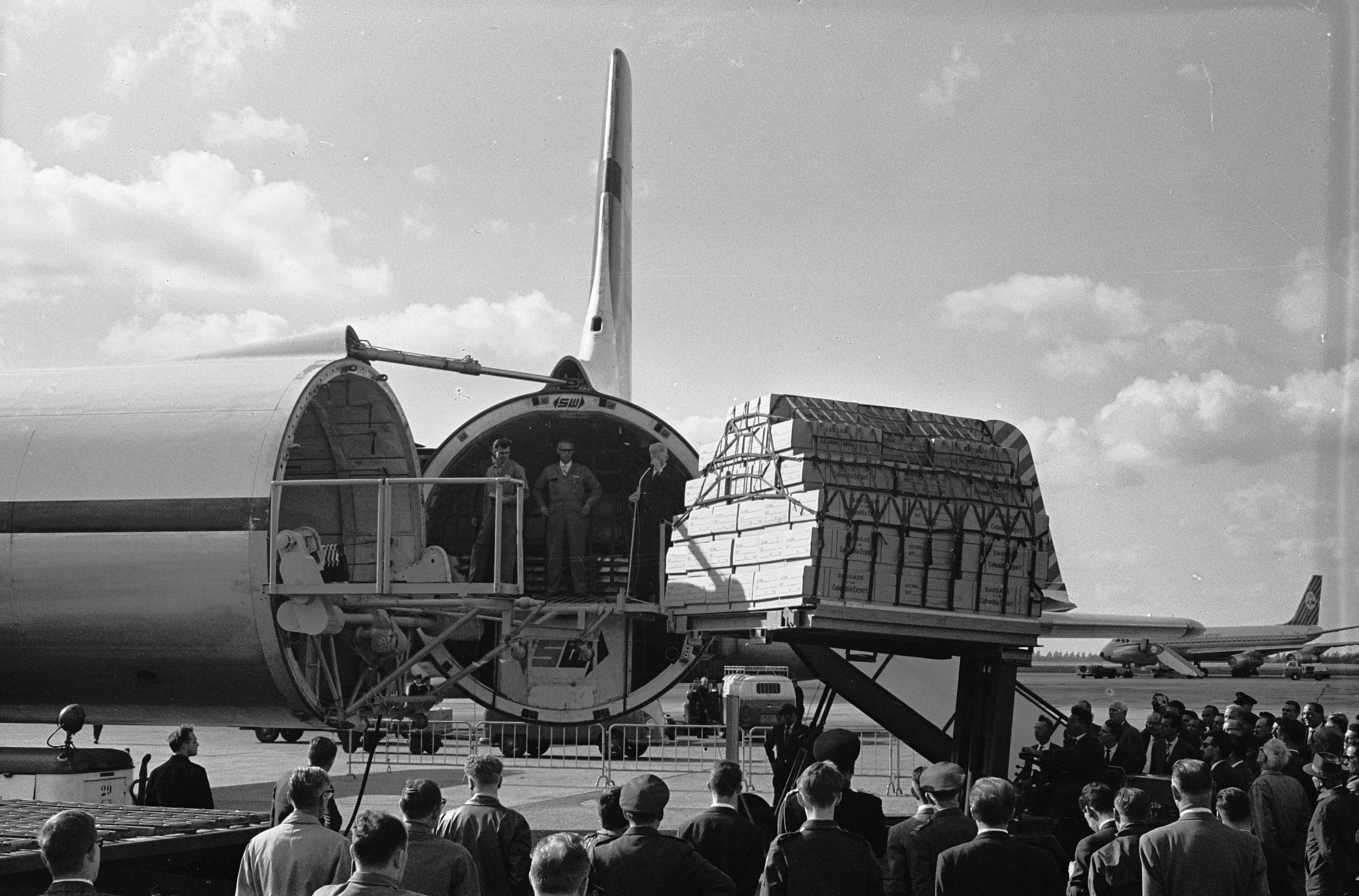
Seaboard World Airlines "Spacecraft", September 4, 1963.

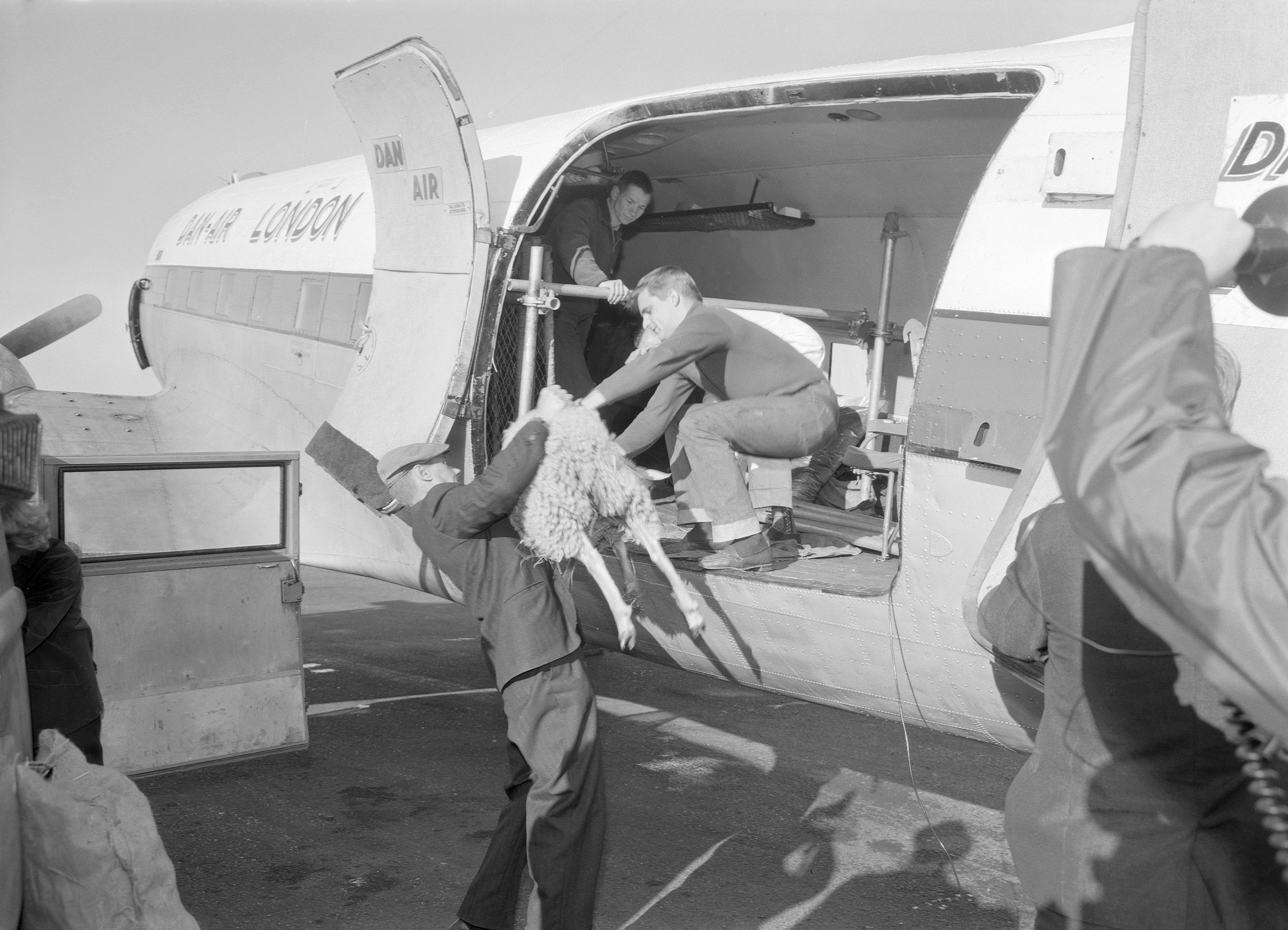
Sheep exported to England by Dan Air plane, September 4, 1964.

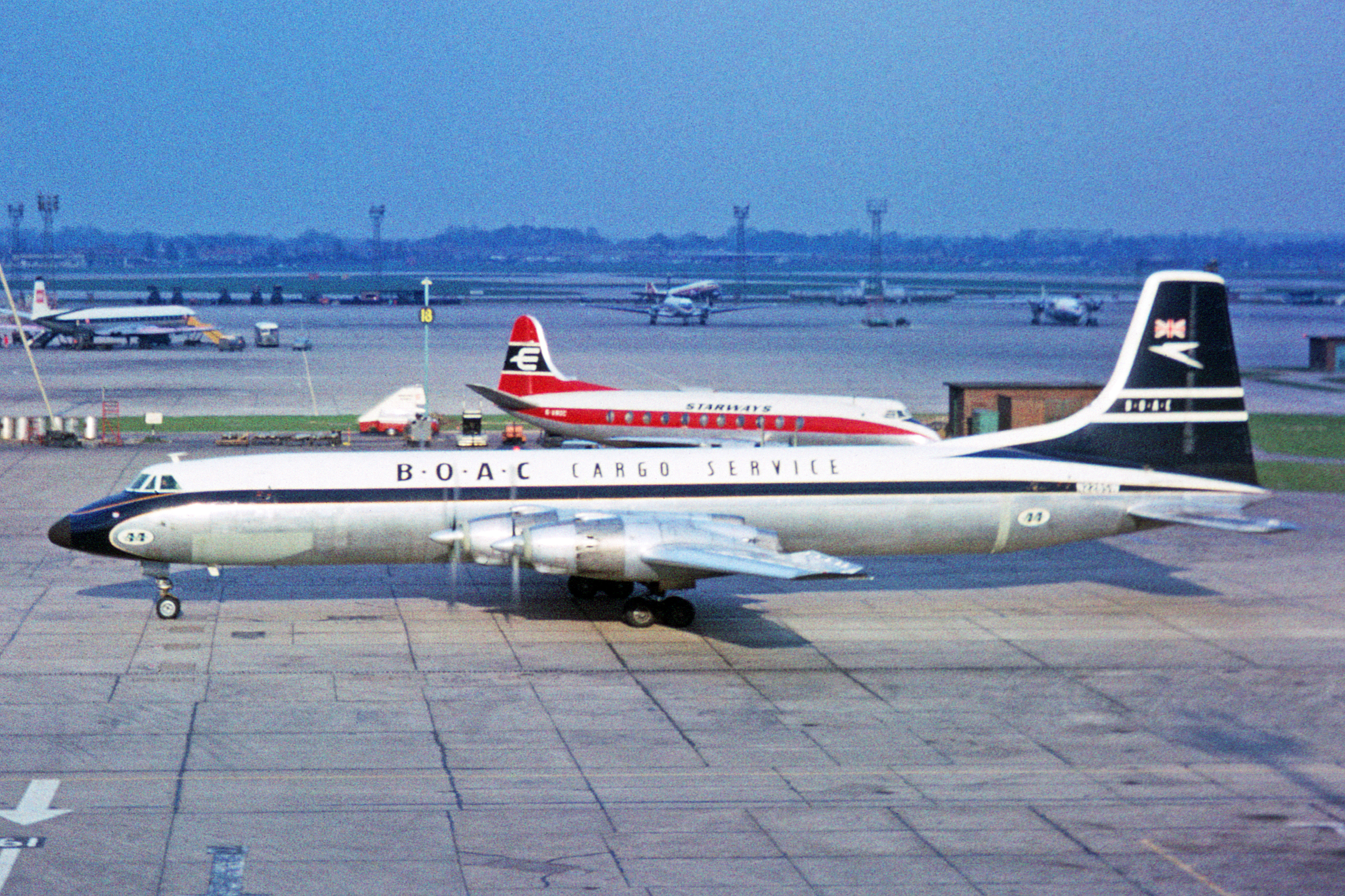
BOAC Cargo - Seaboard World CL-44-D4 N228SW at LHR March 6, 1964.

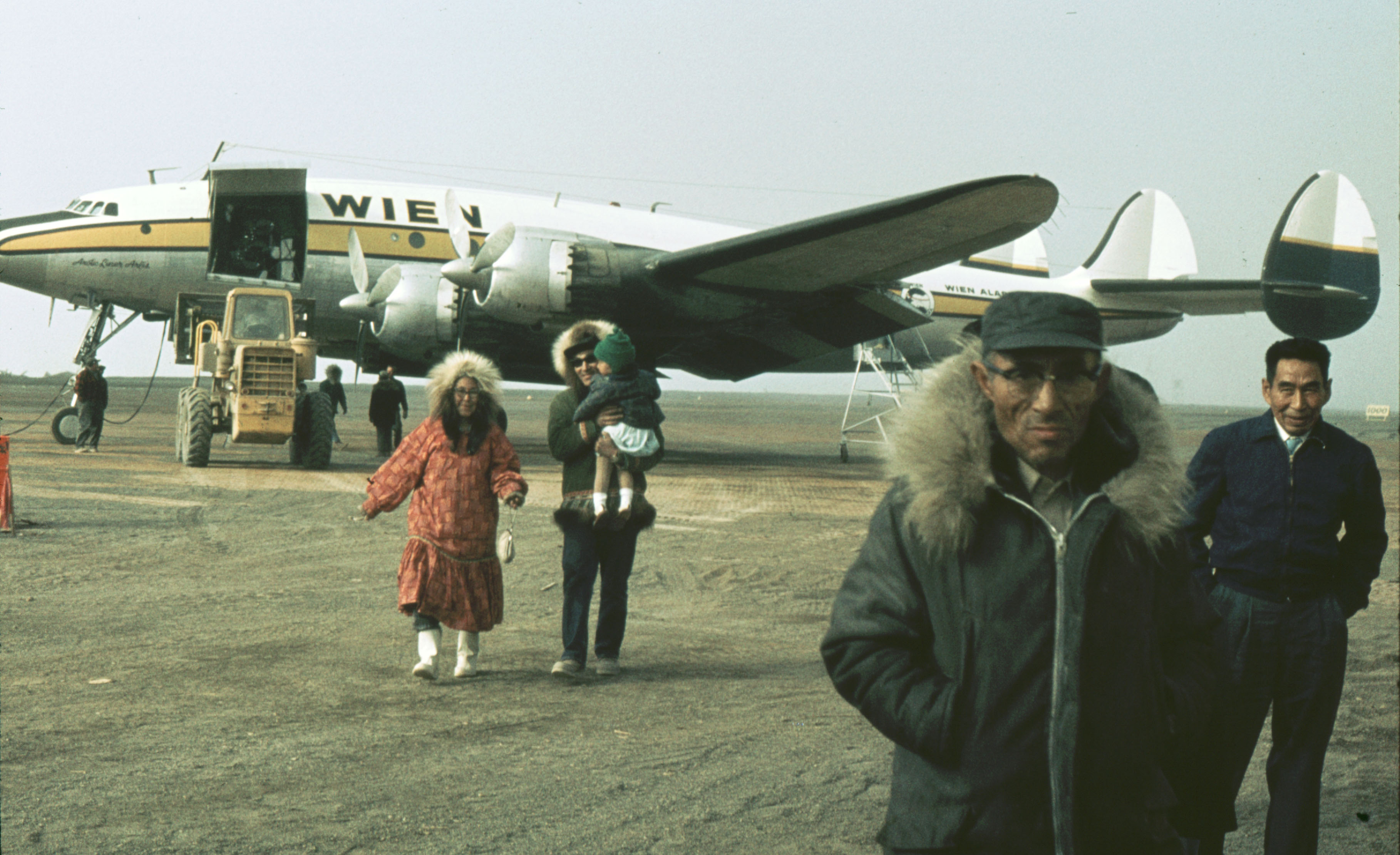
Iñupiat people at Barrow Airport, in front of a Wien Alaska Airlines Constellation, between 1964 and 1968.

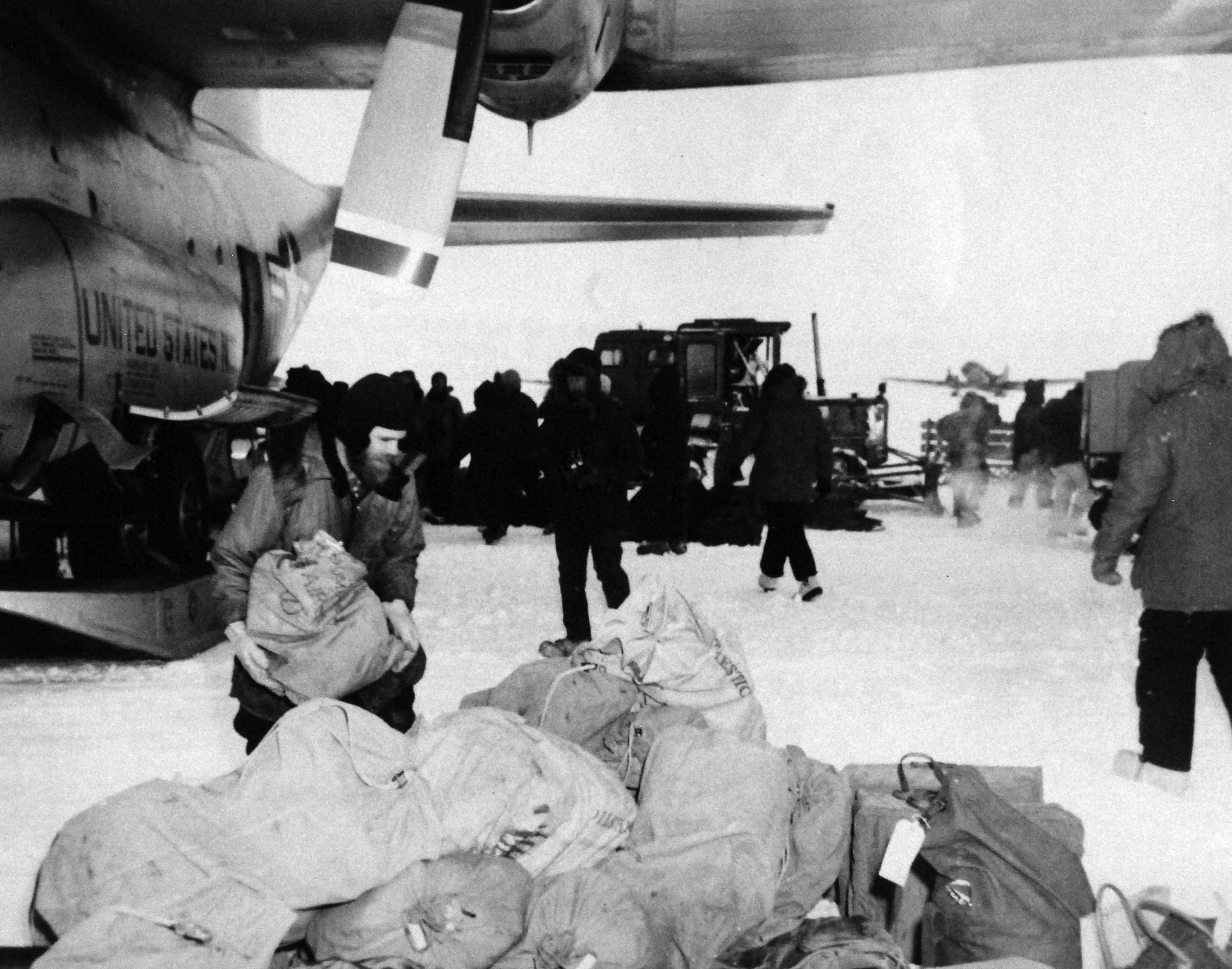
330-PSA-226-64 (USN 826531): The first mail load of Operation Deep Freeze 1965 is unloaded from ski-equipped C-130 which landed at Williams Field near McMurdo after a non-stop flight from Melbourne, Australia. Photograph released October 15, 1964. Master caption: Operation Deep Freeze 1965 was officially opened September 30, 1964, when a C-130 Hercules left Avalon airstrip near Melbourne, Australia, for a non-stop flight to McMurdo Station. The ski-equipped cargo plane, with Rear Admiral James R. Reedy, Commander, U.S. Naval Forces Antarctica, onboard, was piloted by Commander F.S. Gallup, Commander Air Development Squadron Six.

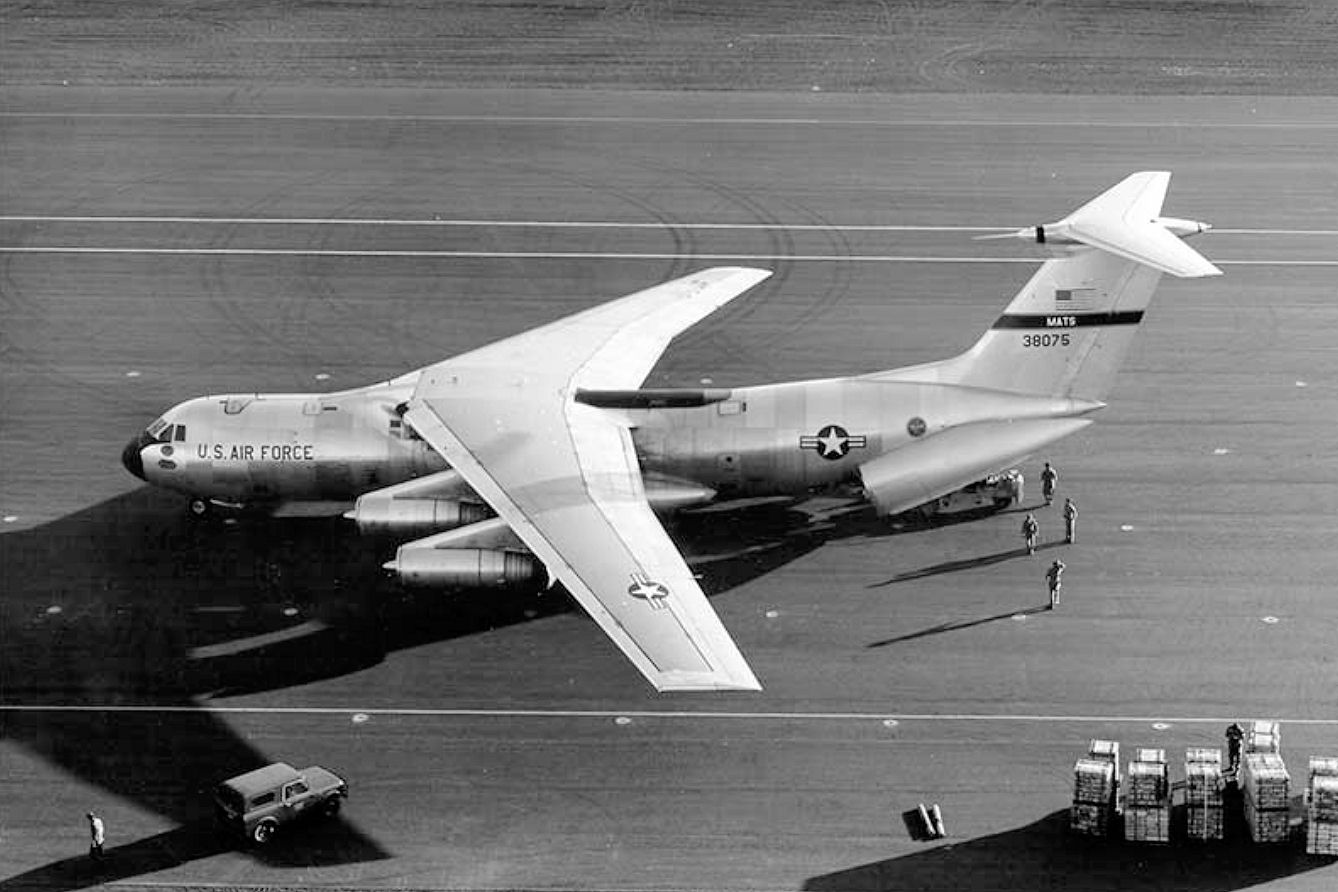
Lockheed C-141A-10-LM Starlifter 63-8075 off-loading in Saigon, July 1966.

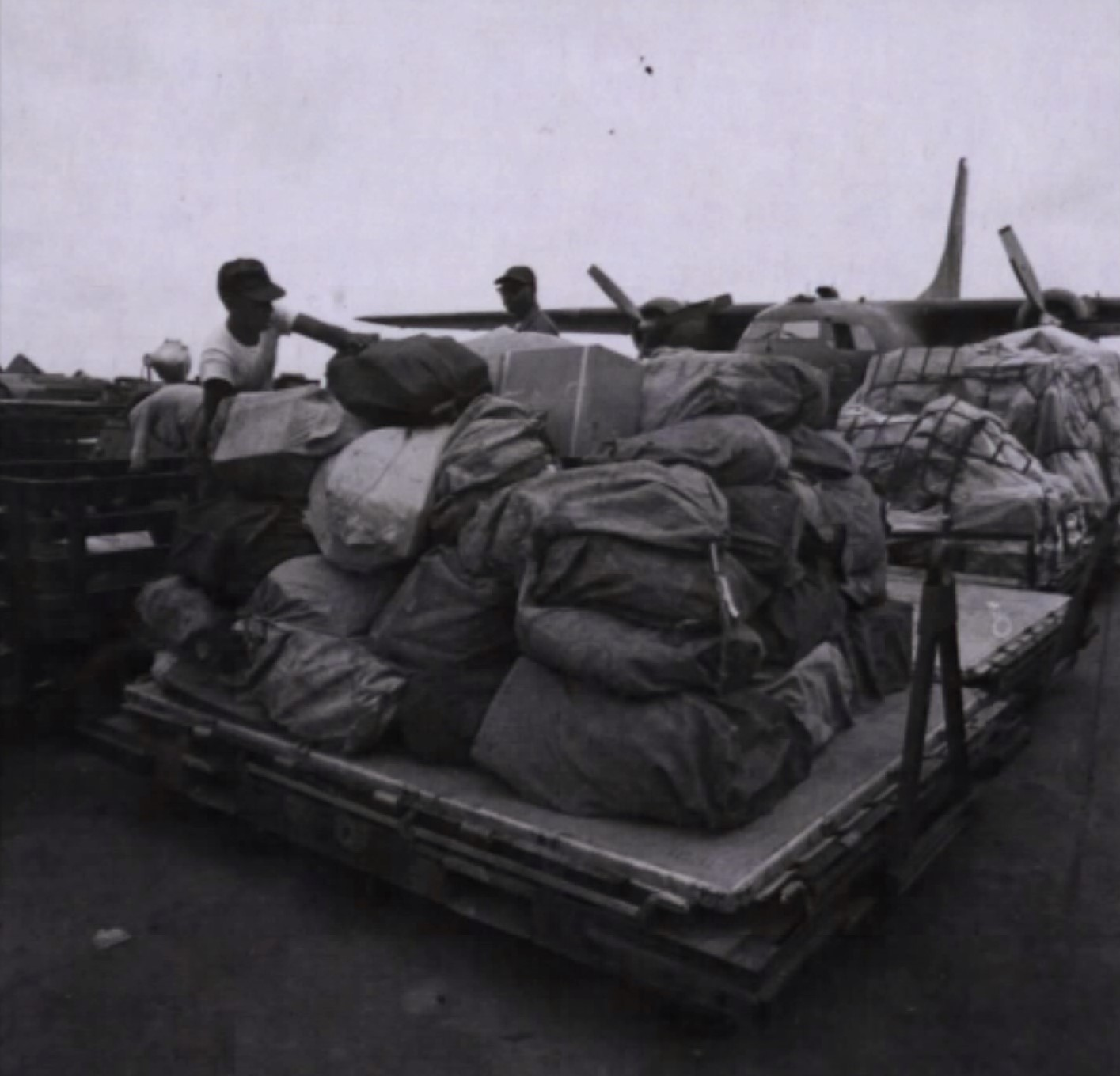
Vietnamese personnel work for US by preparing pallets with mail to be shipped to outlying areas. Aerial resupply by the Army and Air Force fixed wing aircraft and helicopters utilize various methods such as paradrops, LOLEX (Low Level Extractions), and air landings of cargo by various types of aircraft such as C-123, C-130, CV-2 Caribou, CH-54 Flying Crane, CH-47 Chinook, and UH-1D Hueys.

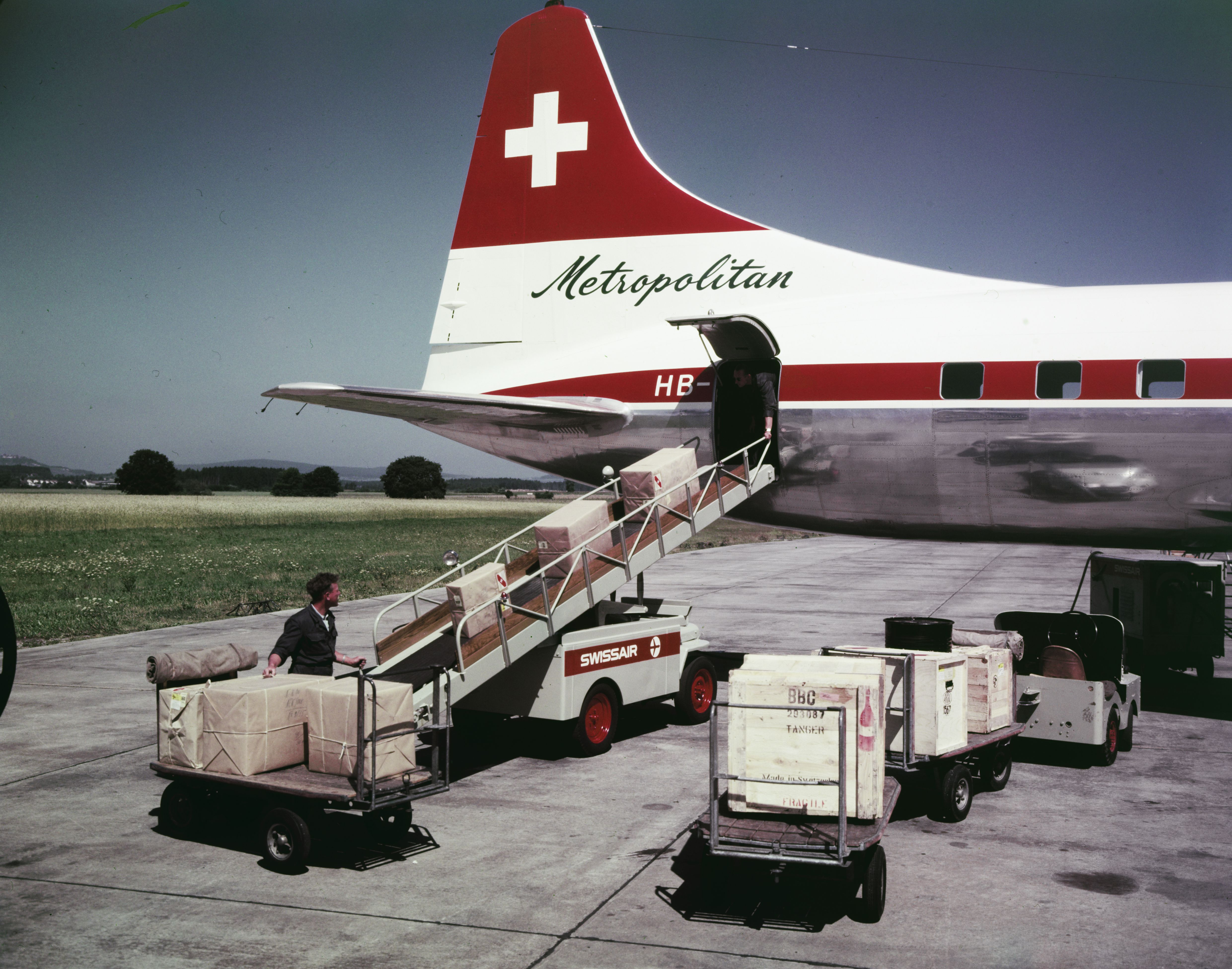
Loading cargo in a Swissair Convair CV-440-11 Metropolitan in Zürich-Kloten airport, January 1, 1967.

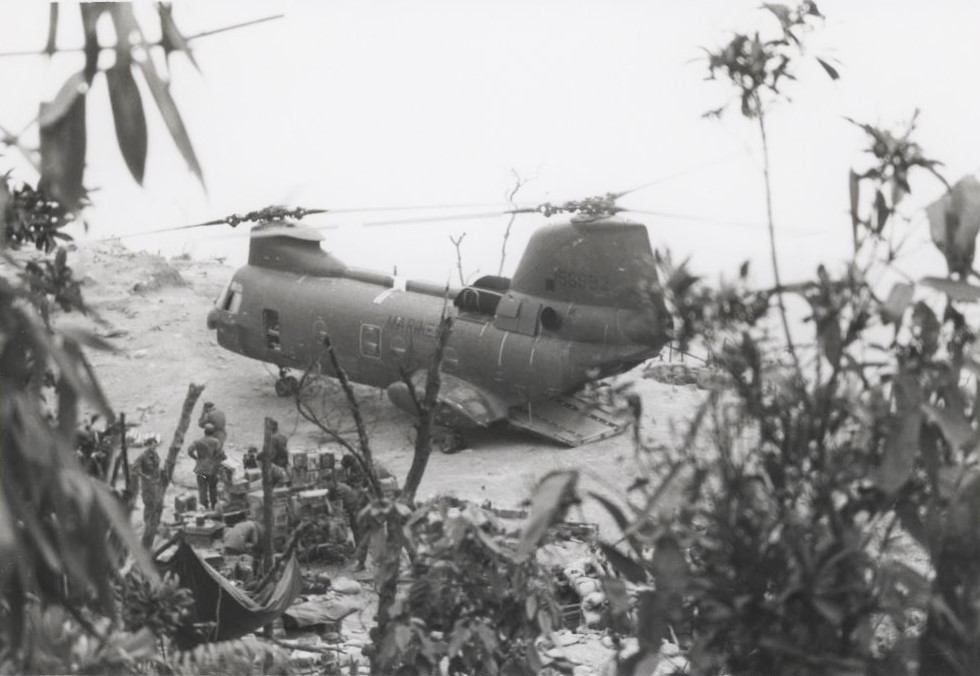
CH-46 transport helicopter resupplies Company F, 2.4 Marines south of Camp Evans (Vietnam), February 10, 1968.

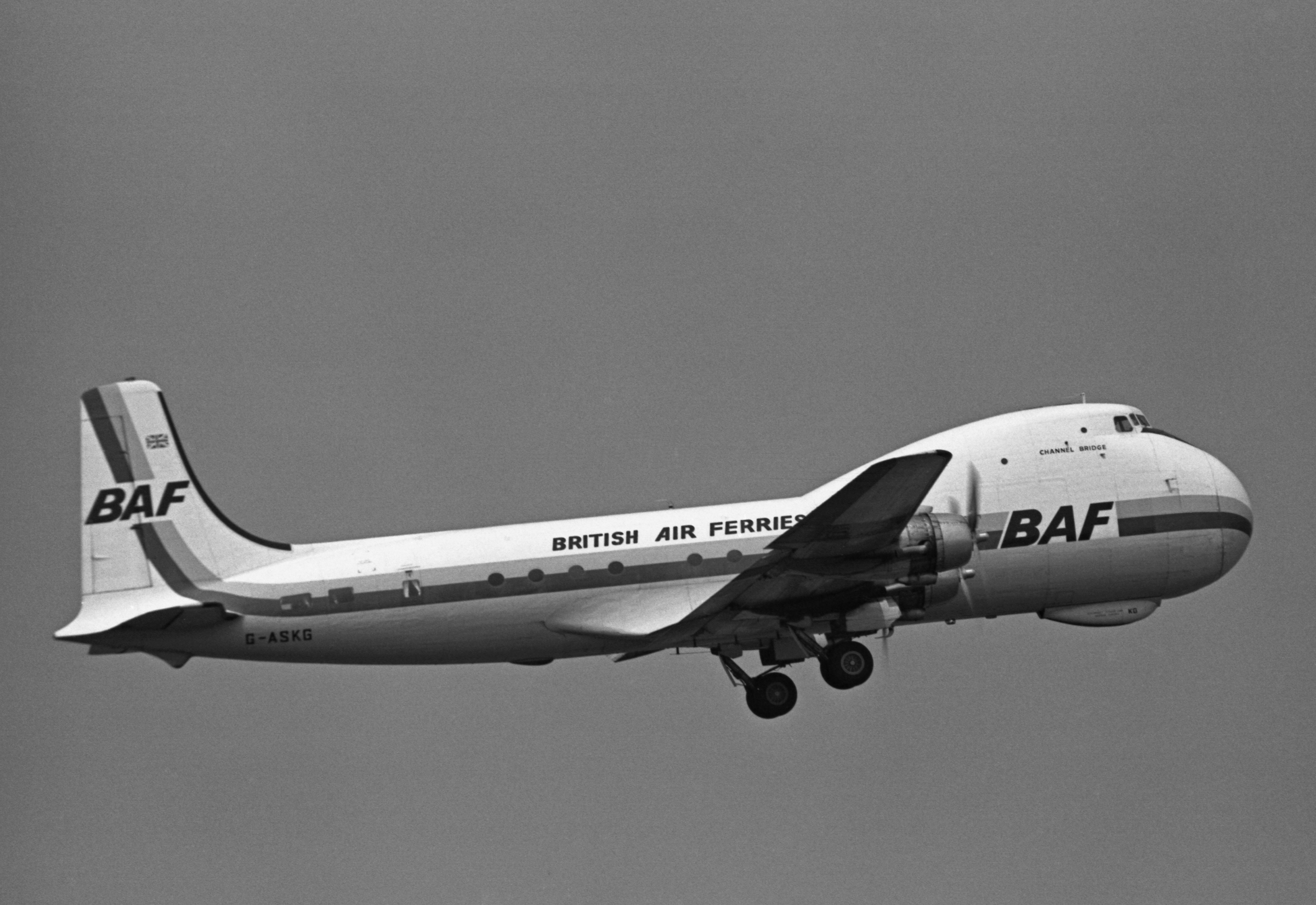
ATL 98 Carvair G-ASKG, British Air Ferries, Southend, UK, May 24, 1968.

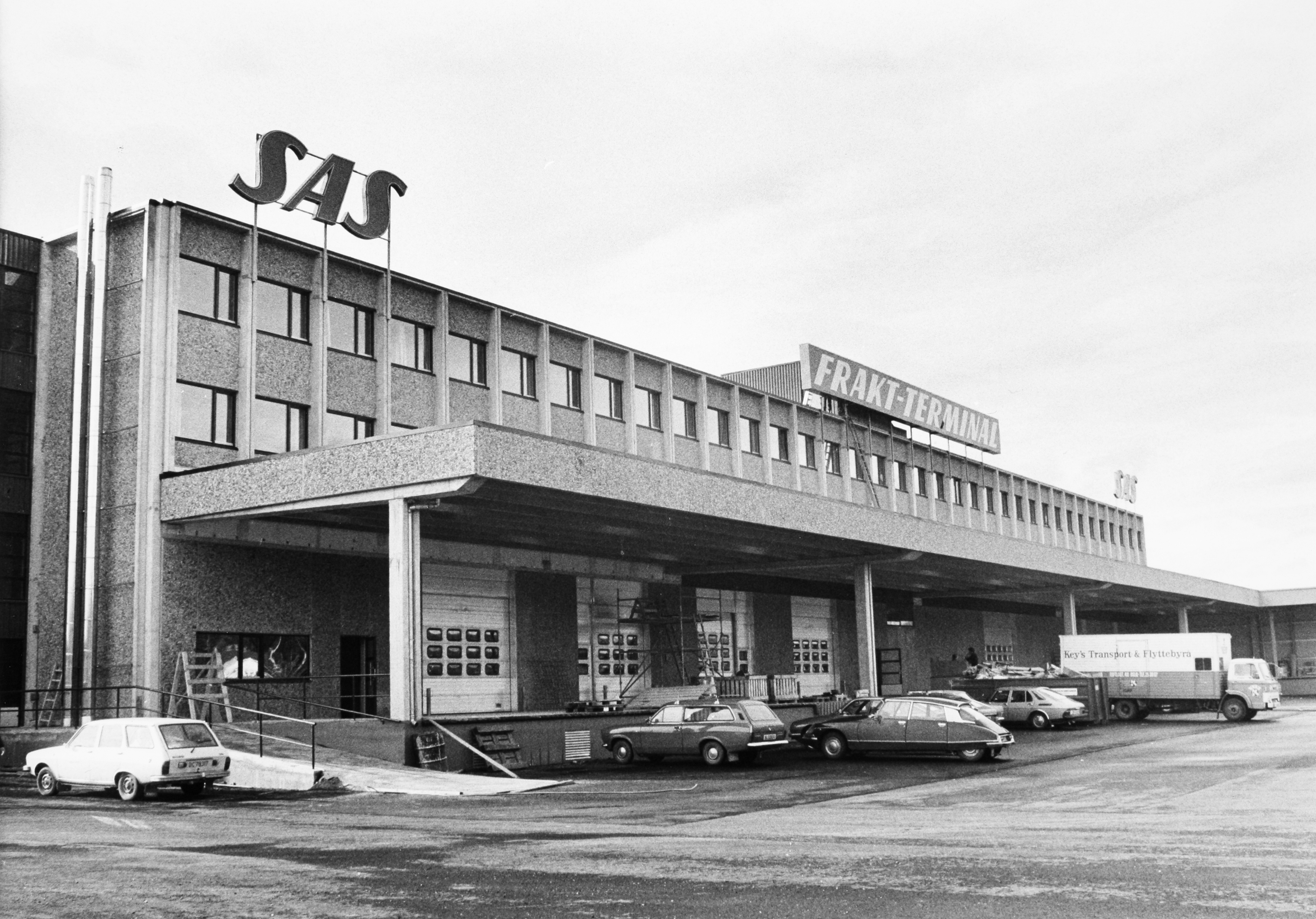
Fornebu International Airport, FBU, Oslo. Cargo Terminal SAS Scandinavian Airlines, 1960s.

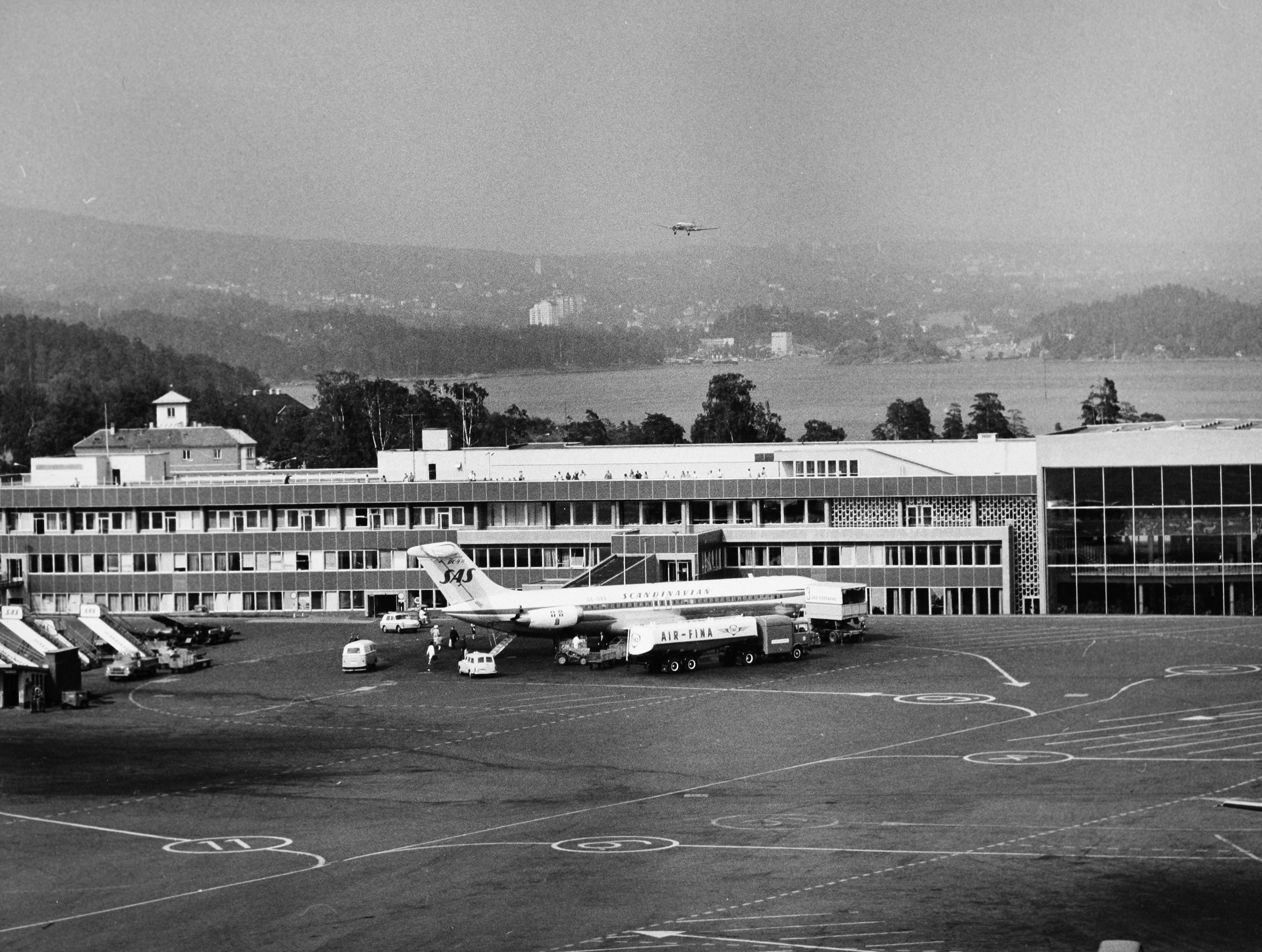
Fornebu International Airport, FBU, Oslo. exterior of cargo terminal, 1960s.

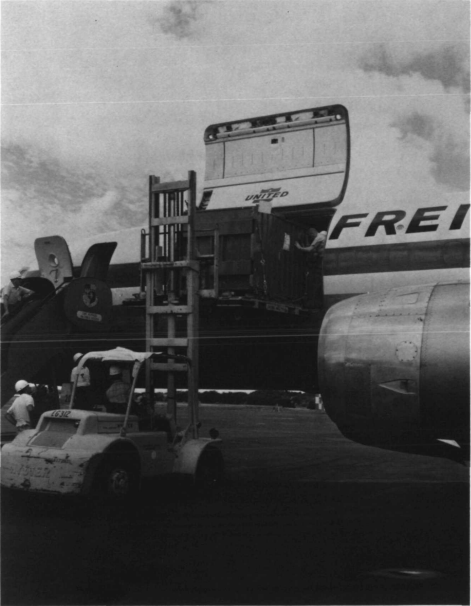
Pioneer E space weather probe arriving at Cape Kennedy by air-freight from the West Coast, July 18, 1969.

== See also ==
- Timeline of Air Cargo
- 1910s in air cargo
- 1920s in air cargo
- 1930s in air cargo
- 1940s in air cargo
- 1950s in air cargo
