= Bellande =

Bellande is a surname. Notable people with the surname include:

- Edward Antoine Bellande (1897–1976), American aviation and aeronautics pioneer
- Jean-Robert Bellande (born 1970), American poker player, reality TV contestant, and nightclub owner and promoter
