= Grover Clinton Tyler =

American pilot (1892–1966)

- Grover Tyler wearing the ribbon bar to the newly received Airmail Flyers Medal of Honor above his pilot wings.
- Born: October 11, 1889; Knox County, Nebraska, U.S.
- Died: October 6, 1966 (aged 76); Seattle, Washington, U.S.
- Occupation: Aviator
- Awards: Airmail Flyers' Medal of Honor

Signature
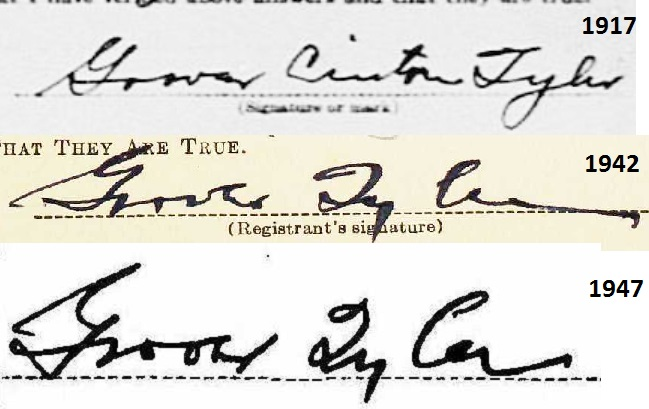

Grover Clinton Tyler (October 11, 1892 – October 2, 1966) was an American aeronautical pioneer who flew as an airmail pilot in the 1920s and 1930s, and was one of only ten recipients of the Airmail Flyers' Medal of Honor.

== Career ==
Tyler is one of two pilots that started service with the Pacific Air Transport in 1926 flying along the west coast between Canada and Mexico. He is credited with flying the last leg, from Portland to Seattle, Washington, of a historic five-leg trip between Los Angeles, California, and Seattle, establishing the flight of the Pacific Coast Airways. Landing his biplane at Gorst Field, he handed over the first sack of mail on this new commercial route to Postmaster C. M. Perkins on 15 September 1926. To prepare the route for night flying Tyler and fellow pilot Arthur Starbuck, the other original pilot staff of PAT, drove an old Ford up and down the San Joaquin Valley setting up airway beacon lights with a pick and shovel. By 1928 the PAT had become a unit of Boeing Systems and Tyler continued flying the mail as well as passengers on this new route he had helped to establish.

=== Flight incident ===
On the night of March 2, 1931, while flying along the very route he had helped establish, a fire broke out on board his aircraft, a Boeing 40-B-4, and Tyler had to make an emergency landing near Roseburg, Oregon. For his actions that night President Franklin Delano Roosevelt on 29 October 1935 presented Tyler, along with 6 other pilots, with the Airmail Flyers' Medal of Honor. This very deed was later chronicled on the well known "Wheaties" cereal box as part of a 1930s era series regarding the Air Mail Flyers Medal of Honor recipients.

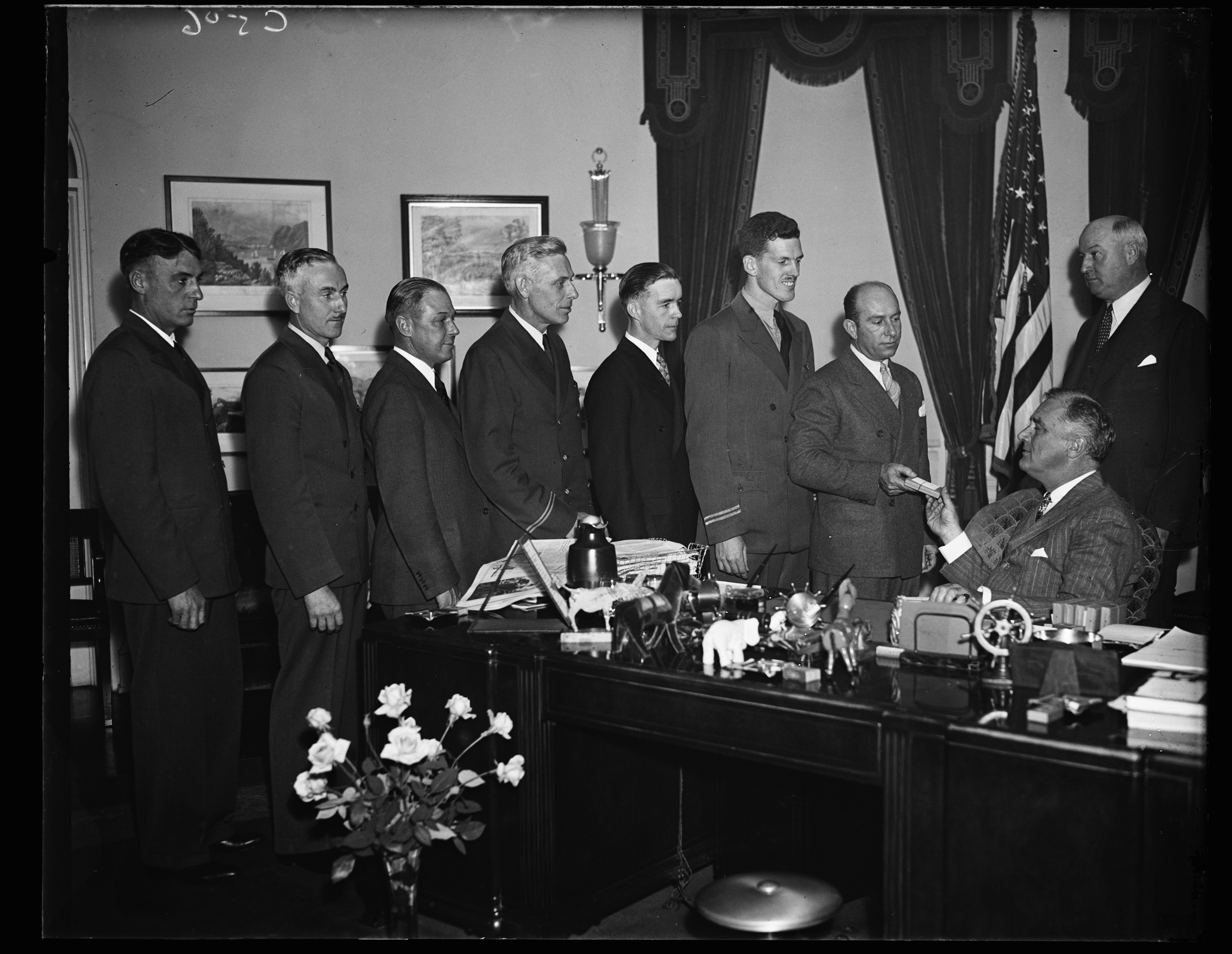
Roosevelt awards the Airmail Flyers Medal of Honor to 7 pilots, with Tyler being the second from the left in the photo.

== Medal from the President ==
29 October 1935 at a ceremony (12:00 - 12:15) in the White House Tyler was one of seven aviators awarded the Airmail Flyers’ Medal of Honor by president Franklin Delano Roosevelt for extraordinary achievement. All seven of the pilots saved the mail in hazardous landings.

Present at the ceremony were: President, Franklin Delano Roosevelt; Postmaster General, James A Farley; Lewis S Turner of Fort Worth, Texas; James H Carmichael, Jr. of Detroit, Michigan; Edward A Bellande of Los Angeles, California; Gordon S Darnell of Kansas City, Missouri; Willington P McFail of Murfreesboro, Tennessee; Roy H Warner of Portland, Oregon; And Grover Tyler of Seattle, Washington. Bellande's deed was chronicled on the well known Wheaties cereal box cover as part of a series of 8 box covers regarding the feats of pilots awarded the Air Mail Flyers Medal of Honor.

=== Medal citation ===
For extraordinary achievement while piloting air mail plane No. C-741 on the night of March 2, 1931, on a flight from Seattle, Wash. To San Diego, Calif. when about nine miles south of Glide, Oregon, about 11 p.m., Pilot Tyler discovered that smoke was coming from the underside of the plane in the vicinity of the mail compartment. The smoke was almost immediately followed by flames. The plane at the time was over a mountainous region and the nearest clearing the pilot remembered was in the vicinity of Glide. He returned to it and landed the plane in a clump of small pliant trees. The wings were caught by the trees and were torn from the body of the plane. This served to break the force of the landing so that the passengers were not seriously injured. One passenger received a few cuts about the face and another burned his hands slightly in handling a hot fire extinguisher. Pilot Tyler helped the passengers from the plane and with their assistance removed the mall load of 319 pounds from the plane. The burning pouches were thrown into the swampy ground which extinguished the fire and saved the mail except for charred edges and water damage. The fire in the mail compartment of the plane was then quenched with fire extinguishers and the water in the swampy area in which the plane landed.

== Death ==
Tyler died in 1966 just months after attending the dedication of a fountain at 5500 W. Marginal Way S. W. in Portland, Oregon marking the location of his historic landing 40 years earlier.
