= Gordon Darnell =

American aviator

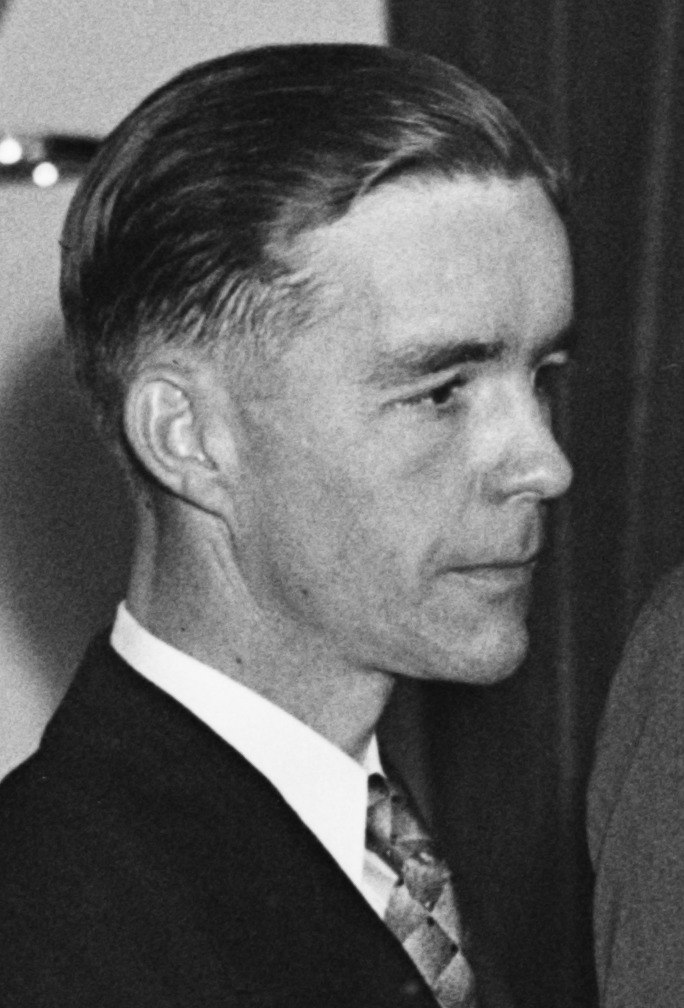
- Darnell in 1934
- Born: Gordon Sprigg Darnell; October 7, 1905; Little Rock, Arkansas, U.S.
- Died: November 21, 1997; Denton, Texas, U.S.
- Occupation: Aviator
- Spouse(s): Elsie Marie Pyle (1929); Florence Lorene Carpenter Dunn (1989)
- Children: Donna Marie (1932); Gordon James (1934)
- Awards: Airmail Flyers' Medal of Honor (1933)

Gordon Sprigg Darnell (October 7, 1905 – November 21, 1997) was an American auto mechanic, airplane mechanic, Army officer, Army pilot, airmail pilot, airline pilot, volunteer fireman and one of ten recipients of the Airmail Flyers' Medal of Honor.

== Childhood and education ==
Gordon Sprigg Darnell was born on 7 October 1905 in Little Rock, Arkansas, the second of six children born to Roscoe "Ross" Wesley Darnell of Maywood, Indiana (now a suburb of Indianapolis) and Clara May Sprigg of Searcy, Arkansas.

His siblings were Roscoe Eugene (1904–1906), Kathryn (1907–1997), Cecil (1911–2001), Willis Mack (1913–1935), and Glenn (1921–2009).

Darnell spent his childhood in Little Rock, Arkansas. Most of his early days were spent along with the other local kids hanging out at Edgar E Elliott's Garage repair shop near his home. He was one of the more talented kids, according to Elliott, for whom he began working. Little did either of them know this was the beginning of a path that would lead to his career in aviation. One of the other notable children that hung around the garage was Dick Powell. Darnell also spent some time driving a traveling salesman around the area.

He received training in the vocational department of Little Rock High School, graduating in 1922 as a certified automobile mechanic. He received his high school diploma from Morris Preparatory School, Little Rock College in July 1926. Darnell was almost 21 at the time, which aroused questions when he began his flying career.

== Military ==
With his new status as a certified automobile mechanic, and permission from his parents due to being a juvenile, in 1922 Darnell went to work for the Arkansas National Guard as a driver and mechanic. He worked on the Guard unit's staff car, which was a hand-me-down Cadillac left over from World War I. Darnell also participated in weekly drills and summer camp with the Guard.

On 24 October 1925, Darnell was promoted to the rank of Technical Sergeant (Tech Sgt.), the same day the 154th Aero Squadron was reformed as the 154th Observation. In November 1925 Tech Sgt Darnell was taken for his first airplane ride by one of the pilots. He later qualified as an aircraft mechanic. Darnell went through the Air Corps Primary Flying School from 1 March 1927 to 5 August 1927, Brooks Field, San Antonio, Texas. He then attended Air Corps Advanced Flying School from September 1927 to 4 February 1928 (Pursuit), Kelly Field, San Antonio, Texas.

On 9 February 1928 Major Curtis R Barham, QMC, wrote a letter which recommended Lieutenant Darnell of the Air Corps Reserve, a commission in the 154th Observation Squadron.

=== Upside down AT-4 ===
While flying with the 43rd School Squadron Darnell was lucky to escape serious injury on 1 February 1928 when his Curtiss AT-4 trainer on landing came to rest with its undercarriage pointing skyward and one broken wheel. He might have been shaken but Darnell was not held at fault and graduated from Primary Flying School just three days later.

=== Making contacts ===
On 21 August 1928 the Little Rock Chamber of Commerce appointed Lt. Darnell as a member of the Fields Directions, Information and Itinerary Committee for the Arkansas Air Tour to promote aviation across the state. He also did his first work for Paul R Braniff, Inc, and Braniff took notice of the young pilot. In September 1928 Darnell spent two weeks working for his new friend, Braniff, flying between Oklahoma City and Tulsa.

=== Another close call ===
On 21 April 1929 Lt. Darnell, flying in a 154th Observation Squadron Army plane out of Little Rock, was landing at the Municipal Airport in Fort Worth when his plane was struck by another aircraft. Henry Woods was piloting the other aircraft and preparing for takeoff when the two planes collided. Both planes were damaged but no one was hurt.

== Career in aviation ==
=== Cromwell Airlines ===
In May 1929 Texas oil driller Carl G. Cromwell hired Darnell as his personal pilot, flying a Lockheed Vega. Later, when Cromwell started his own airline in San Angelo, Texas, Darnell became his chief pilot and later the operator and manager. To man the new airline Darnell hired Jimmie Mattern and James Walker as pilots. Darnell bought two Stinson SM-6B Detroiters as the new fleet aircraft and used the existing Vega as a backup aircraft. The inaugural flight took off at 8am on 1 November. On 10 November while flying one of the new Stinson planes from Detroit Michigan, Darnell stopped at the Curtiss-Wright headquarters at Stout Field while on his way to San Angelo.

==== A setback ====
Cromwell had a setback on 7 December 1929 when Hangar No. 1 at Dallas Love Field burned down. The hangar belonged to Good and Foster Aero Service Company, who leased space to both private operators and transport companies. Most of the hangar and 12 aircraft were destroyed, including one of the SM-B6 Detroiters (NC-484H) belonging to Cromwell. By July 1930 Cromwell Airlines had folded.

=== Lea-Mex Development Co ===
Darnell flew the remaining Detroiter (NC-407M) aircraft to Oklahoma City in order to sell it to Oklahoma businessman John J Harden and his Lea-Mex Development Company working in New Hobbs, New Mexico. The development company of Lea County, New Mexico was involved in the newly incorporated Hobbs. Harden ended up hiring the newly unemployed Darnell as their pilot. Darnell worked for them for about a year.

=== United States Airways ===
After the death of his good friend and former employer, Cromwell, in 1931 Darnell moved his family to Denver, Colorado. He began working for United States Airways, Inc. (USA Inc.), making regular flights between Denver and Kansas City, Missouri.

==== Emergency landing ====
Darnell was on a routine flight from Kansas City to Denver on 28 June 1933 when there was a flight incident, forcing him to land the aircraft in a field of young corn near Goodland, Kansas. Darnell was able to get the four passengers out uninjured and the mail undamaged. The passengers aboard the plane were R. I. Olsen of Salina, Kansas, Miss Helen Fling of Kansas City, Mrs. L. V. Sams of Denver, and Robert Barr of Chicago, who continued into Denver by motor car. The flight had just left a stop in Salina where passenger Henry A Wallace, the Secretary of Agriculture from Kansas City, had disembarked. Not long after the incident, Darnell left USA Inc.

=== Braniff ===
In the wake of the Air Mail scandal and the cancellation of all government airmail contracts, Paul Braniff went to Washington, DC to petition for an airmail route. Braniff was not one of the companies banned from bidding on the new contracts, and in April it was granted one of the airmail contracts. In May 1934 Darnell made the long-term career choice to work for Braniff, after having left the company on four different occasions. He became one of Braniff's first pilots.

In October 1935 Darnell was called to the White House, along with six other aviators, and was presented a medal by President Roosevelt.

In August 1937 Darnell made news again. He, as pilot, and his brother Cecil Darnell as co-pilot, made up the crew on the route between Chicago and Dallas. Both had been working for Braniff for about two years.

The "flying Darnells" gained more notoriety when 17-year-old movie star Linda Darnell (no relation) was traveling with her mother to Mexico City when they stopped in Brownsville to change planes. She commented on "the flying Darnells". Captain Gordon Darnell was the pilot for her flight from Kansas City to Dallas, and Captain Cecil Darnell was the pilot for her flight from Dallas to Brownsville.

In 1959 Darnell celebrated his 25th year with Braniff. He retired as the company's number one pilot in October 1965. He had logged more than 34,000 hours and 8.5 million miles in his career by then. During his career Darnell piloted everything from a Stinson bi-plane to Boeing Jets.

== Flying Darnells ==
The flying Darnells were well known in aviation circles as family members Gordon (pilot for Braniff), his daughter Donna (hostess for Continental), his son Gordon James (co-pilot for Trans-Texas), his brother Glen (co-pilot for Delta), and his brother Cecil (pilot for Braniff). Another brother, Willis Mack, was a pilot cadet who was killed 25 June 1935 in a crash at Selfridge Field, Michigan after graduating from Army Flying School on 20 February 1935 at Kelly Field, Texas.

== Flight incident ==
=== Pilot statement ===
"My name is Gordon Darnell. I am a resident of Kansas City, Missouri, and holder of Transport Pilot's License Number 1875. The total number of hours flown approximately 4265. I am employed as a pilot for the United States Airways, operating on regular schedule run between Kansas City, Missouri and Denver, Colorado.

On June 28, 1933 I departed from the Municipal Airport, Kansas City, Missouri, flying Flamingo NC 9489. Ship was functioning properly throughout the entire trip until I reached the vicinity of Goodland, Kansas. While flying at an altitude of approximately two thousand feet I suddenly discovered fire which seemed to originate around the rear portion of the motor section and which permitted flames and fumes to enter through the floor boards into the pilot's cockpit. I immediately cut the throttle and switch and turned off the right hand gas tank. It was impossible to close the left hand gas tank connection due to the flames around that portion. I attempted to smother the flames in the cockpit by the use of a fire extinguisher. I lowered both windows in the pilot's cockpit and placed the ship in a nose high side slip which partly cleared the fumes and kept most of the flames out of the cockpit. A normal three point landing was made in a corn field approximately three miles east of the Municipal Airport at Goodland, Kansas. I left the ship by the front exit and after having removed the passengers, I then removed the mail and luggage with the exception of a small amount of personal effects contained in the pilot's cockpit. Contained in the luggage compartment there was approximately 124 pounds of express which was removed.

After recounting the accident I firmly believe the fire originated around the motor section caused by gas leak. Shortly following removal of passengers and luggage the right gas tank exploded, throwing gasoline and flames high into the air.

I have read the foregoing statements and certify that they are true and correct to the best of my knowledge.

Gordon S. Darnell"

== Medal from the president ==
On 29 October 1935 at a ceremony in the White House, Darnell was one of seven aviators awarded the Airmail Flyers' Medal of Honor by President Franklin Delano Roosevelt for extraordinary achievement. All seven of the pilots had saved the mail in hazardous landings.

Present at the ceremony were President Franklin Delano Roosevelt; Postmaster General James A Farley; Lewis S. Turner of Fort Worth, Texas; James H. Carmichael, Jr. of Detroit, Michigan; Edward A. Bellande of Los Angeles, California; Gordon S. Darnell of Kansas City, Missouri; Willington P. McFail of Murfreesboro, Tennessee; Roy H. Warner of Portland, Oregon; and Grover Tyler of Seattle, Washington. Darnell's deed was chronicled on the well known Wheaties cereal box cover as part of a series of 8 box covers regarding the feats of pilots awarded the Air Mail Flyers Medal of Honor.

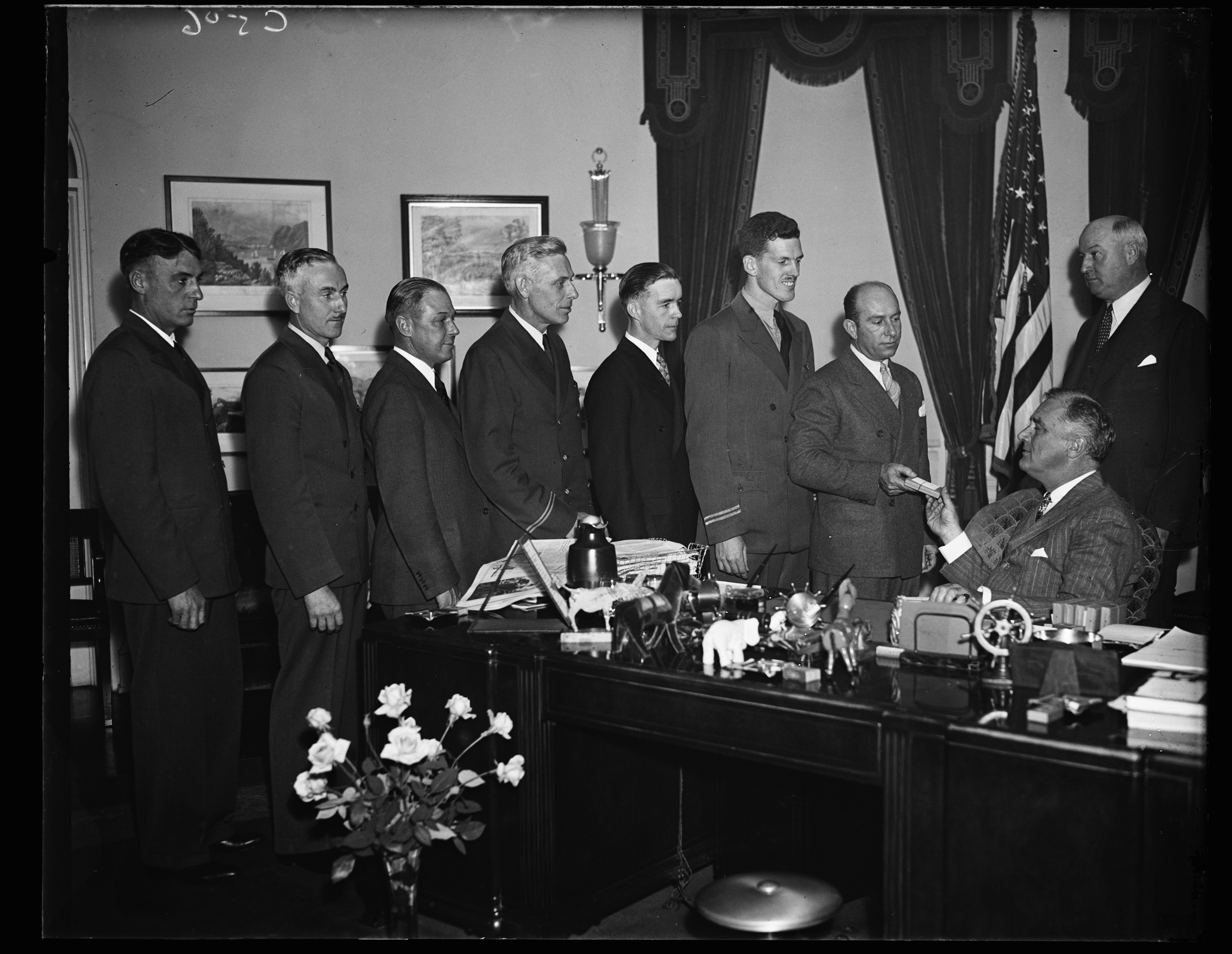
President Roosevelt awards the Airmail Flyers Medal of Honor to seven pilots, with Darnell being the third in line to receive the medal.

=== Medal citation ===
For extraordinary achievement while piloting air mail plane No. NC 9489 on a flight from Kansas City, Mo. to Denver, Colo., on June 28, 1933. Near Goodland, Kansas, at an altitude of about 2,000 feet, Pilot Darnell smelled gasoline fumes. Fire followed immediately, breaking through the lower left side of the cockpit. The throttle, switch and right hand tank were closed, but the left hand tank valve could not be closed because it was in flames. The fire in the cockpit was smothered by a hand extinguisher. Fumes almost rendered the pilot and passengers unconscious, but the pilot opened the cockpit windows and put the ship in a nose-high sideslip, which partly cleared the fumes and kept most of the flames from the cockpit. A normal landing was made but fire flamed again in the cockpit before the ship came to a stop. Passengers were notified to prepare to leave the plane. Pilot Darnell climbed through the front exit and rode the wing struts until the plane stopped. Passengers were removed without injury. All mail except that in the cockpit was saved. The left gas tank burned out and the right exploded. The plane was a complete loss.

— (Signed) James A Farley, Postmaster General

== Later life ==
In the 1970s Darnell helped organize the Volunteer Fire Department of Flower Mound, Texas, as well as becoming a member. He was also an organizing member of the Flower Mound Summit Club, a men's charitable club. His wife Marie helped organize The Women of Flower Mound, the women's charitable club. Both clubs are still in operations as of January 2017.
