= Theodore "Ted" Nieman Kincannon =

American aviator

Ted Kincannon
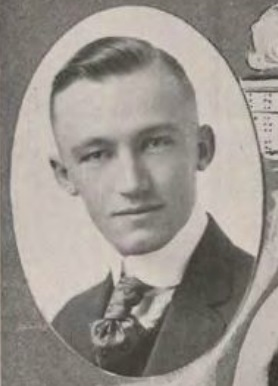
- Born: Theodore Nieman Kincannon; August 16, 1896; Boonsville, Texas, U.S.
- Died: January 29, 1936; Frisco, Texas, U.S.
- Cause of death: Trauma from Aircraft crash
- Resting place: Restland Memorial Park (Dallas, TX)
- Other names: "Terry", "Ted"
- Education: SMU
- Occupation: Aviator
- Parent(s): William Anderson Kincannon; Mary Bettie Barksdale
- Awards: Airmail Flyers' Medal of Honor (1937 - Posthumous)

Theodore Nieman Kincannon (August 16, 1896 – January 29, 1936) was an American pioneer of aviation, early airline pilot, and one of only ten recipients of the Airmail Flyers' Medal of Honor.

== Early life ==
Kincannon was born on August 16, 1896, in Boonsville, Texas, the only child of William Anderson Kincannon and Mary Bettie Barksdale.

== College ==
Kincannon attended Polytechnic College in Fort Worth, now Texas Wesleyan University, in 1913 – 1914. When the campus was re-designated as a woman's college Kincannon transferred to Southern Methodist University for studies 1915 – 1916. While attending SMU, Kincannon played baseball and managed the basketball team.

== The Army and learning to fly ==
Kincannon joined the Army and learned to fly in 1918. After his time in the Army he spent some time in Kentucky working for an Air Service company. In 1932 Kincannon went to work for American Airlines in the Dallas, Fort Worth area flying routes to St. Louis, El Paso, Amarillo, and Atlanta. He spent a short time in New Orleans as station manager. By September 1934 Kincannon was flying a new route from Dallas-Fort Worth to Chicago.

== Flight incident ==
A veteran of more than 8,100 hours in the air, Kincannon made his final flight on January 29, 1936. On the last leg of his Chicago, Dallas-Fort Worth via Oklahoma City, Oklahoma, route Kincannon ran into a blinding snow storm. Only minutes from the destination, Love Field, the carburetor heater failed, causing ice to build up, and the aircraft began to lose power. Kincannon instructed the passengers to strap themselves in and began searching for an area to make a forced landing. He spotted a field, belonging to Mr. and Mrs. Eugene Grace, near Little Elm, Denton County and began circling while planning his descent. Kincannon cut the motor, to avoid a fire starting, and committed to his approach. Mr. Grace heard the plane passing overhead and then the crash but was unable to see anything due to the blinding snow. Kincannon managed to get the plane down just 200 yards south of the farm home and a mere nine miles from Love Field. Within a few minutes the five passengers managed to walk to the Grace home and call for help. Due to the weather and rural farm roads, it took some time to get to the crash site. Kincannon was still strapped in his seat but had suffered a head wound from a piece of flying debris. His watch has stopped at 3:06, the time of the crash. He died in the ambulance on the way to Frisco. The five passengers, to include an American Airline Engineer, credited the pilot's skill with saving their lives.

The passengers were: M. P. Youker, Dallas. John Schultz, New York. T. P. Malloy, Shreveport, La. George Rice, San Antonio. William Littlewood, chief engineer, American Airlines, Chicago.

=== Medal Citation ===
For extraordinary achievement while piloting air mail plane No. NC-13767 on a flight from Oklahoma City, Oklahoma, to Dallas, Texas, on January 29, 1936. Despite the fact that the weather reports indicated that the trip could be made, Pilot Kincannon encountered snow and later icing conditions. Ice formation on the carburetor reduced engine efficiency, necessitating a forced landing. Reports of the passengers indicate that under these trying circumstances, Pilot Kincannon did not become excited. He flashed the electric sign warning all passengers to fasten their seat belts and selected the best available place for landing. Most of the reports indicate that Pilot Kincannon deliberately selected a small clump of trees which could be utilized to break the fall, and maneuvered the plane so that the shock of the landing was absorbed by the front end of the fuselage and the left wing, thus protecting the passengers and mail compartments even though it would endanger him in his location in the front cockpit where the impact would be greatest. None of the five passengers on the plane which was a single-motor type, was injured seriously. Pilot Kincannon, however, was fatally injured.

== President Roosevelt presents award ==
On April 12, 1937, President Franklin Delano Roosevelt posthumously presented Sue Kincannon, Ted's widow, with the Airmail Flyers' Medal of Honor for his actions on January 29, 1936, when he landed his plane saving the lives of his passengers and the mail.
