= John David Hissong =

Dave Hissong
- Born: John David Hissong; June 1, 1899; Winfield, Iowa, U.S.
- Died: March 22, 1978; Phoenix, Arizona, U.S.
- Resting place: Holy Cross Cemetery, Avondale, Arizona
- Occupation: Aviator
- Spouses: Vera E Lee; Anna Rose Ryan
- Children: John David, Jr. Donald Edward
- Parent(s): John Mooney Hissong; Elizabeth Jane Spangler
- Awards: Airmail Flyers' Medal of Honor (1938)

Signature
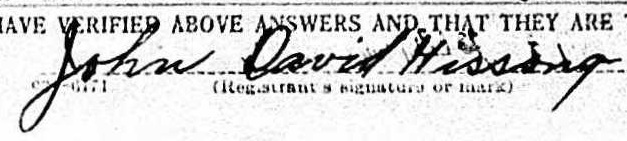

John David Hissong (June 1, 1899 – March 22, 1978) was an American farmer, machinist, auto mechanic, mail clerk, airmail pilot and early commercial aviation pilot of the 1930s and 40s. Captain Hissong was one of only ten pilots, and the last, to receive the Airmail Flyers' Medal of Honor.

== Early life ==
John David (Dave) Hissong was the first of two children born to John Mooney Hissong and Elizabeth Jane Spangler. Dave was born in Winfield, Iowa about 14 miles Northeast of Mt. Pleasant. In the first few years of his life his family moved to Scott Township and then on to Olds, Iowa. Around 1910 the family went to Clayton, New Mexico for a short time but returned to the Olds area where Dave finished High School.

Hissong was a self employed machinist in 1918 when he registered for the draft; however he was not called into service. He continued working as a Machinist until early 1920. He was working as a mail clerk in Winfield when he married local girl Vera Elizabeth Lee in 1920. They had no children and divorced eight years later in Colorado.

Dave and Vera moved to Denver, Colorado, and Dave found worked as a mechanic for James Nash Motors of Denver. In 1927 Dave completed flying lessons from Cloyd Peart Clevenger in Denver. Cloyd was working for Alexander Aircraft Factory in nearby Colorado Springs, Colorado. Not long after his divorce James Nash Motors closed and Hissong began working for Colorado Airways.

== Pilot ==
=== Colorado Airways ===
Colorado Airways was awarded Airmail Route CAM 12 between Pueblo, Colorado, and Cheyenne, Wyoming, with interim stops in Denver and Colorado Springs. Hissong was assigned flying a feeder leg between Pueblo and Amarillo, Texas, on the inauguration 31 May. Colorado Airways lost its airmail route contract 1 October 1927 and less than a week later the route was turned over to Western Air Express (WAE). Dave continued flying the route between Denver and Cheyenne under the new owner of CAM 12, WAE who already had the CAM 4 contract.

=== Western Air Express ===
==== Save the mail ====
Hissong was flying a Fokker Super Universal from Denver, Colorado to Albuquerque, New Mexico, on 3 December 1933 when between Trinidad, Colorado and Las Vegas, New Mexico at about 800 feet he smelled smoke. He discovered the engine exhaust manifold was red hot and radioed the T-W-A station in Albuquerque he was going to make a forced landing. He managed to land near Watrous, New Mexico at 10:15 AM and saved all the mail before the plane was completely destroyed by flames. There were no passengers on the flight. After the Post Office canceled all contracts in 1934 Hissong went to Washington, D.C.

=== Eastern Air Lines, Inc. ===
When the post office opened air mail contracts to civilian corporation bids again Hissong moved his family to Atlanta, Georgia, where he was flying for Eastern Air Lines.

== Flight incident of 18 October 1938 ==
Flying for Eastern Airlines on the route from New Orleans, Louisiana, to New York City, New York, in DC-2 tail number NC-13735, Captain Dave Hissong had just taken off from an intermediate stop in Montgomery, Alabama and was en route for Atlanta, Georgia at about 10:44 PM when the right engine began to vibrate. The vibration got worse as the engine begin to fail and over heat catching fire. The fire from the engine eventually burned through the engine's fittings holding it to the airplane and it fell free. As the fire began to spread to the wing and body of the plane Dave managed to keep the plane under control, and with only the light of the moon and the burning plane, landed in a cotton field about four miles from Montgomery just off the Atlanta Highway and just 500 yards from where the burning motor had landed. The burning wing was sheared off by a tree during the landing but the fire continued on the fuselage of the plane. The steward, Frank Gibbs, had the rear passenger door open and as soon as the plane came to a stop evacuated all the passengers to safety. Captain Hissong and 1st Pilot Clyde R. Russell were trapped in the control room by the fire and were forced to climb out the trap door. No sooner were all out of the plane and to safety the flames had fully engulfed the entire plane.

Passengers:

- John H Sotham, going to NYC.
- D Drucker, going to NYC.
- Z. Lebenson, going to NYC.
- R B Kahle, going to NYC.
- Joseph Vincent Connolly, (Syndicated Newspaper Editor/Executive of Hearst newspapers) going to NYC.
- J Henry Bouck, going to Washington DC.
- Dr. James Thomas Nix, (Dean of the Louisiana State University Graduate School of Medicine) going to NYC.
- Eurith Dickinson Rivers, Jr.(Son of Georgia Governor) going to Atlanta.
- George Stuart, going to Atlanta, Georgia.
- W. O. Fotte, Jr (Eastern Airlines manager for Alabama) going to Atlanta.
- Franklin F Vonnegut (New Orleans district traffic Mgr. for Eastern Airline)

== Watch and clock repairman ==
Hissong was also an excellent watch and clock repairman. He enjoyed working out of his home in his spare time. In the early 1940s he was introduced to the owner of Timms Jewelry by friend and coworker Howard Weant. Brad Timms store was in the heart of the Atlanta business district and Timms gave Dave all the work he wanted and offered Dave the job of running the business for the same pay Dave received from the airline. Timms wanted to spend more of his time fishing but Hissong was not ready to give up flying and stayed with Eastern.

== Medal from the President ==
On 4 October 1948, almost exactly 10 years after the incident, Captain John David Hissong was presented with the Airmail Flyers' Medal of Honor by Jesse M. Donaldson, the acting Postmaster General at the time, on behalf of President Harry Truman. This was the 10th and final award presentation for the Airmail Flyers' Medal of Honor.

=== Medal citation ===
For extraordinary valor and achievement while piloting air mail plane No. NC 13735 on a flight from New Orleans to New York on the night of October 18, 1938. Soon after takeoff from the intermediate stop at Montgomery, Alabama for the flight to Atlanta, Georgia extreme vibrations set up in the right engine and there was progressive failure of its component parts. Fire of intense heat from escaping gasoline and oil enveloped the engine and right wing and progressed toward the cabin. The engine burned from its fittings and dropped from the plane. The pilot, with great skill and courage, manipulated the controls to compensate for loss of the engine and burning wing, kept the plane aloft until dwellings were cleared, and then landed in the darkness without landing gear in such manner that, although the burning wing was sheared off by contact with a tree, there was no impact. The passengers were freed from the plane a few seconds before it was entirely consumed. Beside three members of the plane crew, there were eleven passengers who earnestly say that they are indebted for their lives to the courage of Pilot Hissong, who alone was injured by minor burns.
