= Wellington Porter McFail =

American pilot (1892–1965)

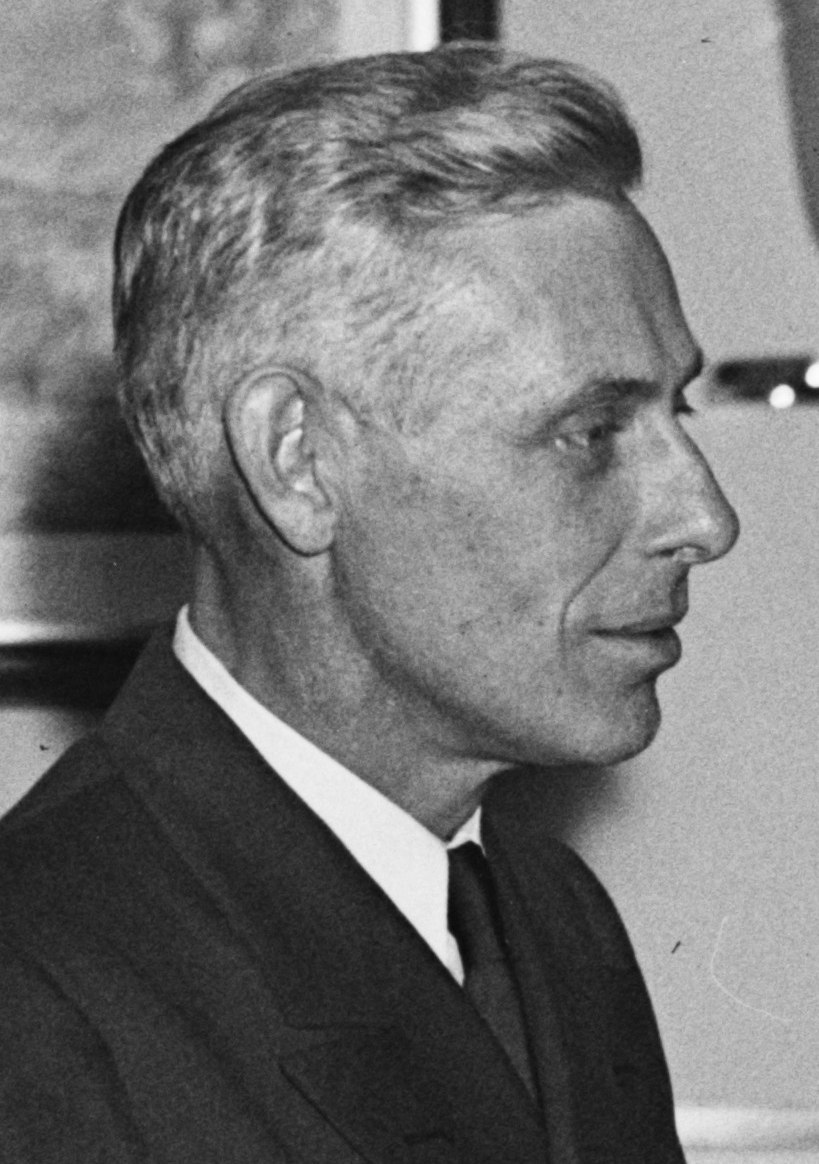
- Cropped image of McFail waiting to receive Airmail Flyers' Medal of Honor from FDR.
- Born: January 30, 1892; Portage, Wisconsin, U.S.
- Died: February 7, 1965; Fort Worth, Texas, U.S.
- Other name: W. P. McPhail
- Occupation: Aviator
- Awards: Airmail Flyers' Medal of Honor (1933)

Signature
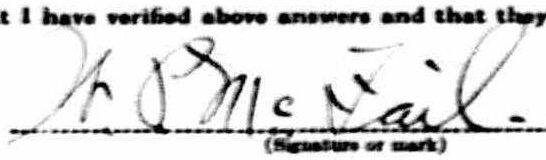

Wellington Porter McFail (aka W. P. McPhail; January 30, 1892 – February 7, 1965) was a pioneering pilot, barnstormer, wing walker, airline and air mail pilot, and one of only ten recipients of the Airmail Flyers' Medal of Honor.

Born 30 January 1892, W.P. was the youngest of 4 children born to Francis Robert McFail and Elsie Elizabeth Irons, in Portage, Wisconsin. His mother died when he was only 4 years old and his father remarried Allie "Olive" J Lintner.

== Career ==
His World War I draft card shows he was working as a Locomotive Fireman for the Chicago, Milwaukee, St. Paul and Pacific Railway out of Great Falls, Montana. After World War I he joined up with a flying circus barnstorming as a wing walker and began his lifelong carrier with flying.

May 1, 1928, W. P. McFail began flying for American Airways Company. In 1934 American Airways slipped into financial straits and was acquired by corporate raider Errett Lobban Cord. After the acquisition American Airways Company was renamed American Airlines.

On page 18 of the July 18, 1938, issue of Time Magazine, McFail is one of 10 "ace" pilots mentioned for having a decade a peace of safe airmail / passenger travel. A special poster was created by American Airlines touting the achievement by the pilots and McFail was one of 2 specifically talked about in the quarter page article.

"Wellington McFail has known the most adventure. He started his career as a wing-walker with a barnstorming air circus. One day in 1933, he was flying a transport plane over Texas when the entire nose suddenly cracked and fell, carrying the engine with it, McFail managed to bring the fuselage safely to earth, and was awarded a medal for his achievements".

By December 1, 1939, McFail was the 7th most senior pilot at American Airlines.

McFail died at a Fort Worth hospital in 1965.

=== Flight incident ===
December 6, 1933 McFail was making the short flight from Texarkana, Texas to Dallas, Texas flying an Orion with a load of Airmail. Just 40 minutes into the routine flight the nose of the aircraft, with the entire engine, broke loose and fell from the air craft. McFail prepared to parachute from the doomed aircraft but was able to regain some control and made an emergency landing, saving all of the airmail on board.

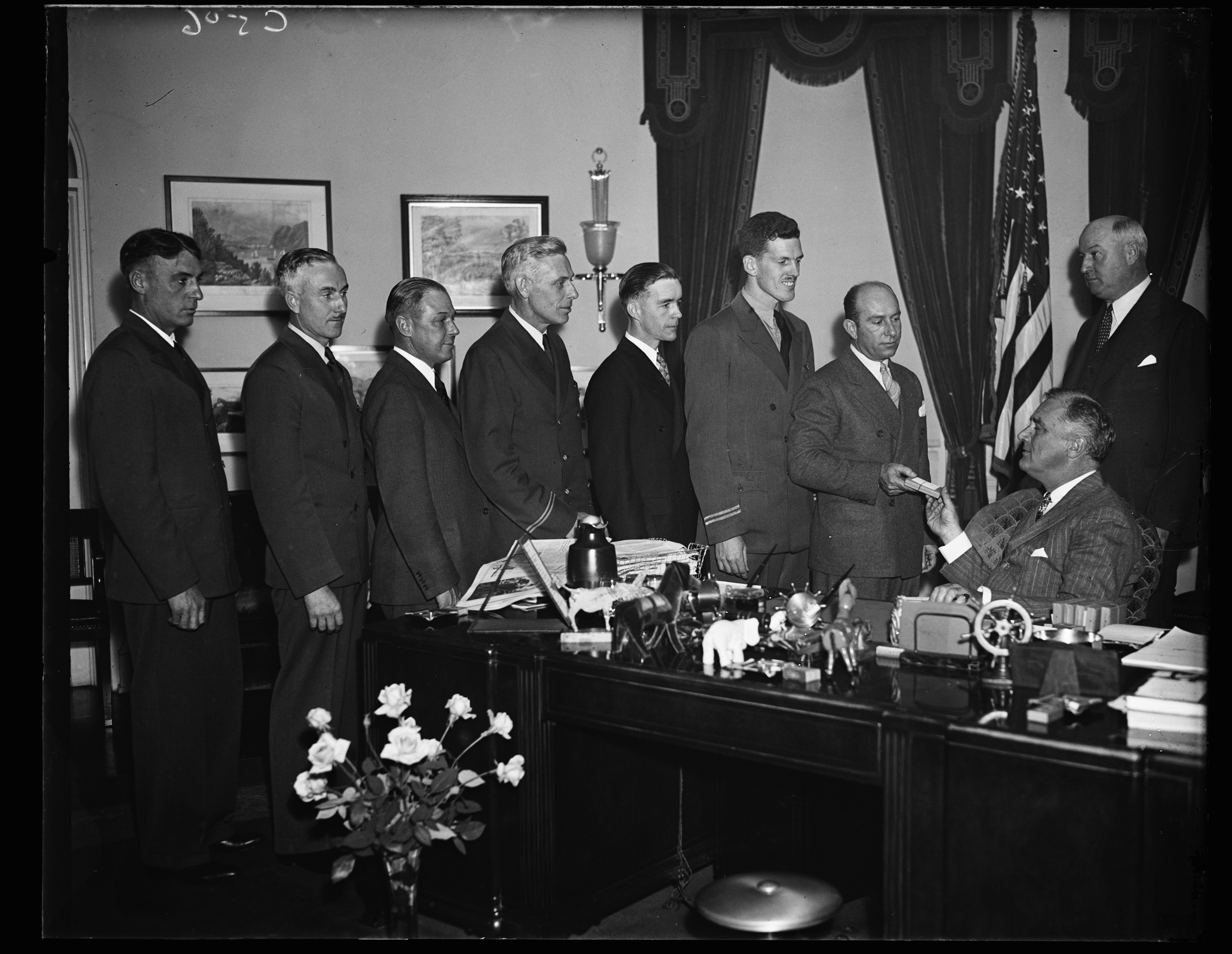
Roosevelt awards the Airmail Flyers Medal of Honor to 7 pilots, with McFail being the fourth in line to receive the medal from the President.

For this feat, on 29 October 1935 at a ceremony (12:00–12:15) in the White House, McFail was one of seven aviators awarded the Airmail Flyers' Medal of Honor by President Franklin Delano Roosevelt for extraordinary achievement. All seven had saved the mail by making hazardous landings. Present at the ceremony were: President Franklin Delano Roosevelt; Postmaster General James A Farley; Lewis S. Turner of Fort Worth, Texas; James H. Carmichael, Jr. of Detroit, Michigan; Edward A. Bellande of Los Angeles, California; Gordon S. Darnell of Kansas City, Missouri; Willington P. McFail of Murfreesboro, Tennessee; Roy H. Warner of Portland, Oregon; and Grover Tyler of Seattle, Washington. McFail's deed was chronicled on the well-known Wheaties cereal box cover as part of a series of eight box covers regarding the feats of pilots awarded the Air Mail Flyers Medal of Honor.

=== Medal citation ===
For extraordinary achievement while piloting air mail plane No. NC 12285 on a flight from Texarkana to Dallas, Texas, on the afternoon of December 6, 1933. Pilot McFail left Texarkana at 1:10 p.m. and shortly after 1:50 p.m., while flying at an altitude of 5900 feet, a slight motor vibration was noted, followed later by a rending crash and jar as the motor ripped loose from the plane. Pilot McFail's head and body were forced to his knees as the plane was immediately whipped up in a vertical climb to about 6500 feet as a result of the loss of the weight of the motor. He could not open his eyes for the moment but on regaining muscular control he noted the plane had reached the peak of its climb and was falling off to the right. It went into a half turn with tail down and right wing pointing down. The pilot felt pressure on the controls and righted the ship into a dive. He unbuckled his belt to jump but realizing that he had some control over the plane he decided that he could land it with a good chance of not hurting the ship or himself. He remembered that there was an emergency landing field in the vicinity and re-buckled his belt, determined to land the plane in the field if possible. Relying on his experience with a glider, he maneuvered a figure "S" and brought the plane to a landing, without further damage to the plane or to himself and with no damage to the mail.
