= Lewis S. Turner =

Lewis Turner
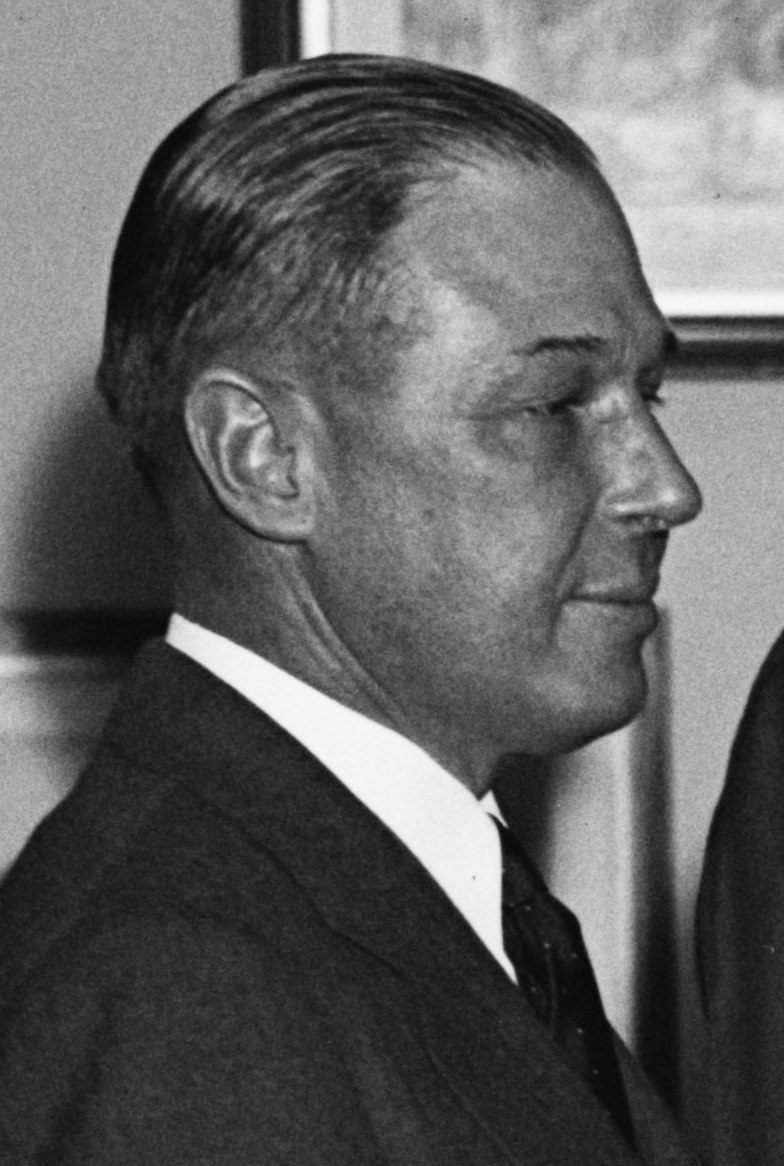
- Born: Lewis Summers Truner; December 12, 1888; Charleston, Mississippi, U.S.
- Died: January 2, 1951; Houston, Texas, U.S.
- Other name: Lew
- Occupation: Aviator
- Spouse(s): Ida M Crenshaw (1909); Louise Euna Lauhon (1921)
- Children: 3
- Awards: Airmail Flyers' Medal of Honor (1935)

Lewis Summers Turner (December 12, 1888 – January 2, 1951) was an American clerk, automobile salesman, Army pilot, barnstormer, airmail pilot, airline pilot, and one of ten recipients of the Airmail Flyers' Medal of Honor.

== Early years ==
Lewis Summers Turner was born on 12 December 1888 in Charleston, Mississippi. He was the first of two children born to Lewis R Turner and Evelyn Mary Summers, both of Mississippi. Turner had one sibling, sister Margaret Evelyn, that was 12 years younger than he. After the death of his father in 1898 his mother remarried to an Attorney named Anselm Helm Jayne and the family moved to Texas.

== Military ==
While in Texas Turner spent two years in the Militia and worked as a Clerk in the 1st Texas Cavalry of the 36th Division. When the draft went into effect in 1917 Turner was working as an automobile salesman and was married to his first wife. He became a cadet at the School of Military Aeronautics, Air Service in Fort Worth, Texas (2-578-629) and later a 2nd Lieutenant (0-230284) in the United States Army Air Corps Reserve. Turner served from 5 January 1918 until 8 January 1919 and spent all his active duty time in Texas. He was made an instructor at Carruthers Field, one of three Fort Worth fields at the time and later he was an Instructor for the aviation ground school at the University of Texas.

== Career ==
=== Motor cars ===
For a short time before WWI Turner worked as a Machinist in 1916 for the Ford Motor Company in Memphis, Tennessee. Then in 1917 he became a Salesman for Powell Motor Company at the first showroom for Ford's in Vicksburg before going into the service during the war. After getting out of the service Turner went to work as a local sales representative for Palmer Abbott Auto Company of New Orleans, selling Curtiss airplanes before being hired as a pilot.

=== Curtiss airplanes ===
Like many post war aviators Turner continued using his skills to make a living. Turner spent many years as a sales representative for the Curtiss Aeroplane and Motor Company including working for several small locally owned companies across the south central United States. This work caused him to travel and spend a lot of time away from home and his family. Turner was based in places like Vicksburg, Mississippi; New Orleans, Louisiana; Tulsa, Oklahoma; Dallas, Texas supporting the surrounding areas with Curtiss Planes and Plane parts as well as taking people on rides, and acrobatic thrills. Turner also continued to act as an instructor for employers and at times operating his own pilot school. On 4 September 1924 Turner received a wire from his wife in Louisiana that their only child, son Robert, was seriously ill. Turner made the flight from Dallas to Monroe, Louisiana in his Curtiss plane in about 6 hours to be with his son. Robert Howard Turner died within 24 hours of his father's arrival. Robert shares a plot with his mother in Arkansas.

=== American Airways inc ===
In 1930 Turner made the move from sales, leaving Garland Aircraft Corporation in Tulsa, and moved to Houston, Texas and full-time piloting. He found work with American Airways in their Southern Airway Division based in San Antonio, Texas. It was while on a routine American Airways flight the evening of 16 March 1933 Turner had to use his skills to save the lives of his passengers and his cargo during a flight incident in which his plane caught fire just after takeoff from Fort Worth en route to Dallas. After the Air Mail Scandal of February 1934 the government cancelled all airmail contracts. American lost its airmail contract and Turner made another move, this time too Long & Harmon, Inc in Dallas.

=== Long & Harmon inc ===
Long & Harmon (L&H) was awarded a temporary, one-year, contract on 20 April for the airmail route Turner had been flying for American. They had ordered some Ford Trimotor's to increase capacity and be more competitive for the airmail bids that were going to be opened, but they had no multi-engine qualified pilots. Turner, along with Maurice M Kay and George L Hays, were hired to solve this issue due to their multi-engine qualifications. On 1 June 1934 Turner made the inaugural flight of the new Long-Harmon air mail and passenger route connecting Fort Worth and Amarillo with Brownsville and Galveston. They were able to carry more mail, in one of the five L&H Stinson Reliant monoplanes, than was carried under the old schedule Turner had flown with American Airways before the route suspension on 10 September 1933. The new big tri-motor Fords were put on the schedule 1 October 1934. After receiving their first paycheck Turner and the others noticed they were not being paid as the new law stated they should so Turner contacted friend Dave Behncke, head of the new Air Line Pilots Association (ALPA), for help. When notified of the issue H&L fired the pilots.

=== Barham Oil Drilling ===
After being fired from L&H Turner found work flying for a small drilling company out of Midland, Texas. George Beverly Barham ran an oil drilling company out of Louisiana that was doing work in the oil fields of west Texas near the panhandle. Barham had a Stinson that Turner piloted for him flying out of Midland, Texas.

=== Pan American Airways inc ===
Turner went to work for Pan American Airways, inc after being illegally fired by L&H. Pan-Am also had offices in Dallas and during WWII Turner worked as a pilot instructor. With the end of the war Turner transferred to San Antonio, Texas as part of the South American Department where he flew as co-pilot on the route between Brownsville, Texas and Tampico, Mexico. His last flying was done as co-pilot on the route between Brownsville and Tegucigalpa, Honduras. Turner retired in 1948 in failing health and returned to Mississippi.

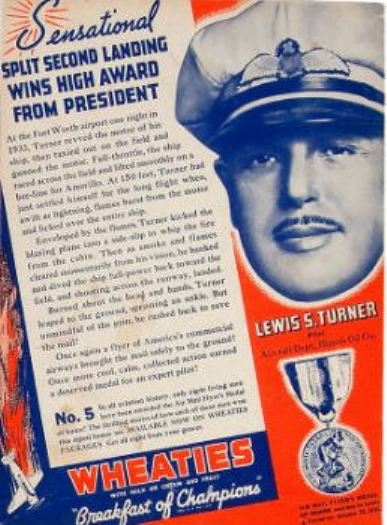
1937 era Wheaties cereal box cover #5 of 8 in the Airmail Flyers' Medal of Honor series.

== Flight incident ==
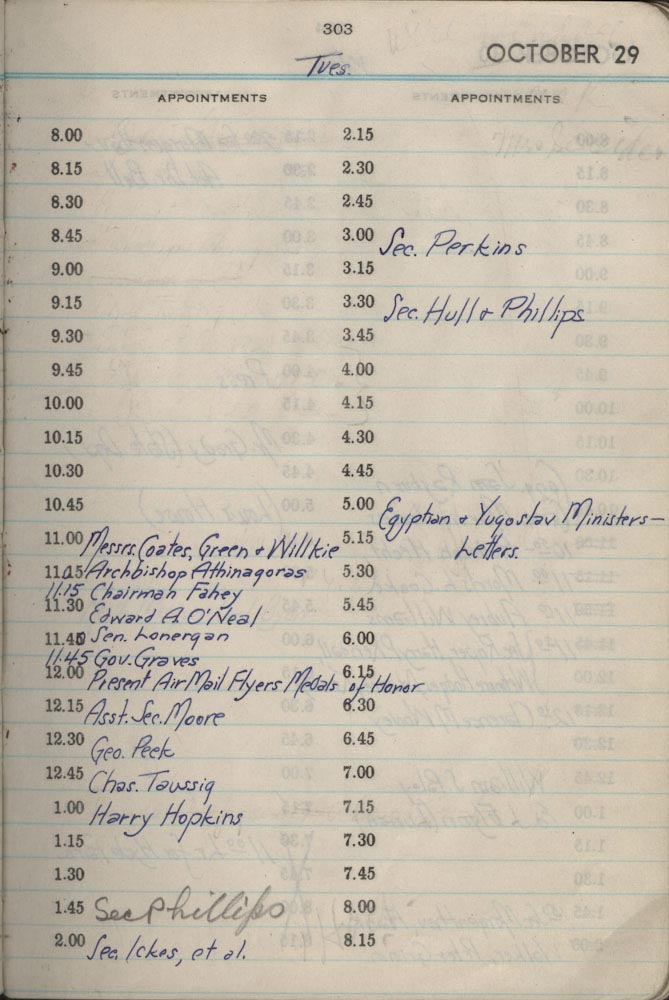
Daily appointment log for FDR showing appointment to present medal to 8 Airmail Flyers

On the evening of 16 March 1933 Turner was at the controls of one of the Fairchild 100-A Pilgrim (NC-731 N) aircraft built for American Airways Inc beginning in 1931. The scheduled flight was a trip from Fort Worth Municipal airport to Amarillo via Dallas and on board was the typical load of Airmail as well as two passengers. Merle Brock, another pilot for American Airways, was on board as a passenger being shuttled to Dallas. R Staulter, the Station Manager for American Airways, was also on his way back to Dallas. The flight begin as any other however fire suddenly seemed to engulf the plane from nose to tail when they had only reached an altitude of about 150 feet. Turner immediately banked steeply to return to the field for an emergency landing. The two passengers opened the side compartment door and jumped from the plane before it had come to a stop. Turner opened the top hatch to leave the cockpit but the flames prevented him making his escape. He then opened the cockpit side door and jumped, spraining his ankle due to the height of the jump. Due to the fire around him Turner was unable to use the specially placed footholds for climbing in and out of the cockpit. He ran to get his passengers out, finding they had made their escape he entered the passenger compartment and grabbed the sacks of mail. Shortly after Turner left the plane the gasoline tank in one of the wings exploded. The three men escaped with their lives and were transported to the hospital. Turner left the hospital immediately after burns on his hands were treated. Brock had abrasions on his hands and burns on his neck. Staulter was treated for burns on the face and hands and dislocated shoulder. Brock and Staulter remained in the hospital. The fire damaged the plane badly and partially burned three of the mail pouches, one of which was from Amarillo.

== Medal from the President ==
29 October 1935 at a ceremony (12:00 - 12:15) in the White House Turner was one of seven aviators awarded the Airmail Flyers’ Medal of Honor by president Franklin Delano Roosevelt for extraordinary achievement. All seven of the pilots saved the mail in hazardous landings.

Present at the ceremony were: President, Franklin Delano Roosevelt; Postmaster General, James A Farley; Lewis S Turner of Fort Worth, Texas; James H Carmichael, Jr. of Detroit, Michigan; Edward A Bellande of Los Angeles, California; Gordon S Darnell of Kansas City, Missouri; Willington P McFail of Murfreesboro, Tennessee; Roy H Warner of Portland, Oregon; And Grover Tyler of Seattle, Washington. Turner's deed was chronicled on the well known Wheaties cereal box cover as part of a series of 8 box covers regarding the feats of pilot's awarded the Air Mail Flyers Medal of Honor.

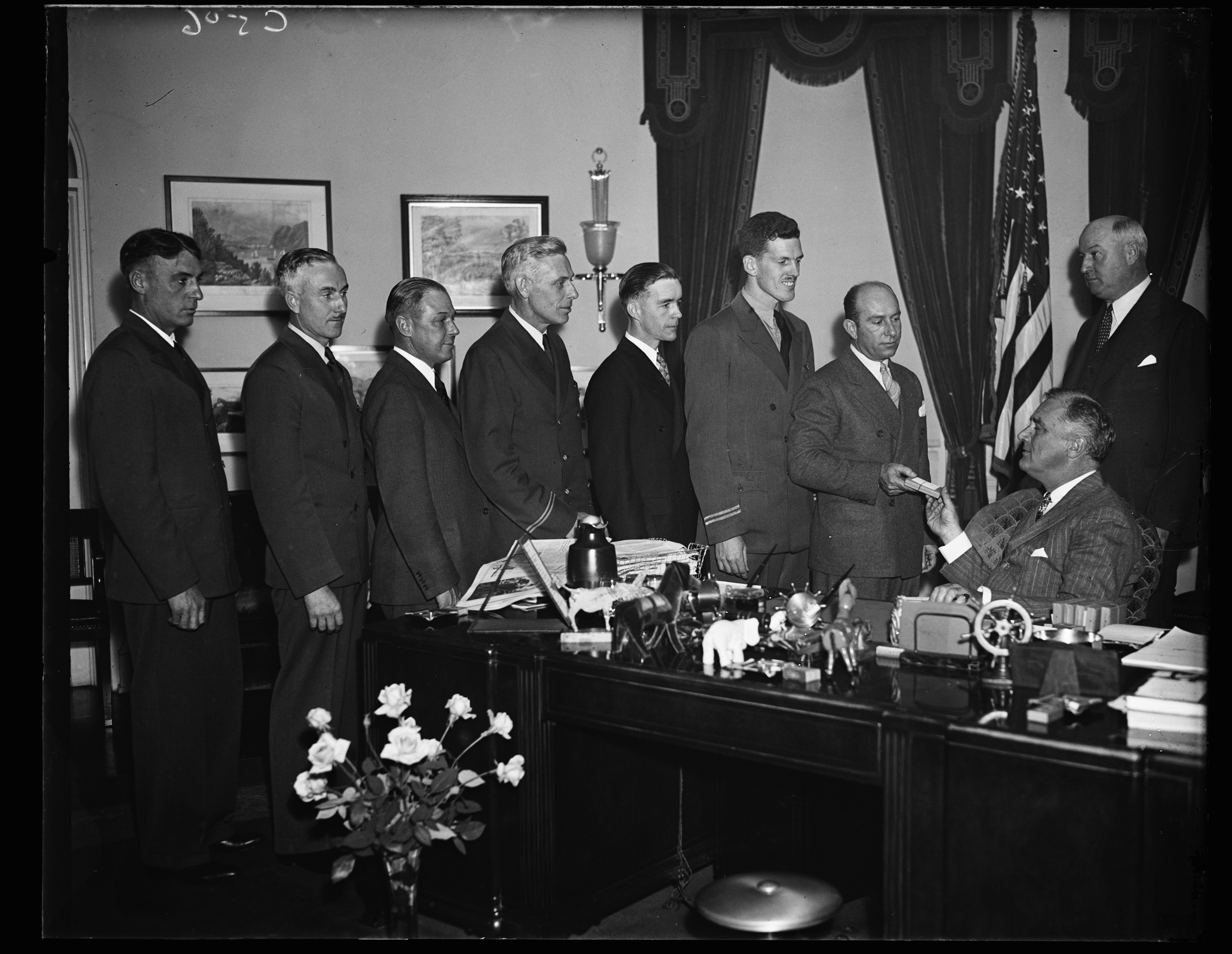
Roosevelt awards the Airmail Flyers Medal of Honor to 7 pilots, with Turner being the third from the left in the photo.

=== Medal citation ===
“For extraordinary achievement while piloting air mail plane No. NC-732 N on a flight from Fort Worth to Amarillo, Texas, on the night of March 16, 1933. On the take-off from Fort Worth, while at an altitude of approximately 150 feet, the plane burst into flames and was almost instantly a mass of fire from the propeller to rudder. Pilot Turner turned abruptly down wind to avoid landing on houses and other obstructions and landed at the airport from which he took off. The heat in the cabin was so intense and passengers leaped from the plane immediately after it was so intense and passengers leaped from the plane immediately after landed and before it came to a stop. Although burned and injured both were saved. Pilot Turner did not leave the plane until after it had stopped. He attempted to make an exit from the top door of the cockpit but was prevented from doing so by flames. Although the wings were burning he jumped through the side door of the cockpit. His hands, forehead and ears were burned and his ankle sprained from the jump. He immediately turned his attention to the passengers until he saw that they had jumped. Most of the mail was recovered and salvaged.”

(Signed) James A Farley

Postmaster General"

== Later life and death ==
Turner retired from Pan American and flying in February 1948. He spent 31 years of flying, his last being in Honduras for Pan-American. He flew during WWI and was a pilot instructor during WW II with Pan-American. After retirement he suffered from poor health and spent much of his time at the Veterans Administration Hospital in Jackson, Mississippi. He was living with his mother Evelyn Kingston and his sister Marguerite Ford there in Jackson. He had gone to visit his son, Private Lewis Summers Turner, Jr serving at Lackland Air Force Base, and suffered a heart attack dying at his son's home in San Antonio, Texas on 2 January 1951. Turner was interred at Fort Sam Houston National Cemetery 5 January 1951.
