= Mal Freeburg =

American pilot (1906–1963)

Mal Bryan Freeburg
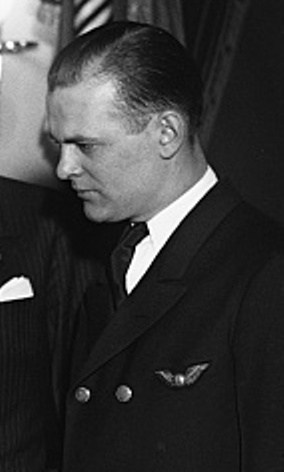
- Born: June 3, 1906; Blackduck, Minnesota, U.S.
- Died: October 5, 1963 (aged 57); Orange County, California, U.S.
- Resting place: Sunset Memorial Park Cemetery
- Occupation: Aviator
- Spouse(s): Ruth Evelyn Smith, 1926; Violet Melvina Morinville, 1936
- Children: James "Jim" Monroe Freeburg, 1930; Patricia Ruth Freeburg, 1934
- Parent(s): Jay Monroe Freeburg; Bonita A Bryan
- Awards: Airmail Flyers' Medal of Honor

Signature
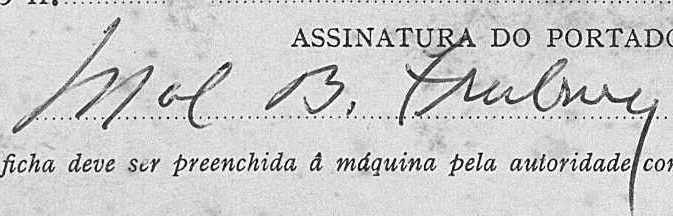

Mal Bryan Freeburg (March 6, 1906 – May 10, 1963) was an American pioneer aviator, barnstormer, test pilot, airline pilot, executive and the first recipient of the prestigious Airmail Flyers' Medal of Honor award, one of only ten such awards ever presented.

== Early life and education ==
He was born in Blackduck, Minnesota, the only child of Dr. Jay Monroe Freeburg and Bonita A Bryan. His father was the local dentist. After World War 1 the Freeburg family left Blackduck and moved to Minneapolis, where in 1924 he graduated from West High School. He then went on to attend the University of Minnesota, studying law. It was after having spent three years at the University of Minnesota that a classmate later recalled "on a spring day in 1926 airplanes popped into his head for no reason at all."

== Early aviation and family life ==
He bought a second-hand Canadian Curtis the next day. He left school and was trained to fly by the then well-known stunt pilot Vernon L "Vern" Roberts. He soloed on June 1, 1926. To celebrate he eloped with Ruth Evelyn Smith, of a prominent St. Paul family. He and Ruth took a flying honeymoon, believed to be the first in the area and possibly the nation, barnstorming through South Dakota and on to California for the winter. Along the way they would stop to visit relatives and Freeburg would take passengers for observation rides to pay their way covering some 35,000 miles.

After the honeymoon he bought an old Army Surplus biplane, (NC2405) Standard J-1, 13, and for a short time they established the Freeburg Flying Service in Shenandoah, Iowa. In 1927 new legislation banned the Standard J-1 as a passenger aircraft due to a high number of accidents but not before he set his first speed record on a trip from Thief River Falls, Minnesota, to Minneapolis in just three hours. He also earned 40 cents per minute taking a photographer up for photos over Ashland, Wisconsin. Mal became so well known the locals called him "Our Lindberg". Mal and Ruth joined other pilots and took on missionary work for aviation barnstorming the midwest.

== Air mail pilot and pioneer ==
In 1928 they settled in Richfield, Minnesota, a suburb of Minneapolis. By December he was hired by Charles W. Holman to fly for Northwest Airways, later called Northwest Airlines (NWA). He began his airline career flying the first airmail service to the Fox River Valley from Milwaukee to Green Bay, Wisconsin, in a single-engine open-cockpit biplane. By this time his pilot's log already showed more than 1,400 hours in the air.

=== Save the train from disaster ===
In 1929 he became one of the first pilots flying the airmail from Minneapolis-St Paul to Chicago at night in a four-hour schedule. It was on one of these very flights, July 12, 1930, along the Chippewa River, he spotted a train bridge ablaze and a train headed right for it. Freeburg left his flight path and began diving toward the train engine, crisscrossing its path near Trevino, Wisconsin, and dropping flares to signal the engineer of the trouble until the train came to a stop just 400 yards from the bridge. It turned out that amateur golfer Bobby Jones was one of the passengers on that train, on his way back to Atlanta after his victory in the U.S. Open at Interlachen. Mal became an instant hero, and with some fanfare he was thanked by the Burlington Railroad with a gold watch and a $100 reward from the Chicago Tribune. When Freeburg turned in his flight report the only mention of the event was that he needed a new supply of flares. On July 23, 1930, Ruth and Mal had their first child, James "Jim" Monroe Freeburg. It wasn't long after that Mal began taking little Jim up on his lap. By the time Jim was 13 he demanded his father teach him how to fly.

=== Motor falls off during flight ===
On 12 April 1931 flying his route between St. Paul and Chicago and shortly after leaving Minneapolis, a motor of Freeburg's tri-motored plane shook loose and tangled in the landing gear. Freeburg kept the plane aloft with the two remaining engines, flew to the Mississippi River and by maneuvering he shook the tangled third motor into the river. He then returned to a nearby landing field and brought his plane with eight passengers and mail safely to the ground. The passengers and cargo were transferred to another aircraft and completed the flight on schedule. Seventeen days later Freeburg was recommended to receive a new medal.

=== Proving passenger flight over the Rockies ===
In 1933 he was on the NWA crew that proved passenger service over the Rockies in the winter was feasible. Amelia Earhart was also on that flight, mainly for PR purposes. Freeburg had flown her into the Twin Cities for the trip. Neither of them liked the other very much. On July 21, 1934, Ruth and Mal had their second child, Patricia Ruth Freeburg. In less than two months he has to make another emergency landing but had more time to prepare for this one. On September 19, 1934, flying a Lockheed Electra from Chicago, the landing gear failed to extend. He flew the aircraft over St. Paul for more than two hours to empty the fuel tanks before making an emergency landing with his 5 passengers safe and only slight damage to the plane.

== Test pilot and airline executive ==
He and Ruth divorced and in 1936 he married Violet Melvina Morinville. He continued to fly for NWA and in 1938 made news once again, this time by successfully making a high-altitude flight from St. Paul to Billings and then on to Salt Lake City using a newly designed oxygen nose mask. He later flew a second test flight using the new mask with the group of inventors from the Mayo Clinic and his new wife as passengers. On March 10, 1938, NWA promoted him to superintendent of the Eastern Division. Soon millions of Americans would become familiar with Freeburg when General Mills puts out a series of Wheaties cereal boxes with the heroics of Freeburg and seven other brave airmail pilots that were awarded the Airmail Flyers' Medal of Honor.

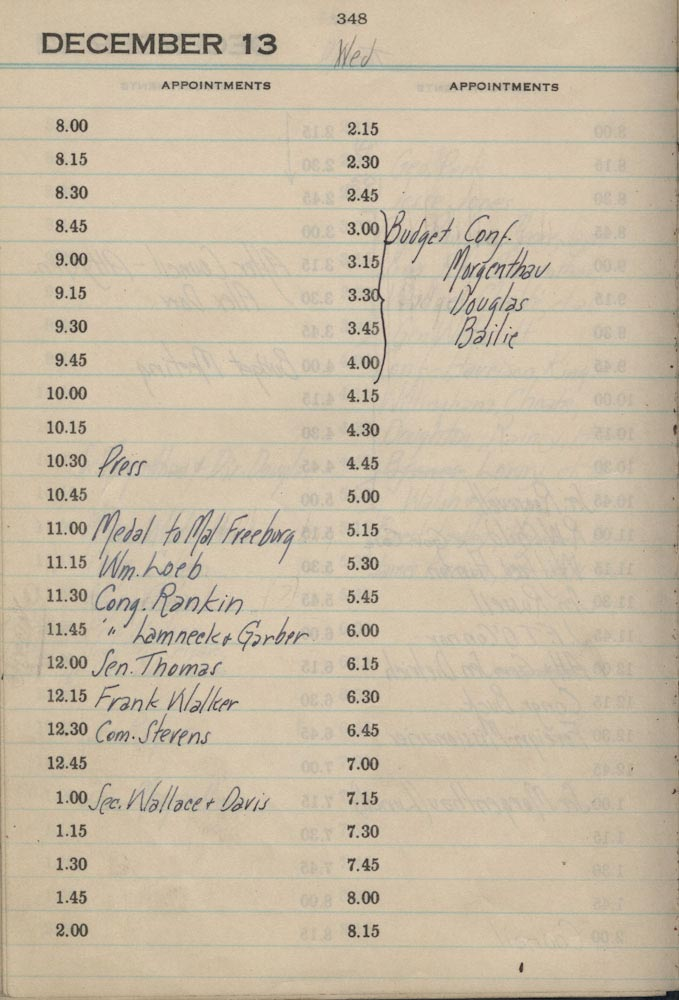
President FDR daily schedule for 13 December 1933 showing 11 AM appointment to present medal to Freeburg.

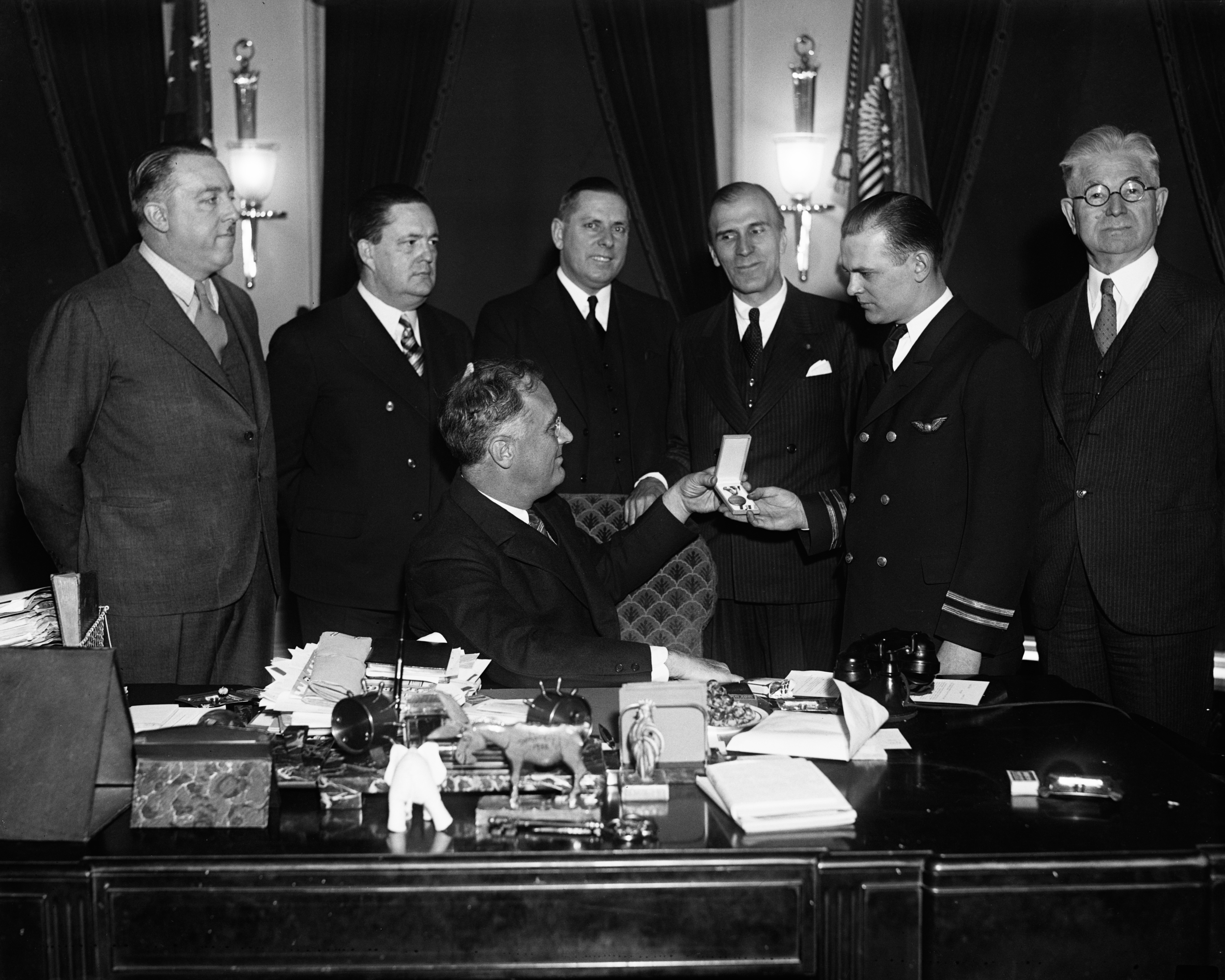
President FDR presents Freeburg with first Airmail Flyers' Medal of Honor

== Medal from the President ==
By 29 April 1932 President Herbert Hoover was prepared to present Freeburg with the first of a new air mail pilot's medal for Heroism after being recognized for his action of courage and resourcefulness on 12 April 1931 and prior on 12 July 1930. On 13 December 1933, at 11 AM in a ceremony held in the White House, the recently elected President Franklin Delano Roosevelt would make the presentation of the first "Airmail Flyers' Medal of Honor" due to delays in the medal design and the presidential election.

=== Citation ===
On April 12, 1932, Pilot Freeburg, with co-pilot Joe Kimm, departed from St. Paul, Minnesota, at 3 p.m. en route to Chicago. The plane carried 8 passengers, 6 men and 2 women, besides a load of mail. The plane made its regular stop at Minneapolis at 3:09 p.m. and left at 3:15 p.m. en route to Chicago via Milwaukee. Approximately 45 minutes later, while flying at an altitude of about 2,000 feet in ideal weather, with everything functioning perfectly, the pilot suddenly experienced a terrific jolt. A glance showed that the left outboard motor was vibrating terribly, due to a portion of the propeller having let go. While in the act of cutting the switch, the motor broke loose from its mounting and the pilot, not knowing for the moment what its effect would be on the other motors, cut all the switches and then investigated further. He found that the motor had lodged on the left landing gear struts. Again Freeburg switched on the other two motors and still had an altitude of about 1800 feet. The plane was operating very well considering the additional resistance caused by the motor shell still being in place with a large opening remaining, due to the loss of the motor.

Pilot Freeburg stated that his next thought was to get rid of the motor, but as he was flying over a farming district he was apprehensive that it might land on a dwelling. As a result, the course was altered and the ship pointed its nose over the Mississippi River. Freeburg intended to shake the motor off the landing gear and drop it into the river, if possible. On approaching a fair-sized island in the river, he succeeded in maneuvering the plane so that the motor fell off. The pilot then turned the plane around and proceeded to the Wabasha emergency landing field, about 235 miles east. The damage to the landing wheel was such that the wheel would not revolve and the tire was cut open. But a safe landing was made without any further damage.

The incident had already been reported to the operating headquarters at St. Paul by radio at the time of occurrence, and a relief ship was immediately dispatched to Wabasha, where pilots Freeburg and Kimm transferred their passengers and mail and continued the trip to Chicago. One of the distinguished features of this occurrence is the fact that during all of this time, Pilot Freeburg was talking into his radio phone, advising St. Paul of what had happened and outlining what he was attempting to do. (Because there was only a short delay in the flight, it was not recorded as an interrupted flight.)

== Mayor and foreign airmail ==
In 1942 he ran for and was elected Mayor of Richfield but continued to fly for NWA. Twice he was promoted to an executive position, but he always insisted he continue as a pilot after his work was completed. During World War II he blazed the trail for a military route from Alaska along the Aleutian Islands. In 1948 he flew NWA's first flight of a Foreign Air Mail route, FAM-95, from Seattle, Washington, to Honolulu, Hawaii. This same year the most memorable aviation event of his life occurred when his son, Jim, joined him flying for NWA. The father-and-son pair made news flying with Mal as pilot and Jim as co-pilot. Mal remarked his only regret was that he wished Jim would call him Mal instead of Dad.

== Retirement and commemoration ==
He retired in 1952 and died on the 10th of May 1963 at the age of 57. Freeburg was inducted in the Minnesota Aviation Hall of Fame in 1990. Richfield declared Saturday June 12, 2010, Mal Freeburg Day.
