= Boonsville, Texas =

Unincorporated community in Texas, US

Coordinates: 33°04′06″N 97°51′48″W

Boonsville is an unincorporated community in Wise County, Texas, United States.

== History ==
In 1878, a post office was established in Boonsville. It closed in 1965.

== Notable person ==
- Theodore "Ted" Nieman Kincannon (1896-1936), a pioneer of aviation, was born in Boonsville.
