= Airmail Flyers' Medal of Honor =

Airmail Flyers Medal of Honor
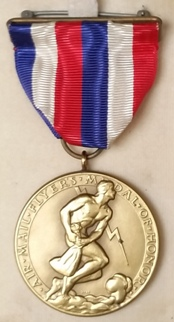
- Obverse of the Airmail Flyers Medal of Honor
- Type: Civilian Medal
- Awarded for: acts of heroism or extraordinary achievement
- Country: United States
- Presented by: Post Office Department
- Eligibility: Airmail Pilots
- Status: No longer awarded
- Established: February 14, 1931
- First award: December 13, 1933
- Final award: October 4, 1948

Highlights
- Total: 10
- Total awarded posthumously: 1

The Airmail Flyers' Medal of Honor is a United States decoration issued by the Post Office Department. The decoration was authorized by Act of the United States Congress, February 14, 1931, for presentation by the President of the United States, but not in the name of the Congress. The medal was intended to recognize any person who, while serving as a pilot in the airmail service, distinguished themselves by acts of heroism or extraordinary achievement. Retroactive to May 15, 1918, when the firsts continuously schedule public service airmail route was established between Washington, D.C., and New York City by way of Philadelphia. Recommendations for the individual awards would come from the Postmaster General and be sent to the President for his approval and presentation.

The medal was designed by Walker Kirtland Hancock, head of the sculptor department of the Pennsylvania Academy of Fine Arts, under the United States Commission of Fine Arts, of which Adolph Alexander Weinman was a member at the time. The medal was struck by the Philadelphia Mint.

== Description and Symbolism ==
=== Obverse ===
On the front of the 1 ¼ inch bronze medal is a figure of a nude male wearing an aviators leather helmet and goggles, trudging on tip toes atop a layer of clouds and in front of a single lightning bolt while clutching a sack of mail with both hands, to his right side. Around this scene and along the edges circumference are the words "AIR MAIL FLYERS'S MEDAL OF HONOR". Just below the shins of the male figure are the letters "WH" being the initials of the artist responsible for designing the medal.

=== Reverse ===
On the reverse side of the 1 ¼ inch bronze medal the entire edge circumference is decorated with a wreath of laurel leaves. Within the edged border of laurel leaves there is a blank space for engraving the recipients name. Above which are the three lines "PRESENTED / BY THE PRESIDENT / OF THE UNITED STATES". And below the blank space for the recipients name are the six lines "DISTINGUISHED SERVICE / AS AN AIR MAIL PILOT / AUTHORIZED / BY CONGRESS / FEBRUARY XIV / MCMXXI" with the two lines "authorized" and "by congress" being enclosed by a single set of stylized wings.

=== Ribbon ===
The ribbon to the Airmail Flyers' Medal of Honor is of heavy silk and divided into six equal vertical strips of Blue, White, Red, Blue, White, and Red, for the colors of the Post Office Department Air Mail Service.

== Authorization ==
[H.R. 101] [Public, No. 661.]

On 14 February 1931 Congress provided:

That the President is hereby authorized, under such rules and regulation as he may prescribe, to present, but not in the name of Congress, an air-mail flyer’s medal of honor, of appropriate design, with accompanying ribbon, to any person who, while serving as a pilot in the air mail service since May 15, 1918, had distinguished, or who, after the approval of this Act, distinguishes himself by heroism or extraordinary achievement while participating in such service: Provided, That no more than one air-mail flyers medal of honor shall be issued to any one person, but for each succeeding act or achievement sufficient to justify the award of an air-mail flyer’s medal by the President may award a suitable bar or other suitable device to be worn as he shall direct. In case an individual who distinguishes himself shall have died before the making of the award to which he may be entitled, the award may nevertheless be made and the medal or the bar or other device presented to such representative of the deceased as the President may designate, but no medal, bar, or other device herein-before authorized shall be awarded or presented to any individual whose entire service subsequent to the time he distinguishes himself has not been honorable.

== Deauthorization ==
[Public Law No. 91-375]

When the Post Office reorganization act was signed into law, Public Law 91-375, by President Richard Nixon on August 12, 1970, the legislation did not carry forward the authority of the new USPS to award the decoration. By this action, or lack of action, it was considered repealed and no longer existed.

== Recipients ==
- Mal Bryan Freeburg (Awarded 12/13/1933)
- Edward Antoine Bellande "Eddie"(Awarded 10/29/35)
- James Henry Carmichael Jr. "Slim"(Awarded 10/29/35)
- Gordon Sprigg Darnell (Awarded 10/29/35)
- Wellington P. McFail (Awarded 10/29/35)
- Lewis Summers Turner (Awarded 10/29/35)
- Grover Clinton Tyler (Awarded 10/29/35)
- Roy Herbert Warner (Awarded 10/29/35)
- Theodore Nieman Kincannon "Ted"(*) (Awarded 4/12/37)
- John David Hissong (**) (Awarded 10/4/48)

(*) Awarded Posthumously. (**) Presented by Postmaster General Jesse M. Donaldson, on behalf of President Truman.

== Citations ==
=== Mal Bryan Freeburg ===
Mal Freeburg, flying for Northwest Airways at time of presentation, was cited as follows:

On April 12, Pilot Freeburg, with co-pilot Joe Kimm, departed from St. Paul, Minnesota, at 3 p.m. en route to Chicago. The plane carried eight passengers, six men and two women, besides a load of mail. The plane made its regular stop at Minneapolis at 3:09 p.m. and left at 3:15 p.m. en route to Chicago via Milwaukee. Approximately 45 minutes later, while flying at an altitude of about 2,000 feet in ideal weather, with everything functioning perfectly, the pilot suddenly experienced a terrific jolt. A glance showed that the left outboard motor was vibrating terribly, due to a portion of the propeller having let go. While in the act of cutting the switch, the motor broke loose from its mounting and the pilot, not knowing for the moment what its effect would be on the other motors, cut all the switches and then investigated further. He found that the motor had lodged on the left landing gear struts. Again Freeburg switched on the other two motors and still had an altitude of about 1800 feet. The plane was operating very well considering the additional resistance caused by the motor shell still being in place with a large opening remaining, due to the loss of the motor.

Pilot Freeburg stated that his next thought was to get rid of the motor, but as he was flying over a farming district he was apprehensive that it might land on a dwelling. As a result, the course was altered and the ship pointed its nose over the Mississippi River. Freeburg intended to shake the motor off the landing gear and drop it into the river, if possible. On approaching a fair sized island in the river he succeeded in maneuvering the plane so that the motor fell off. The pilot then turned the plane around and proceeded to the Wabasha emergency landing field, about 235 miles east. The damage to the landing wheel was such that the wheel would not revolve and the tier was cut open. But a safe landing was made without any further damage.

The incident had already been reported to the operating headquarters at St. Paul by radio at the time of occurrence and a relief ship was immediately dispatched to Wabasha where pilots Freeburg and Kimm transferred their passengers and mail and continued the trip to Chicago.

One of the distinguished features of this occurrence is the fact that during all of this time, Pilot Freeburg was talking into his radio phone, advising St. Paul of what had happened and outlining what he was attempting to do.

(Because there was only a short delay in the flight, it was not recorded as an interrupted flight.)

=== Edward Antoine Bellande ===
Edward Antoine Bellande, flying for United Airlines at time of presentation, was cited as follows:

For extraordinary achievement while piloting air mail plane No. NC 9666 on a flight from San Francisco to Los Angeles, California, on the night of February 10, 1933. About 17 miles from Bakersfield, Calififornia, fire started in the plywood floor between passenger seats five and six. Co-pilot Lynn Berkenkamp made every effort to extinguish the flames and succeeded in keeping them from the cabin by using cushions from the chairs. In the meantime, Pilot Bellande speeded the plane to the Bakersfield Airport and landed it as soon as possible. After the landing the pilot and co-pilot gave immediate attention to the safety of the passengers. Six were removed without injury and the seventh and last was slightly burned. The plane was completely destroyed but most of the mail was saved.

=== James Henry Carmichael, Jr. ===
James Henry Carmichael, Jr., flying for Central Airlines at time of presentation, was cited as follows:

For extraordinary achievement while piloting air mail plane No. 408H on April 21, 1933, during a night flight from Washington, D.C., to Detroit, Michigan. At an altitude of 3200 feet and about halfway to Pittsburgh, Pennsylvania, with no warning whatsoever the left outboard engine of the tri-motored plane crashed from the ship. Pilot Carmichael adjusted the controls to return the plane to a level position and turned back to Washington. In breaking from the ship the left engine had pulled the outboard heater control open and effected the center engine altitude adjustment. The center engine cut out until the altitude control was discovered and readjusted. Realizing that he had about 100 miles to fly in returning to Washington, the pilot climbed to an altitude of 4500 feet in order not to overheat the remaining two engines on the plane. A survey of the damage was made from the cockpit window with the aid of a flashlight, from which it was determined that the landing gear had been damaged. The pilot, therefore, decided that a landing should be made at Bolling Field, which is larger than the Washington Airport, and would be more advantageous for the one-wheel type of landing which would have to be made with damaged landing gear. He also desired to avail himself of the trained Army personnel and their emergency equipment, including ambulances and fire trucks. The pilot made all arrangements for landing by radio communication and received the fullest cooperation from the Bolling Field authorities. A one-wheel landing was made with little additional damage to the ship and no injury to passengers and mail.

=== Gordon Sprigg Darnell ===
Gordon Sprigg Darnell, flying for Braniff Airlines at time of presentation, was cited as follows:

For extraordinary achievement while piloting air mail plane No.e NC 9489 on a flight from Kansas City, Missouri, To Denver, Colorado, on June 28, 1933. Near Goodland, Kansas, at an altitude of about 2,000 feet, Pilot Darnell smelled gasoline fumes. Fire followed immediately, breaking through the lower left side of the cockpit. The throttle, switch and right hand tank were closed, but the left hand tank valve could not be closed because it was in flames. The flame in the cockpit was smothered by a hand extinguisher. Fumes almost rendered the pilot and passengers unconscious, but the pilot opened the cockpit windows and put the ship in a nose-high side slip, which partly cleared the fumes and kept most of the flames from the cockpit. A normal landing was made but fire flamed again in the cockpit before the ship came to a stop. Passengers were notified to prepare to leave the plane. Pilot Darnell climbed through the front exit and rode the wing struts until the plane stopped. Passengers were removed without injury. All mail except that in the cockpit was saved. The left gas tank burned out and the right exploded. The plane was a complete loss.

=== Wellington Porter McFail ===
Wellington Porter McFail, flying for American Airlines at time of presentation, was cited as follows:

For extraordinary achievement while piloting air mail plane No. NC 12285 on a flight from Texarkana to Dallas, Texas, on the afternoon of December 6, 1933. Pilot McFail left Texarkana at 1:10 p.m. and shortly after 1:50 p.m., while flying at an altitude of 5900 feet, a slight motor vibration was noted, followed later by a rending crash and jar, as the motor ripped loose from the plane. Pilot McFail's head and body were forced to his knees as the plane was immediately whipped up in a vertical climb to about 6500 feet as a result of the loss of the weight of the motor. He could not open his eyes for the moment but on regaining muscular control he noted the plane had reached the peak of its climb and was falling off to the right. It went into a half turn with tail down and right wing pointed down. The pilot felt pressure on the controls and righted the ship into a dive. He unbuckled his belt to jump but realizing that he had some control over the plane he decided that he could land it with a good chance of not hurting the ship or himself. He remembered that there was an emergency landing field in the vicinity and re-buckled his belt, determined to land the plane in the field if possible. Relying on his experience with a glider, he maneuvered a figure S and brought the plane to a landing, without further damage to the plane or to himself and with no damage to the mail.

=== Lewis Summers Turner ===
Lewis Summers Turner, flying for Bowen Airlines at time of presentation, was cited as follows:

For extraordinary achievement while piloting air mail plane No. NC 732 N on a flight from Fort Worth to Amarillo, Texas, on the night of March 16, 1933. On the take-off from Fort Worth, while at an altitude of approximately 150 feet, the plane burst into flames and was almost instantly a mass of fire from propeller to rudder. Pilot Turner turned abruptly down wind to avoid landing on houses and other obstructions and landed at the airport from which he took off. The heat in the cabin was so intense the passengers leaped from the plane immediately after it landed and before it came to a stop. Although burned and injured both were saved. Pilot Turner did not leave the plane until after it had stopped. He attempted to make an exit from the top door of the cockpit but was prevented from doing so by flames. Although the wings were burning he jumped through the side door of the cockpit. His hands, forehead and ears were burned and his ankle sprained from the jump. He immediately turned his attention to the passengers until he saw that they had jumped. Most of the mail was recovered and salvaged.

=== Grover Clinton Tyler ===
Grover Clinton Tyler, flying for United Airlines at time of presentation, was cited as follows:

For extraordinary achievement while piloting air mail plane No. C-741 on the night of March 2, 1931, on a flight from Seattle, Washington, to San Diego, California, when about nine miles south of Glide, Oregon, about 11 p.m., Pilot Tyler discovered that smoke was coming from the underside of the plane in the vicinity of the mail compartment. The smoke was almost immediately followed by flames. The plane at the time was over a mountainous region and the nearest clearing the pilot remembered was in the vicinity of Glide. He returned to it and landed the plane in a clump of small pliant trees. The wings were caught by the trees and were torn from the body of the plane. This served to break the force of the landing so that the passengers were not seriously injured. One passenger received a few cuts about the face and another burned his hands slightly in handling a hot fire extinguisher. Pilot Tyler helped the passengers from the plane and with their assistance removed the mall load of 319 pounds from the plane. The burning pouches were thrown into the swampy ground which extinguished the fire and saved the mail except for charred edges and water damage. The fire in the mail compartment of the plane was then quenched with fire extinguishers and the water in the swampy area in which the plane landed.

=== Roy Herbert Warner ===
Roy H Warner, flying for United Airlines at time of presentation, was cited as follows:

For extraordinary achievement while piloting an air mail plane on the night of August 22, 1930, on a flight from Boise, Idaho, en route to Pasco, Washington. Near Baker, Oregon, while flying at an altitude of about 7500 feet, Pilot Warner felt gasoline spraying against his face and immediately headed for an emergency landing field. Realizing that if he throttled his motor a backfire might ignite the gasoline fumes, he attempted a steep power dive. The fumes came back into his face, however, causing nausea and strangulation, making a side slip necessary. When the landing lights flashed on the ground, he cut his motor to land and the plane burst into flames. With his trousers afire and his right hand burning from handling the "stick," Pilot Warner continued to control the plane, but when the fabric burned off the right wing the ship went into a spin and landed on one wing, bounced into the air and hit again right side up. Pilot Warner climbed out of the flame enveloped cockpit and jumped clear of the fire and smoke to get fresh air. Nearly suffocated and sick from nausea, Pilot Warner thought of the mail, returned to the burning plane, opened the door, removed and threw all of the mail to safety. He completed the task and ran from the ship only a few second before the gasoline tanks exploded.

=== Theodore Nieman Kincannon ===
Theodore "Ted" Nieman Kincannon, flying for American Airlines, was cited as follows:

For extraordinary achievement while piloting air mail plane No. NC-13767 on a flight from Oklahoma City, Oklahoma, to Dallas, Texas, on January 29, 1936. Despite the fact that the weather reports indicated that the trip could be made, Pilot Kincannon encountered snow and later icing conditions. Ice formation on the carburetor reduced engine efficiency, necessitating a forced landing. Reports of the passengers indicate that under these trying circumstances, Pilot Kincannond did not become excited. He flashed the electric sign warning all passengers to fasten their seat belts and selected the best available place for landing. Most of the reports indicate that Pilot Kincannon deliberately selected a small clump of trees which could be utilized to break the fall, and maneuvered the plane so that the shock of the landing was absorbed by the front end of the fuselage and the left wing, thus protecting the passengers and mail compartments even though it would endanger him in his location in the front cockpit where the impact would be greatest. None of the five passengers on the plane which was a single-motor type, was injured seriously. Pilot Kincannon, however, was fatally injured. (Award was received posthumously by his widow)

=== John David Hissong ===
John David Hissong, flying for Eastern Airlines at time of presentation, was cited s follows:

For extraordinary valor and achievement while piloting air mail plane No. NC 13735 on a flight from New Orleans to New York on the night of October 18, 1938. Soon after takeoff from the intermediate stop at Montgomery, Alabama, for flight to Atlanta, Georgia, extreme vibrations set up in the right engine and there was progressive failure of its component parts. Fire of intense heat from escaping gasoline and oil enveloped the engine and right wing and progressed toward the cabin. The engine burned from its fittings and dropped from the plane. The pilot, with great skill and courage, manipulated the controls to compensate for loss of engine and burning wing, kept the plane aloft until dwellings were cleared, and then landed in the darkness and without landing gear in such manner that, although the burning wing was sheared off by contact with a tree, there was no impact. The passengers were freed from the plane a few second before it was entirely consumed. Besides three members of the plane crew, there were eleven passengers who earnestly say that they are indebted for their lives to the courage of Pilot Hissong, who alone was injured by minor burns.
