= Edward Antoine Bellande =

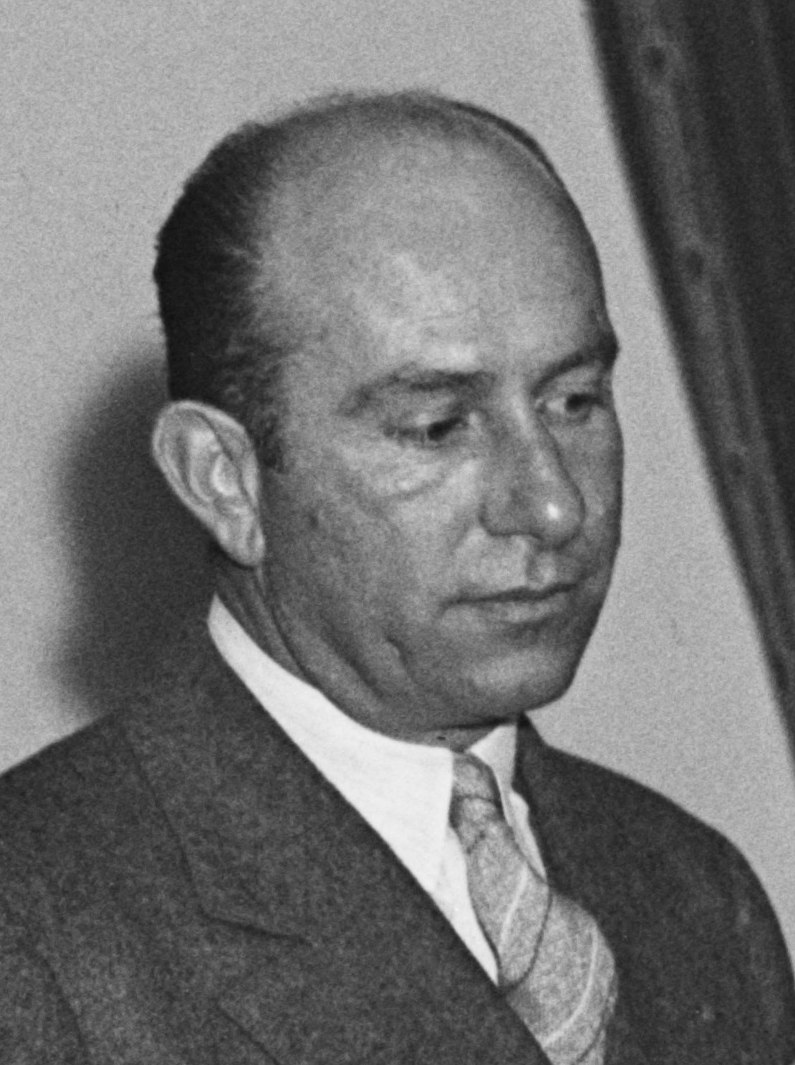
- Cropped image of Bellande waiting to receive Airmail Flyers' Medal of Honor from FDR.
- Born: December 19, 1897; Ocean Springs, Mississippi, U.S.
- Died: November 16, 1976; Los Angeles, California, U.S.
- Other names: "Eddie", "10,000 hour man"
- Occupation: Aviator
- Awards: Airmail Flyers' Medal of Honor (1933)

Signature
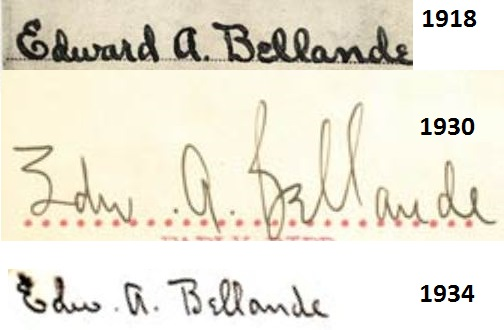

Edward A. Bellande (December 19, 1897 – November 16, 1976) was an American pioneer of aviation and aeronautics, WW1 navy pilot, barnstormer, skywriter, crop duster, movie stunt artist, motion picture airway liaison, early airline pilot, and one of only ten recipients of the Airmail Flyers' Medal of Honor.

He was the only child of Captain Antoine Victor Bellande and Mary Catchot. His father was 68 years old at the time of his birth.

== Education ==
After completing High School, in 1915, Eddie went to Buffalo, New York and spent three months at the Curtiss Exhibition company, owned by Glenn H. Curtiss, where he began the course in aviation. After completing the Curtiss course Eddie went to the Atlantic Coast Aeronautical Station at Newport News, Virginia. He was the youngest graduate, at age 18, of his class at the Aero Club of America when he received license #639. In September 1917 he went to the Georgia School of Technology in Atlanta, Georgia where he was an instructor in motors and planes at the government ground aviation school.

== World War I ==
During World War I, he served in the United States Marine Corps as a United States Naval Reserve aviator from August 18, 1918, until February 24, 1919. He was assigned to the Naval Training Center in Charleston, South Carolina and then as a naval flight instructor at the Pensacola Naval Air Station.

== Career ==
After the war Eddie went to work for the Curtiss Aircraft Company in Buffalo, New York, in the motor department in May 1920. In October Eddie moved to Cleveland, Ohio to work for Floyd J.Logan Aviation Company. In May 1921 Eddie performed aerial stunts at the 1921 opening of the aviation season for the Aero Club at Curtiss Field in Buffalo, New York. In June 1921 Eddie returned to California to work for one of the movie companies as an aviator. In 1924 Eddie was chartered by Cornelius Vanderbilt Jr., proprietor of The Illustrated Daily Herald to fly his staff photographer over the US Navy's Pacific Fleet as it was arriving in San Francisco. In 1925 he flew more than 50,000 miles in 797 hours bringing news reports to California, taking aerial photos.

Eddie went to work for Lockheed as a test pilot flying the new Lockheed Vega and later checked out Wiley Post in his New Lockheed Vega named "Winnie Mae" in 1926. He was the co-pilot for Charles Lindbergh on the first TWA transcontinental run on 8 July 1929 between LA and New York. Amelia Earhart was a passenger on one leg of the trip. Earhart had been hired by TAT (Transcontinental Air Transport) to help market the new service route. He helped organize Maddux Air Lines, which later evolved into TWA and sent him to Tucson, Arizona in November 1928.

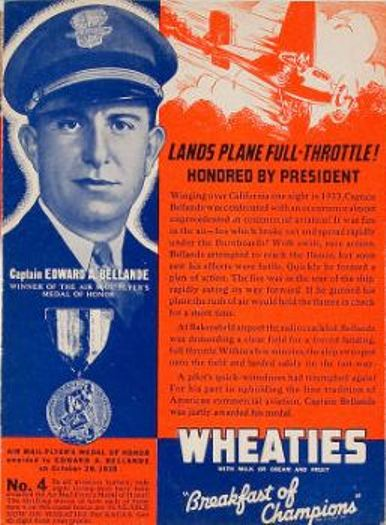
1937 era Wheaties cereal box cover #4 of 8 in the Airmail Flyers' Medal of Honor series.

=== Flight incident ===
On 10 February 1933 during a night flight from San Francisco to Los Angeles, California a routine flight took a turn for the worse. Just after passing over Delano at an altitude of about 2000 feet, co-pilot Berkenkamp was in the cabin speaking with a passenger when one of them saw smoke coming from a cabin heater vent. Berkenkamp immediately went forward to notified Pilot Bellande and then returned to the cabin to see what could be done. Edded turned for Bakersfield and "gave it the gun" increasing speed to suit the emergency. Berkenkamp kicked a hole in the floor to access fire, troubled by the ease at which the floor gave way indicating the fire was far worse than he had thought. Berkenkamp used the onboard fire extinguisher but the fire was too extensive. The quick thinking Berkenkamp then began using seat cushions to try and smother the fire but the fire would just break out in a different area. Eddie landed the plane at the Kern County Airport at full speed and brought it to a full stop using the breaks. Berkenkamp had the door open in a second and let the six passengers out. A Mrs Adalaid Helwig, of Berkeley, was the last passenger out and her clothes were smoldering badly. Fellow passengers were able to extinguish her clothing and she was rushed to San Joaquin Hospital in serious but not life-threatening condition. Other passengers on the plane were Paul Mertz of Wildwood, N.J., W.A. Trout of Los Angeles, Mrs A. J. Pyle of Southgate, Mrs. Jerry Roberts of San Francisco, and Mrs. W. D. Bush of San Francisco.

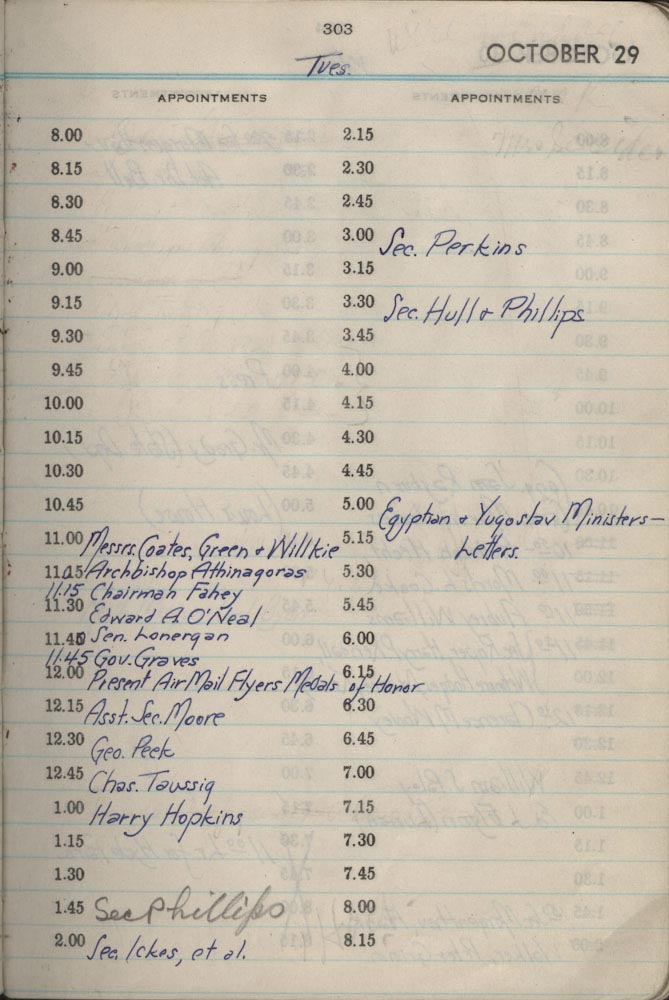
Daily appointment log for FDR showing appointment to present medal to 8 Airmail Flyers

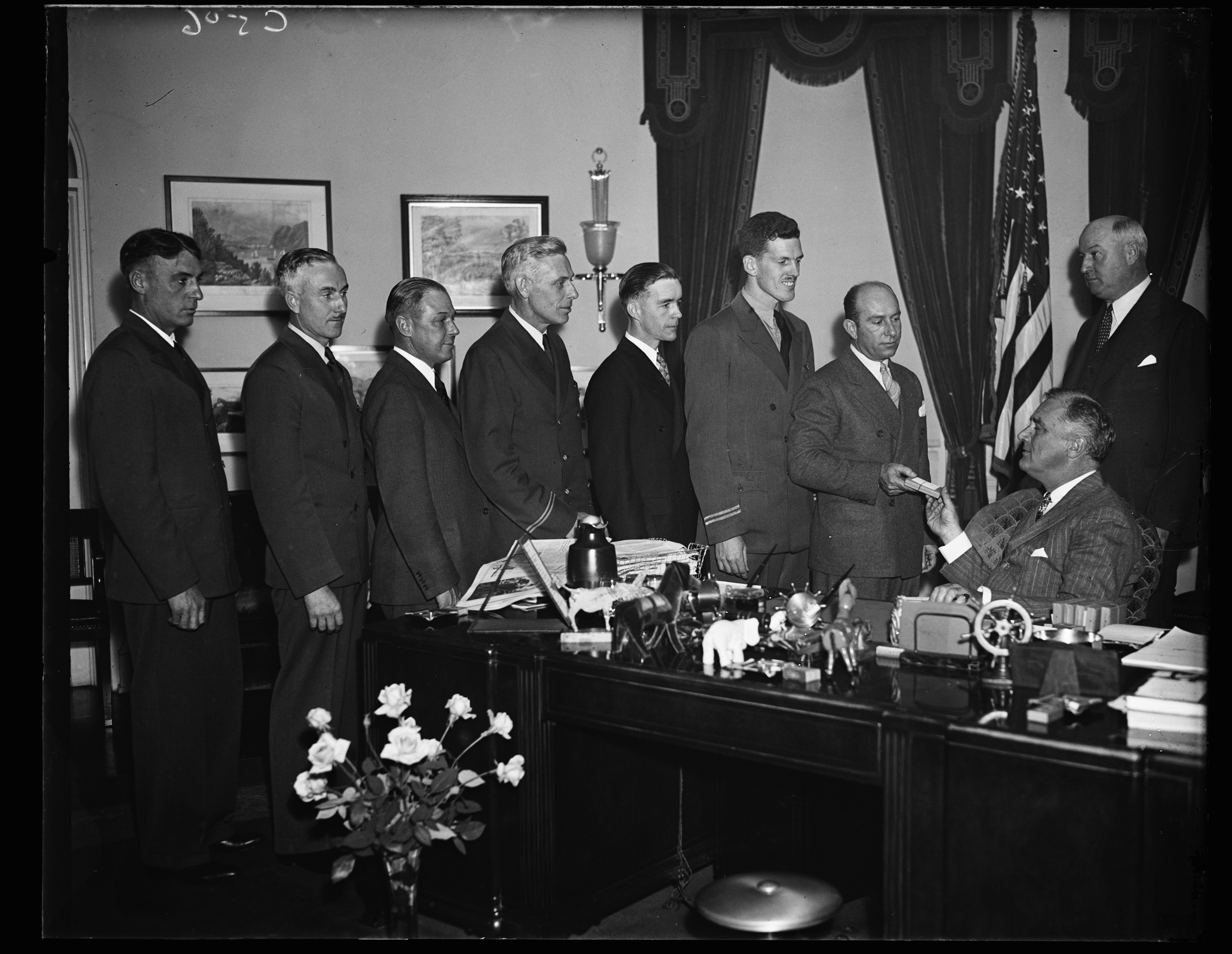
Roosevelt awards the Airmail Flyers Medal of Honor to 7 pilots, with Bellande being the first in line receiving the medal from the President.

== Medal from the President ==
29 October 1935 at a ceremony (12:00 – 12:15) in the White House Bellande was one of seven aviators awarded the Airmail Flyers’ Medal of Honor by president Franklin Delano Roosevelt for extraordinary achievement. All seven of the pilots saved the mail in hazardous landings.

Present at the ceremony were: President, Franklin Delano Roosevelt; Postmaster General, James A Farley; Lewis S Turner of Fort Worth, Texas; James H Carmichael, Jr. of Detroit, Michigan; Edward A Bellande of Los Angeles, California; Gordon S Darnell of Kansas City, Missouri; Willington P McFail of Murfreesboro, Tennessee; Roy H Warner of Portland, Oregon; And Grover Tyler of Seattle, Washington. Bellande's deed was chronicled on the well known Wheaties cereal box cover as part of a series of 8 box covers regarding the feats of pilot's awarded the Air Mail Flyers Medal of Honor.

=== Medal citation ===
For extraordinary achievement while piloting air mail plane No. NC 9666 on a flight from San Francisco to Los angeles, California, on the night of February 10, 1933. About 17 miles from Bakersfield, California, fire started in the plywood floor between passenger seats five and six. Co-pilot Lynn Berkenkamp made every effort to extinguish the flames and succeeded in keeping them from the cabin by using cushions from the chairs. In the meantime, Pilot Bellande speeded the plane to the Bakersfield Airport and landed it as soon as possible. After the landing the pilot and co-pilot gave immediate attention to the safety of the passengers. Six were removed without injury and the seventh and last was slightly burned. The plane was completely destroyed but most of the mail was saved.

== Personal life ==
In 1934 he move into an apartment next door to May West and his nickname "The 10,000 hour man" changed to "The guy that lives next to May West".

On 30 March 1937 Eddie married actress Molly Lamont settling down in Los Angeles (Brentwood) California. Not long after they wed Molly went for her first airplane ride, with Eddie on one of his TWA flights, rather than be separated from her new hubby.

=== Final years ===
Eddie retired from TWA in January 1943 as their number two pilot with more than 23,000 hours of flight time and 3,100,000 miles traveled without injury to a passenger or mail cargo. He joined the Garrett Corporation in 1943 where he was as an assistant to the president, elected to the board in 1948, and named chairman of the board in 1963. During the war Garrett worked on the pressurization of production aircraft which led to the B-29 Superfortress. After WWII the company shifted to civilian transport and spacecraft. He retired from Garrett in December 1965. Eddie died in the Century City Hospital on November 17, 1976, at the age of 78.
