= 1940s in air cargo =

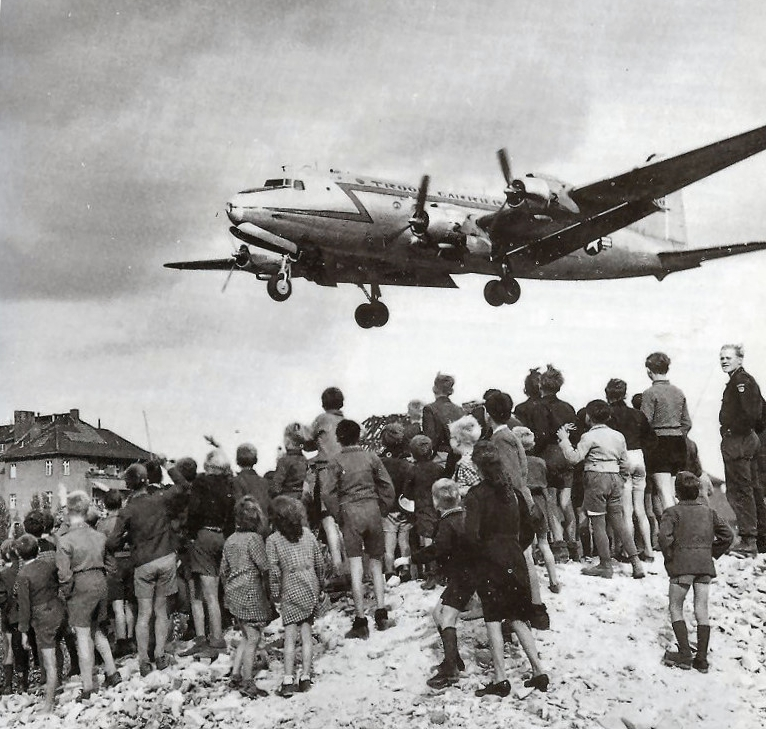
Berlin Airlift. Berliners watching a C-54 land at Berlin Tempelhof Airport, 1948.

This is a list of air cargo, airmail and airlift related events as well as a summary from the decade 1940–1949.

== Overview ==
=== Civil developments ===
The World War II years were highly disruptive for commercial airline activity, be it passenger, mail or freight business. In the end though, the period proved to have been a major accelerator for especially the air freight business after the war.

In the United States, air express service from the U.S. to Europe was delayed until 1941. The U.S. airlines were deeply integrated into the war effort, which dramatically expanded air transport capability and laid foundations for postwar commercial air cargo and airline growth. Upon U.S. entry into the war in December 1941, major carriers such as Trans World Airlines (TWA), United, Eastern, and American Airlines transferred aircraft and crews to military control under the Army Air Forces' Air Transport Command (ATC) to transport troops, equipment, mail, and materiel globally, or they were chartered by either the ATC and the Naval Air Transport Service (NATS).

In Europe the war severely disrupted regular commercial flights as civilian aviation gave way to military transport and operations. Many European national airlines saw their fleets requisitioned or destroyed, and scheduled civil services largely ceased until the end of hostilities.

Across Asia and the Pacific, commercial aviation was heavily curtailed or redirected for military purposes during the war. In Japanese-occupied and wartime territories, national carriers such as Imperial Japanese Airways were placed under government control to serve military logistics and troop movements, with regular civil services largely suspended. At the same time the Allied Forces also made use of (former) airline crews and aircraft, for example in the South West Pacific Area with the Directorate of Air Transport (DAT) chartering and operating a group of civilian planes chartered to the Allied Air Forces from the Dutch East Indies (KNILM) and four Australian airlines (Ansett, Australian National Airways, Guinea Airways and Qantas.

==== Post-war ====
Worldwide, numerous airlines resumed or inaugurated passenger and mixed freight / mail services in 1946 as the war restrictions eased, bolstering global transport networks. Also, numerous aircraft as well as trained and experienced personnel became available for the restarting local economies. At the same time also the aviation industry in general had gained experience with long distance navigation and transport of personnel and materiel as never before (see Military Developments below also). Surplus military transport aircraft (C-47/DC-3, C-46 Commando) were widely repurposed for civilian freight, charter and contract mail/cargo operations in 1946, significantly expanding capacity for air cargo logistics across civil markets. The end of the war also stimulated multinational coordination in aviation, leading to the establishment of regulatory frameworks such as ICAO and early route agreements that shaped postwar international commercial and cargo flights.

The United States saw the rise of the all-cargo airlines after the war, often by WWII veterans.

In Europe, after 1945, carriers such as British Overseas Airways Corporation (BOAC) resumed international services; Heathrow Airport in London reopened for commercial traffic in 1946, quickly becoming a major hub for postwar international air traffic. Also many carriers were (founded and) chartered to assist in the Berlin Airlift.

In Asia and the Pacific wartime networks as used for example for flying the Hump contributed to postwar airline formation and re-establishment of routes. For example, in China, Civil Air Transport was established in 1946 to carry relief supplies and cargo and was staffed by personnel with military air transport experience. Also in Southeast Asia and the South West Pacific, commercial services re-emerged after the war.

=== Military developments ===
Airlift became a major strategic and tactical military tool. On the side of the European Axis powers, huge offensive airlifts initially supported the supported the German Blitzkrieg, but as the war progressed, the Axis airlifts were more and more needed to relief or evacuate the encircled armies. On the Allied side, under the Axis aggression, RAF Ferrying Command and USAAC Ferrying Command (later Air Transport Command) were set up to urgently deliver aircraft and materiel to the allies all over the world under the Lend-lease Act, needed for their defense. This was a huge organizational and operational effort, also aided by civilian airlines from a.o. the U.S., Australia and the Dutch East Indies, to meet worldwide military logistic demands for example by developing transatlantic and transpacific air routes which were only just pioneered in these days, set up support stations for refuelling and maintenance along the way, and conquering challenges like flying the Himalayas to establish the necessary air supply routes. As the war progressed, the Allied airlifts took on an offensive nature, supporting the logistics needed for counter attacks in the Atlantic as well as the Pacific theatres. The airlifts were a major push for worldwide military and civil air transport also after the war, as can be read as a conclusion on the page about Air Transport Command: Routes had been established to places where aircraft had been unheard of before the war. Airline personnel who had never left the United States before joining the military had become veterans of long over-water flights to the remotest regions of earth. and in the conclusion on Flying the Hump as quoted from commanding General Tunner: ...After the Hump, those of us who had developed an "expertise" in air transportation knew that we could fly anything anywhere anytime.

==== Post-war ====
Directly after the war, United States air transport units participated in operations to repatriate personnel and return equipment (Operation Magic Carpet), contributing to global demobilization and early postwar logistics. Although sea transport carried the majority of returning troops, military air transport played a notable role in moving high-priority personnel and material during this period. In Europe military air transport units shifted toward occupation support and intra-theater movement of personnel and material. For example, U.S. troop carrier units like the 51st Troop Carrier Wing were reassigned to carry cargo and passengers within the United Kingdom and continental Europe, serving occupation forces and facilitating postwar reorganization. In Asia and the Pacific Allied air transport assets facilitated occupation duties, repatriation of prisoners, and supply movements in formerly contested regions. Airfields and airlift routes developed during the war continued to serve as foundations for postwar military and civil aviation in the region.

A notable immediate postwar event demonstrating the strategic utility of air cargo was the Berlin Airlift (1948–49), in which Western Allied forces flew more than two million tons of supplies into blockaded West Berlin solely by air.

== Events ==
=== 1940s ===
- Undated – (United States) American Airlines was the world's first airline to set up its own airline-operated cargo handling terminals. At Newark Airport, DC-4 freighters were loaded via a raised platform designed to allow direct transfer of freight between the aircraft and the terminal.

=== 1940 ===
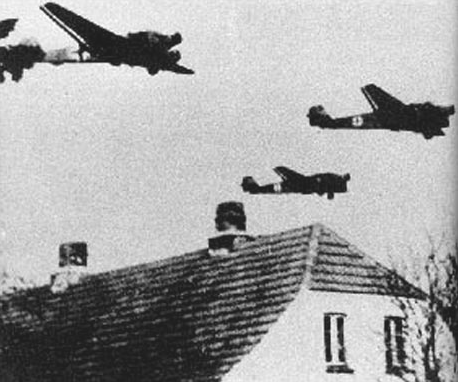
Weserübung-Süd – German Junkers Ju-52 transport aircraft over Denmark, April 9, 1940.

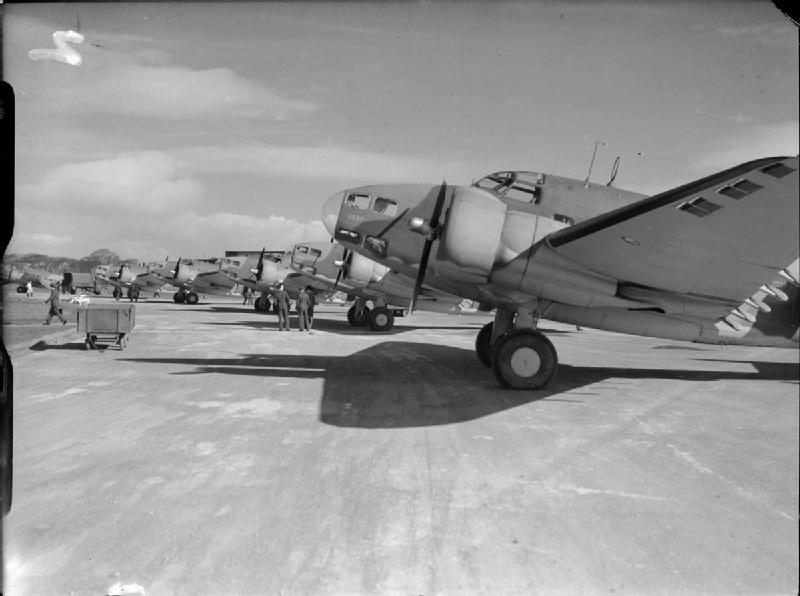
Royal Air Force Ferry Command – Lockheed Hudsons lined up at Gander, Newfoundland, Canada, prior to being flown across the Atlantic, direct to Prestwick, Ayrshire. Date between 1939 and 1945

- April 1 – (United Kingdom) British Overseas Airways Corporation (BOAC), created in 1939, began operating as a single national airline.
- April 9 – June 10 – (Germany / Denmark, Norway) During Operation Weserübung the Luftwaffe deployed 200 Junkers Ju 52 transports to airlift occupying forces and Fallschirmjäger paratroops; 86 transports are lost. This is the world's first airdrop of infantry in combat.
- May 10–28 – (Germany / Netherlands, Belgium) During Operation Gelb the Luftwaffe deployed 487 transport aircraft and 50 glider aircraft to airlift occupying forces to the Netherlands and Belgium in the first face towards occupation of France. In the Netherlands alone, 125 Ju 52 transport aircraft were destroyed and 47 were damaged. The so-called "silent" surprise attack on Fort Eben-Emael near Liege, Belgium with nine Ju 52 towed DFS 230 gliders also marked the world's first use of gliders for transport of troops and materiel in combat.
- June 20 – (United States) Pan Am starts the U.S. Post Office's Foreign Airmail route FAM-20 between Fairbanks and Seattle connecting Alaska to the other states by airmail.
- July-October – (United Kingdom - United States) British Overseas Airways Corporation (BOAC), during the Battle of Britain and also to prove German claims of an aerial blockade were false, performed a series of transatlantic courier/mail services to LaGuardia, utilizing camouflaged Short S.30 flying boats "Clare" and "Clyde". The aircraft carried mail and on each flight the latest British newspapers.
- November 10 – (United States-United Kingdom) With France fallen and Atlantic shipping threatened, the Allies set up organised air ferrying of U.S. and Canadian built aircraft and urgent materiel across the North Atlantic. On 10 November 1940 seven Lockheed Hudsons departed Gander, Canada in the first major ferry operation of what would later become RAF Ferry Command; this "air ferry" system became a cornerstone of wartime aircraft/materiel transfer from the U.S. to the U.K.
- December 23 – (United States) United Airlines inaugurates the first U.S. all-cargo airline flight, flying DC-4s between Chicago and New York.

=== 1941 ===
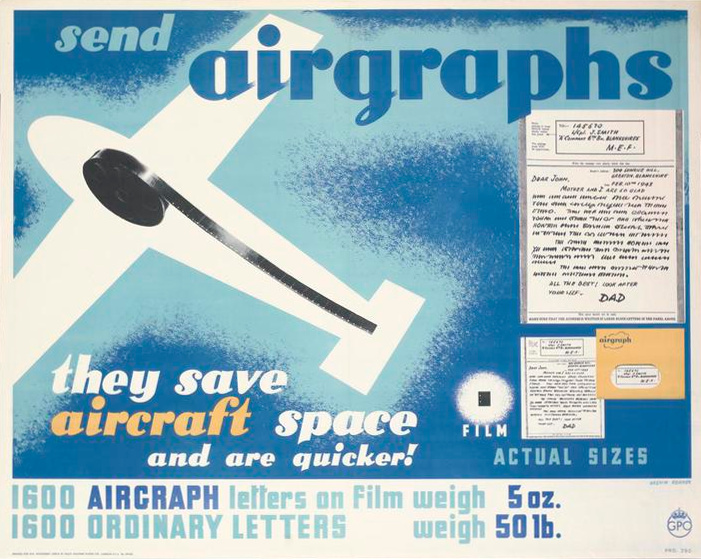
Send Airgraphs Art. Date between 1939 and 1945

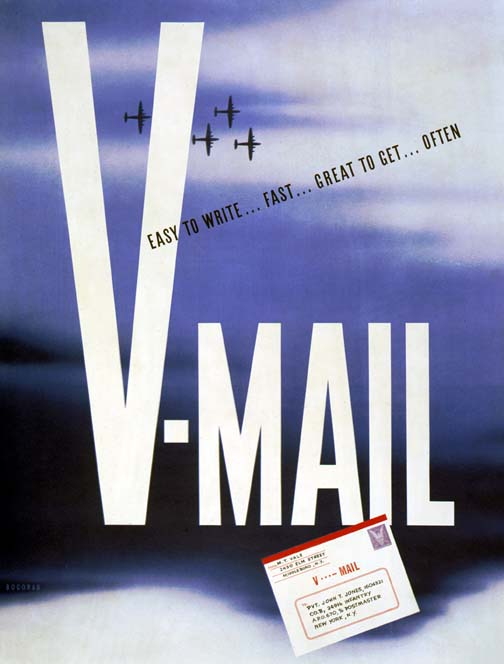
Propaganda poster produced by the U.S. government during World War II to promote the use of V-Mail.

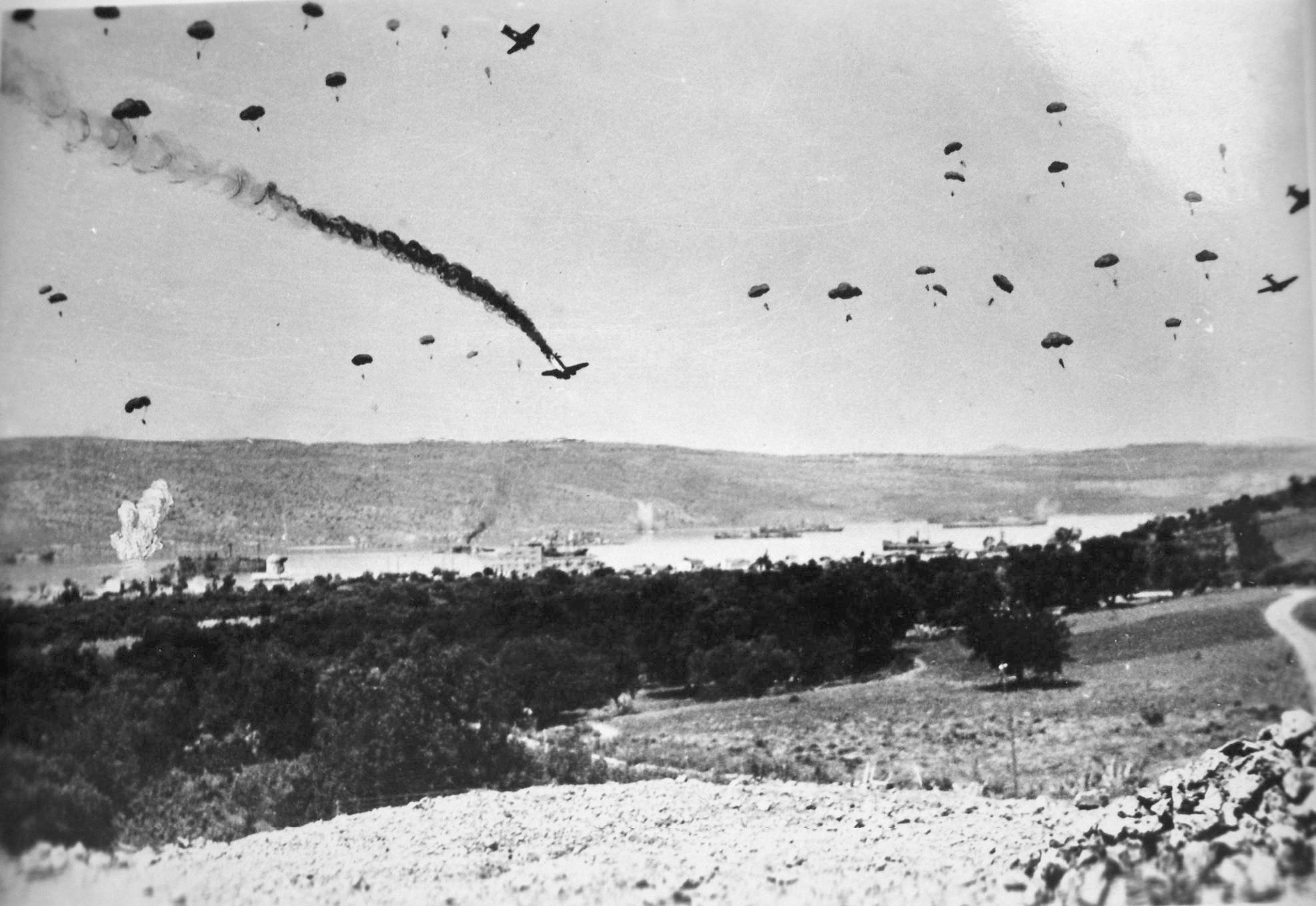
German paratroopers land in Crete, May 1941.

- March 11 – (United States) Lend-Lease Act passed – The Act was a policy under which the United States supplied the United Kingdom, the Soviet Union, France, the Republic of China, and other Allied nations of the Second World War with food, oil, and materiel (including aircraft) between 1941 and 1945. The aid was given free of charge on the basis that such help was essential for the defense of the United States. This increased the need for air ferrying and strategic air transport planning.
- April 21 – (United Kingdom) British Airgraph (microfilm mail) service begins from Cairo. To save aircraft cargo capacity and ship/plane space between the Middle East and Britain, the GPO/Kodak airgraph (later analogous to U.S. V-Mail) was introduced; the first shipments left Cairo in late April 1941 and arrived in Britain in May. This was a major wartime innovation that reduced weight and bulk of armed forces personnel mail.
- May 15 – (United States) During a parachute training flight in a Douglas R2D-1 over Kearny Mesa in San Diego, California, United States Marine Corps Second Lieutenant Walter S. Osipoff is pulled out of the aircraft by a cargo pack being dropped overboard and is left dangling in the plane's slipstream by a tangle of static lines. Seeing Osipoff's plight, United States Navy Lieutenant John Lowery and Aviation Chief Machinist's Mate John McCants take off from North Island in a Curtiss SOC-1 Seagull and rendezvous with the R2D. McCants grabs Osipoff at an altitude of 3,000 feet (910 meters) but finds it impossible to untangle him and lower him into the SOC's rear cockpit until the SOC accidentally bucks upward and its propeller saws off a small part of the R2D's tail cone and cuts the static lines. Both planes return safely, and the badly injured Osipoff eventually fully recovers. Lowery and McCants receive the Distinguished Flying Cross for the flight.
- May 20 – June 1 – (Germany / Greece) During the Battle of Crete multiple German airborne landings on Crete were performed, by means of an airlift with Junkers Ju 52 transport aircraft. The Greek island was seized by airborne assault, but cost the Luftwaffe 370 aircraft destroyed or damaged, including 271 of the Ju 52 transports.
- September – (United States - Portugal) Pan American Airways (Pan Am) instituted the first regular transatlantic air express service, connecting the U.S. to Lisbon.
- November 30 – (Italy) Mario de Bernardi flies air mail from Milan to Guidonia Montecelio, Italy, in a Caproni Campini N.1 motorjet-powered aircraft. It is the first time air mail is carried in any form of jet aircraft.
- December 13 – (United States) Pan Am signed a contract in which it would keep its Boeing 307 Stratoliners but sell the Boeing 314 Clippers to the U.S. government to fulfil military long range transport demand. On the entry of the United States into World War II, Pan Am continued operating its Stratoliners on routes to Central and South America, but under direction of the U.S. Army Air Forces' Air Transport Command.

=== 1942 ===
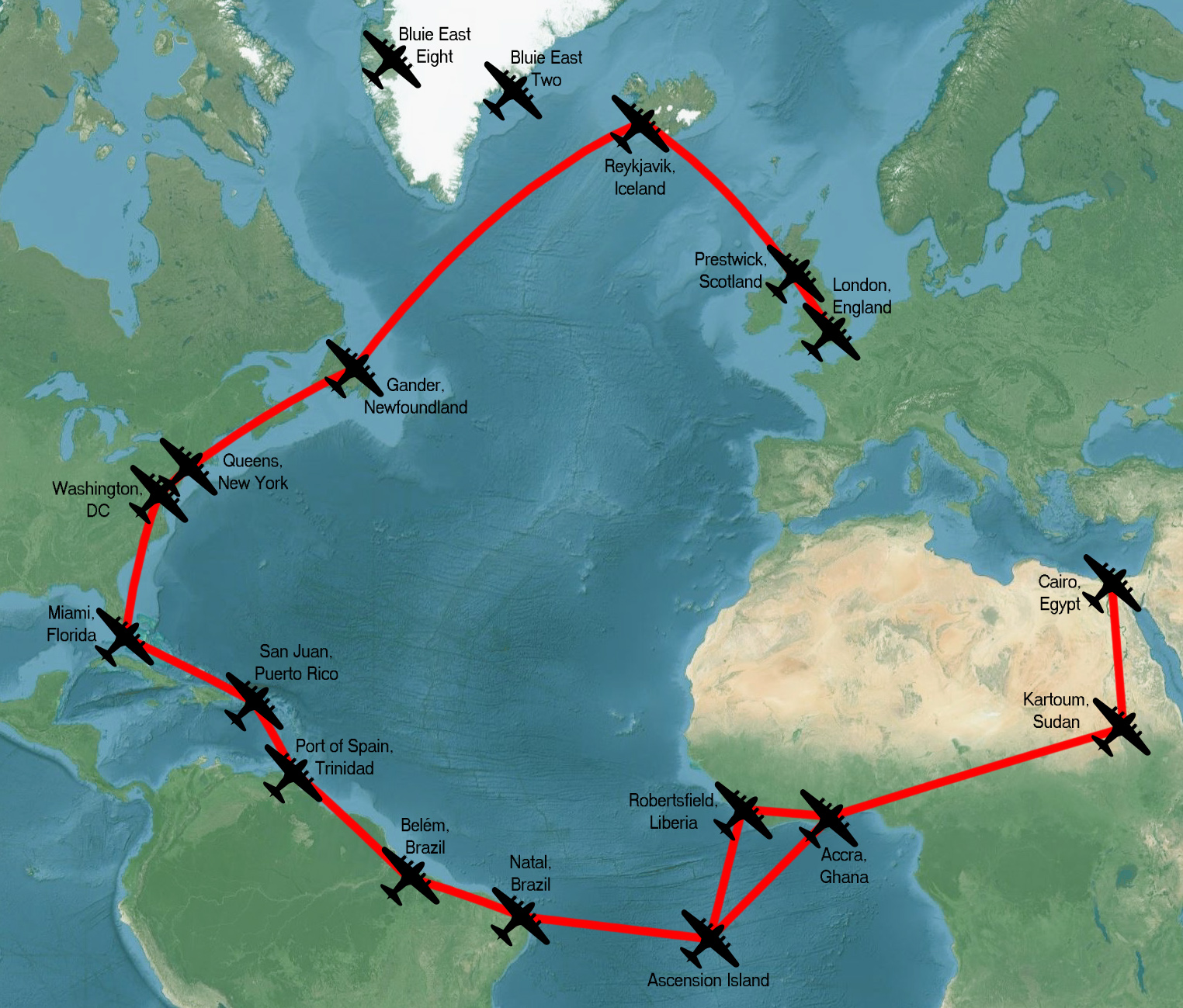
TWA ICD Boeing C-75 primary wartime transatlantic routes

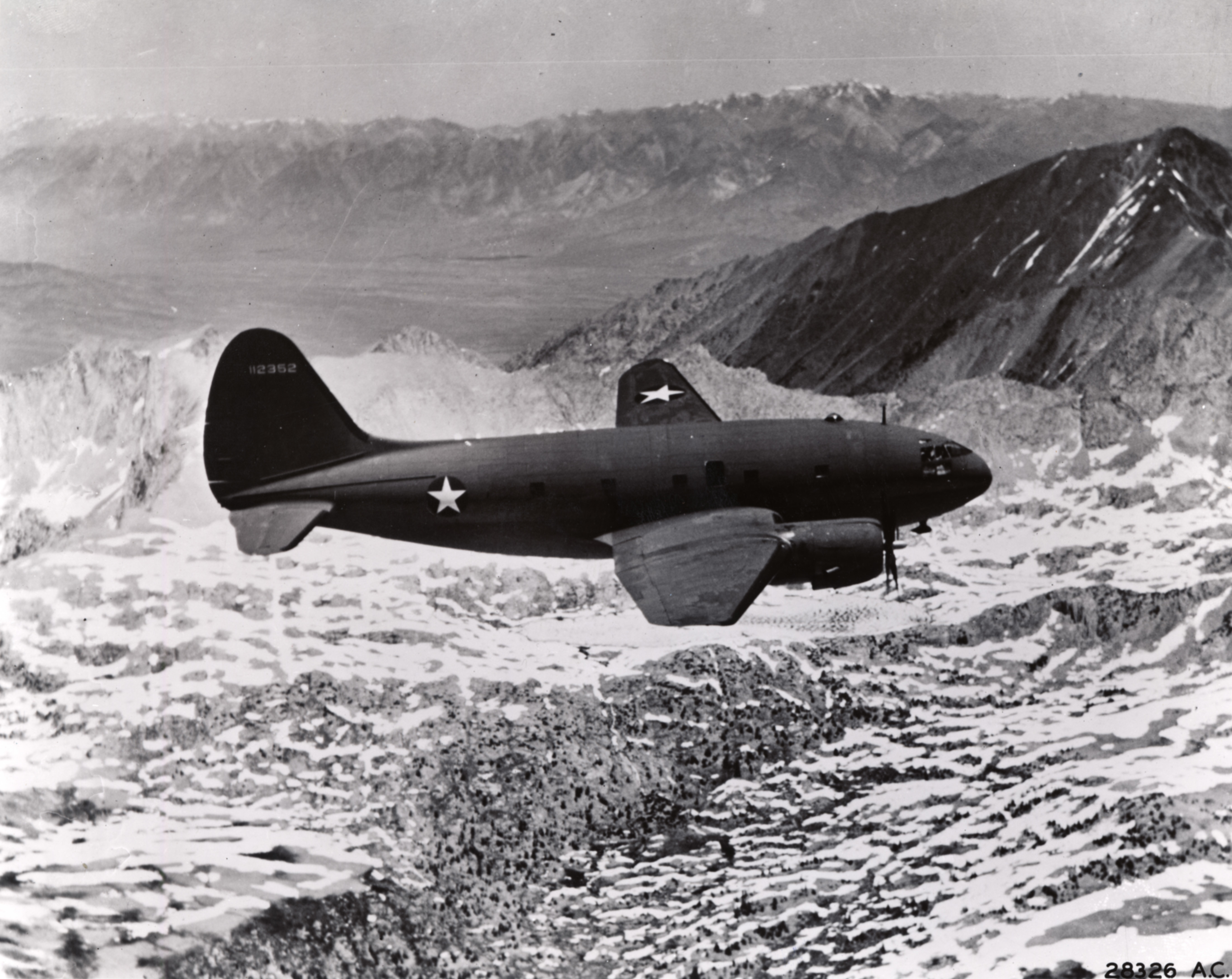
A C-46 flies over the Hump in 1944. The Curtiss C-46 Commando was considered the workhorse for flying over the "Hump". It was sturdy and could carry nearly double the cargo of a Douglas C-47 Skytrain. However, as a two-engine plane, if one failed, it lost 50% of its power, earning it the nickname "Ol' Dumbo". (taken from source)

- February 8 – April 21 – (Germany / USSR) The Germans used an airlift in successful relief of the Demyansk Pocket, albeit with the Luftwaffe suffering considerable losses to its fleet of transport planes: 266 Junkers Ju 52 transports (one-third of the Luftwaffe's Eastern Front strength). By May 1942, Luftflotte 1 had flown 14,455 air transport sorties into the pockets. A total of 24,303 tons of supplies and equipment, as well as 15,446 replacements, were flown into the pockets and 22,093 wounded were flown out.
- February 26 – (United States) First TWA Intercontinental Division (ICD) flight, with ex-TWA Boeing 307 Stratoliners now in USAAF service under the C-75 type designation, but manned by civilian TWA crews, beginning the transatlantic passenger and critical cargo aerial ferry service between North American and Europe. Three years later, the USAAF had amassed sufficient long-range transports that it no longer needed the C-75s, and they sold the fleet back to TWA.
- March 9 – (United States) The United States Army Air Forces are reorganized, with the separate Air Force Combat Command (the combat element) and United States Army Air Corps (the logistics and training element) discontinued. General Henry H. Arnold, formerly Chief of the Army Air Forces, becomes Commanding General of Army Air Forces. The term "Air Corps" survives until 1947, but only as a reference to the aviation branch of service of the United States Army without indicating any formal organization.
- April 8 – (United States / India-China) Flying the Hump. Because Japan had effectively blockaded the entry of fuel and supplies into China by 1940, pushing the Republic of China government further hinterland, and because also supply lines through the Soviet Union were blocked due to a Soviet-Japanese Neutrality Pact in 1941, only a Burmese road was left to supply China. An exploration into suitable air-routes over the dangerous Himalayas was done end of 1941, and the hazardous Himalayan route, over what was later known as The Hump, began operations in April 1942 — the first mission (8 Apr 1942) carried aviation gasoline to support operations tied to the Doolittle raid and Chinese forces. The Hump airlift evolved into one of the largest and most demanding wartime strategic airlift efforts, with unique navigation, weather and high-altitude performance challenges. The India-China ferrying operation was the largest and most extended strategic air bridge (in volume of cargo airlifted) in aviation history until it was surpassed in 1949 by the Berlin airlift, an operation commanded by the same General Tunner.
- May 22 – (United States) Pan American Airways introduced the world's first corrugated cardboard cartons for air cargo packaging, a measure that lowered the weight of certain consignments by up to forty percent and effectively enabled roughly one extra flight's worth of payload for every three services operated.
- August – (Latin America) Pan American Grace Airways (Panagra) introduced what is regarded as the first scheduled, commercial all-cargo service operated by an international airline under certification from the Civil Aeronautics Board. The service was inaugurated on Panagra's route between Balboa, Panama, and Lima, Peru, and, within approximately two and a half months, nearly 80,000 pounds of freight had been carried on the new operation.
- October – (United States) Air Transportation was founded in New York City in October 1942 by John F. Budd as the world's first air cargo magazine. The magazine was launched while America was in its tenth month of World War II, and the airfreight industry was in its infancy. A one-year subscription for the United States cost $5.
- November – February 1943 – (Germany / USSR) After the German 6th Army's encirclement and relief in the Demyansk pocket earlier in 1942, it was encircled again in the Battle of Stalingrad. Göring convinced Hitler to resupply the besieged forces by airlift until a relief effort could reach them. However the sheer scale of the effort required in Stalingrad – calculated at 750 tons per day – greatly exceeded the Luftwaffe's now-depleted capacities, when up against the now-strengthened Soviet Air Forces. The Stalingrad airlift effort ultimately failed to deliver sufficient supplies before the airfields were overrun by the Soviets, and the Germans estimated that they lost 488 transports, as well as 1,000 personnel. In spite of the airlift's obvious shortcomings, Hitler refused permission for the 6th Army to attempt a breakout. The remaining 300,000 German soldiers trapped in the city ran out of supplies and had to surrender in February 1943, after having lost 100,000 soldiers in combat between November 1942 and February 1943.

=== 1943 ===
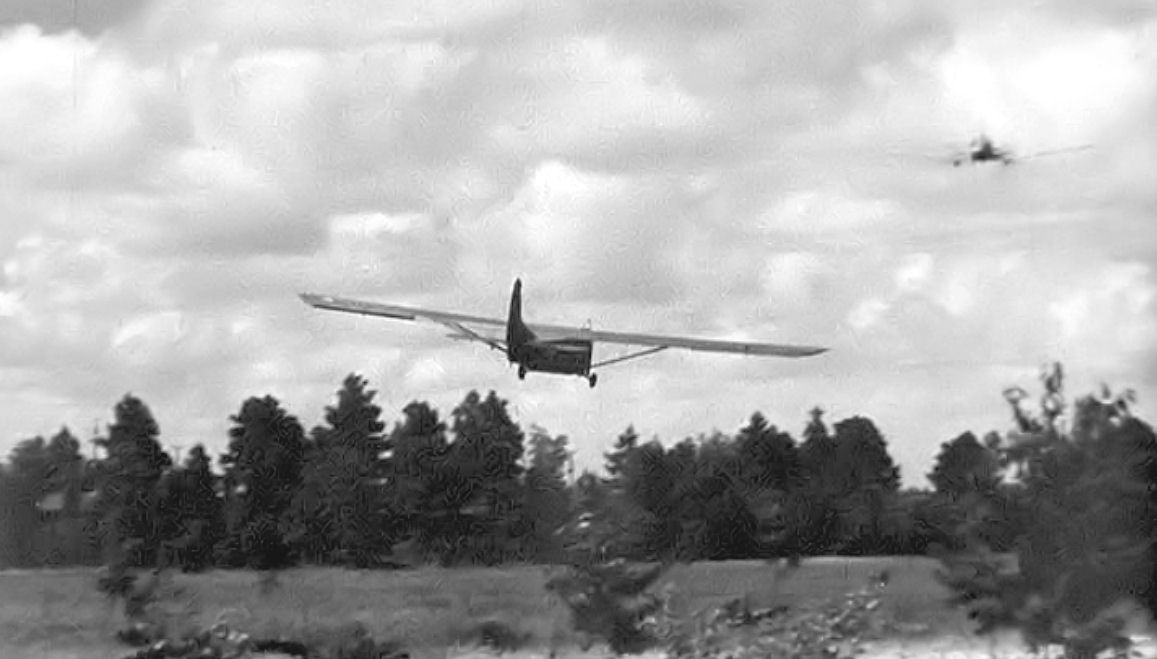
Waco CG-4 Glider taking off after snatch pick-up by a C-47 tow plane.

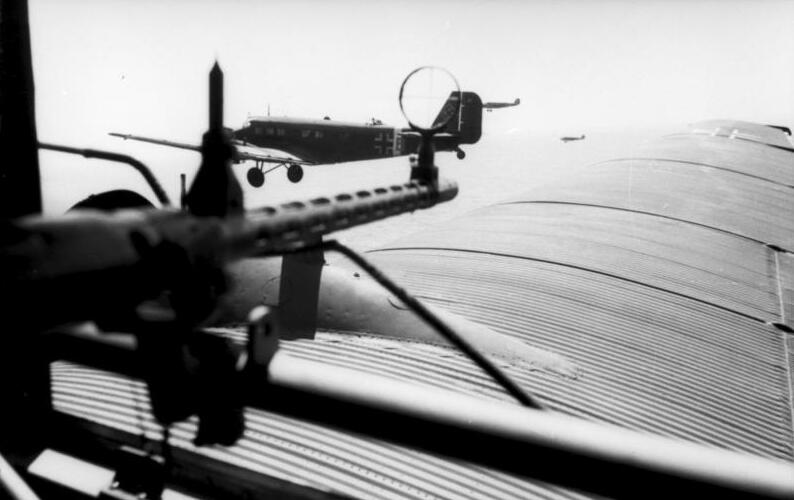
North Africa.- Junkers Ju 52 transport during flight, side window view with machine gun; PK XI. Fliegerkorps, January 1942 (illustrating 1943 operation Torch / operation Flax)

- Undated – (United States, Burma) After extensive testing, the first glider snatch pick-up under combat conditions is conducted by the 1st Air Commando Group (1ACG) in Burma. These pick-ups would be used in Far East and European operations to retrieve the relatively expensive gliders, but at the same time also sick and wounded soldiers could be evacuated in the gliders.
- February 9 – (United States) Shortly after takeoff from West Palm Beach, Florida, for a flight to North Africa via the Azores, a U.S. Army Air Forces C-87 Liberator Express cargo aircraft begins to experience severe vibration. The pilot turns around and attempts to fly to Miami, Florida, for an emergency landing, but 10 miles (16 km) short of Miami the vibration becomes so severe that he orders the crew to bail out over the Atlantic Ocean, where six of the eight men are later rescued. On automatic pilot, the unmanned C-87 then climbs to altitude, flies 1,300 miles (2,100 km) across Florida and the Gulf of Mexico to Zaragoza, Mexico, in 4½ hours, and circles over Zaragoza for two more hours before crashing into a mountain.
- April 5–27 – (Germany, Italy / Tunisia) After Allied naval pressure reduced Axis sea movement, Luftwaffe transports (Junkers Ju 52 and Messerschmitt Me 323) were used intensively to reinforce Tunisia and airlift supplies and equipment during/after Operation Torch; although initially a success (two missions a day were flown with hundreds of aircraft), heavy losses to the transport fleet occurred from Allied fighters when the Allies cut these supply lines during operation Flax.
- October 16 – (United States) United Airlines officially launched its dedicated air freight service, branded as Cargoliners. This service utilized modified Douglas DC-3 aircraft, the C-47 Skytrain military variant, to provide a coast-to-coast link between New York (Newark) and San Francisco.

=== 1944 ===
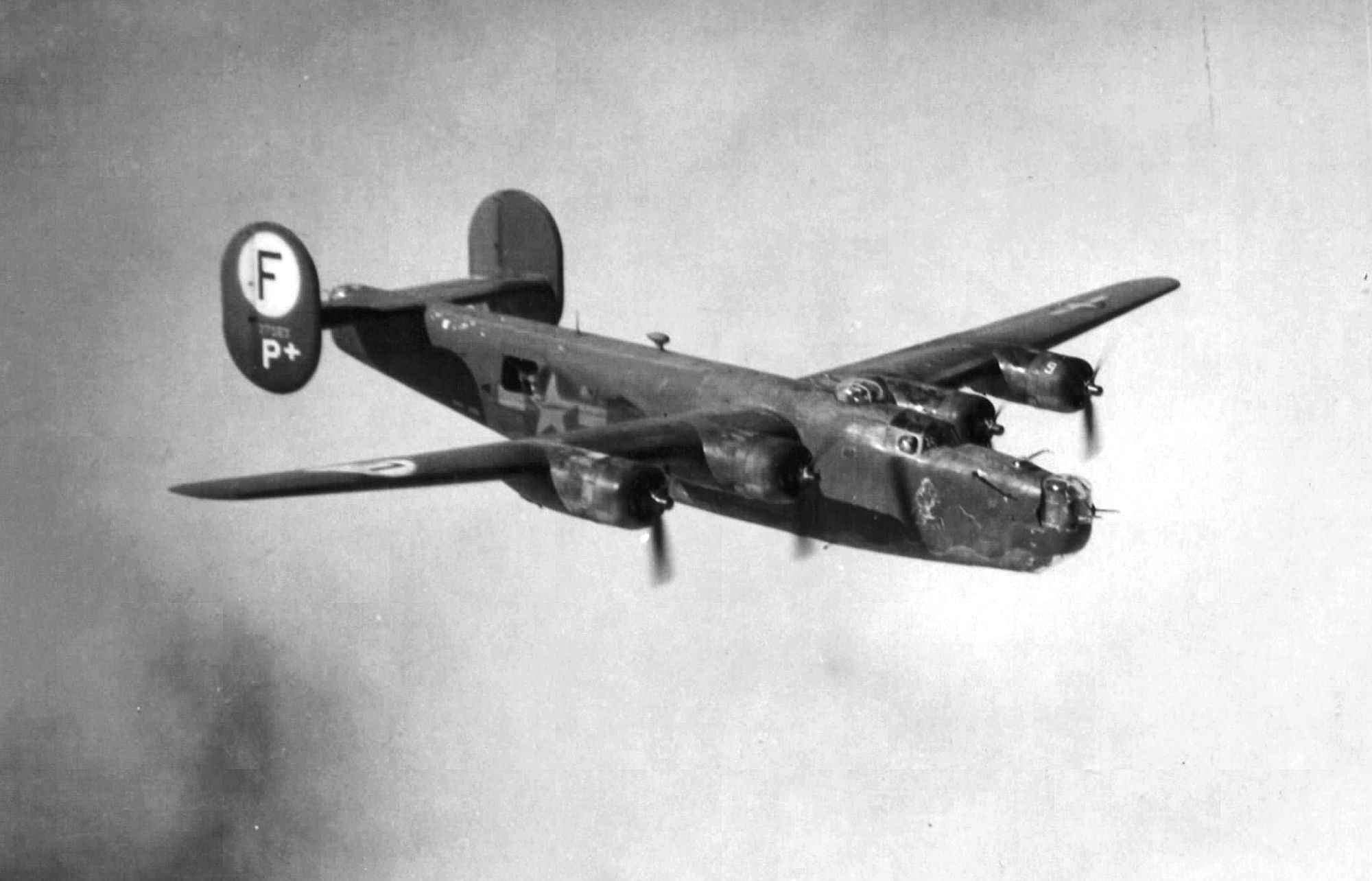
Ford B-24H-1-FO Liberator s/n 42-7563 701st BS, 445th BG, 8th AF Transferred to the 859th BS, 492nd BG in October 1944 and modified for use in Operation Carpetbagger missions. After August 1944 the 492nd Bomb Group was used as a cover for special operations missions in Europe, such as supply drops to Underground forces, agent insertions and propaganda leaflet drops, usually done at night.

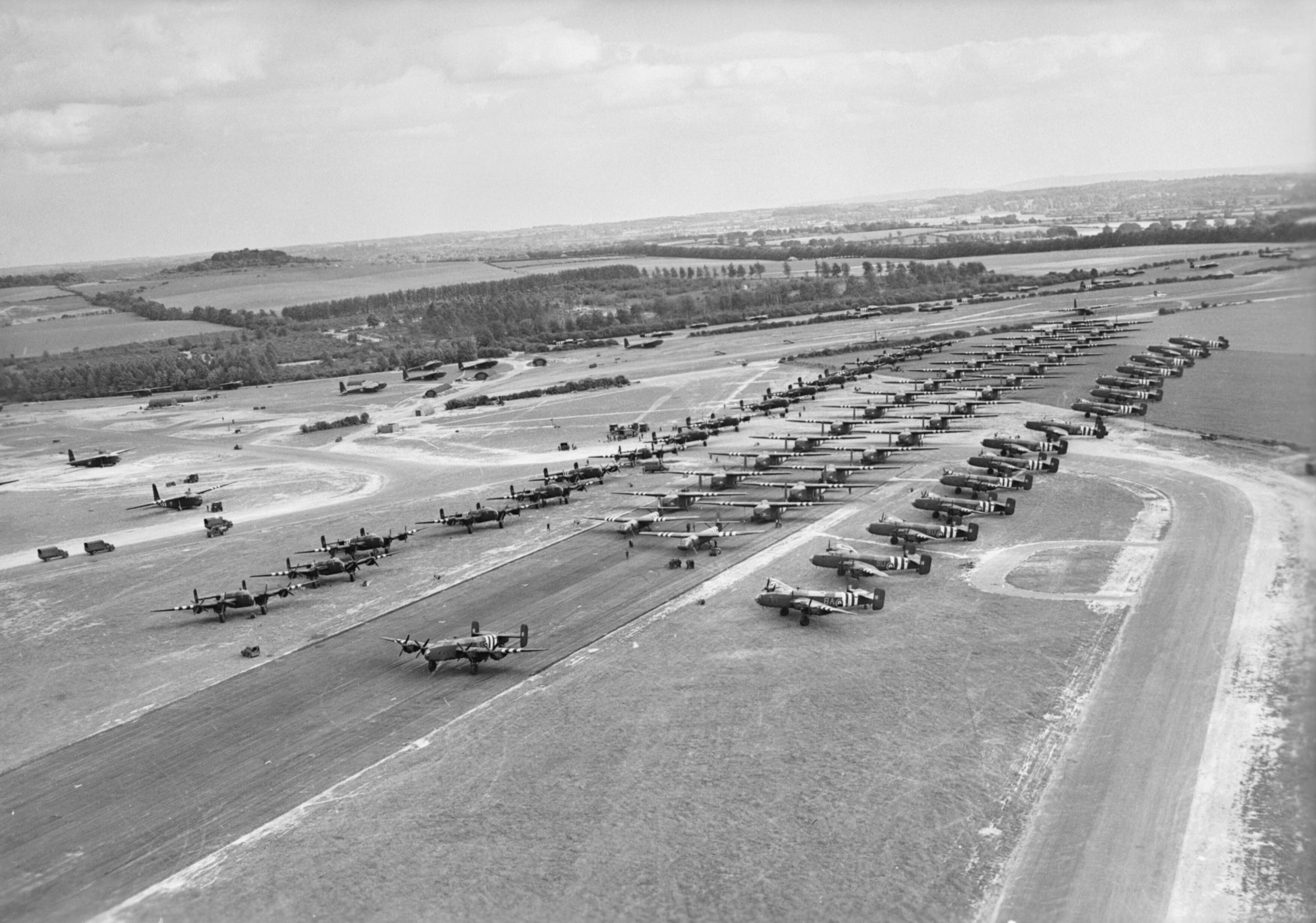
D-day – Part of the British 6th Airlanding Brigade, 6th Airborne Division, waiting to leave RAF Tarrant Rushton on the evening of 6 June 1944. On the runway are Hamilcar heavy gliders, preceded by two Horsa troop-carrying gliders, while parked on each side of them are Handley Page Halifax glider-tugs of Nos. 298 and 644 Squadrons RAF.

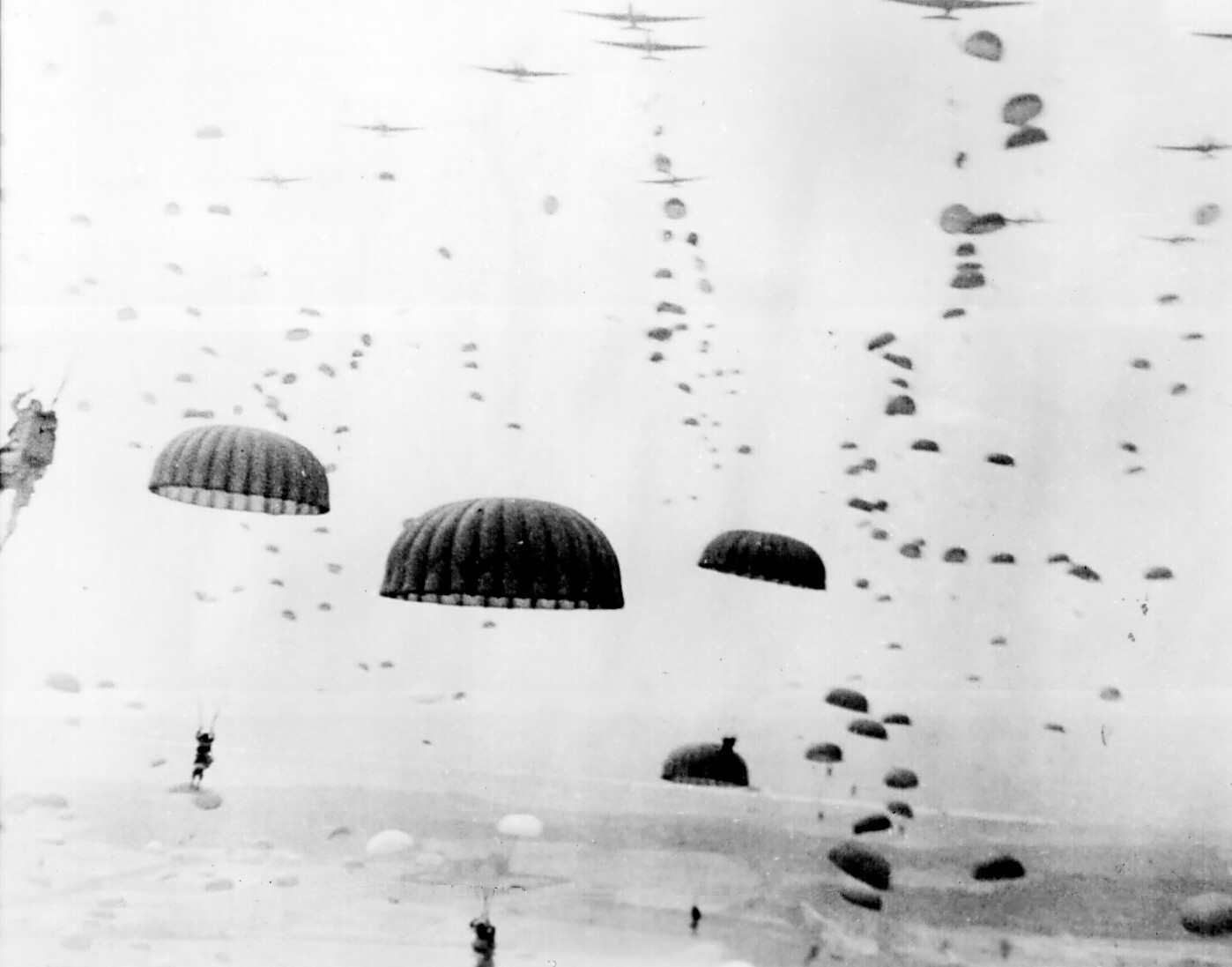
Operation Market Garden – Paratroopers open parachutes during the operations of the 1st Allied Airborne Army in the Netherlands, September 1944

- January – (Soviet Union) Soviet forces clear German forces from Leningrad's Shosseynaya Airport (the future Pulkovo Airport). The airport has been closed since 1941; it will resume cargo and mail flights in 1945 after its runways are repaired and scheduled passenger flights in February 1948.
- January 4 – (United States / Europe) Operation Carpetbagger was a World War II operation to provide aerial supply of weapons and other matériel to resistance fighters in occupied Europe by the U.S. Army Air Forces that began on 4 January 1944. From January 1944 to the end of the war, the Group, in liaison with the British Special Operations Executive and later the Special Forces Headquarters (SFHQ) in London, dropped spies and supplies to the resistance forces of France, Belgium, the Netherlands, Denmark and Norway.
- May 11 – (Germany) A Focke-Achgelis Fa 223 helicopter piloted by test pilot Karl Bode and Luftwaffe pilot Helmut Gerstenhauer begins operations to recover aa Dornier Do 217 which had crashed on the Vehner moor in Lower Saxony, between Osnabrück and Oldenburg, Germany, and another Fa 223 sent to retrieve the Do 217 which had crashed nearby before it could begin recovery operations. Bode and Gerstenhauer use a cargo net to recover all major components of both downed aircraft, providing the Luftwaffe with valuable experience in the possibility of using helicopters for transportation in mountainous areas.
- June – (United States) Flying in the Pacific and to Africa, Europe, South America, and parts of Asia, the U.S. Navy's Naval Air Transport Service (NATS)operates more than 200 planes and transports 22,500 passengers and 8.3 million pounds (3,764,855 kg) of cargo per month.
- June 6 – (France) D-Day, start of Operation Neptune, Operation Overlord. During the D-Day operations, roughly 27,000 troops were inserted behind German positions over a two-day period, transported either by powered aircraft or landed by more than 600 British and American gliders. The US 82nd and 101st Airborne Divisions were assigned to objectives west of Utah Beach, where they hoped to capture and control the few narrow causeways through terrain that had been intentionally flooded by the Germans. The British 6th Airborne Division, on the eastern flank, was assigned to capture intact the bridges over the Caen Canal and River Orne, destroy five bridges over the Dives 6 miles (9.7 km) to the east, and destroy the Merville Gun Battery overlooking Sword Beach. Free French paratroopers from the British SAS Brigade were assigned to objectives in Brittany from 5 June until August in Operations Dingson, Samwest, and Cooney.
- September 17–25 – (Netherlands) Operation Market Garden was an Allied military operation with the objective to objective to create a salient spanning 62 miles (100 km) into German territory with a bridgehead over the Nederrijn (Lower Rhine River), creating an Allied invasion route into northern Germany. This was to be achieved by two sub-operations: seizing nine bridges with combined American, British and Polish airborne forces ("Market") followed by British land forces swiftly following over the bridges ("Garden"). The airborne operation was undertaken by the First Allied Airborne Army with the land operation by the British Second Army, with XXX Corps moving up the centre supported by VIII and XII Corps on their flanks. The airlift / airdrop of paratroops and glider-borne troops numbering around 35,000–40,000 was the largest airborne military operation ever.
- October 15 – (United States) American Airlines launched the first sustained scheduled all-cargo air service in the U.S., utilizing Douglas DC-3 freighters, specially configured to carry bulk goods rather than passengers. The flight carried more than 6,000 pounds of cargo on its first trip from LaGuardia Field, New York City to Burbank, California and took approximately 19 hours to complete.

=== 1945 ===
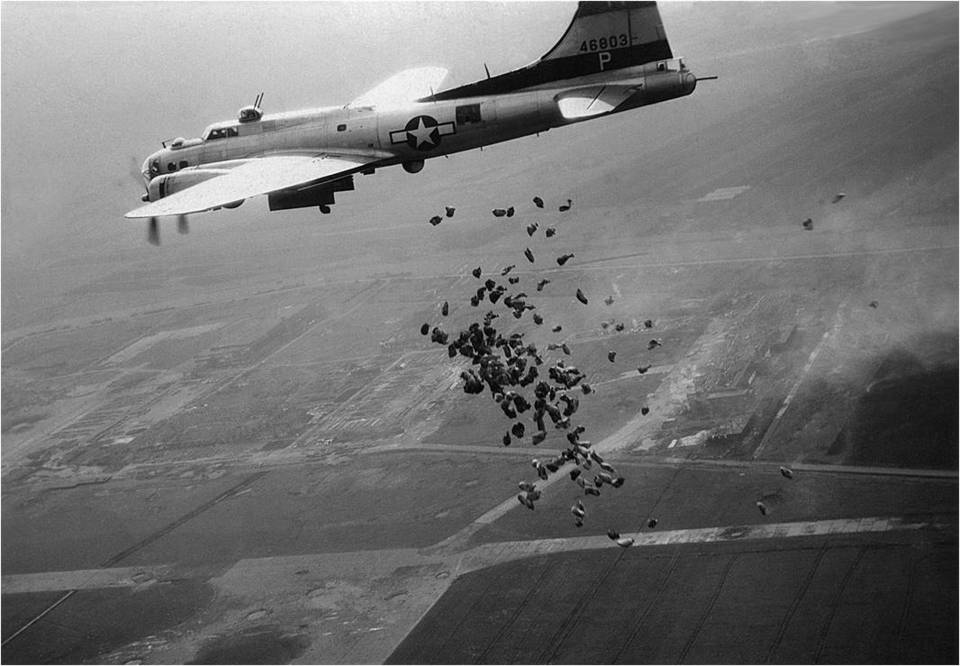
A U.S. B-17 dropping food parcels over a destroyed Schiphol Airport in the Netherlands as part of operation Chowhound, May 1945

- Undated – (Soviet Union) With its runways repaired Leningrad's Shosseynaya Airport (the future Pulkovo Airport) reopens; it had been closed since 1941 because of the proximity of German forces during the Siege of Leningrad. Only cargo and mail flights will take place until February 1948, when scheduled passenger service finally will resume.
- April 29 – May 9 – (Netherlands) Operations Manna, Chowhound, and Faust provided food to relieve a famine in the 1944–1945 German-occupied Netherlands. By May 1945, about 20,000 people in the Netherlands had died of starvation and three million were surviving on an ever-diminishing supply of food. The main area impacted by the famine encompassed the large cities in the west. The operations were undertaken by Allied air and ground forces in the last ten days of World War II. A truce with the German occupiers permitted the relief operation to be carried out. Manna (29 April – 7 May 1945), air-dropped 7,000 tonnes of food into the Nazi-occupied western part of the Netherlands. The operation was carried out by British Royal Air Force (RAF) units and squadrons from the Royal Australian Air Force (RAAF), Royal Canadian Air Force (RCAF), Royal New Zealand Air Force (RNZAF) and Polish Air Force squadrons in the RAF. Chowhound (1–8 May 1945) dropped 4,000 tonnes of food and was accomplished by the United States Army Air Forces. Faust (2–9 May 1945) was a ground operation carried out by the Canadian army which delivered 7,000 tons of food. In total, 18,000 tonnes of food were air dropped or trucked into the occupied Netherlands over 11 days. The war ended in the Netherlands with the 8 May overall surrender of Nazi Germany. The three operations staved off a more extensive famine in the Netherlands. With the end of the war, the Allies sent additional large quantities of food into the Netherlands to relieve food shortages.
- July – (United States) In its final full month of wartime operations, Air Transport Command carried 275,000 passengers (50,000 domestically) and 100,000 tons of mail and cargo, 96.7% of it overseas.

=== 1946 ===
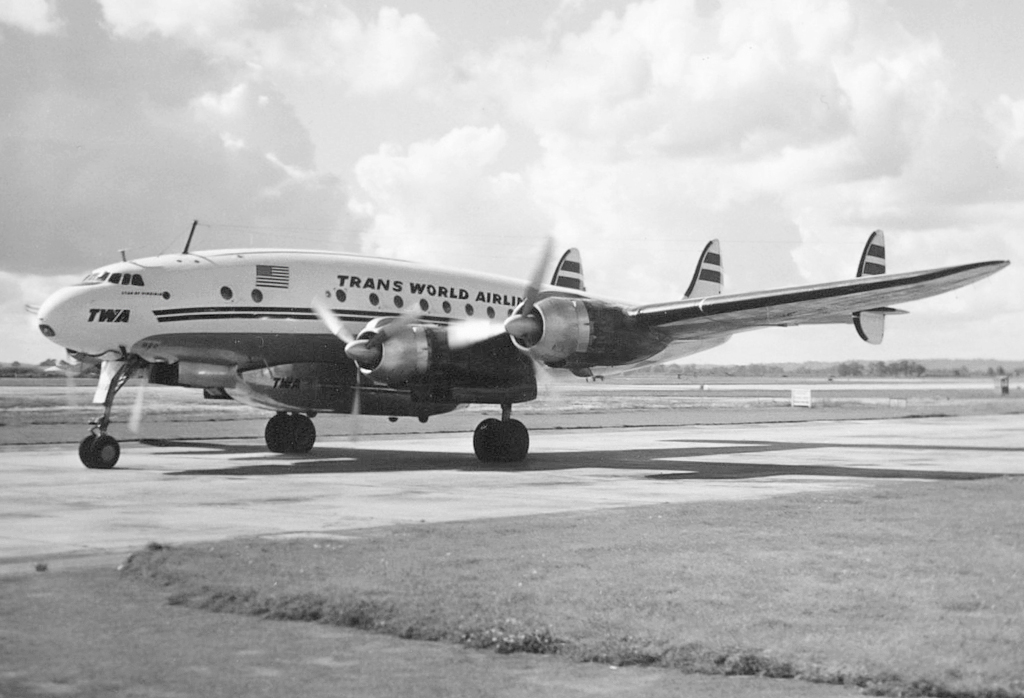
Lockheed L749A Constellation N6022C of Trans World Airlines at London (Heathrow) Airport in 1954

- Undated – (United States) Delta Air Lines begins regularly scheduled air cargo services, with a first shipment of 200 pounds of freshly picked mushrooms loaded aboard a DC-3 destined for Atlanta.
- February 11 – (United States-United Kingdom) The Bermuda Agreement was signed, forming a key bilateral framework governing international air services post-WWII facilitating international passenger, cargo and mail carriage through structured airline route rights and cooperative frameworks. It established a precedent for the signing of approximately 3,000 other such agreements between countries. The Agreement was replaced by the Bermuda II Agreement, which was signed in 1977 and effective in 1978. Prior to the Bermuda Agreement, the United States signed bilateral aviation agreements with several other European countries (Ireland, Norway, Sweden and Denmark), and had signed a multilateral Transport Agreement with several European and Latin American countries, but although he US and UK had generally agreed on the first two freedoms of the air (overflight and landings for repair/refueling) but the UK and several other countries refused to accept the US position on the third, fourth and fifth freedoms regarding the handling of passenger and cargo traffic.
- May 31 – (United Kingdom) London Heathrow Airport officially opened, becoming a major international gateway. Heathrow would quickly become a critical hub for transcontinental passenger traffic and air cargo routes, contributing to post-war global logistics expansion.
- June 22 – (United States) First Jet-Powered Airmail Demonstration. Two U.S. Army Air Force Lockheed P-80 Shooting Stars carried airmail in a demonstration event, marking the first use of jet propulsion for mail delivery. Although not a regular service, a showcase of jet technology potential for high-speed mail transport.
- July 11 – (United States) A fire begins in the baggage compartment of the Transcontinental and Western Airways Lockheed L-049 Constellation Star of Lisbon during a training flight with no passengers on board designated Flight 513. The fire spreads and the plane crashes near Reading, Pennsylvania, killing five of the six people on board. As a result of the accident, all Constellations are grounded from July 12 to August 23 for the installation of cargo fire detection equipment.
- July 31 – (United States) Santa Fe Skyway's inaugural service took place, flying 1,600 pounds of strawberries and 400 pounds of frozen swordfish for the Fred Harvey restaurant chain from Los Angeles to Salinas, California. The DC-3 aircraft had a pioneering refrigeration system in the cargo hold, making Santa Fe Skyway the world's first airline to transport refrigerated freight (perishables) in commercial service.
- October – (United States) Experiments with In-Flight Mail Processing. A U.S. Army Air Forces Fairchild C-82A Packet "Flying Mail Car" was leased to United Airlines in October 1946 for in-flight mail sorting testing, aimed at speeding up delivery by processing mail during flight. While not adopted because the amount of mail that could be sorted en route was too low to justify continuing the practice, it was an early experiment into mail logistics innovation.

=== 1947 ===
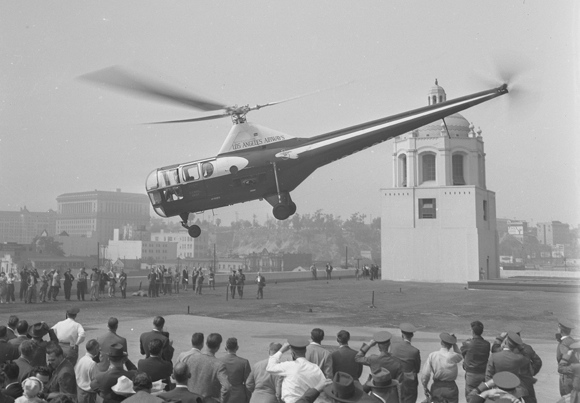
Los Angeles Airways helicopter taking off from the roof of Terminal Annex Post Office, first helicopter air-mail, 1947

- January 30 – (United States-Europe) Transcontinental and Western Air inaugurates the world's first regularly scheduled all-cargo air service to operate over the North Atlantic Ocean.
- August 10 – (United Kingdom-Belgium) British European Airways (BEA) begins the first European regular cargo-only airline service from Northolt to Brussels with a DC-3 freighter.
- September-November – (India-Pakistan) During the 1947 Partition of India, which displaced some 12 million people over a few months, the British Overseas Airways Corporation (BOAC) with 21 aircraft, RAF with 2 aircraft, and later another 21 aircraft from eight British operators a.o. Silver City Airways, conducted a crucial airlift to assist the Indian aviation companies and the RIAF that were overwhelmed by the magnitude of the evacuation. Tens of thousands of refugees, government personnel, and vital supplies were airlifted between the newly formed nations of India and Pakistan during this operation, often termed "Operation India", using chartered aircraft like Douglas DC-3 Dakotas and Bristol Wayfarers.
- October 1 – (United States) The U.S. government and U.S. Postal Service conducted experimental helicopter airmail delivery flights, testing helicopter use in metropolitan airmail delivery as from 1946. The world's first helicopter mail service was launched in October 1947 in the Los Angeles area using a Los Angeles Airways Sikorsky S-51.
- October 16 – (France / Spain) A Société Commerciale Aérienne du Littoral (SCAL) Bristol Type 170 Freighter I (registration F-BCJN) flying from Marseille–Marignane Airport outside Marseille, France, to Oran Es Sénia Airport outside Es Sénia, French Algeria, crashes into the Mediterranean Sea off Cartagena, Spain, killing 41 of the 43 people on board.

=== 1948 ===
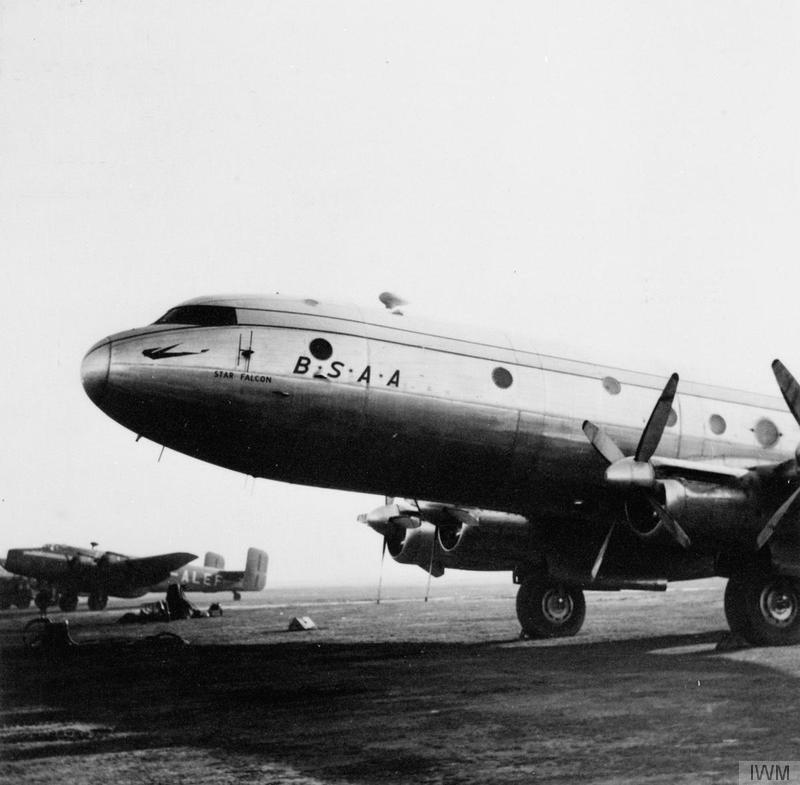
A civil registered Avro Tudor C5, G-AKBZ 'Star Falcon', of British South American Airways at Wunstorf aerodrome during the Berlin Airlift, 1948. This aircraft was used as a fuel freighter during the Airlift. In the background can be seen Handley Page Halifax, G-ALEF 'Red Eagle' of the Eagle Aviation company.

- Undated – (United States) In the post-war period, Pan American Airways considerably expanded its dedicated freight activities and by 1948 the airline was operating all-cargo services with Douglas DC-4s and a fleet of ten Curtiss C-46 Commandos, carrying approximately 18,000 tons of cargo across its network.
- June 1 – (United Kingdom) British European Airways (BEA) commences the first helicopter airmail service in the United Kingdom. The airline carried out trials with its Helicopter Experiment Unit, operating mail services in East Anglia during 1948.
- June 26 – (Germany) The Beginning of the Berlin Airlift. In response to the Soviet blockade of all land and rail access to West Berlin, Western Allies initiated an unprecedented airlift operation to sustain the city solely by airborne supply. This was both a military air transport operation and a turning point for cargo aviation, demonstrating that sustained large-scale cargo delivery by air was feasible. U.S. Air Force and Royal Air Force transports carried food, coal, medicine, and other essential supplies into West Berlin. On the first day 32 C-47 Skytrains delivered ~80 tons of cargo.
- July 1 – (United Kingdom) Following the end of the war, postal operations were progressively reinstated by the Post Office. From 1 July 1948, letter mail, letter packets, and postcards to destinations within Europe were once again accepted. In the same year, airmail services were also extended to include printed matter and other second-class items sent to countries outside Europe.
- July 13 – (United Kingdom-France) A Bristol Type 170 Freighter makes the first flight of Silver City Airways' air car-ferry service between Lympne, England, and Le Touquet, France.
- September 5 – (United States) On a 390-mile (628-km) flight from Naval Air Station Patuxent River, Maryland, to Cleveland, Ohio, the U.S. Navy Martin JRM-2 Mars flying boat Caroline Mars sets a new cargo record of 62,262 pounds (28,242 kg), the heaviest payload any aircraft had ever carried.

=== 1949 ===
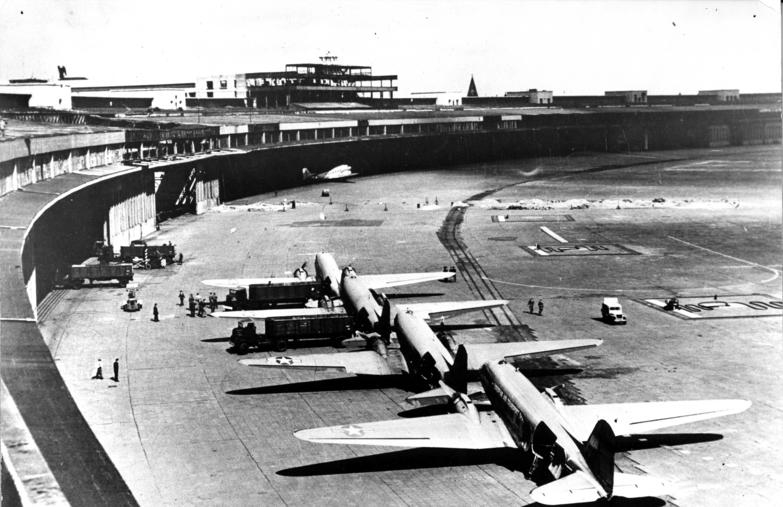
C-47 aircraft parked in front of the terminal at Tempelhof Central Airport during the Berlin Airlift, 1948

- March 31 – (Germany) The best single month of the Berlin Airlift concludes, with American aircraft having delivered 154,475 short tons (140,139 metric tons) of cargo to West Berlin since March 1. In total about 2.3 million tons were flown into West Berlin over ~277,000 flights.
- April – (United Kingdom) An airmail service for parcels to European countries was introduced by the Post Office.
- May 6 – (United Kingdom) During a Bristol Aeroplane Company test flight, a Bristol 170 Freighter 31 loses part of one of its wings and crashes into the English Channel off Portland, Dorset, England, killing all seven people on board.
- June 7 – (Puerto Rico) After its Number Two engine fails one minute after takeoff from Isla Grande Airport in San Juan, Puerto Rico, an overloaded Strato-Freighter Curtiss C-46D-5-CU Commando ditches in the Atlantic Ocean 200 yards (180 meters) off Punta Salinas. The aircraft remains afloat for six minutes, but 53 of the 81 people on board either die in the crash or drown. It is the deadliest aviation accident in Puerto Rican history, and at the time it is the second-deadliest involving any variant of the C-46.
- August – (United States) After much resistance from the established passenger airlines, the Civil Aeronautics Board (CAB) permitted four all-freight airlines to operate. These were Slick Airways Inc., Flying Tiger Line Inc., U. S. Airlines Inc., and Airnews Inc.
- August 6 – (Ecuador) A Bristol 170 Freighter 21 (registration HC-SBU) operated by Shell of Ecuador crashes at Ecuador's Salasaca Hill. killing all 34 people on board.

== Airlines, companies and organizations founded ==
This decade, the following airlines or air cargo related companies or organizations were founded that were or would become important for air cargo and airmail history:

=== 1940 ===
- November – (United States) The United States Department of War separates the General Headquarters Air Force (the United States Army's air combat element) from the United States Army Air Corps (responsible for aviation logistics and training).

=== 1941 ===
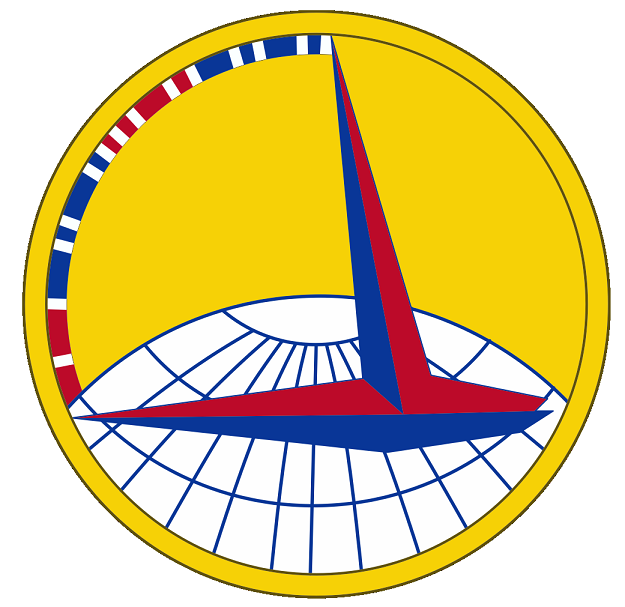
U.S. Air Corps Ferrying Command Distinctive Badge

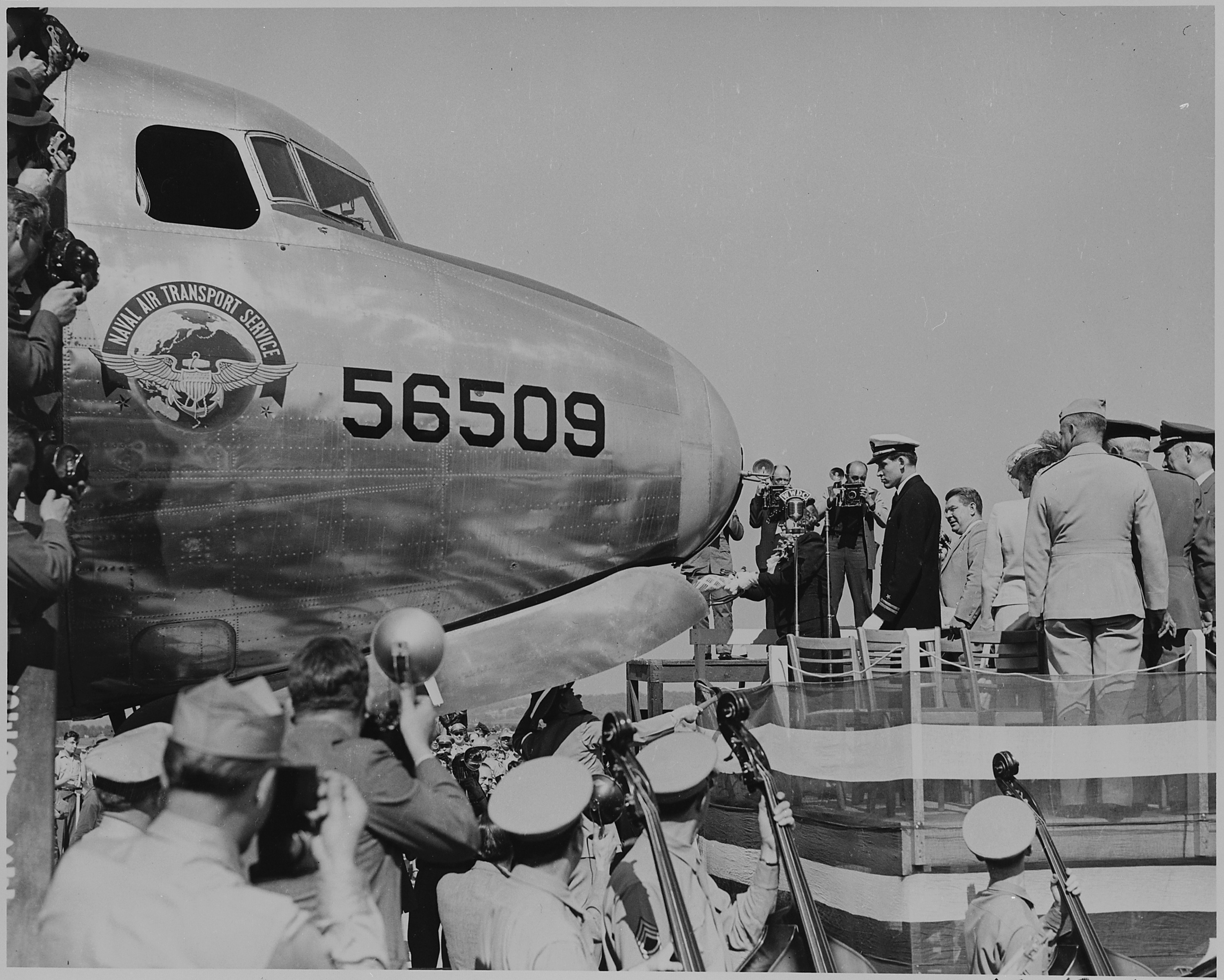
Bess Truman christening a Naval Air Transport Service (NATS) airplane, May 30, 1945.

- January – (United States) (50th Transport Wing) – After the first reorganization in 1940, the Army Air Corps own air-cargo services are further organized under the 50th Transport Wing. It already hauled more cargo than all the American civil airlines combined in the first six months of its existence, with scheduled services within the U.S. but also including the Panama Canal Zone.
- March 14 – (United States) Air Cargo Inc. (ACI) – formed by the "big four" airlines United, American, TWA and Eastern to deliver air freight, managing its ground transportation during wartime, which until then had always been a sideline operation next to the mail and passenger business. It is still the oldest network connecting air freight cartage agents and trucking companies for the logistics industry, with the Air Freight Directory as its main tool.
- May 29 – (United States) Ferrying Command – created by the U.S. Army Air Corps with the assignment to deliver aircraft (including under Lend-Lease) from factories to the allies at worldwide transfer points and to establish overseas air routes. The second assignment was to establish a military air transport service over the North Atlantic between the US and the United Kingdom, a project which had been under consideration for some months. During the thirteen months of its existence, Ferrying Command had grown from an original staff of two officers and a civilian secretary to a strength of over 11,000 officers and enlisted men, in addition to its civilian employees and those of the civil air carriers operating under its supervision.
- June 20 – (United States) United States Army Air Forces (USAAF) – created by the United States Department of War, with General Henry H. Arnold as its first commander. As part of the reorganization, General Headquarters Air Force is renamed Air Force Combat Command; the new Army Air Forces organization consists of Air Force Combat Command (its combat element) with the logistics and training element of the earlier United States Army Air Corps now retaining this name for such elements, during the war years.
- July 20 – (United Kingdom) RAF Ferry Command - a secretive Royal Air Force command, formed after a successful RAF trial delivery flight of seven U.S. aircraft over the North Atlantic in November 1939 (instead of delivering them by ship, which was common in these days), to ferry urgently needed aircraft from their place of manufacture in the United States and Canada, to the front line operational units in Britain, Europe, North Africa and the Middle East during the Second World War.
- December 12 – (United States) Naval Air Transport Service (NATS) – a branch of the United States Navy from 1941 to 1948. NATS was organised in early 1942 (commissions and squadron formations began in March–April 1942), and by mid-1942 started transoceanic and Pacific routes. NATS rapidly matured into a global naval air transport system that handled mail, passengers, critical cargo (including blood, spare parts and equipment), and ferrying. At its height during World War II, NATS's totaled four wings of 18 squadrons that operated 540 aircraft with 26,000 personnel assigned.

=== 1942 ===
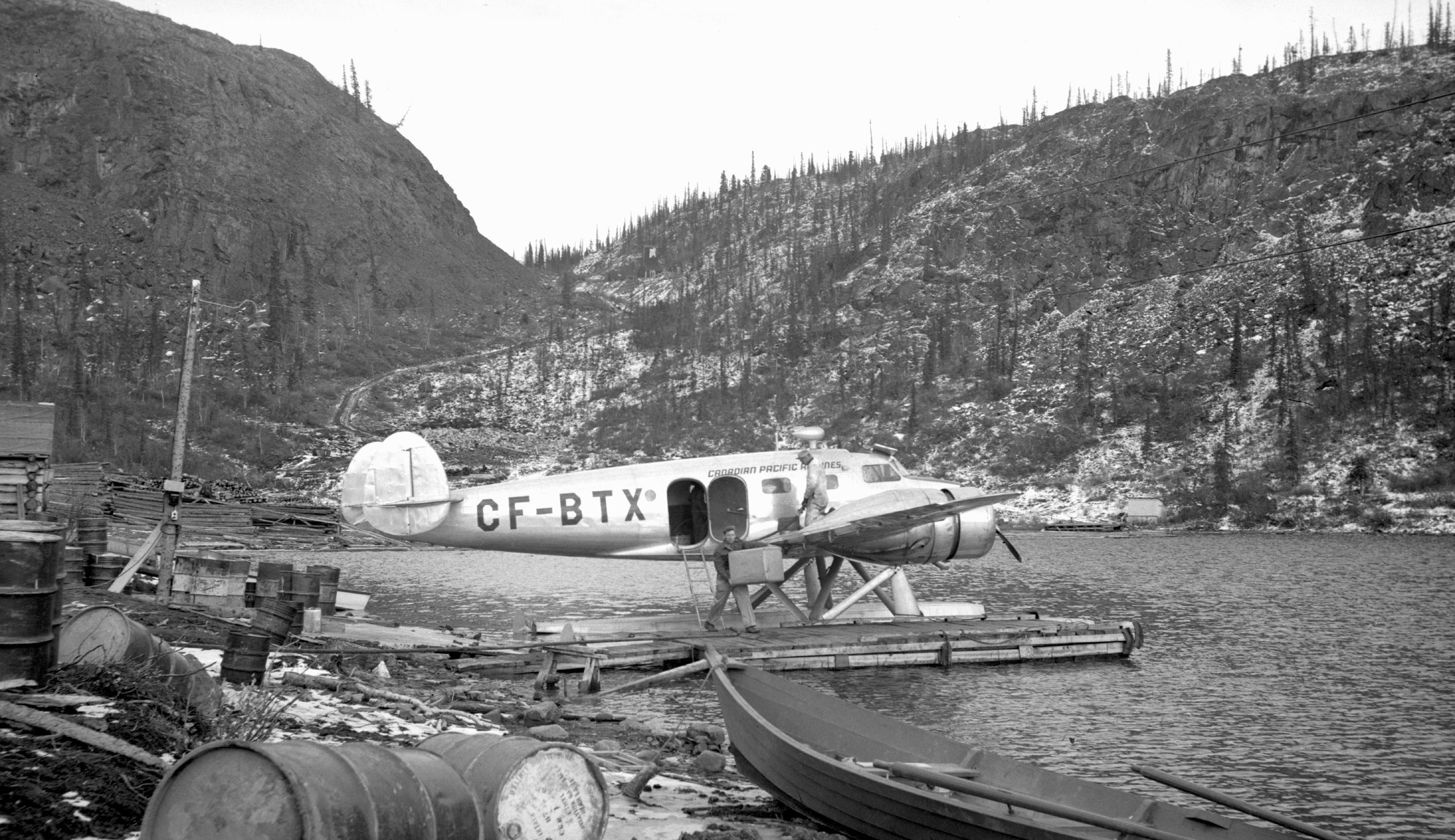
Canadian Pacific Airlines Barkley-Grow T8P-1 CF-BTX at dock in Port Radium, circa 1940–1945

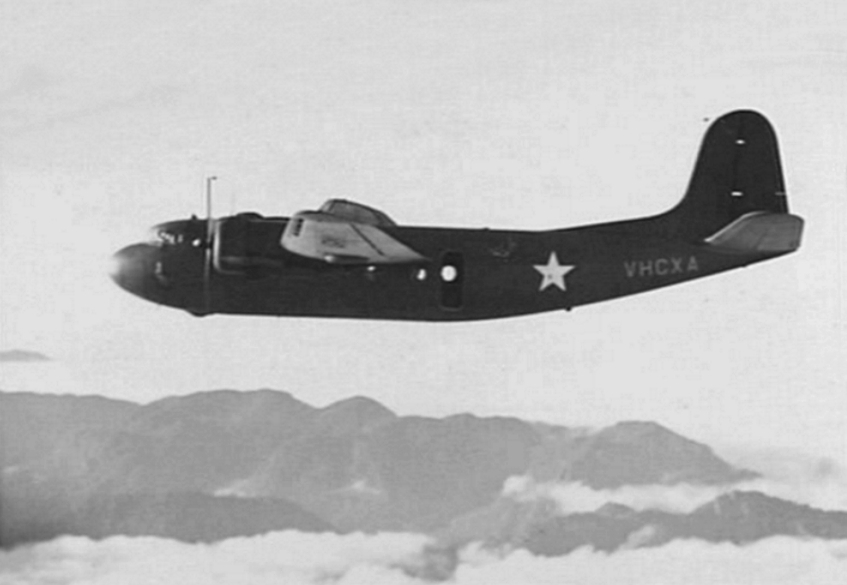
USAAF C-110, former KNILM DC-5, over New Guinea in 1942

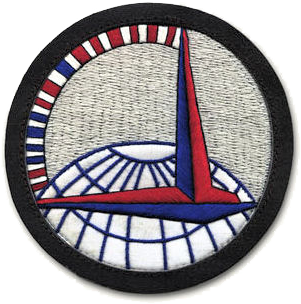
Air Transport Command Emblem

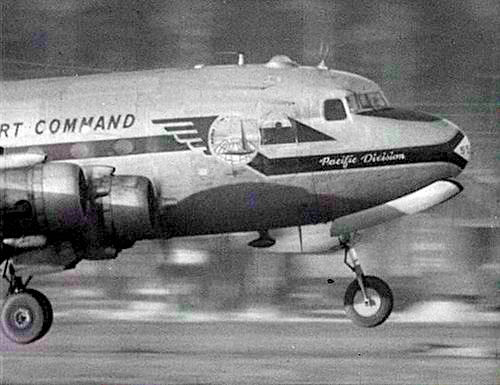
Air Transport Command C-54 taking off in 1942

- Undated – (United States Canadian Pacific Air Lines – a Canadian airline that operated from 1942 to 1987. It operated under the name CP Air from 1968 to 1986. In the early 1940s, the Canadian Pacific Railway Company purchased, in a short time span, ten bush airlines: Ginger Coote Airways, Yukon Southern Air Transport, Wings, Prairie Airways, Mackenzie Air Services, Arrow Airways, Starratt Airways, Quebec Airways and Montreal & Dominion Skyways finishing with the purchase of Canadian Airways in 1942, to form Canadian Pacific Air Lines. Early management were largely bush flying pioneers, including president Grant McConachie, superintendent Punch Dickins, and Wop May, who would become a repair depot manager in Calgary. Headquartered at Vancouver International Airport in Richmond, British Columbia, it served domestic Canadian as well as international routes until it was purchased by Pacific Western Airlines and absorbed into Canadian Airlines International.
- January 28 – (United States, Australia, Dutch East Indies) Allied Directorate of Air Transport (DAT) South West Pacific Area (SWPA) – initially activated as the Air Transport Command, at Amberley Airdrome in Queensland, Australia, the name was soon changed to the Directorate of Air Transport to avoid confusion with the U.S.-based Air Transport Command. The unit was a unique combination of American Army Air Force units and the RAAF, operating under the direct control of the Allied Air Forces, SWPA. DAT also operated a group of civilian planes chartered to the Allied Air Forces from the Dutch East Indies (KNILM) and four Australian airlines (Ansett, Australian National Airways, Guinea Airways and Qantas.
- May 14 – (United States) Contract Air Cargo Division (CACD) – established under the USAAF (former USAAC) Air Service Command (ASC). It was managed by former airline executives, who established routes outside the United States to Alaska, the upper Atlantic, and Central America. Many of the routes and services duplicated those of the Ferrying Command. Its primary mission was to supervise the domestic cargo operations performed by commercial airlines under military contract during the war.
- June 20 – (United States) Air Transport Command – a rename of the USAAF (former USAAC)'s Ferrying Command, effective 1 July 1942, the new Air Transport Command was given what the official history of the AAF described as "sweeping responsibilities":
  - The ferrying of all aircraft within the United States and to destinations outside of the United States as directed by the Commanding General, Army Air Forces.
  - The control, operation, and maintenance of establishments and facilities on air routes outside of the United States.
  - The transportation by air of personnel, materiel, and mail for all War Department agencies, except those served by Troop Carrier units.
  - In addition,
    - the Army's Services of Supply agreed to transfer to the AAF all of its air transportation responsibilities and its responsibility for setting priorities for travel by military and commercial aircraft, and also
    - the Contract Air Cargo Division (CACD) was terminated by the Air Service Command ASC and its personnel transferred to ATC to end the division of responsibility.
- July 31 – (United States) Services of Supply, (today: Transportation Corps) – a combat service support branch of the U.S. Army. It is nowadays responsible for the movement of personnel and material by truck, rail, air, and sea, although during WWII it agreed to transfer to the AAF all of its air transportation responsibilities and its responsibility for setting priorities for travel by military and commercial aircraft to Air Transport Command. It is one of three U.S. Army logistics branches, the others being the Quartermaster Corps and the Ordnance Corps. The Corps was established in its current form on 31 July 1942, with predecessor services dating back to the American Civil War.

=== 1943 ===
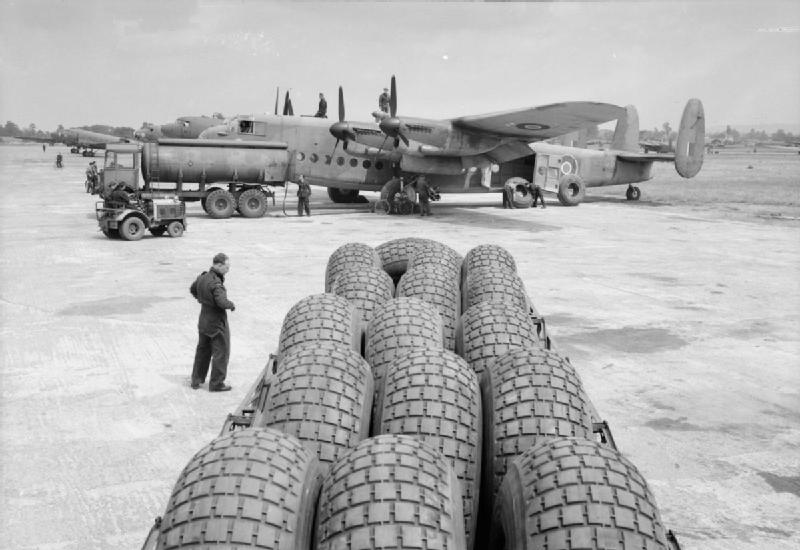
Royal Air Force Transport Command, 1943–1945. Aircraft tyres are loaded onto Avro York C Mark I, MW137, of No. 511 Squadron RAF at Lyneham, Wiltshire, which is being prepared and refuelled for a flight to the Far East.

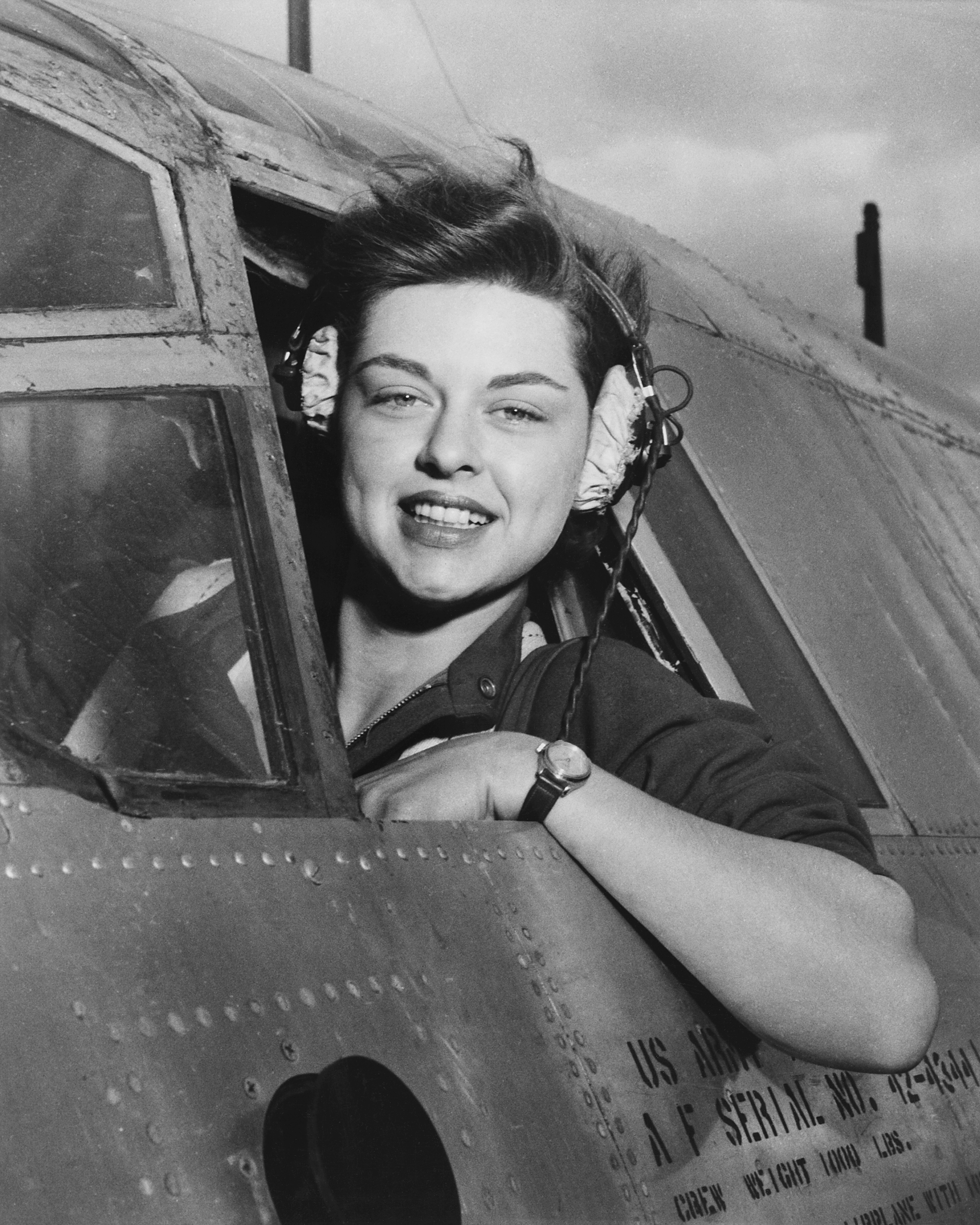
Elizabeth L. Remba Gardner, Women's Airforce Service Pilots – WASP

- March 25 – (United Kingdom) RAF Transport Command – a Royal Air Force command that controlled all transport aircraft of the RAF. It was established on 25 March 1943 by the renaming of the RAF Ferry Command, and was subsequently renamed RAF Air Support Command in 1967.
- August 5 – (United States) Women Airforce Service Pilots – a civilian women pilots' organization part of Air Transport Command's Ferrying Division, whose members were United States federal civil service employees. Members of WASP became trained pilots who tested aircraft, ferried aircraft and trained other pilots. Their purpose was to free male pilots for combat roles during World War II. Despite various members of the armed forces being involved in the creation of the program, the WASP and its members had no military standing. WASP was preceded by the Women's Flying Training Detachment (WFTD) and the Women's Auxiliary Ferrying Squadron (WAFS), both organized separately in September 1942. They were pioneering organizations of civilian women pilots, who were attached to the United States Army Air Forces to fly military aircraft during World War II. On August 5, 1943, the WFTD and WAFS merged to create the WASP organization. After their training, the WASP were stationed at 122 air bases across the U.S., where they assumed numerous flight-related missions. The original WAFS were organized specifically to ferry airplanes and free male pilots, around 900 in all, for combat roles. A WASP would go to the factory, test fly the airplane and then deliver it. During World War II, women pilots flew 80 percent of all ferrying missions. Between September 1942 and December 1944, the WASP delivered 12,652 aircraft of 78 different types. They also towed targets for live anti-aircraft artillery practice, simulated strafing missions, and transported cargo.

=== 1944 ===
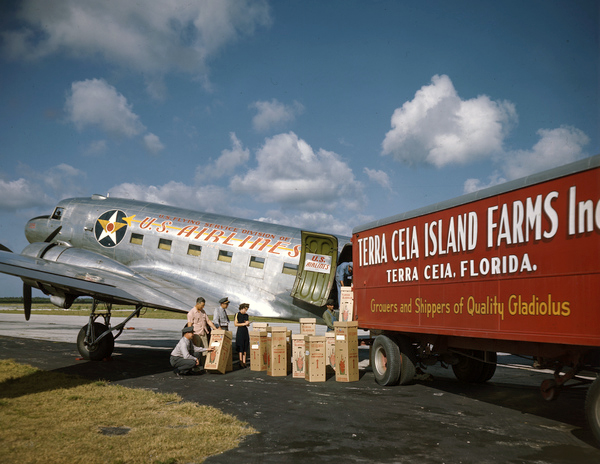
Terra Ceia Island Farms gladiolus being loaded onto a U. S. Airlines plane at the Sarasota Airport, May 8, 1947

- December 7 – (United States) Provisional International Civil Aviation Organization (PICAO) – The Convention on International Civil Aviation, also known as the Chicago Convention, in Chicago, was signed by 52 countries on 7 December 1944. Under its terms, a Provisional International Civil Aviation Organization (PICAO) was to be established, to be replaced in turn by a permanent organization when twenty-six countries ratified the convention. PICAO began operating on 6 June 1945, replacing the International Commission for Air Navigation (ICAN) of 1919. The 26th country ratified the convention on 5 March 1947 and, consequently, PICAO held its last session from 29 April 1947 until 7 May 1947, with the Convention on International Civil Aviation coming into force on 4 April 1947 as the International Civil Aviation Organization (ICAO).

=== 1945 ===
IATA logo

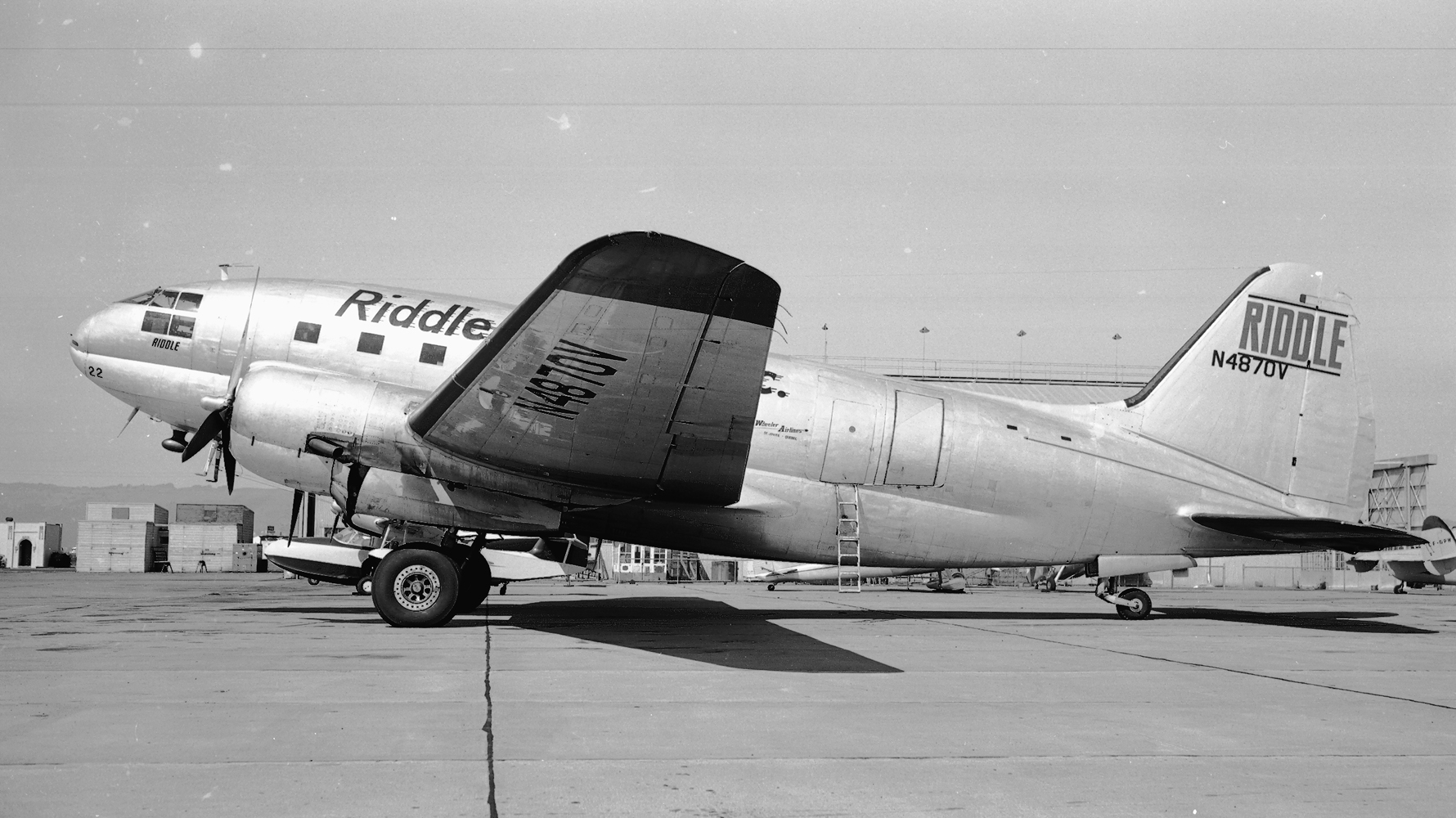
Riddle Airlines C-46 N4870V at Oakland, California, in August 1955.

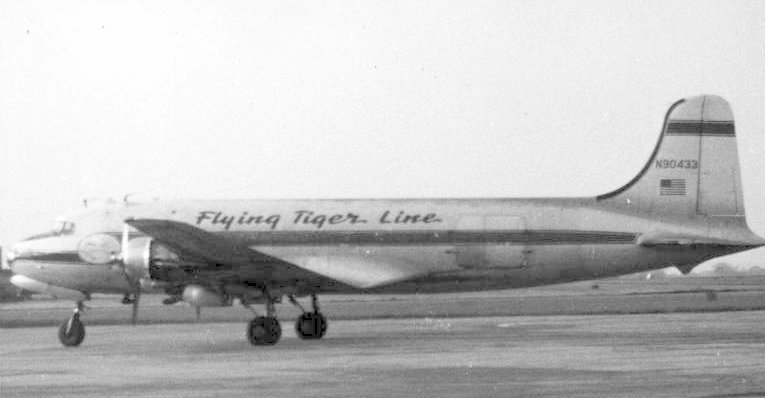
Flying Tiger Line DC-4 N90433 at MAN, 1955

- April 19 – (Cuba) International Air Transport Association (IATA) – formed in April 1945 in Havana, Cuba, as the successor to the International Air Traffic Association, which was formed in 1919 in The Hague, Netherlands. At its founding, IATA consisted of 57 airlines from 31 countries. Much of IATA's early work was technical and IATA provided input to the newly created International Civil Aviation Organization (ICAO), which was reflected in the annexes of the Chicago Convention in 1944, the international treaty that still governs international air transport. IATA's standards and practices (for tariffs, interline cooperation, mail/cargo documentation, airport and airline codes, air freight rules, etc.) helped lay the foundation for standardized international air transport, including cargo and mail services.
- May 28 – (United States) Riddle Airlines – an airline incorporated in Florida by John Paul Riddle on 28 May 1945 in Miami, Florida. The carrier was initially a nonscheduled or irregular air carrier, but in 1951 the CAB certificated it as a scheduled freight airline between New York and Miami on the one hand and Puerto Rico on the other. In 1955, the CAB awarded Riddle further certification for a portion of the north–south domestic cargo routes previously awarded to defunct U. S. Airlines. In November 1963, Riddle Airlines shareholders voted to rename the company to Airlift International, a measure approved in March 1964 by the CAB. In 1966, Airlift acquired the assets of defunct Slick Airways to ensure continuity of charter operations for the military. In 1968, Airlift acquired the scheduled route authority of Slick.
- June 25 – (United States) Flying Tiger Line, also known as Flying Tigers – the first scheduled cargo airline in the United States and a military charter operator during the Cold War era for both cargo and personnel (the latter with leased aircraft). The airline was bought by Federal Express in 1989. The airline was named after the Flying Tigers fighter unit of World War II, officially the 1st American Volunteer Group. After returning to the United States in 1945, ten former AVG pilots led by Robert William Prescott established the Flying Tiger Line on 24 June 1945 under the name National Skyway Freight using a small fleet of 14 Budd Conestoga freighters purchased as war surplus from the United States Navy.
- October 6 – (Colombia) SAM (Sociedad Aeronáutica de Medellín) – a Colombian airline with its main hub at El Dorado International Airport in Bogotá, SAM operated domestic and international routes and was a subsidiary of Avianca. The company had originally intended to acquire small aircraft, but the concept changed and grew. The airline would acquire long-range aircraft to secure the cargo market to and from Miami. The airline's first Douglas C-47 arrived in October 1946 and departed from Las Playas Airport in Medellín heading to Miami in the midst of much celebration. SAM transported mail from Medellín to Bogotá, Barrancabermeja, Bucaramanga, Cartagena, and later began regular flights to Panama and Miami with the Curtiss C-46.

=== 1946 ===
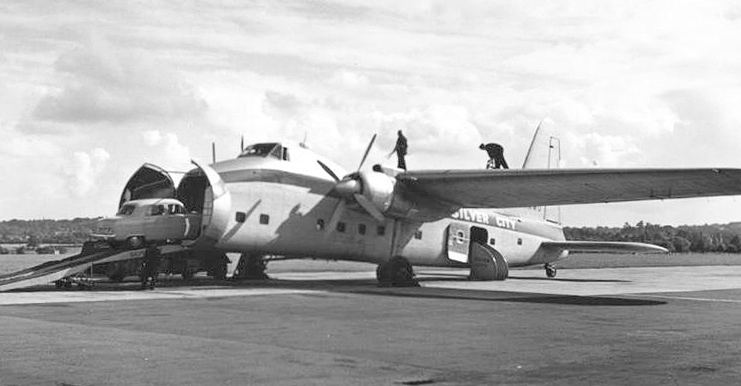
Bristol 170 Freighter 32 of Silver City Airways loading a car at Southampton, September 1954

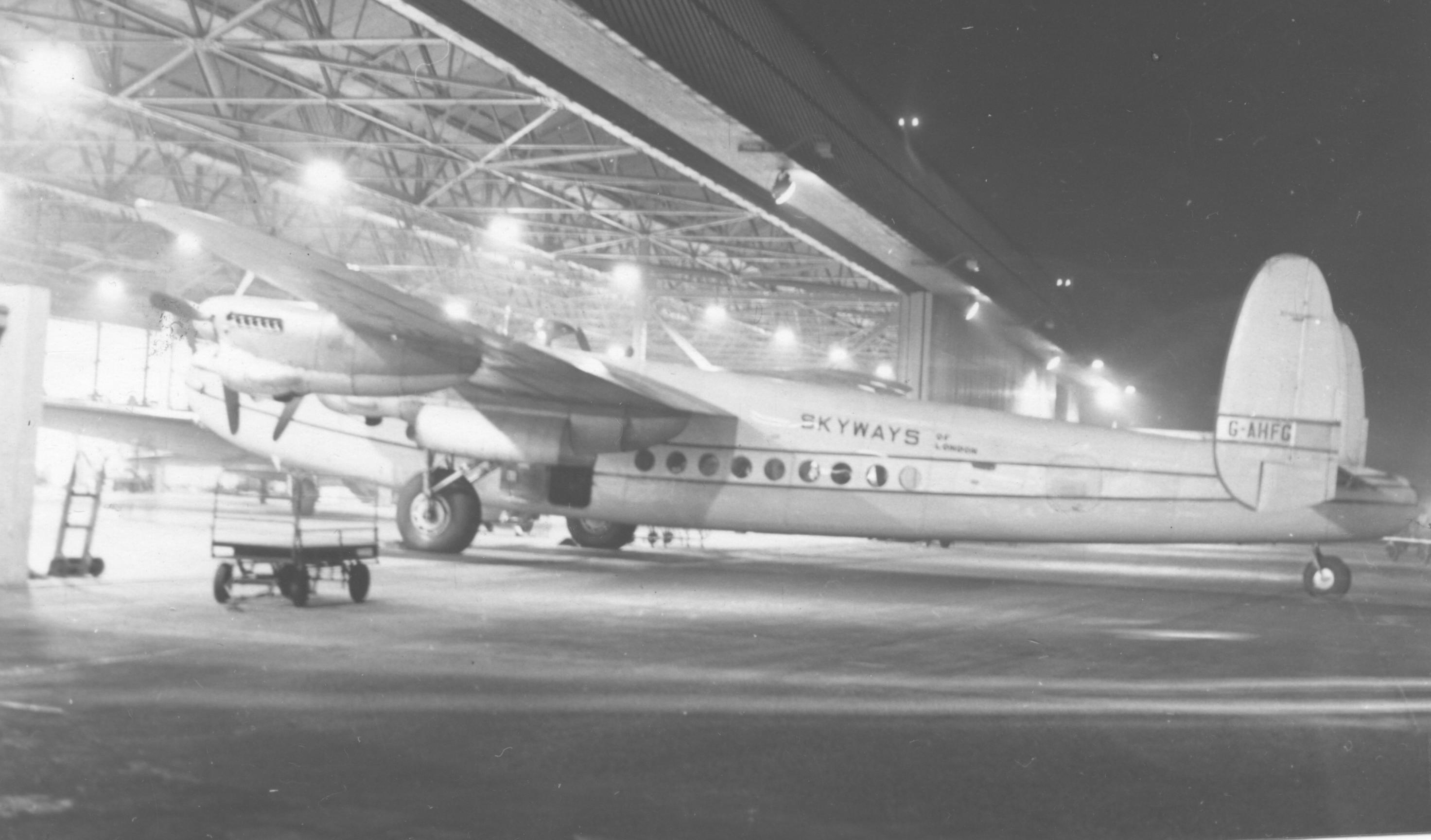
Avro York G-AHFG Skyways Ringway, 21 nov 52

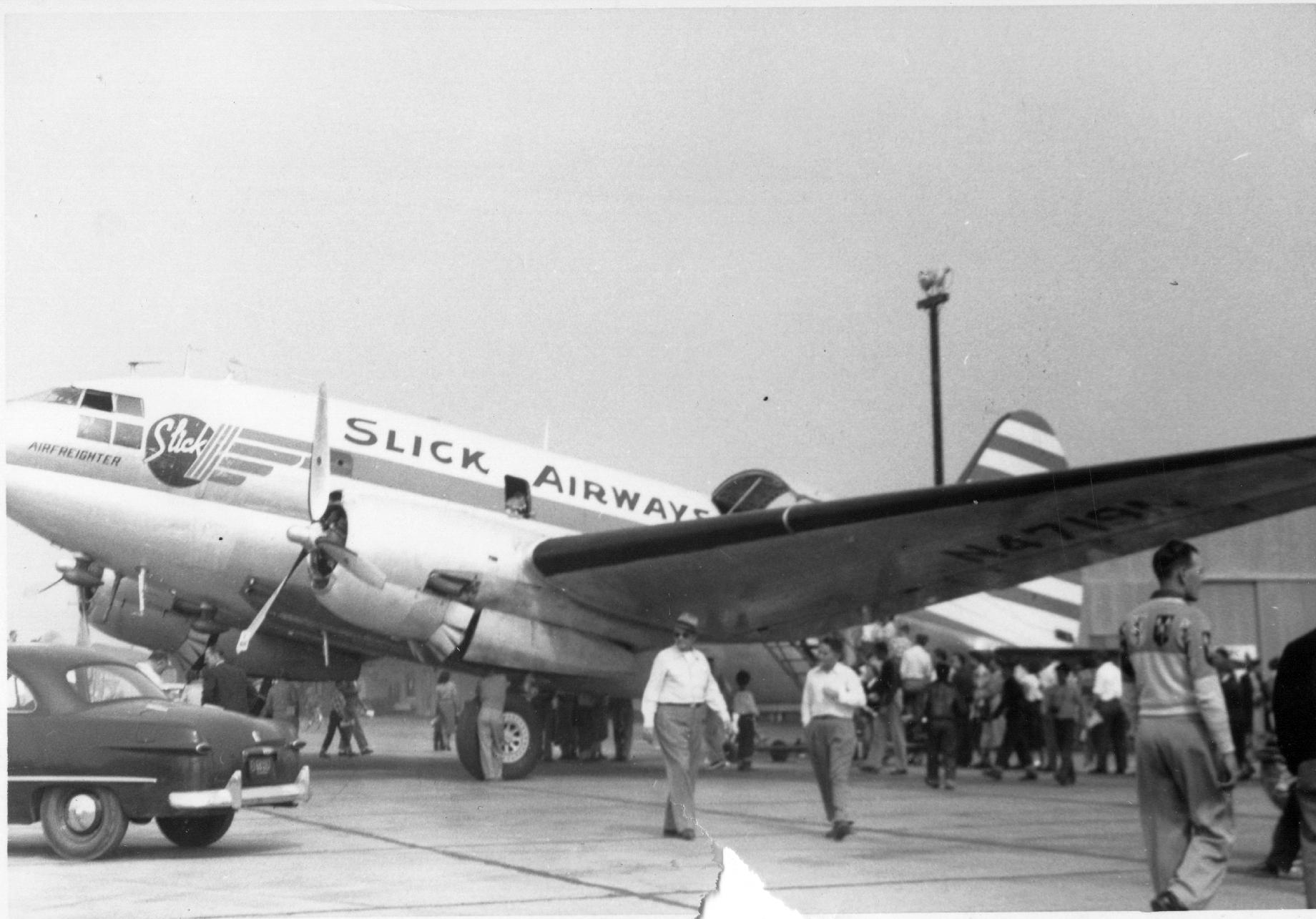
Slick Airways C-46D at LAX in 1949

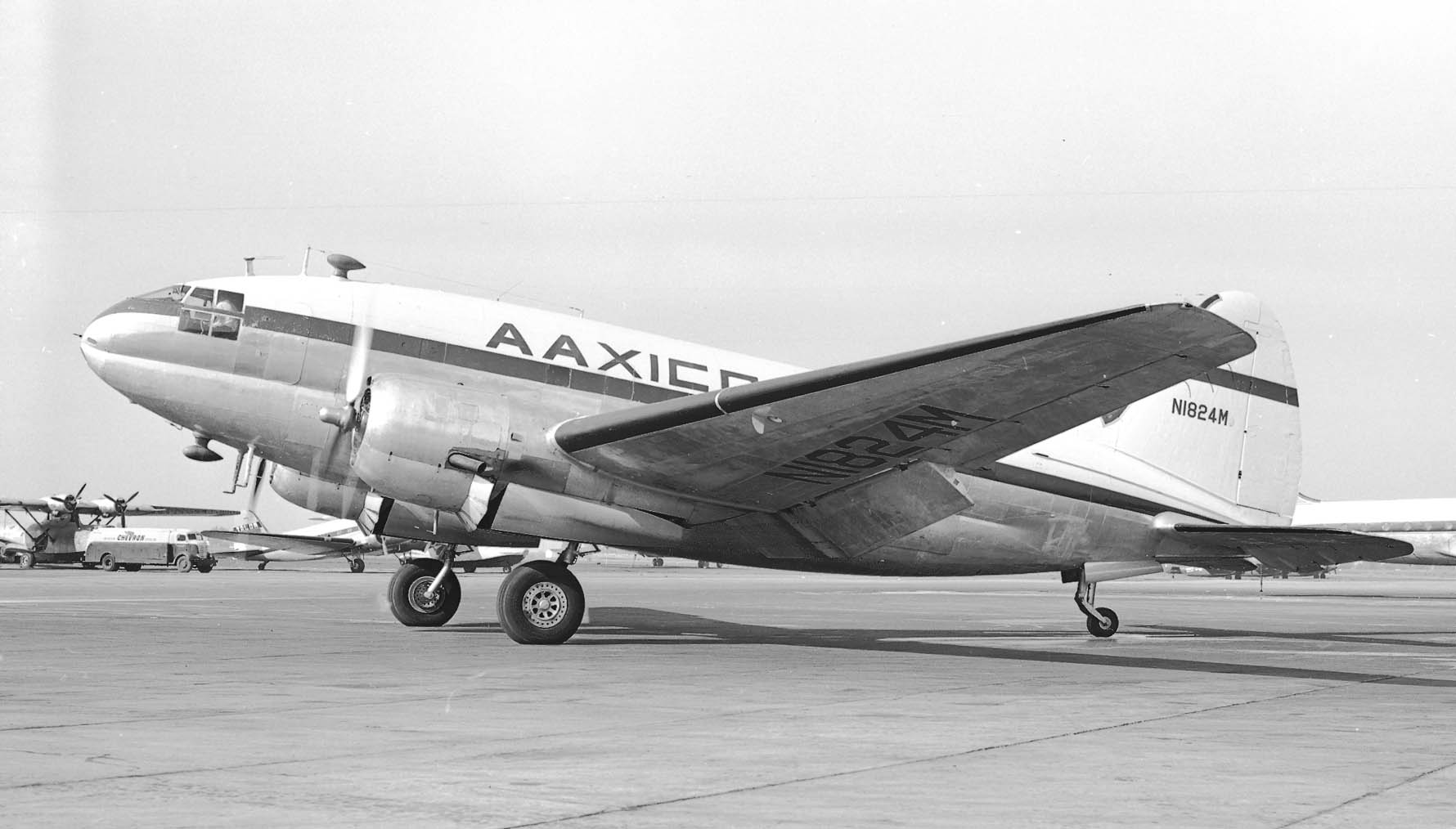
American Air Export & Import Company (AAXICO) C-46D N1824M at Oakland on February 5, 1954.

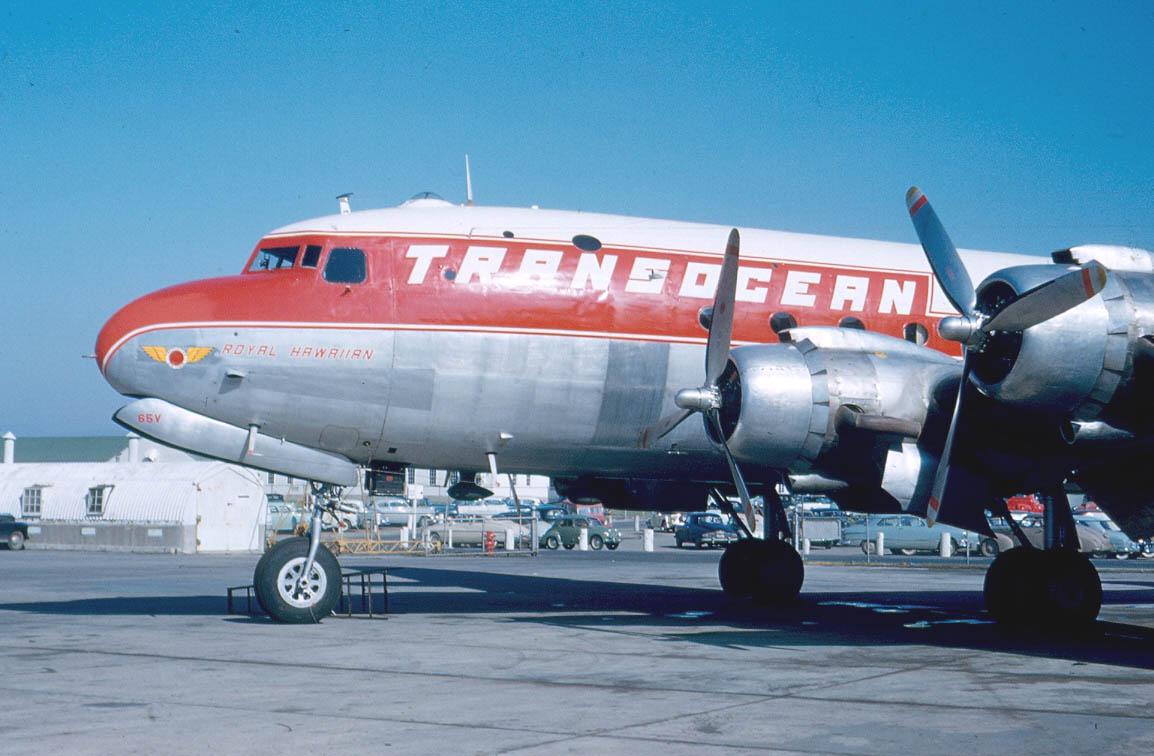
Transocean Air Lines DC-4 (Bill Larkins)

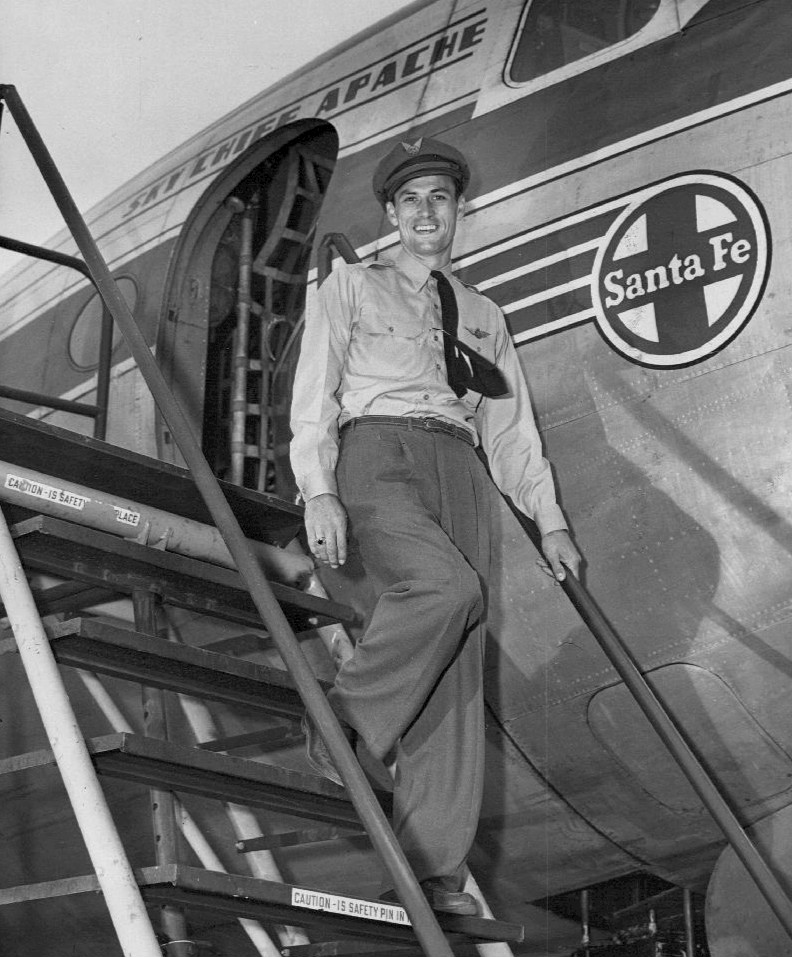
Santa Fe Skyway plane "Sky Chief Apache" and its pilot, E.W. Harris - between 1946-1952

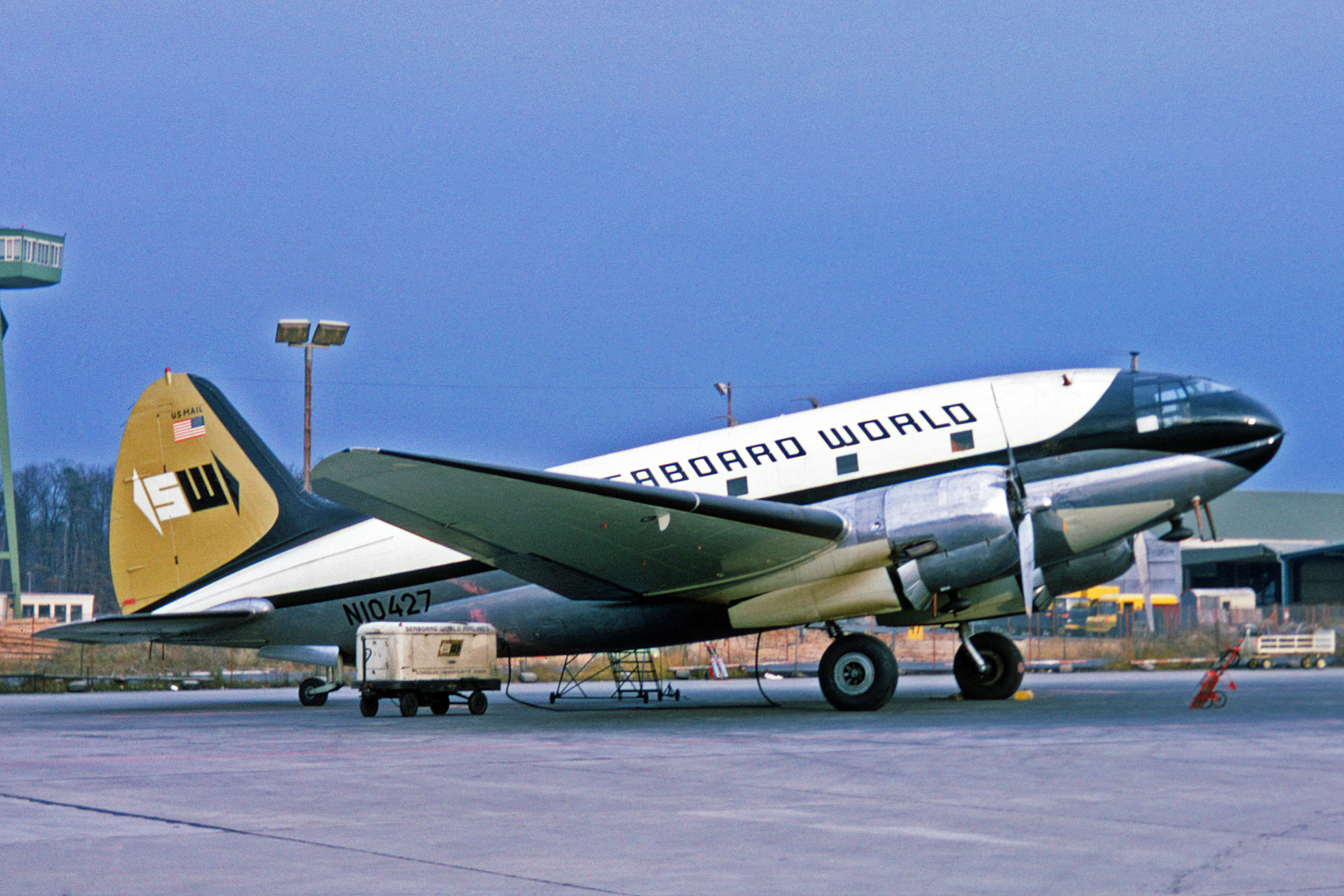
Seaboard World Airlines Curtiss C-46A Commando N10427 in FRA, 08 DEC 1967

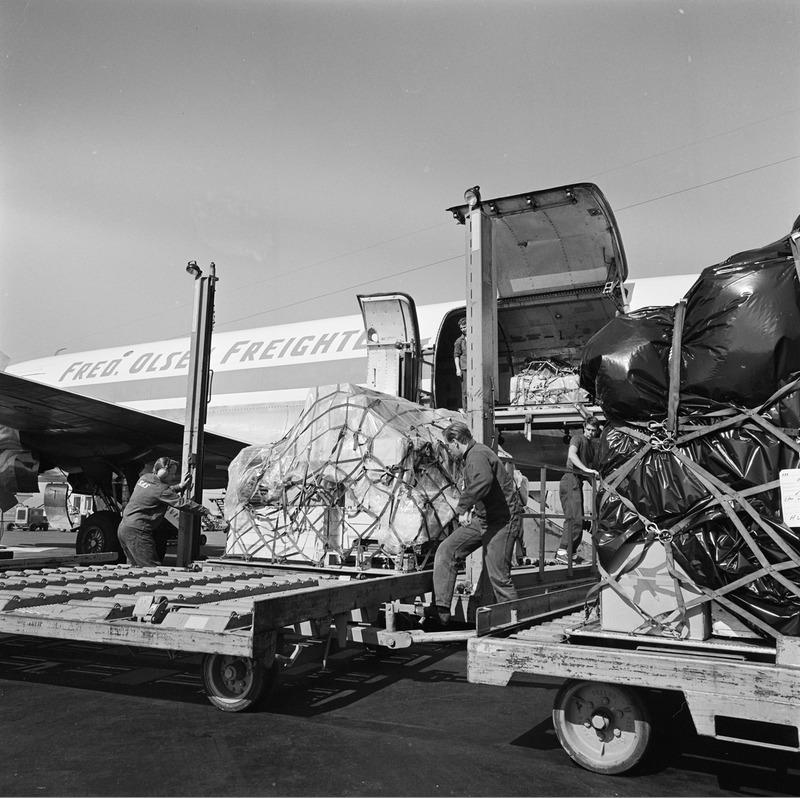
Loading Fred. Olsen DC-6 at Fornebu 13 August 1970

- Undated – (Australia) Thomas Nationwide Transport (TNT) and later TNT Limited – an Australian logistics and transport company. It was taken over by KPN in 1996 and in 1998 became part of the TNT Post Group.
- Undated – (United Kingdom) Silver City Airways – an airline based in the United Kingdom that operated mainly air ferry services in Europe between 1946 and 1962. By the mid-1950s, Silver City had become the biggest air cargo carrier in the United Kingdom while annual passenger numbers at its "Ferryfield" base had reached ¼ of a million.
- Undated – (United Kingdom) Skyways Limited – an early post-World War II British airline formed in 1946 that soon became well-established as the biggest operator of non-scheduled air services in Europe. Its principal activities included the operation of worldwide non-scheduled passenger and cargo services, including trooping and oil industry support flights, inclusive tour (IT) and ad hoc charters for automobile industry executives as well as specialist freight services.
- Undated – (United States) Airborne Express – founded as the Airborne Flower Traffic Association of California in 1946 to fly flowers from Hawaii to the US mainland, was an express delivery company and cargo airline, headquartered in Seattle, Washington, with its hub in Wilmington, Ohio. Airborne was Airborne Express was acquired by DHL in 2003. Prior to the acquisition, it rose to be the third largest private express delivery company in the United States, behind FedEx and United Parcel Service.
- Undated est. 1946? – (United States) Airnews Inc. – an early cargo airline, subsidiary of the Express Publishing Company in San Antonio, Texas, utilizing air transport primarily for newspaper distribution before expanding into general cargo. Airnews Inc. received CAB permission to operate in 1949 but struggled financially and declared bankruptcy in June 1951 after running heavy losses.
- Undated – (United States) Emery Air Freight Corporation – an air freight forwarder founded by John C. Emery Sr. and Leonard G. Hunt in New York City. Emery was the first air freight forwarder to apply for a license from the Civil Aeronautics Board (CAB) as a common carrier, despite opposition from scheduled airlines. In 1948, Emery was granted common air freight carrier license No. 1 by the CAB. Emery was a pioneer in the early air freight industry, initially renting space on existing carrier routes before developing a fleet of dedicated aircraft. For nearly 40 years, Emery was the largest freight carrier in the world. Emery was acquired by Consolidated Freightways in 1989 and by United Parcel Service (under the name Menlo Worldwide Forwarding) in 2004.
- January – (United States) Slick Airways – originally founded as an irregular air carrier before becoming one of the first scheduled cargo airlines in the United States, awarded a certificate for scheduled cargo service in the same proceeding that awarded a certificate to Flying Tiger Line. The airline was founded by Earl F. Slick, a Texas aviator and multimillionaire who along with his brother, inherited $25 million (around $324 million in 2015 currency) in oil wealth after their father's death in 1930. By 1951, the company had become the largest all-cargo airline of the United States. On 16 April of that year, Slick Airways became the first airline to operate the freighter variant of the Douglas DC-6 (the passenger variant had been introduced with United Airlines five days earlier). On 1 July 1966, Slick Airways was shut down because of a lasting poor financial situation, and the assets were acquired by Airlift International to ensure continuity of Slick's military charter operations. In 1968, Airlift was awarded Slick's former scheduled cargo authority.
- February – (France) Société Commerciale Aérienne du Littoral (SCAL) – An airline performing cross-channel car transports using Bristol Freighters.
- March 23 – (United States) AAXICO Airlines – an airline based in the United States; AAXICO is an acronym for American Air Export and Import Company. Initially founded as a non-scheduled airline or irregular air carrier, AAXICO was awarded certification as a scheduled air cargo airline in 1955 by the Civil Aeronautics Board (CAB), the now-defunct Federal agency that, at the time, tightly regulated almost all US commercial air transportation. However, in 1962 AAXICO reverted to a supplemental air carrier. In 1965, it was nominally bought by Saturn Airways, another supplemental airline, but AAXICO was the surviving management and ownership. In its later years, AAXICO was noted for its consistent profitability, financial strength and its near total focus on flying for the military, in particular for the Air Force Logair domestic air freight program.
- May 21 – (United States) Transocean Air Lines Known for the first few months of its existence as Orvis Nelson Air Transport (ONAT) – a supplemental air carrier, a type of U.S. airline defined and regulated by the Civil Aeronautics Board (CAB), the now-defunct United States Government agency that, from 1938 to 1978, tightly regulated almost all U.S. commercial air transportation. Transocean founder Orvis Marcus Nelson was an Air Transport Command (ATC) pilot during World War II. During the time the airline operated, supplemental airlines were charter/scheduled hybrids, legally able to operate a limited amount of scheduled service, which Transocean did, especially towards the end of its existence. Transocean was based in Oakland, California. The airline was among the most operationally capable of the supplemental airlines, regularly operating many thousands of miles from the United States. At times it accounted for over 20% of the revenue of all supplemental air carriers, and it usually was the largest supplemental by revenue. However, Transocean fell on increasingly hard financial times during the 1950s and ceased operating in 1960.
- July 31 – (United States) Santa Fe Skyway - a short-lived but innovative all-cargo airline operated by the Atchison, Topeka and Santa Fe (AT&SF) Railway company in the post-World War II era, that operated from 1946 to 1948. The airline was established to transport high-priority and perishable freight, such as fresh produce and frozen goods, faster than traditional rail service, and was a pioneer in intermodal freight transport, testing communication systems between its airline and railway crews. Operations extended across the USA on domestic routes, including cargo flights between Chicago and Los Angeles. Santa Fe Skyway used surplus military aircraft converted for civilian cargo use, including Douglas C-47 (DC-3 type) and Douglas C-54 (DC-4 type) planes. The planes were named after Native American tribes, e.g. one DC-4 was christened "Sky Chief Navajo". The airline operated as a contract carrier under a temporary license, which restricted it to a small number of customers and non-scheduled service. When the company applied to the Civil Aeronautics Board (CAB) for certification to operate as a common carrier (allowing scheduled flights and a wider customer base), the application was rejected. The CAB's stance was that surface transport operators, such as a railroad, could not operate an airline, citing it was not in the public interest. Despite being profitable and operating without accident during its brief run, the regulatory decision forced Santa Fe Skyway to cease operations in January 1948.
- September 16 – (United States) Seaboard & Western Airlines, from 1961 named Seaboard World Airlines – an international all-cargo airline, originally an irregular air carrier until in 1955, it received final approval on CAB certification to fly scheduled cargo services across the Atlantic. Seaboard was the first airline to fly a 747 Freighter service from the UK to the USA.
- September 24 – (China) Cathay Pacific Airways – founded in Hong Kong by initial shareholders Sydney "Syd" de Kantzow, Roy Farrell, Neil Buchanan, Donald Brittan Evans and Robert "Bob" Stanley Russell. Buchanan and Russell had already worked for de Kantzow and Farrell at Roy Farrell Import-Export Company, the predecessor of Cathay Pacific, that was initially headquartered in Shanghai. Both de Kantzow and Farrell were Ex-Air Force pilots who had flown The Hump, a route over the Himalayan mountains. The company began freight services on 28 January 1950 from Sydney to Shanghai, after Farrell and Russell obtained a licence to carry freight (but not passengers) earlier that month. Today Cathay remains a top-tier global cargo carrier, consistently ranking in the top 10 worldwide by cargo volume (CTKs) and a leading combination airline, leveraging its strong Hong Kong hub and extensive network.
- October 16 – (Norway) A/S Fred. Olsens Flyselskap (FOF), trading internationally as Fred. Olsen Airtransport – a Norwegian charter airline which operated between 1946 and 1997, largely operating cargo aircraft. Based at Oslo Airport, Fornebu.

=== 1947 ===
ICAO logo

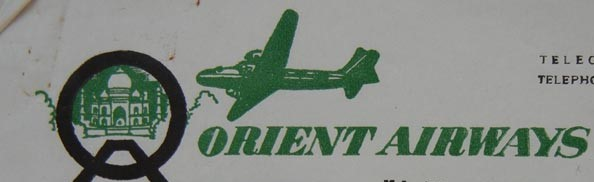
Orient Airways was a Calcutta-based airline of British India that later shifted to the Dominion of Pakistan and became Pakistan International Airlines.

- April 4 – (Canada) International Civil Aviation Organization (ICAO) – a specialized agency of the United Nations that coordinates the principles and techniques of international air navigation, and fosters the planning and development of international air transport to ensure safe and orderly growth. The ICAO Council adopts standards and recommended practices concerning air navigation, its infrastructure, flight inspection, prevention of unlawful interference, and facilitation of border-crossing procedures for international civil aviation, also important for airmail and air freight, providing the essential global framework of standards and regulations that ensure the safety, security, and efficiency of international air cargo operations, working together with the UPU and WCO.
- June 04 – (British India / Pakistan) Orient Airways – later evolved into Pakistan International Airlines (PIA).
- September 18 – (United States) United States Air Force (USAF) – became a separate branch of the armed forces this day. Its organizational emphasis on long-range air transport directly influenced military airlift doctrine.

=== 1948 ===
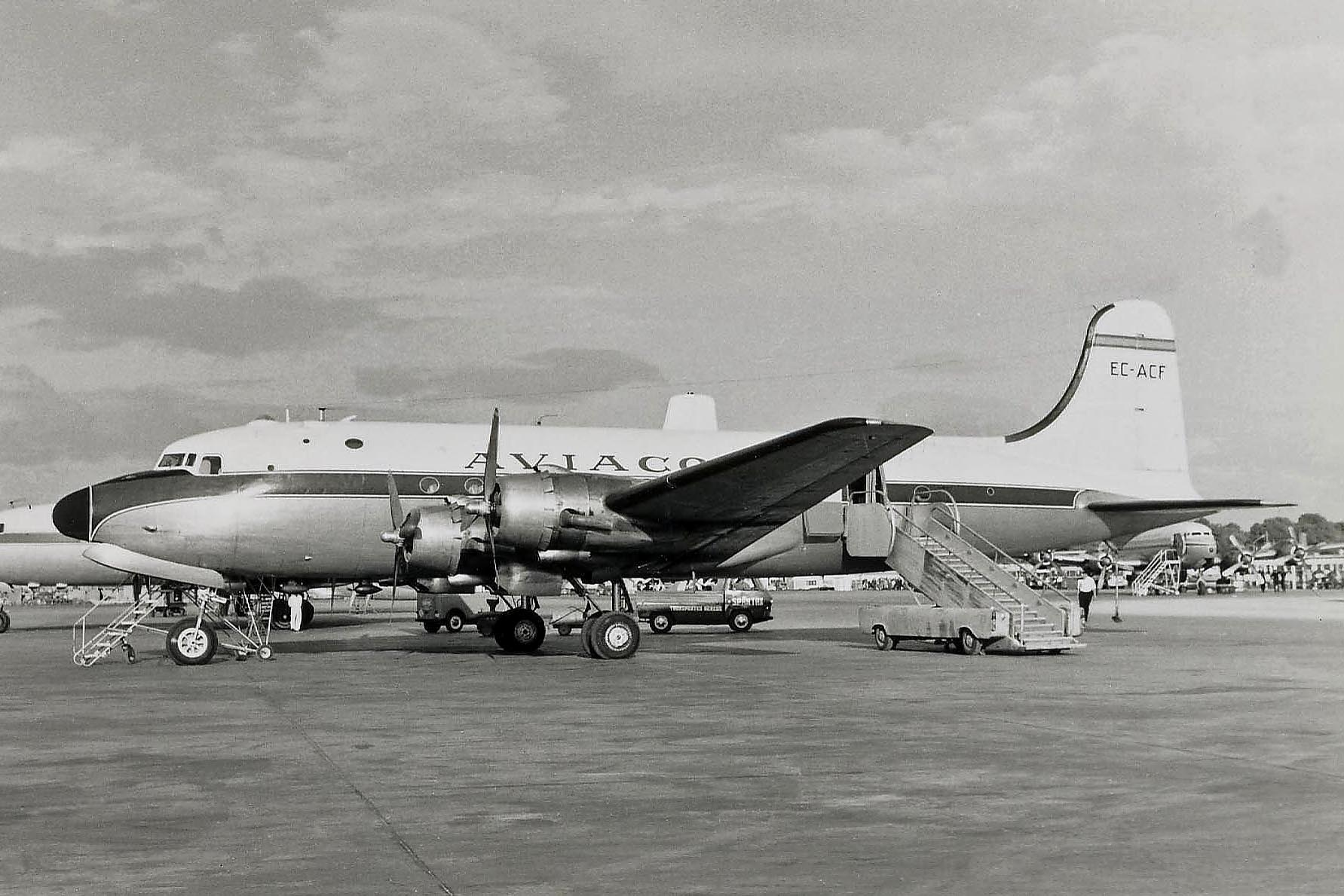
Aviaco C-54 EC-ACF at Palma de Mallorca (PMI).

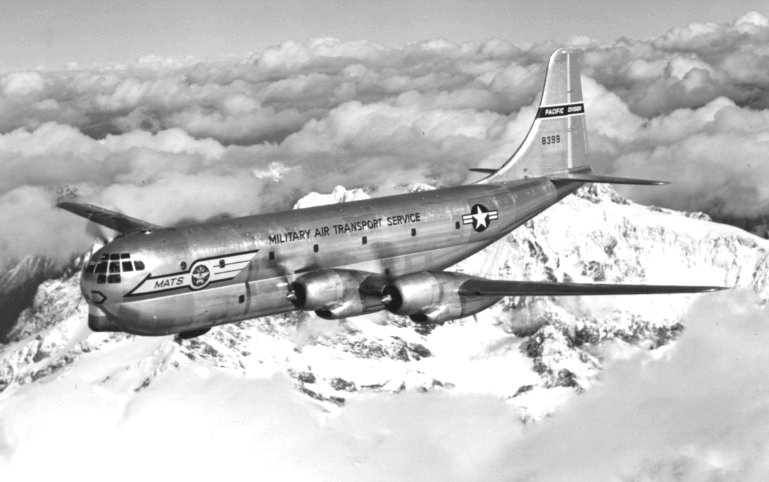
A Boeing C-97A Stratofreighter (s/n 48-399) in Military Air Transport Service (MATS) markings, c1940s.

- Undated – (United Kingdom) Airflight Limited – A British charter and cargo airline from 1948 to 1950, formed specifically for operations linked to the Berlin Airlift.
- Undated – (United States) Air Freight Forwarders Association – formally constituted by a group of certified U.S. air freight forwarders as key intermediaries handling cargo on behalf of airlines and shippers. This organization represented freight forwarders' interests relative to direct carriers and regulators (notably the U.S. Civil Aeronautics Board). As airline deregulation changed the industry, all-cargo airlines began to join the association as associate members. By the mid-1980s, these all-cargo airlines became the dominant segment of the association's activities, which was then restructured into the current Cargo Airline Association (CAA).
- February 18 – (Spain) Aviaco – initially formed as an air freight company operating six Bristol 170s.
- May 14 – (Argentina) Aerolíneas Argentinas, formally Aerolíneas Argentinas S.A. – the state-owned flag carrier of Argentina and the country's largest airline. The airline was created in 1949, from the merger of Aeroposta Argentina (AA), Aviación del Litoral Fluvial Argentino (ALFA), Flota Aérea Mercante Argentina (FAMA), and Zonas Oeste y Norte de Aerolíneas Argentinas (ZONDA), and started operations in December 1950.
- June 1 – (United States) Military Air Transport Service (MATS) – a now inactive Department of Defense Unified Command. MATS was a consolidation of the United States Navy's Naval Air Transport Service (NATS) and the United States Air Force's Air Transport Command (ATC) into a single joint command. It was inactivated and discontinued on 8 January 1966, superseded by the Air Force's Military Airlift Command (MAC) as a separate strategic airlift command, and it returned shore-based Navy cargo aircraft to Navy control as operational support airlift (OSA) aircraft.

== First flights ==
This decade, the following aircraft that were or would become important for air cargo and airmail history had their first flight:

=== 1940 ===
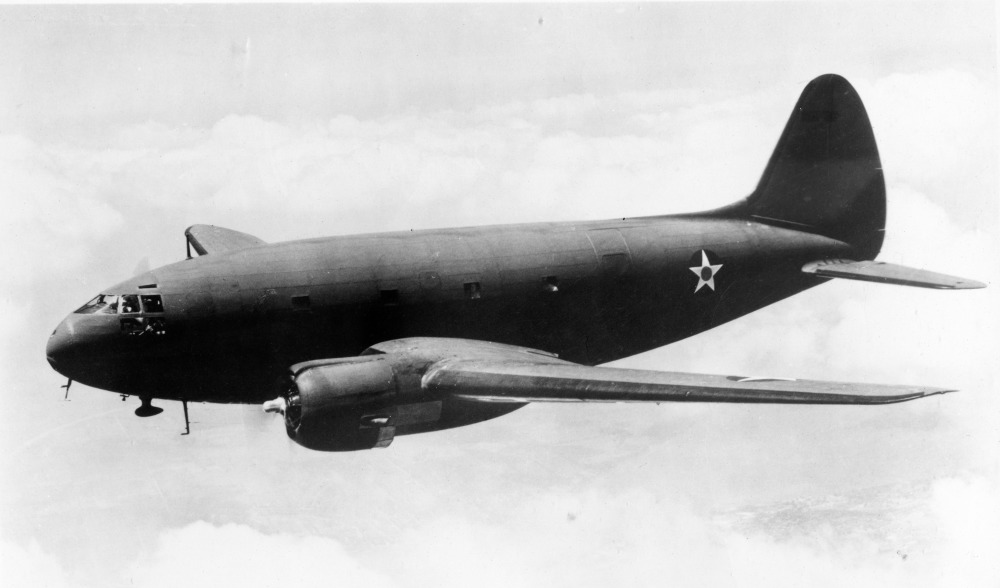
Curtiss C-46 Commando 41-5180 1942 (16139609402)

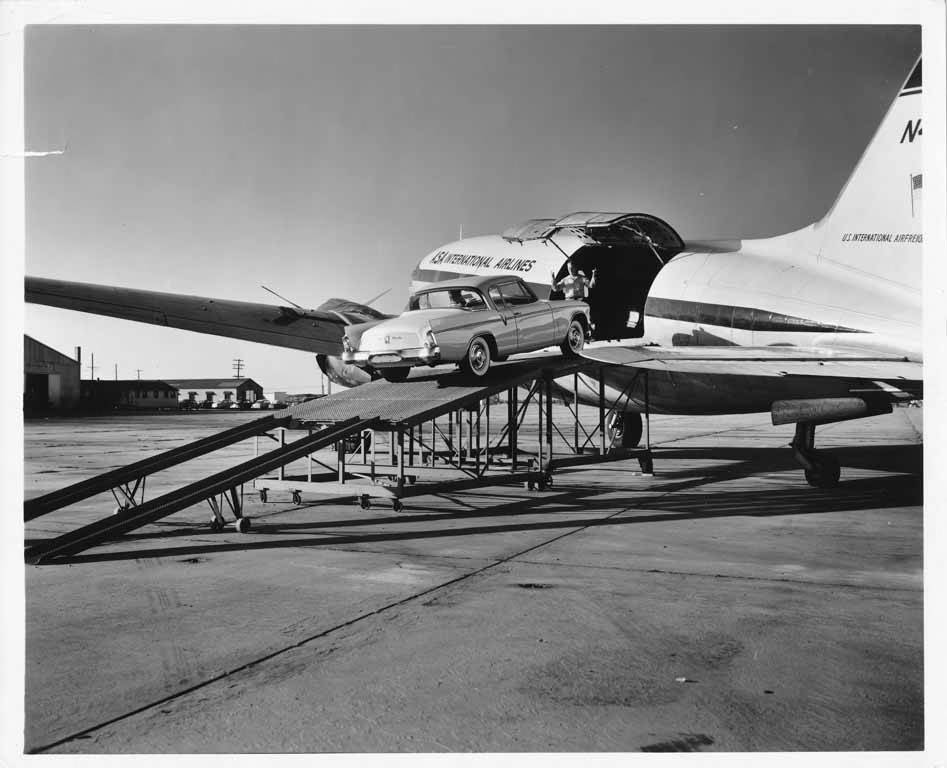
Aerovias Sud Americana (aka ASA International) C-46 Commando N4871V at St Petersburg Airport January 30 1956

- March 26 – (United States) Curtiss C-46 Commando – a low-wing, twin-engine aircraft derived from the Curtiss CW-20 pressurized high-altitude airliner design. It was used primarily as a cargo aircraft during World War II, with fold-down seating for military transport and some use in delivering paratroops. In total 3,200 were produced. Mainly deployed by the United States Army Air Forces, it also served the U.S. Navy/Marine Corps, which called it R5C. After World War II, a few surplus C-46 aircraft were briefly used in their original role as passenger airliners but the glut of surplus C-47s dominated the marketplace and the C-46 was soon relegated to cargo duty. The type continued in U.S. Air Force service in a secondary role until 1968. The C-46 continues in operation as a rugged cargo transport for arctic and remote locations with its service life extended into the 21st century.
- July 15 – (United States) Stinson L-1 Vigilant (company designation Model 74) - an American military liaison aircraft designed by the Stinson Aircraft Company of Wayne, Michigan and manufactured at the Vultee-Stinson factory in Nashville, Tennessee (in August 1940 Stinson became a division of Vultee Aircraft Corporation).[1] The aircraft was operated by the United States Army Air Corps as the O-49 until 1942. It was used in diverse roles a.o. transporting supplies.

=== 1941 ===
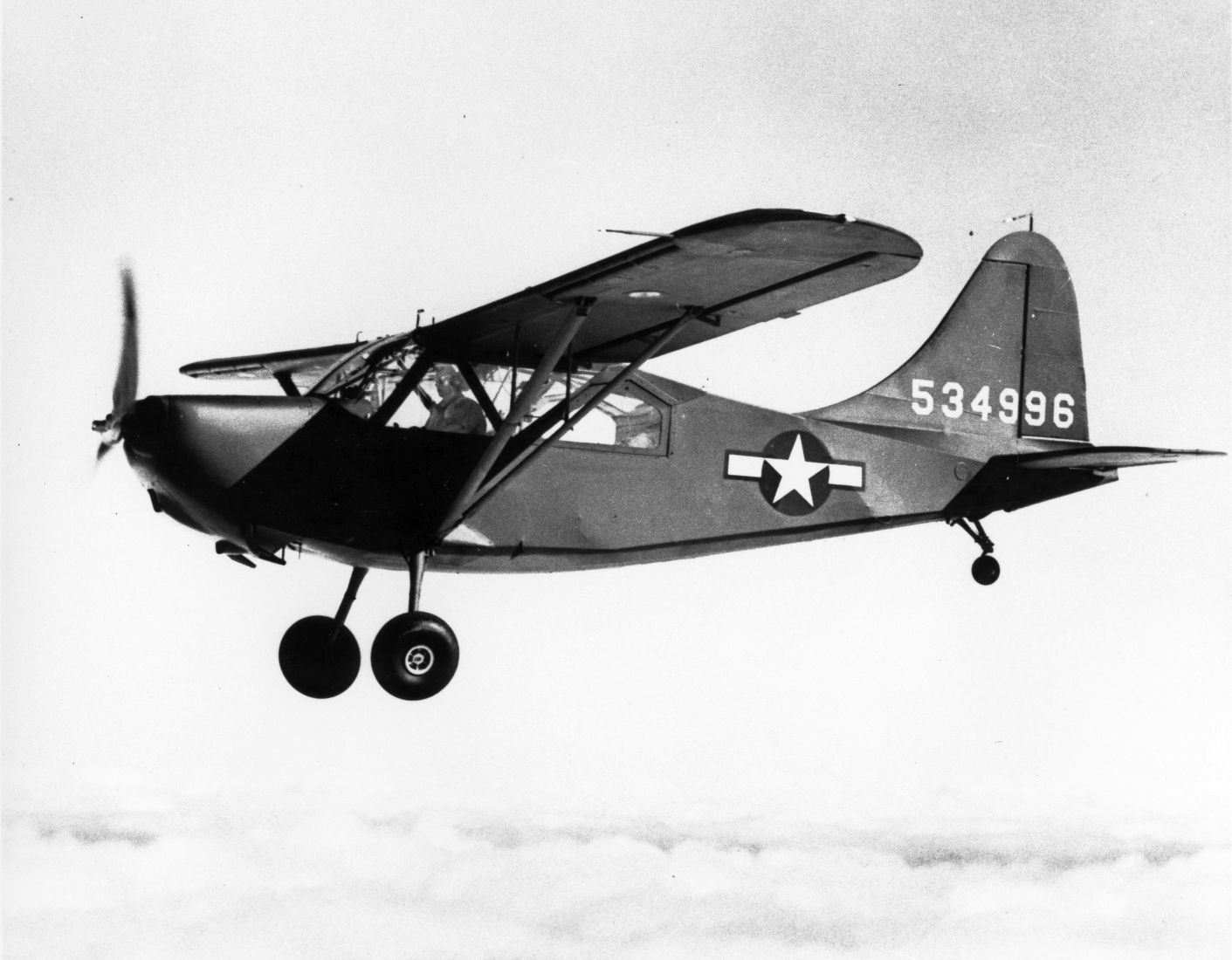
Stinson L-5 Sentinel, 1940's

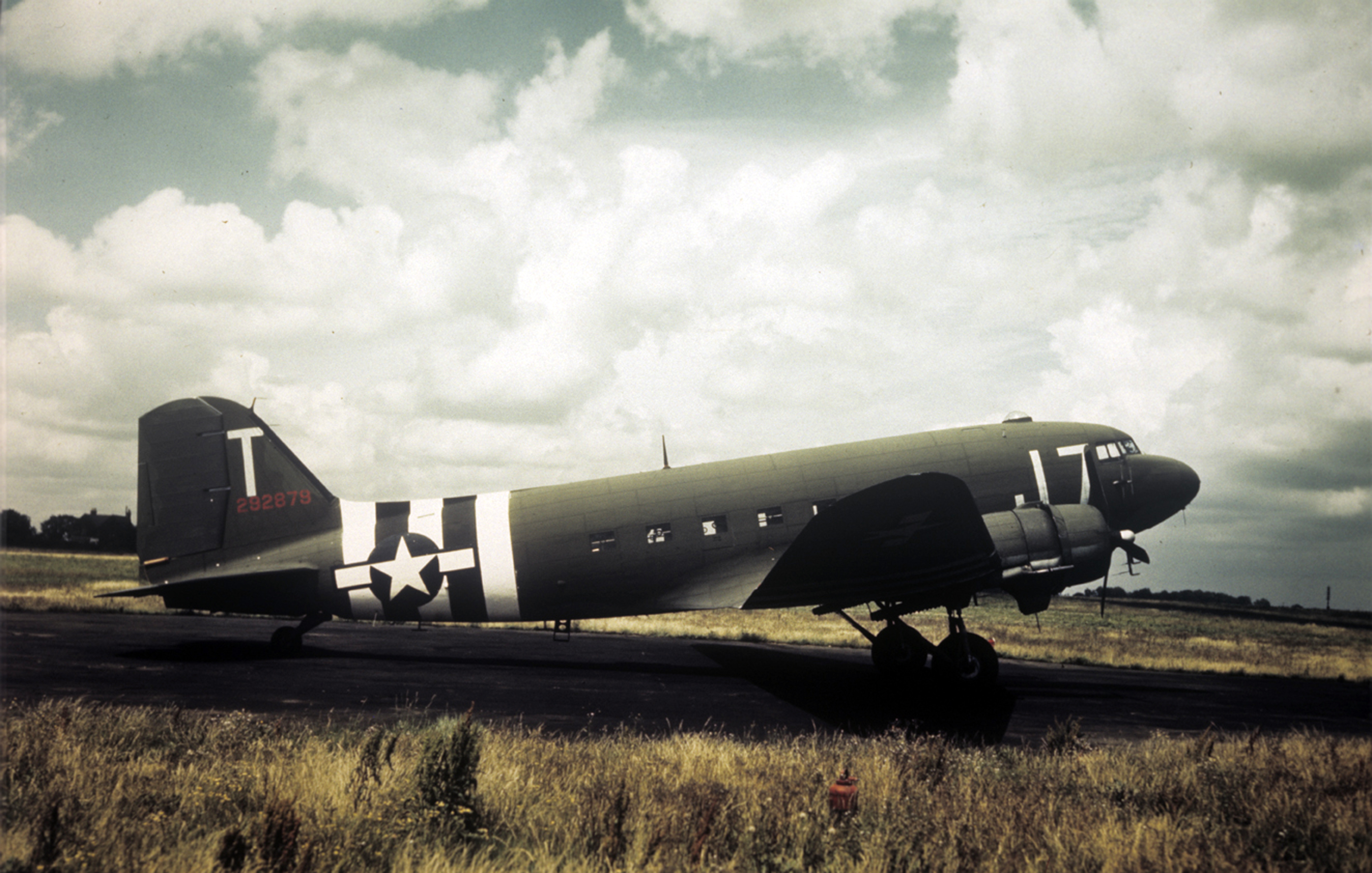
442d Troop Carrier Group Douglas C-47A-15-DK Skytrain 42-92879, in Normandy with invasion markings.

- June 28 – (United States) Stinson L-5 Sentinel – a World War II-era military liaison aircraft used by the United States Army Air Forces (USAAF), U.S. Army Ground Forces, U.S. Marine Corps and the British Royal Air Force. It was produced by the Stinson Division of the Vultee Aircraft Company (Consolidated-Vultee from mid-1943). Along with the Stinson L-1 Vigilant, the L-5 was the only other USAAF liaison aircraft that was exclusively built for military use and had no civilian counterpart other than the prototype. Capable of operating from short unimproved airstrips, the L-5 Sentinel delivered personnel, intelligence and supplies to the front line.
- December 23 – (United States) Douglas C-47 Skytrain or Dakota (RAF designation) is a military transport aircraft that was developed from the civilian Douglas DC-3 airliner. It was used extensively by the Allies during World War II. During the war the C-47 was used for troop transport, cargo, paratrooper drops, glider towing, and military cargo parachute drops. The C-47 remained in front-line service with various military operators for many years. It was produced in approximately triple the numbers of the larger, much heavier payload Curtiss C-46 Commando, which filled a similar role for the U.S. military. Approximately 100 countries' armed forces have operated the C-47 with over 60 variants of the aircraft produced. As with the civilian DC-3, the C-47 remains in service, over 80 years after the type's introduction.

=== 1942 ===
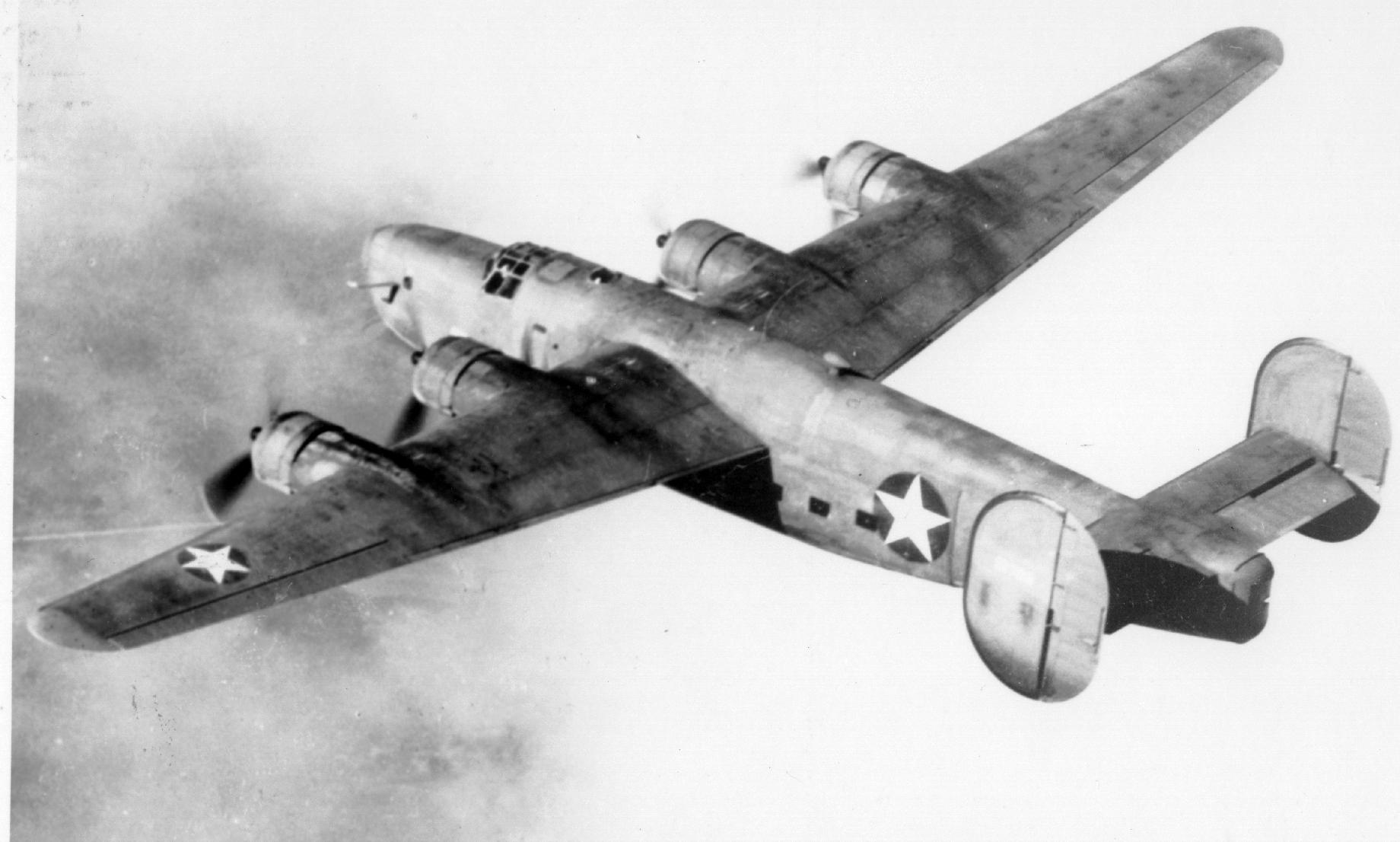
Consolidated C-87 Liberator Express

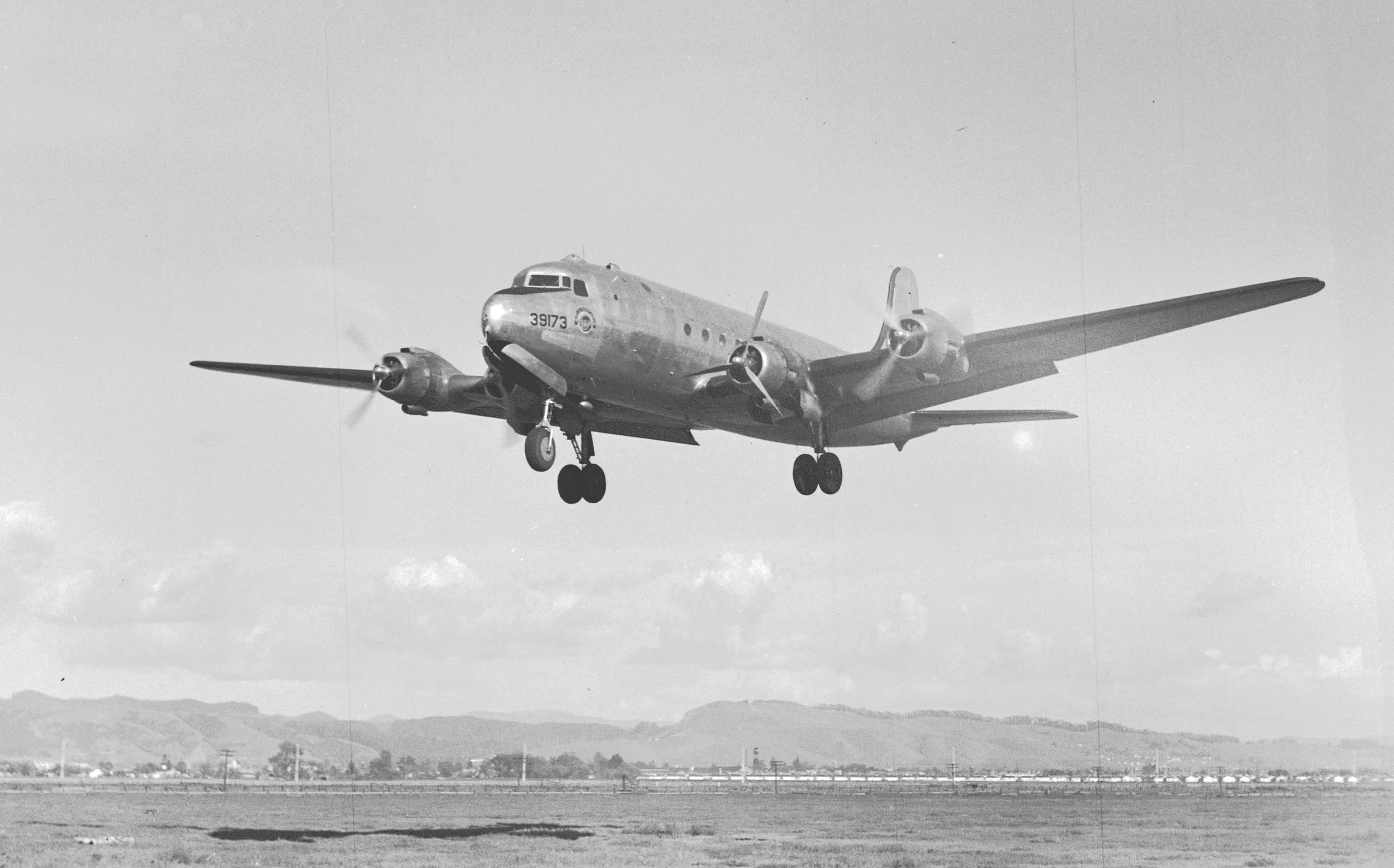
Douglas R5D-1 (39173) NATS

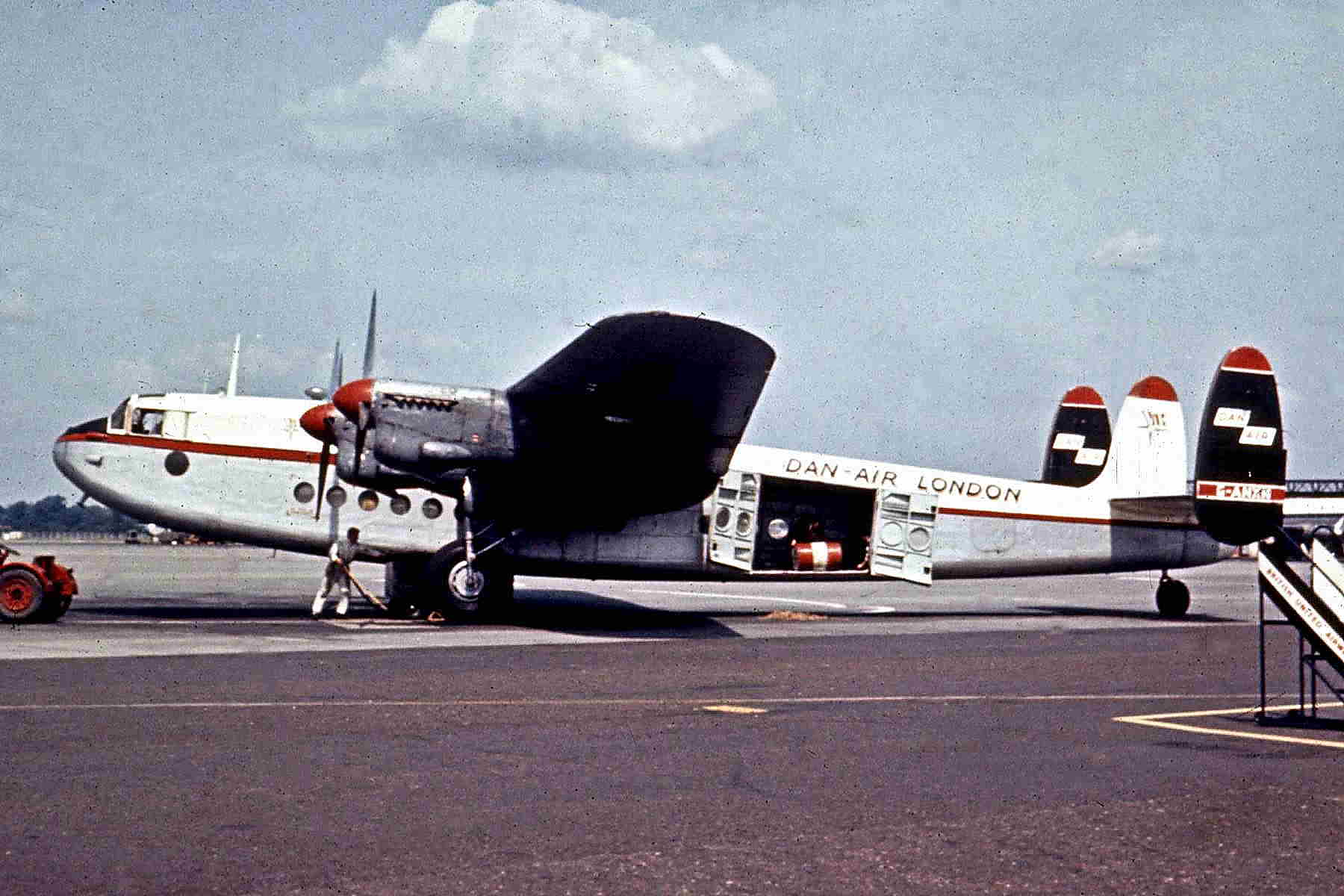
Avro York C.1 G-ANXN, Dan Air Services, LGW, 03 MAR 64

- Undated – (United States) Consolidated C-87 Liberator Express – a transport derivative of the B-24 Liberator heavy bomber built during World War II for the United States Army Air Forces. A total of 287 C-87s were delivered by Consolidated Aircraft from its plant in Fort Worth, Texas. The C-87 had a much longer range and higher service ceiling, making it a better choice for over-water transport flights, but its hurried conversion from a dedicated bomber design resulted in inevitable compromises that affected its reliability in service.
- February 14 – (United States) Douglas DC-4, military: C-54 / R5D Skymaster – an American four-engined (piston), propeller-driven airliner developed by the Douglas Aircraft Company. Military versions of the plane served during World War II, in the Berlin Airlift and into the 1960s. From 1945, many civil airlines operated the DC-4 worldwide.
- March 27 – (United Kingdom) General Aircraft Limited GAL.49 Hamilcar or Hamilcar Mark I – a large British military glider produced during the Second World War, which was designed to carry heavy cargo, such as the Tetrarch or M22 Locust light tank. Hamilcars were used on three occasions, and only in support of British airborne forces.
- July 5 – (United Kingdom) Avro York – a British transport aircraft developed by Avro during the Second World War. The design was derived from the Avro Lancaster heavy bomber, several sections of the York and Lancaster being identical. Due to the importance of Lancaster production, York output proceeded slowly until 1944, after which a higher priority was placed upon transport aircraft. The York saw service in military and civilian roles with various operators between 1943 and 1964. In civilian service, British South American Airways (BSAA) and British Overseas Airways Corporation (BOAC) were the largest users of the type on passenger/mail routes and/or for cargo. In military service, large numbers of Yorks were used for air-supply missions during the Berlin Blockade 1948–49.

=== 1943 ===
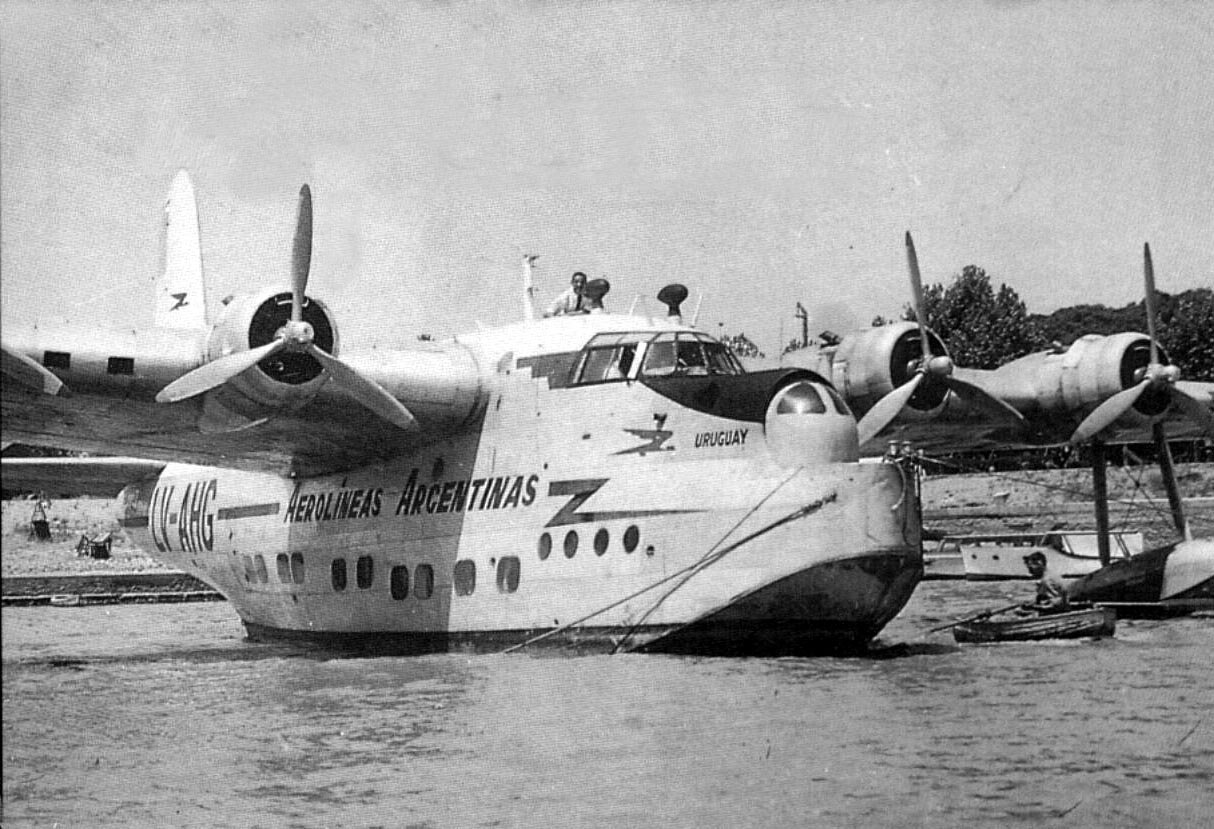
Short S.25 Sunderland Sandringham (33563879946)

- January 3 – (United Kingdom) Short S.25 Sandringham – a British civilian flying boat designed and originally produced by Short Brothers. They were produced as conversions of the widely used Short Sunderland, a military flying boat that was commonly used as a maritime patrol aircraft. Around the end of World War II, after having Shorts was keen to produce a more refined and capable conversion of the Sunderland; the first prototype of which, performed its maiden flight during November 1945, became known as the Sandringham I.

=== 1944 ===
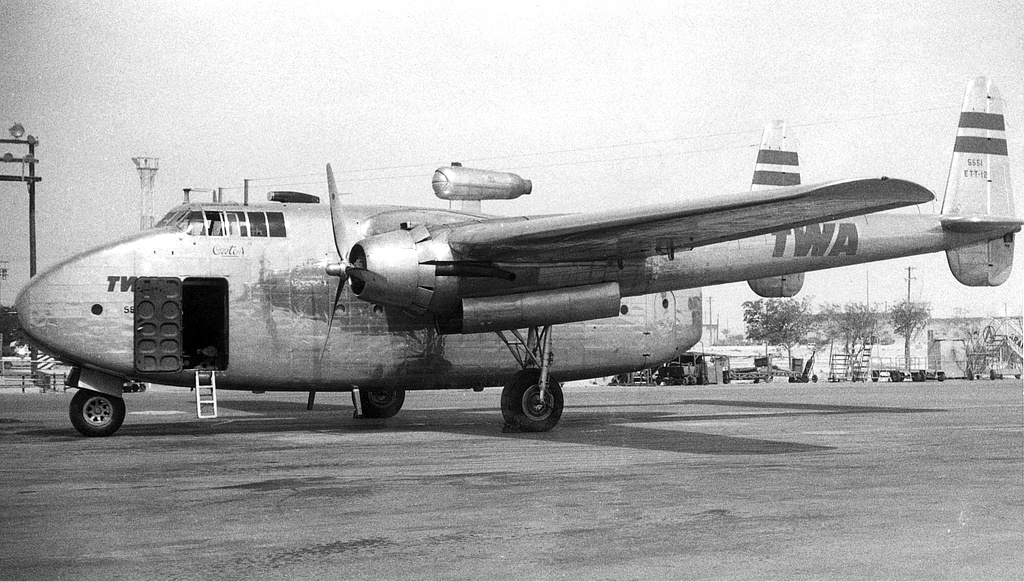
Trans World Airlines Fairchild C-82A Packet, Fleet No. 5551, at Dhahran, Saudi Arabia, to change engine on a grounded TWA Connie, 1959.

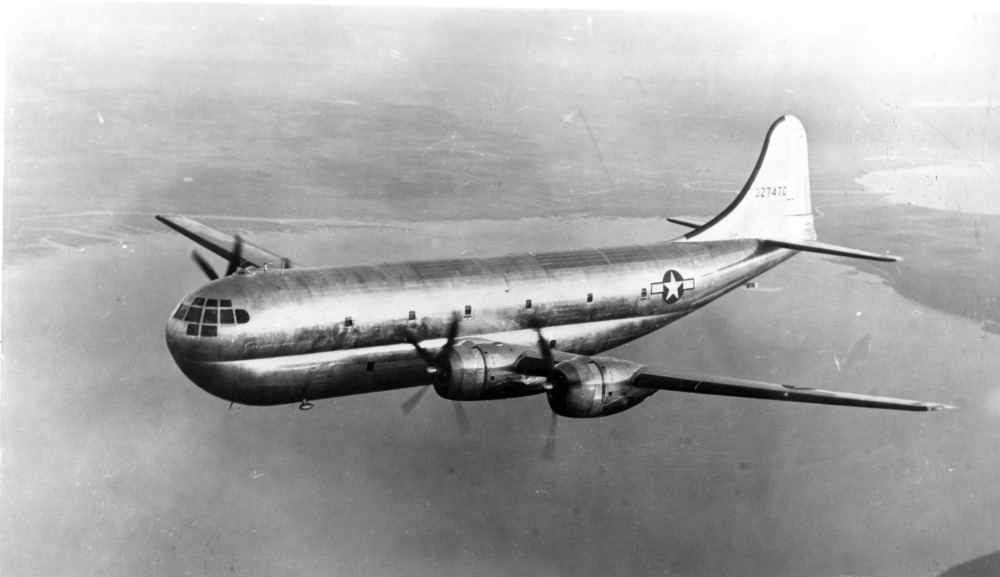
Stratofreighter prototype Boeing XC-97 43-27470

- September 10 – (United States) Fairchild C-82 Packet – a twin-engine, twin-boom cargo aircraft designed and built by Fairchild Aircraft. It was used briefly by the United States Army Air Forces and the successor United States Air Force following World War II. It featured a rear-loading ramp with wide doors and an empennage set 14 feet (4.3 m) off the ground that permitted trucks and trailers to back up to the doors without obstruction. After the C-82A became surplus to United States Air Force requirements, small numbers were sold to civilian operators in Brazil, Chile, Mexico and the United States and these were utilized for many years as rugged freight aircraft, capable of carrying bulky items of cargo. The last example was retired in the late 1980s.
- November 9 – (United States) Boeing C-97 Stratofreighter – a long-range heavy military cargo aircraft developed from the B-29 and B-50 bombers. The C-97 had clamshell doors under its tail so that two retractable ramps could be used to drive in cargo, but it was not a tactical airlifter able to deliver to primitive forward bases. The doors could not be opened in flight, but could be removed to carry out air drops. The C-97 had a useful payload of 35,000 lb (16,000 kg), which could include two 2½-ton trucks, towed artillery, or light tracked vehicles such as the M56 Scorpion. The C-97 featured cabin pressurization, which made long flights more comfortable.

=== 1945 ===
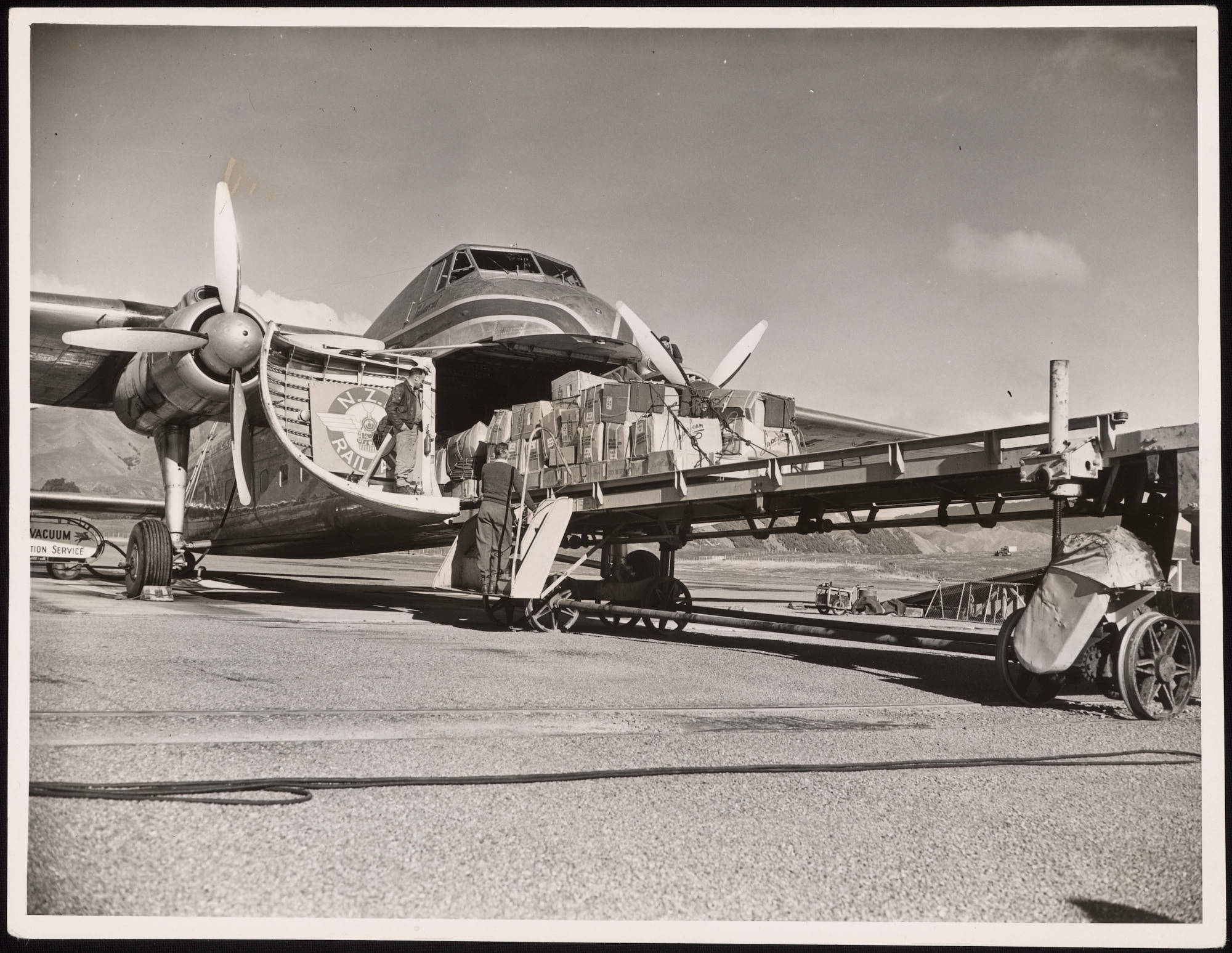
The automatic loading of a Bristol Type 170 Freighter at Paraparaumu, between 1956 and 1969 (Auckland Libraries Heritage Collections)

- Undated – (United States) Stinson L-13 (sometimes known as the Grasshopper) – a US military utility aircraft. For resale into the private market, some units were converted for civil bush flying use.
- September 5 – (United States) Douglas C-74 Globemaster – a heavy-lift cargo aircraft built by the Douglas Aircraft Company in Long Beach, California. The aircraft was developed after the Japanese attack on Pearl Harbor. The long distances across the Atlantic and, especially, Pacific oceans to combat areas indicated a need for a transoceanic heavy-lift military transport aircraft. Douglas Aircraft Company responded in 1942 with a giant four-engined design. Development and production modifications issues with the aircraft caused the first flight to be delayed until 5 September 1945, after both V-J Day (marking the end of conflict in World War II, on August 15, 1945) and formal surrender on September 2. Total production was limited to 14 aircraft when the wartime contract was cancelled in January 1946.
- December 2 – (United Kingdom) Bristol Type 170 Freighter – a British twin-engine aircraft designed and built by the Bristol Aeroplane Company as both a freighter and airliner. Its best known use was as an air ferry to carry cars and their passengers over relatively short distances. A passenger-only version was also produced, known as the Wayfarer. It was powered by twin 2000 hp 14-cylinder piston engines matched to 4-bladed propellers. It had wide opening clamshell doors on the nose, and with a high-set flight deck, this allowed full access to the cargo bay, including the ability to drive a vehicle directly in via a ramp.

=== 1946 ===
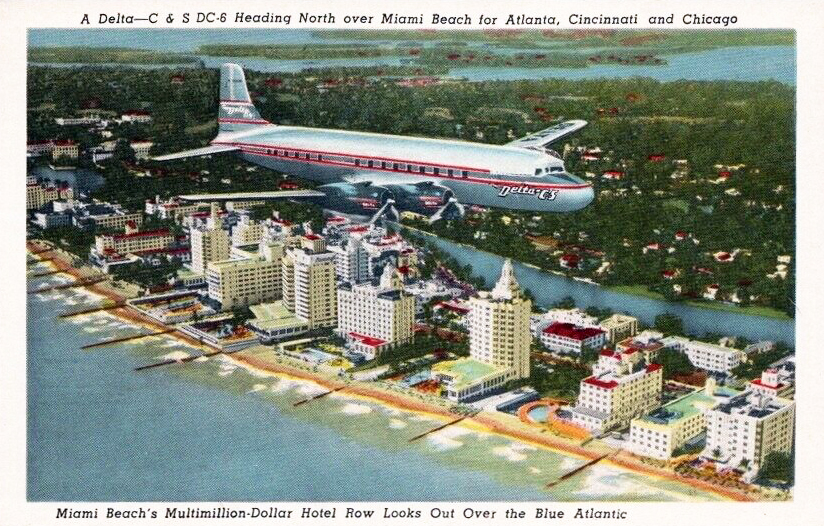
A Delta DC-6 over Miami Beach, Florida – postcard 1953

- February 15 – (United States) Douglas DC-6 – a piston-powered airliner and cargo aircraft built by the Douglas Aircraft Company from 1946 to 1958. Originally intended as a military transport near the end of World War II, Douglas reworked it after the war to compete with the Lockheed Constellation in the long-range commercial transport market. Douglas built over 700, and many still fly in cargo, military, and wildfire control roles.

=== 1947 ===
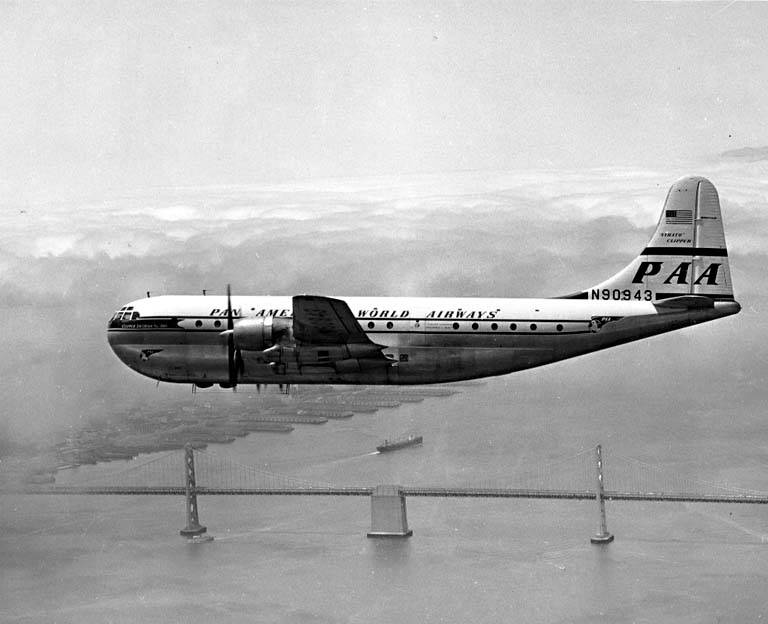
Pan American Airways Boeing 377 Stratocruiser over San Francisco-Oakland Bay Bridge ca. 1950.

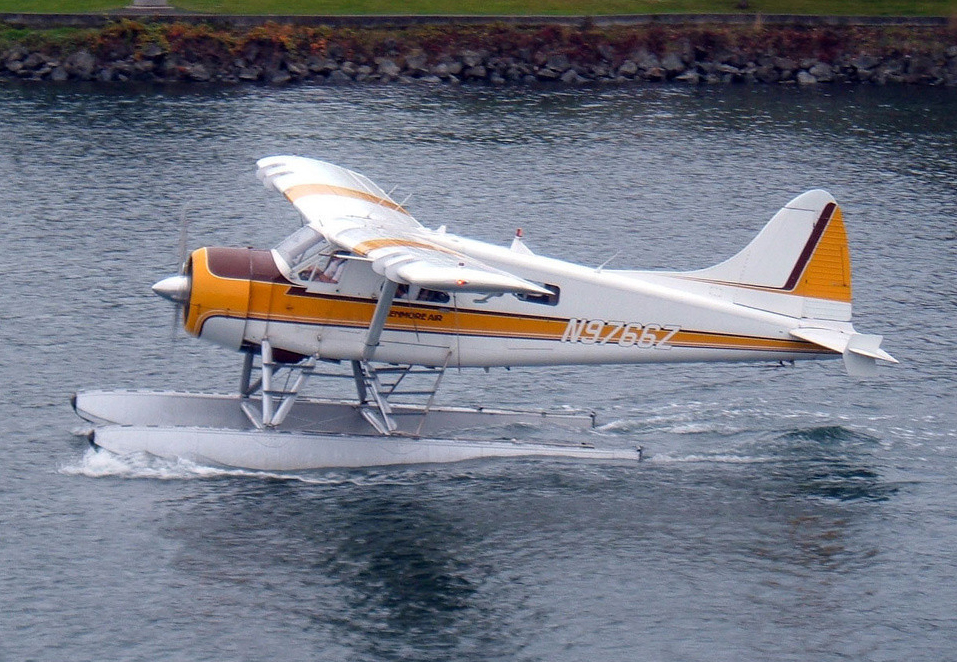
De Havilland Canada DHC-2 Beaver floatplane from 1953.

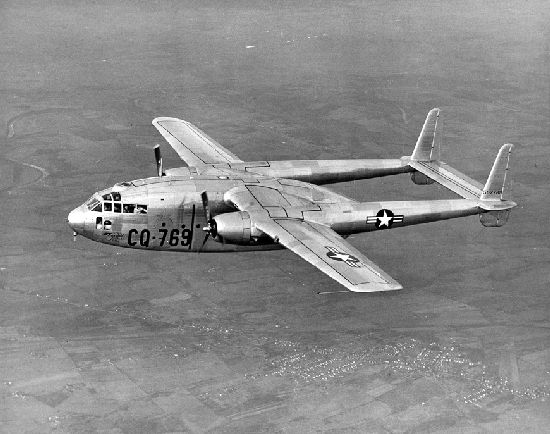
Fairchild C-119 Flying Boxcar in flight, 10 November 1948

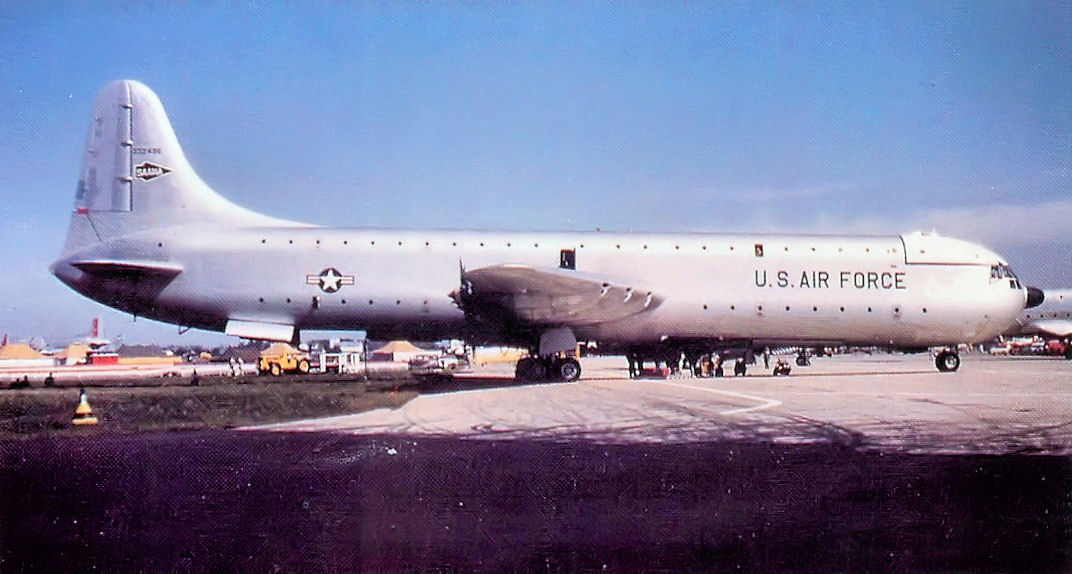
Convair XC-99 attached to the MATS 1700th Air Transport Group, Kelly AFB, Texas, 1954.

- July 8 – (United States) Boeing 377 Stratocruiser – a large long-range airliner developed from the C-97 Stratofreighter military transport, itself a derivative of the B-29 Superfortress. Design features included passenger decks and a pressurized cabin. It could carry up to 100 passengers on the main deck plus 14 in the lower deck lounge; typical seating was for 63 or 84 passengers or 28 berthed and five seated passengers. Although primarily a passenger aircraft, the Stratocruiser's large fuselage and spare capacity laid groundwork for future cargo conversions and higher-volume mail/cargo carriage on transoceanic routes. Several large cargo conversions were made based on the 377, the first was the Pregnant Guppy, followed by the Super Guppy, and finally the Mini Guppy. They had an extension to the top of the fuselage to enable them to carry large aircraft parts between manufacturing sites.
- August 16 – (Canada) De Havilland Canada DHC-2 Beaver is a single-engined high-wing propeller-driven short takeoff and landing (STOL) aircraft developed and manufactured by De Havilland Canada. It has been primarily operated as a land/float bush plane and has been used for a wide variety of utility roles, such as cargo and passenger hauling, aerial application (crop dusting and aerial topdressing), and other civil aviation duties.
- November 17 – (United States) Fairchild C-119 Flying Boxcar (Navy and Marine Corps designation R4Q) – an American military transport aircraft developed from the World War II-era Fairchild C-82 Packet, designed to carry cargo, personnel, litter patients, and mechanized equipment, and to drop cargo and troops by parachute. By the time production ceased in 1955, more than 1,100 had been built.
- November 24 – (United States) Convair XC-99, AF Ser. No. 43-52436 – a prototype heavy cargo aircraft built by Convair for the United States Air Force. It was the largest land-based piston engine transport aircraft ever built, and was developed from the Convair B-36 Peacemaker bomber, sharing the wings and some other structures with it. The first flight was on 24 November 1947 in San Diego, California, and after testing it was delivered to the Air Force on 26 May 1949. Design capacity of the XC-99 was 100,000 lb (45,000 kg) of cargo or 400 fully equipped soldiers on its double cargo decks. The engines face rearward in a pusher configuration. In 1951, the aircraft was retrofitted with more powerful engines, landing gear was strengthened and a cargo-loading system installed, including an internal elevator. Bins were developed to enable quick loading of the aircraft – it was estimated the aircraft could be loaded in as little as 30 minutes.

== Context ==
The air cargo and airmail events of this decade took place within the following historical context:

- 1940s
  - 1940–1945 – World War II
  - 1940–1945 – Aviation in World War II
- 1940
- 1940 in aviation
- 1941
- 1941 in aviation
- 1942
- 1942 in aviation
- 1943
- 1943 in aviation
- 1944
- 1944 in aviation
- 1945
- 1945 in aviation
- 1946
- 1946 in aviation
- 1947
- 1947 in aviation
  - September 22 – (United States-United Kingdom) A USAF C-54 achieved a fully automatic flight from Newfoundland to the UK, demonstrating navigational and operational advances supportive of future transatlantic cargo reliability.
- 1948
- 1948 in aviation
- 1949
- 1949 in aviation
  - July 27 – (United Kingdom) First flight of the de Havilland Comet, the world's first commercial jet airliner.

== Pictures from the decade ==
air cargo and airmail in the decade 1940-1949

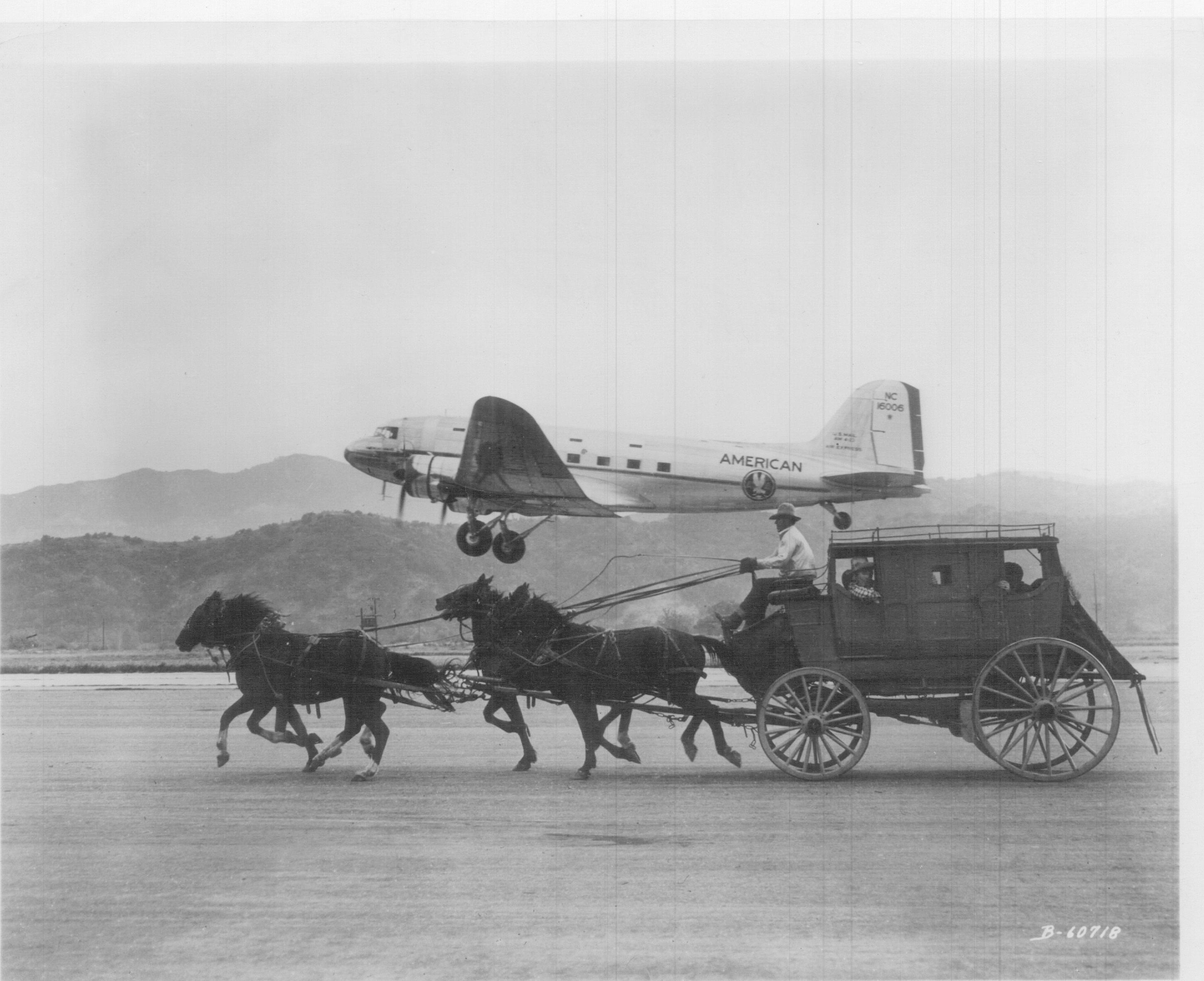
A Douglas DC-3 of American Airlines and a stagecoach symbolzing the progress of passenger and mail transport c1940.

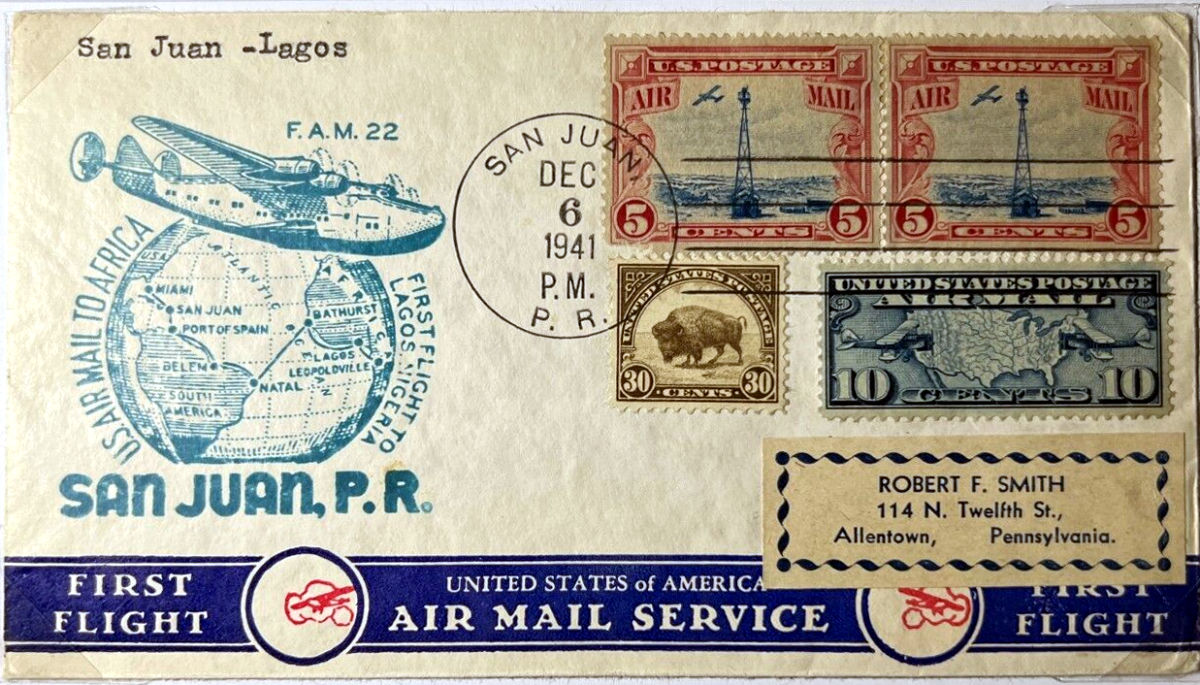
First Airmail Flight Commemorative Cover - Allentown PA, USA, 1941.

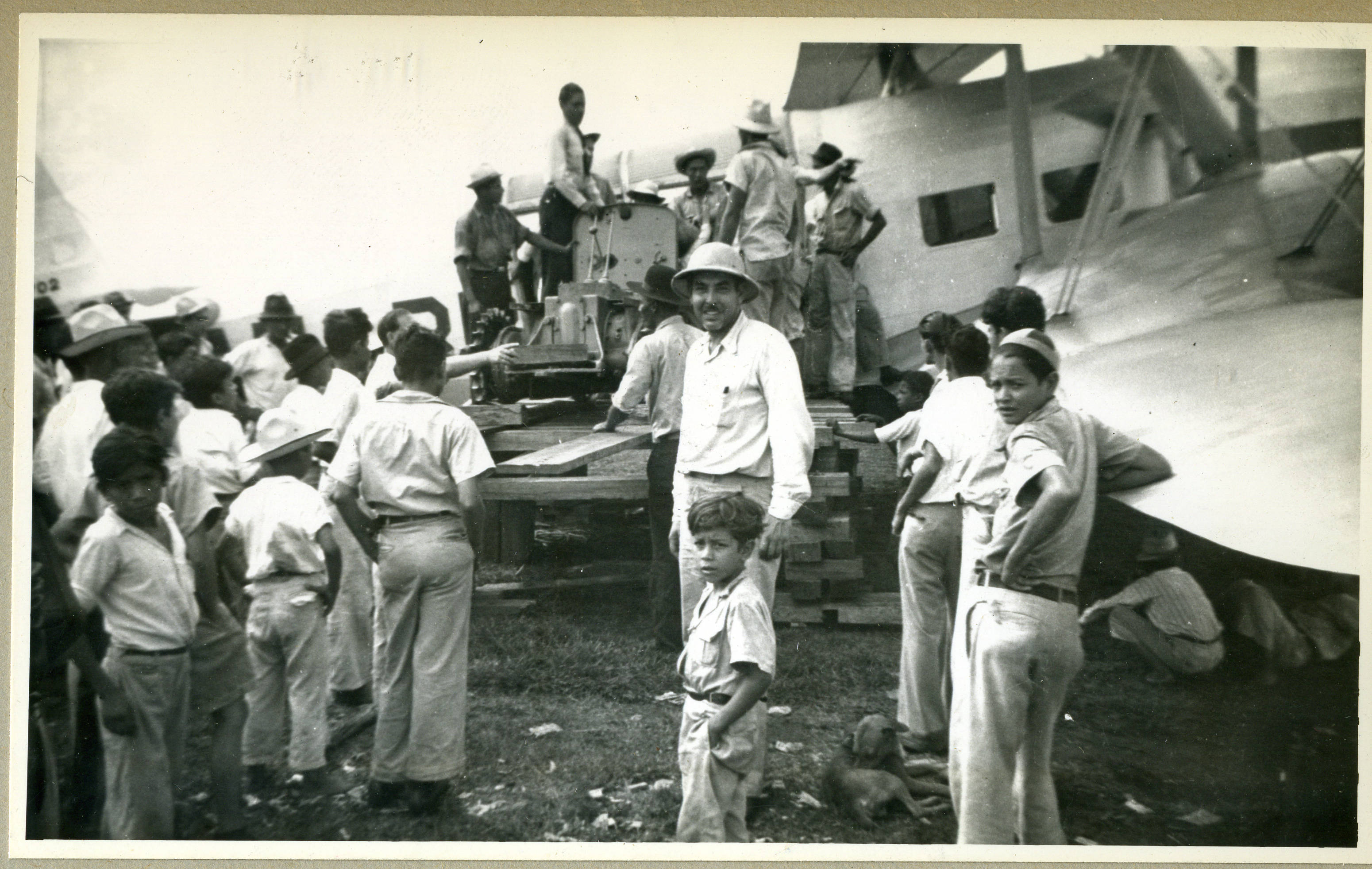
Unloading equipment from a TACA plane. Construction of the Inter-American Highway in Central Americabetween circa 1940 and circa 1943.

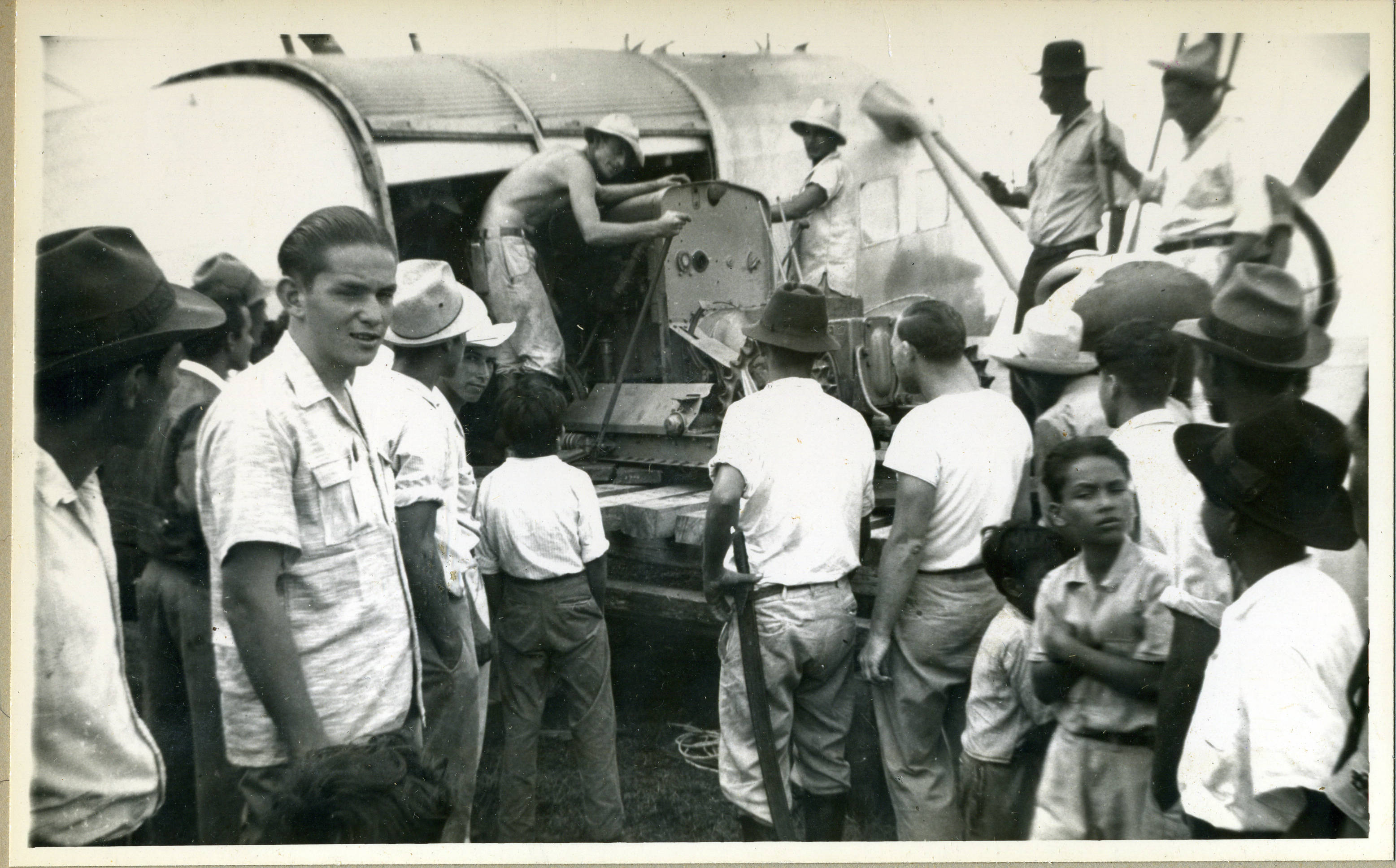
Unloading equipment from a TACA plane. Construction of the Inter-American Highway in Central Americabetween circa 1940 and circa 1943.

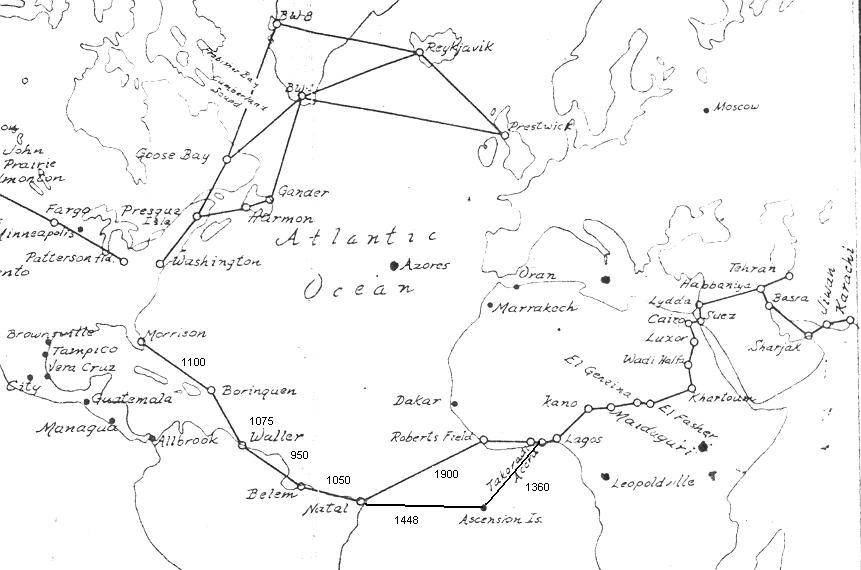
WW2 Ferry Command Air Routes 1942.

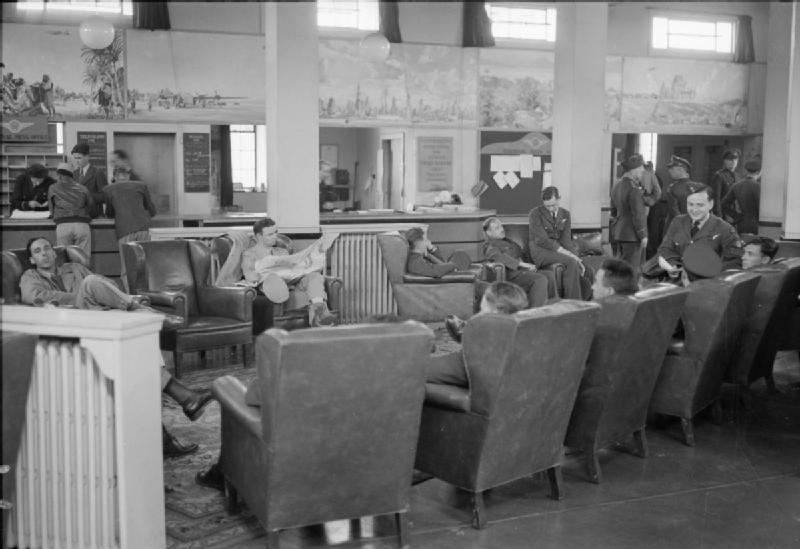
British (RAF Ferry Command) and American (USAAC Ferrying Command) transport aircrews relax in the lounge at Prestwick, Ayrshire. Date between 1939 and 1945.

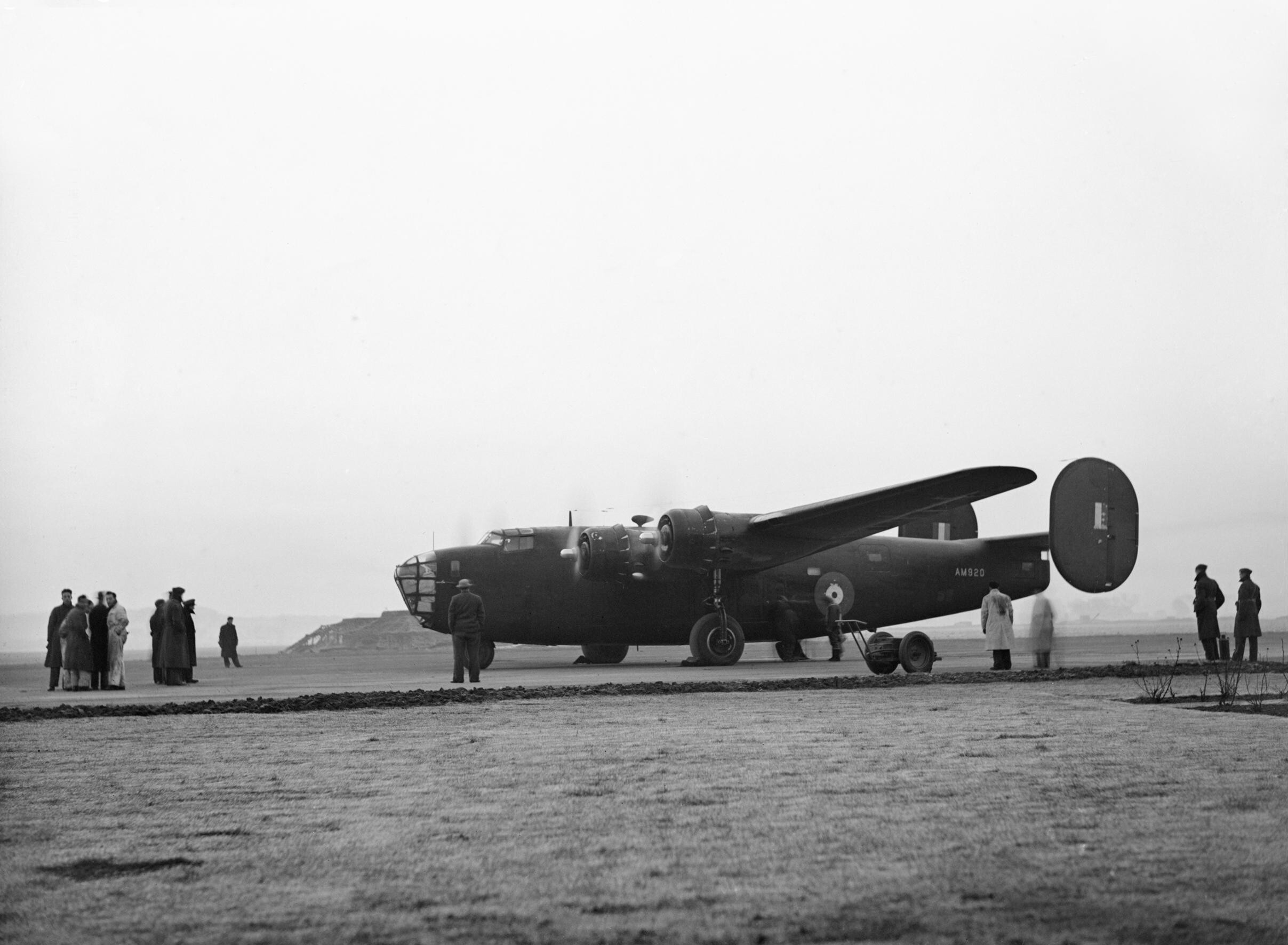
Royal Air Force Ferry Command. Warming up the engines of a Consolidated Liberator Mark I, AM920, at Prestwick, Ayrshire, in readiness for a dawn start to an Atlantic ferry crossing. This aircraft was passed to BOAC in August 1942, serving as G-AGHG.

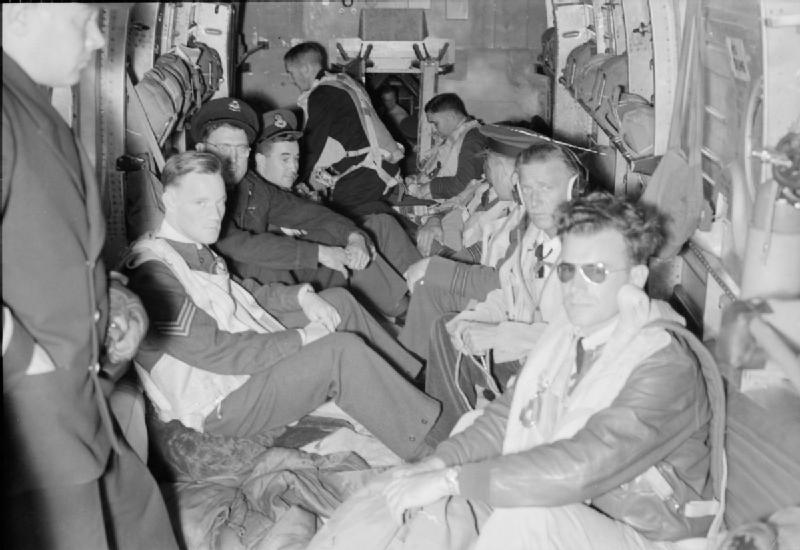
Royal Air Force Ferry Command, 1941-1943. Service and civilian ferry pilots being conveyed to Canada on board a Consolidated Liberator of the North Atlantic Return Ferry Service, flying from Prestwick, Ayrshire. Date between 1939 and 1945.

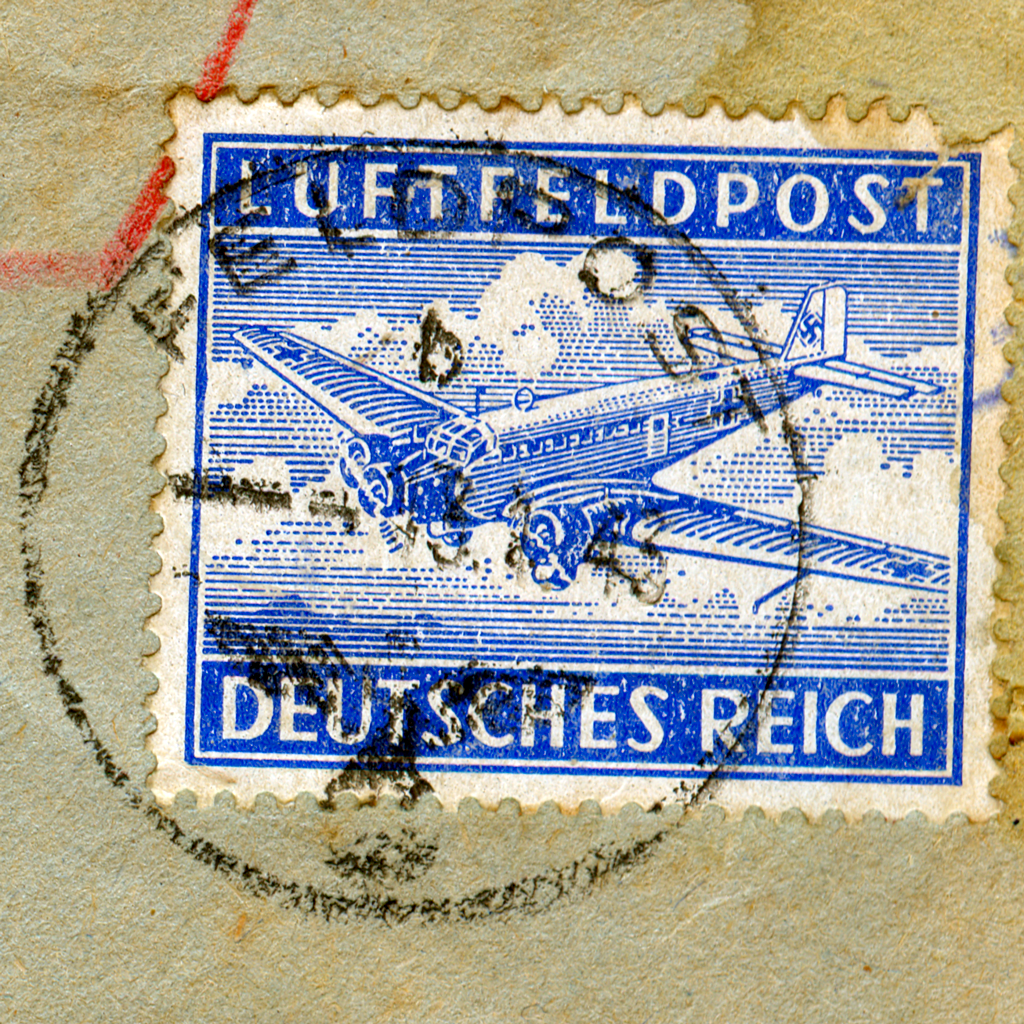
LUFTFELDPOST Blue airmail stamp postmarked '13.1.43', presumably in Rostov-on-Don.

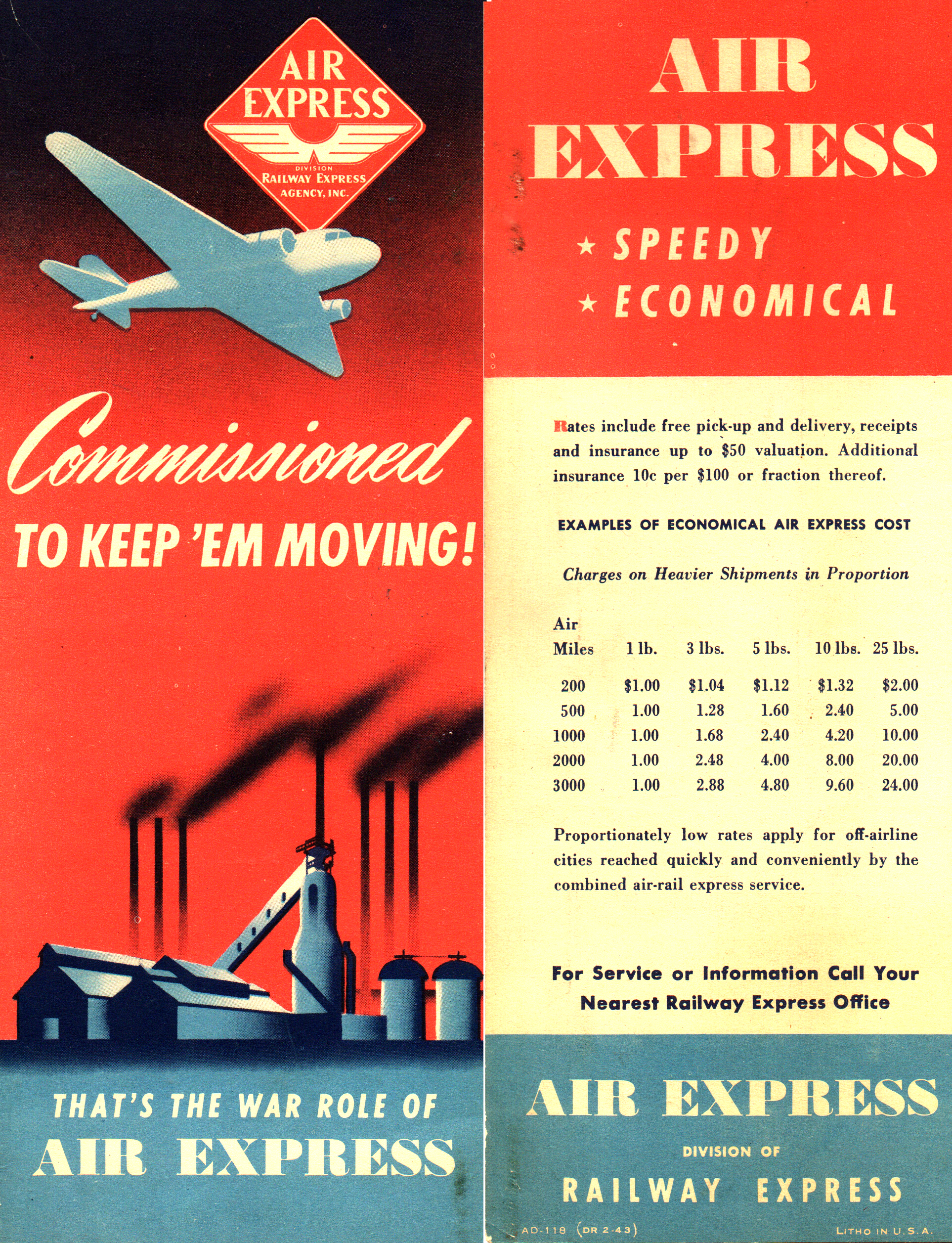
Railway Express Agency (REA) Air Express Brochure, February 1943.

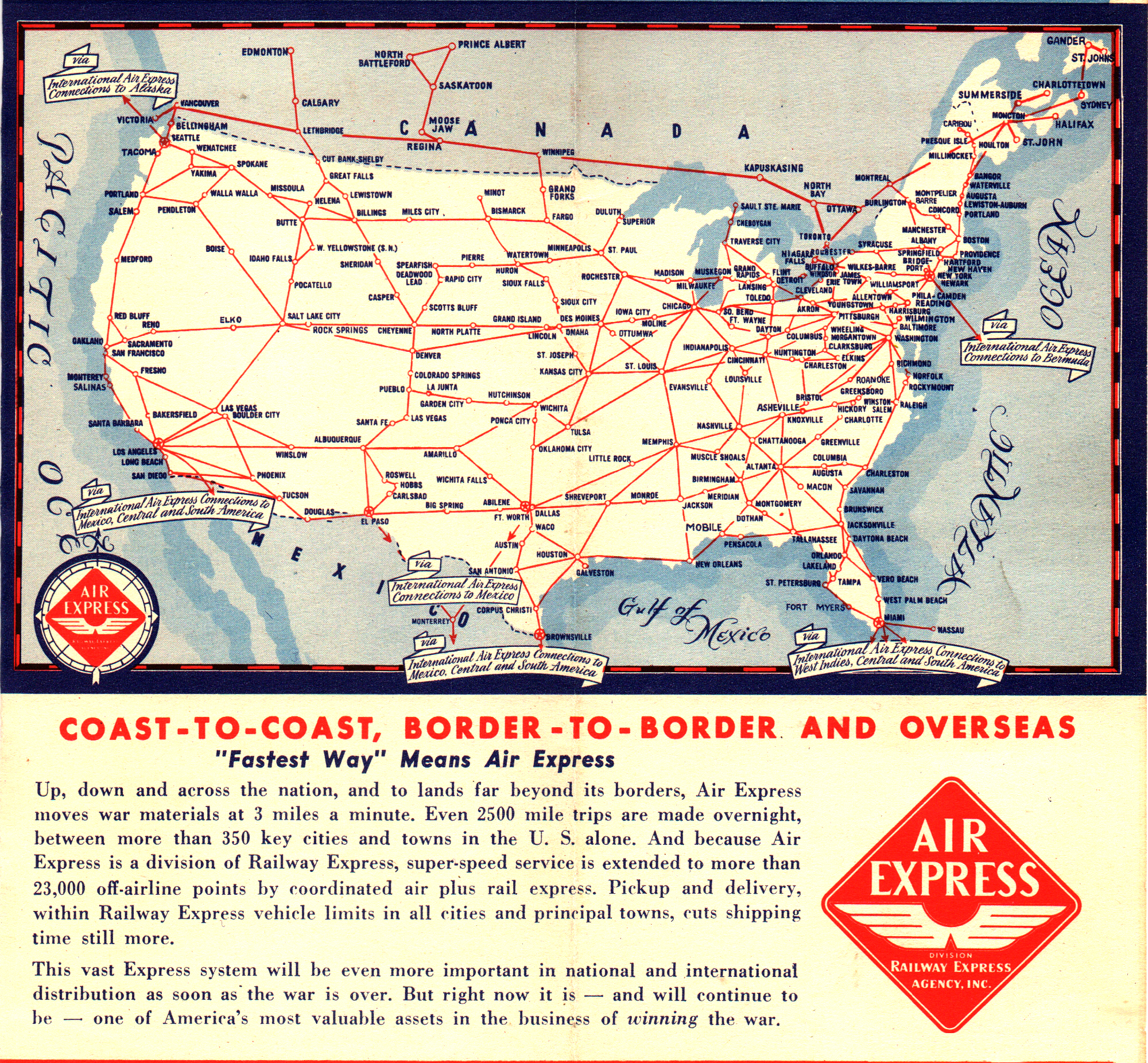
Railway Express Agency (REA) Air Express system map from brochure, February 1943.

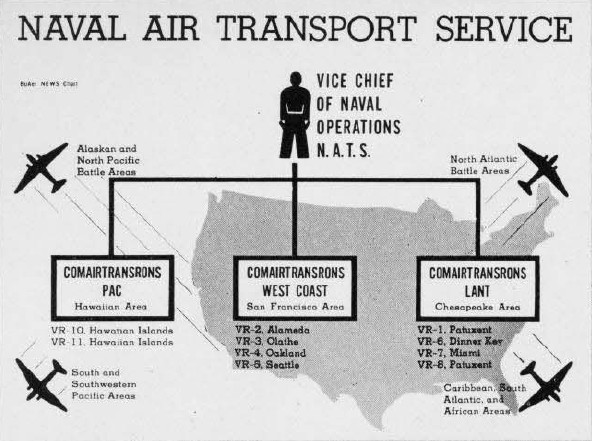
Naval Air Transport Service (NATS) chart NAN 15 Aug 43.

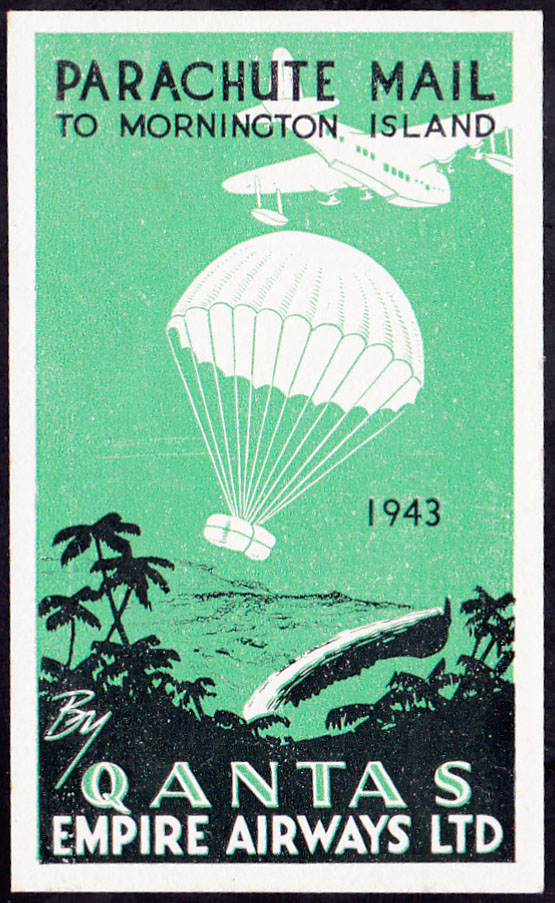
A vignette for attaching to mail on the Christmas mail drop to the Mornington Island Mission in 1943.

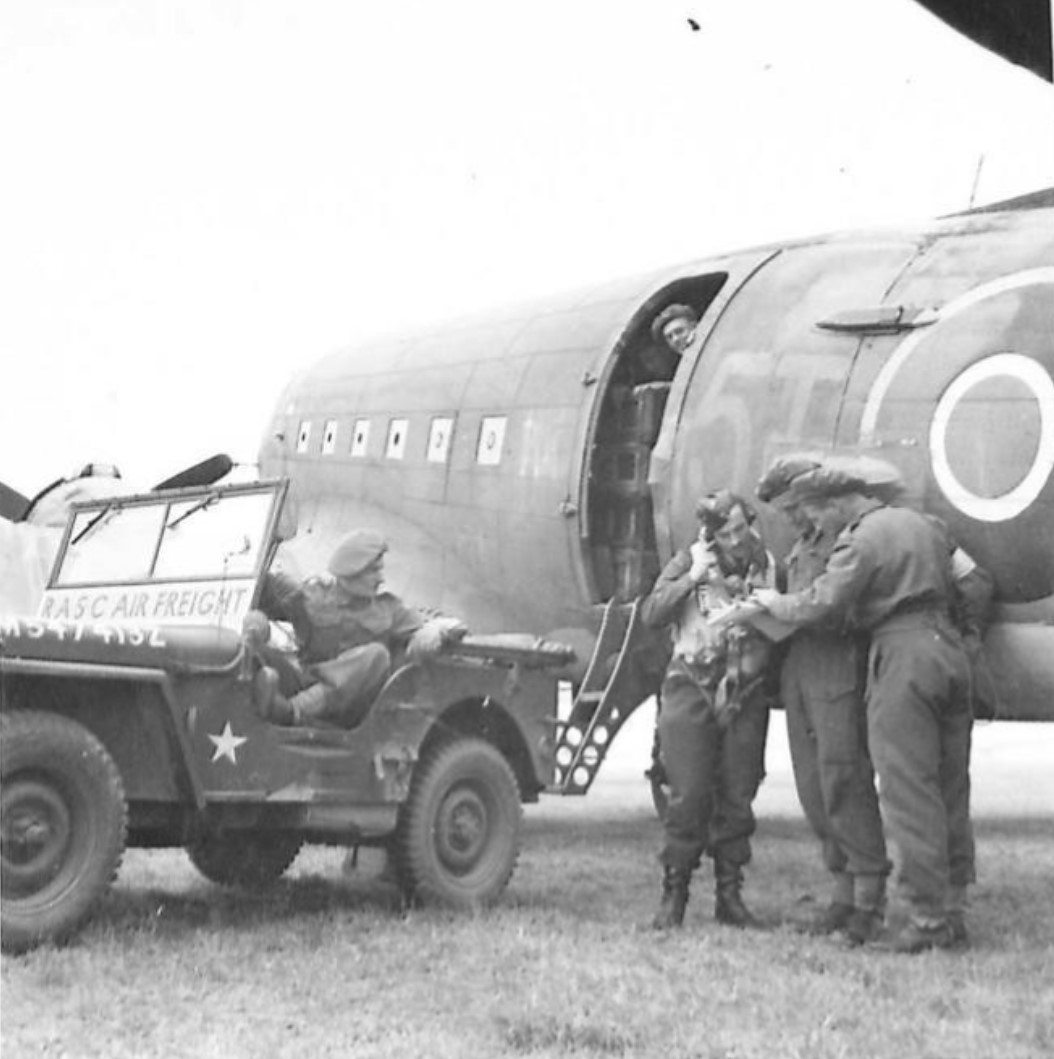
F.0. Clarkson, G.T., R.A.F., 233 Sqd. of Ellesmere Port, hands his load chit to Spl.Moss, R.A.S.C., of Croydon, who is the Air Freight reception clerk, on landing from U.K. with compo rations, Sep 20, 1944.

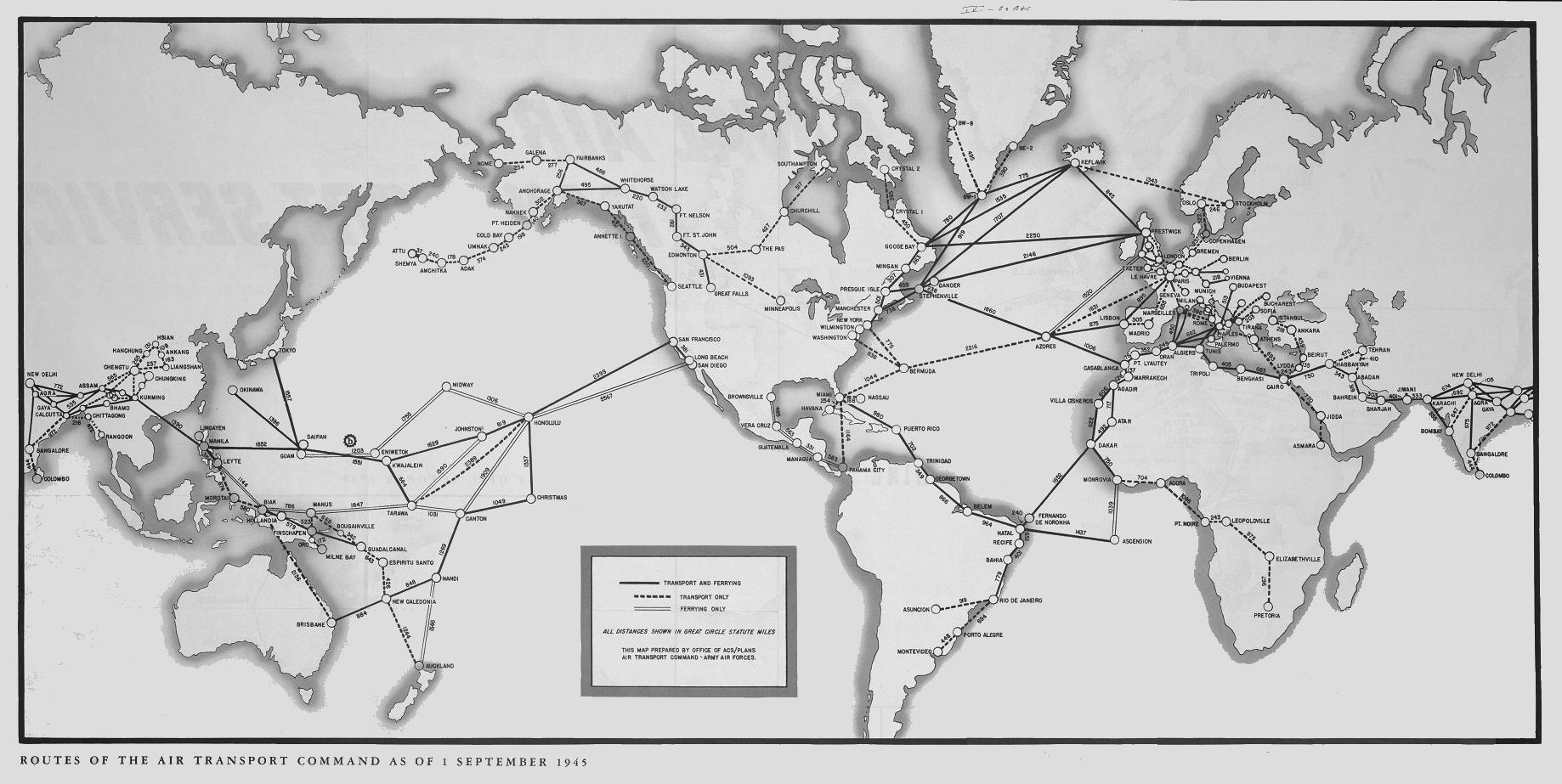
Map of worldwide routes of Air Transport Command, September 1945

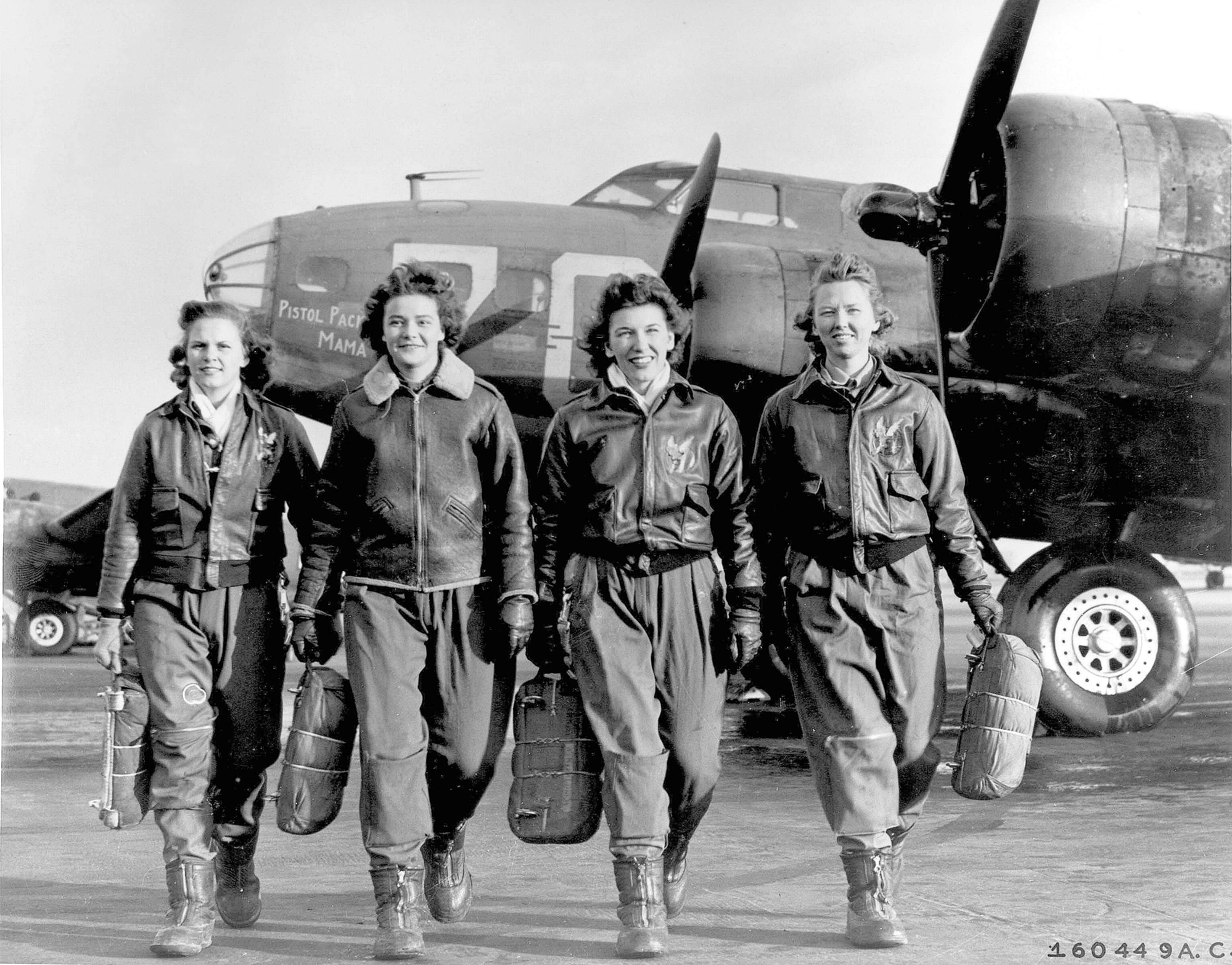
Members of the Women Airforce Service Pilots (WASP), who have been trained to ferry the B-17 Flying Fortresses, are pictured leaving their ship at the four engine school at Lockbourne Army Air Field during World War II, 1944

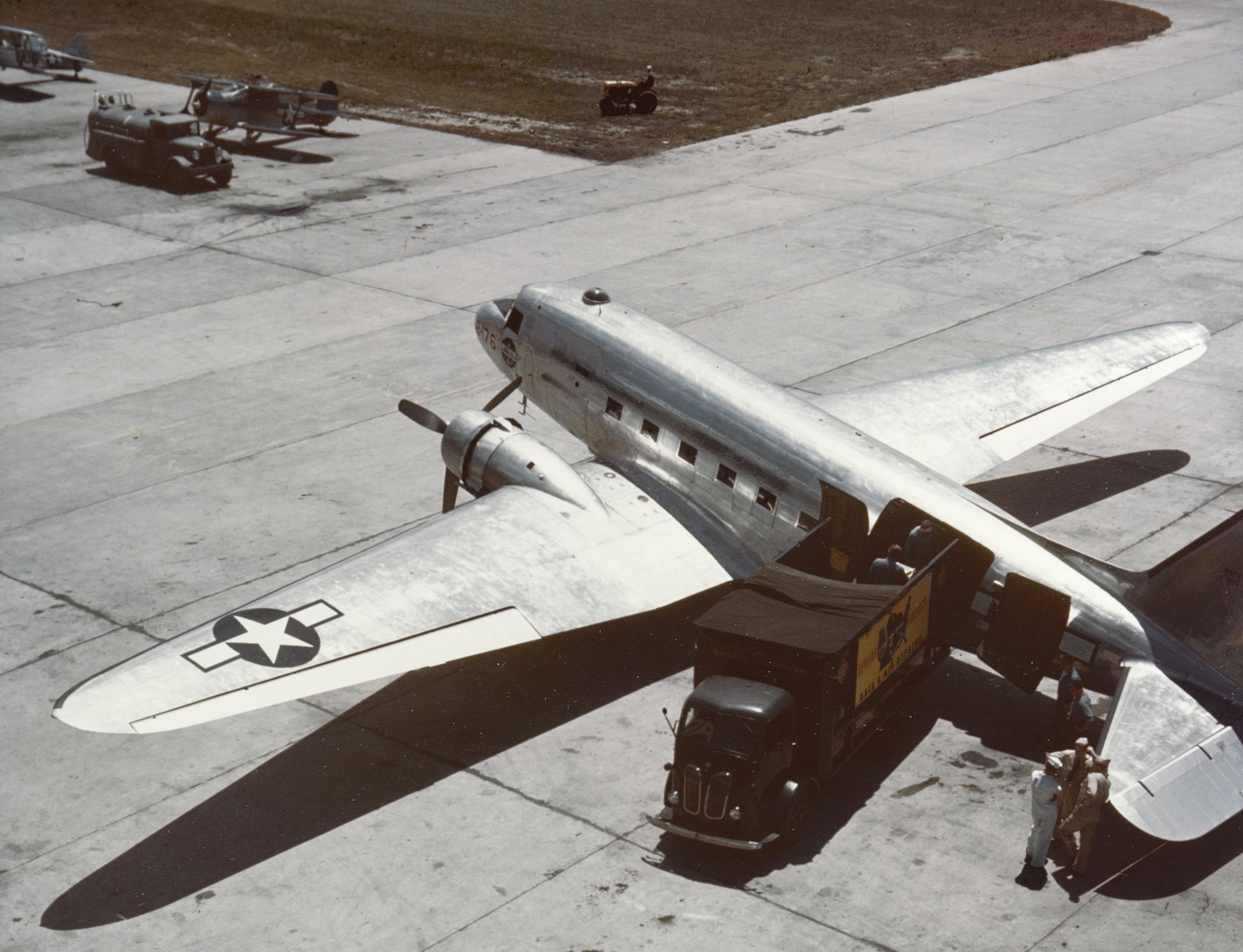
Douglas R4D-5 discharges high-priority freight into a "Railway Express Agency" International Harvester D300 truck, for immediate delivery to local Naval establishments in the United States, circa 1943-45

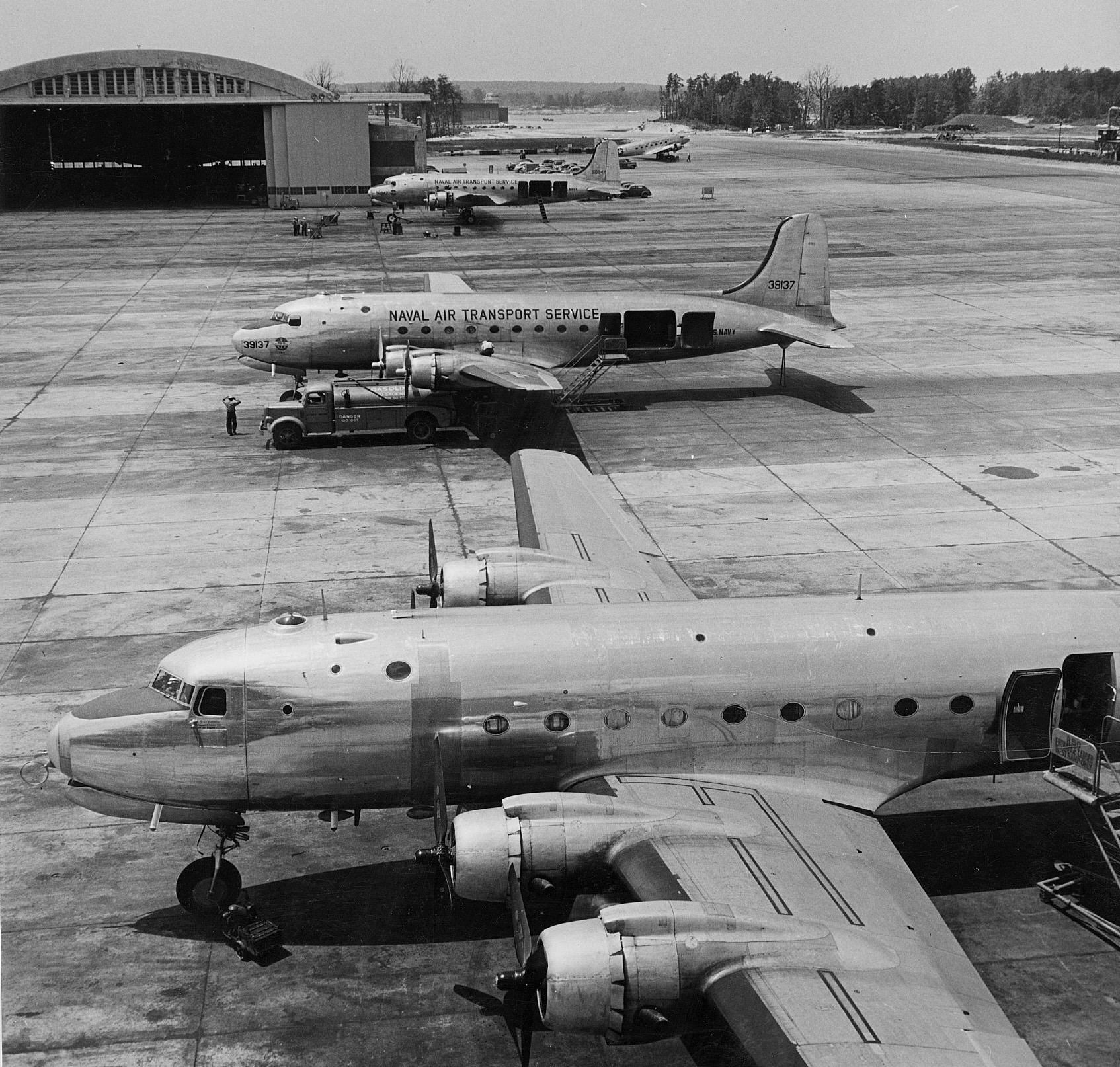
U.S. Navy Douglas R5D-1 Skymasters being loaded, two of which carry the markings of the Naval Air Transport Service (NATS), pictured on the flight line at an unidentified air station, c1945

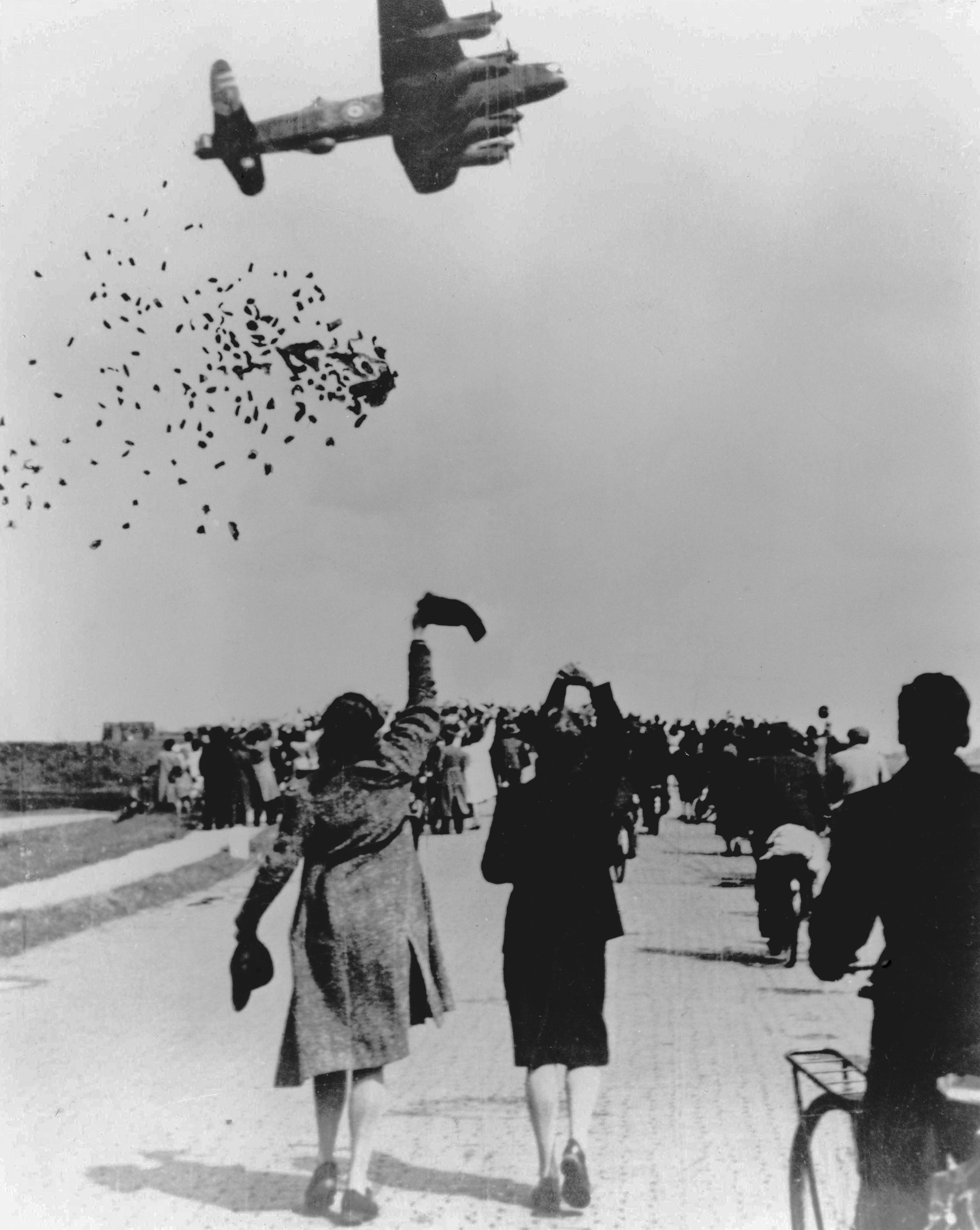
A Lancaster aircraft pulls up again after a food dropping over Ypenburg, the Netherlands, 1945.

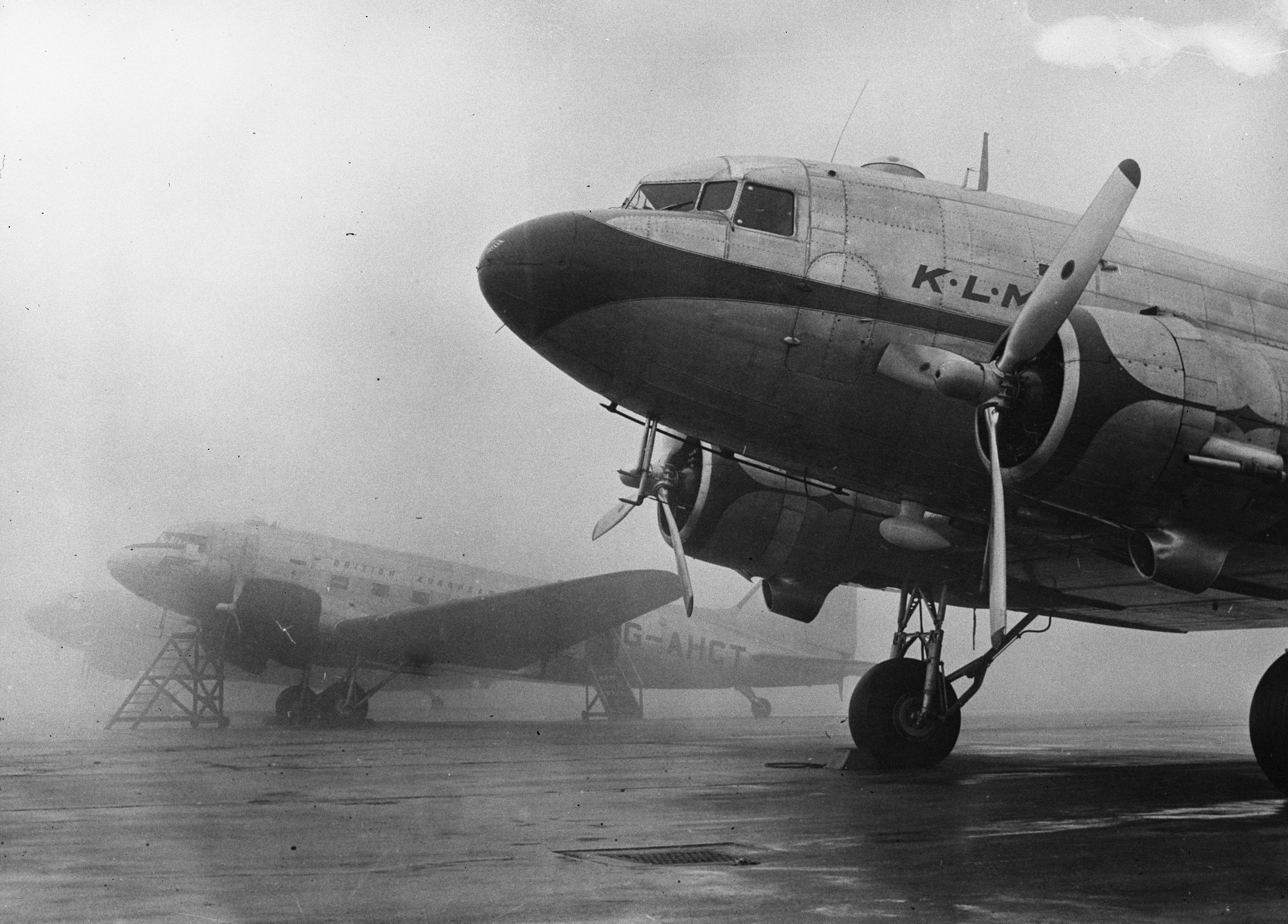
KLM Douglas DC-3 at Schiphol, Behind it is British European Airways Douglas DC-3 (G-AHCT), December 28, 1946.

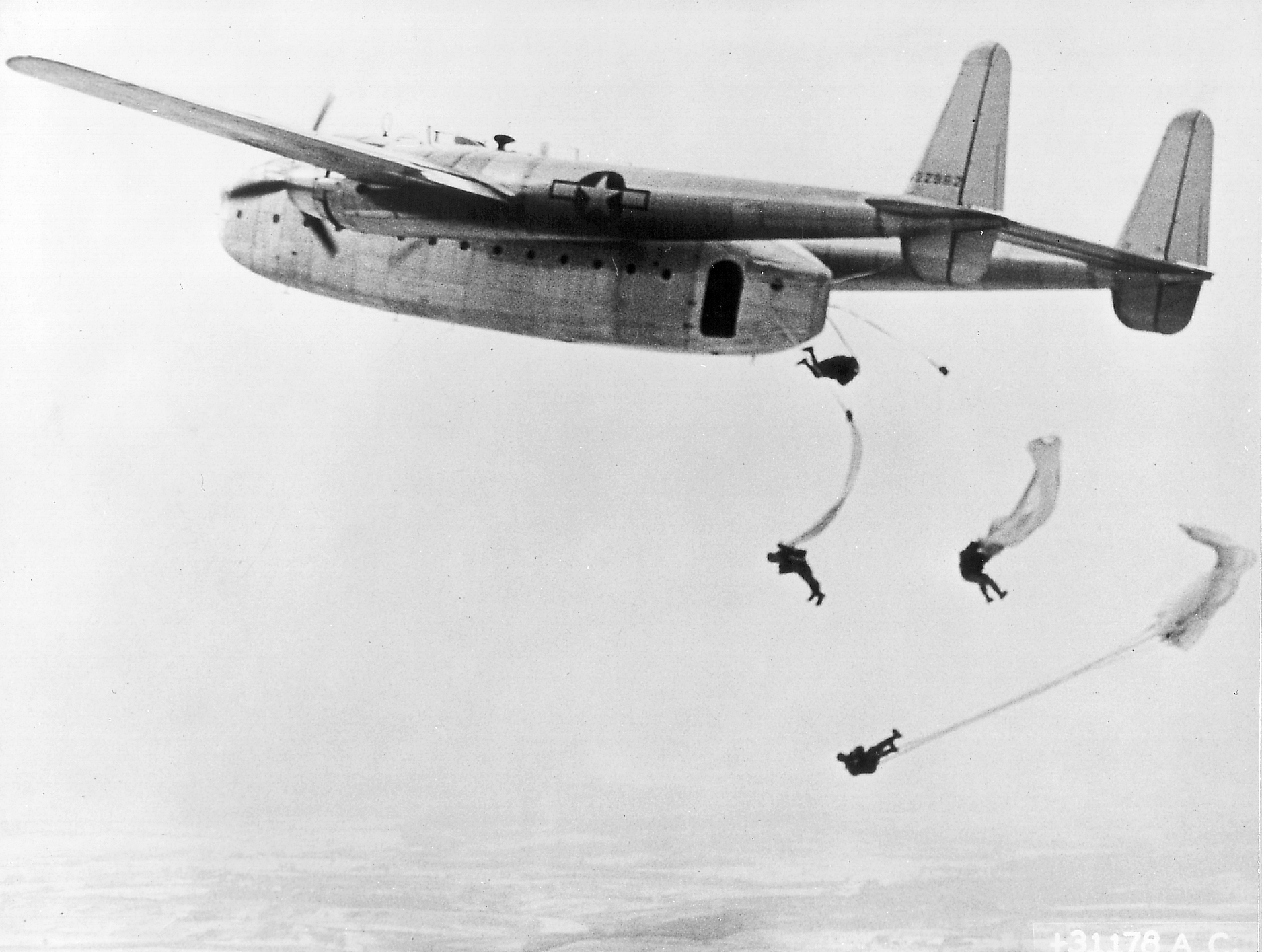
Paratroopers jumping from a Fairchild C-82 "Packet". It was primarily used for cargo and troop transport, but it also was used for paratroop operations and towing gliders. Its capacity was 41 paratroops or 34 stretchers and it had clam-shell rear doors that allowed easy entry of trucks, tanks, artillery, and other bulky cargo. 1940s.

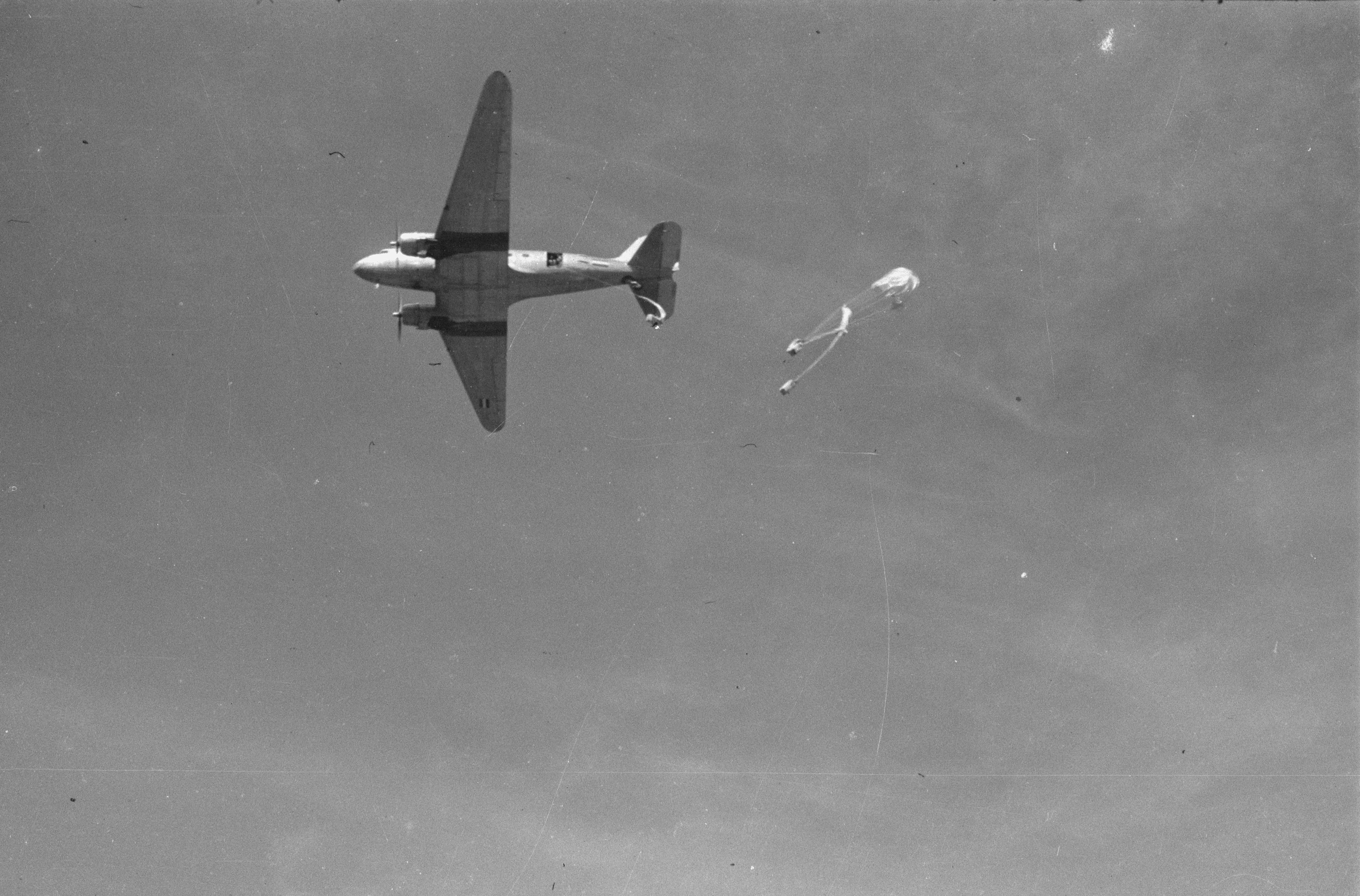
A cargo plane drops supplies over the Dutch East Indies, 1948.

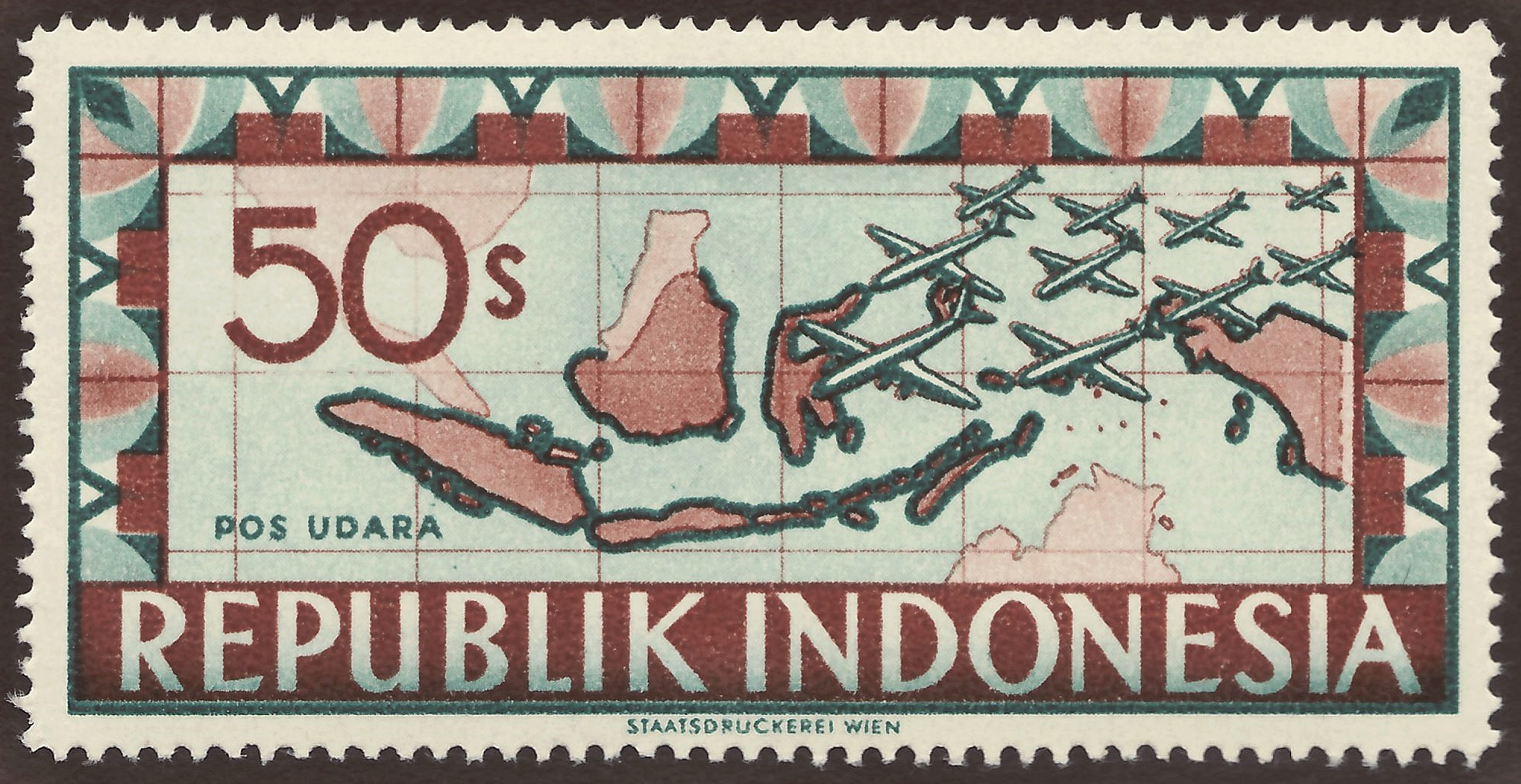
Stamp of Indonesia (Republic); 1949; regional airmail stamp of the "Vienna issue" as commemorative stamp to the ending of the Dutch naval blockade; stamp in new design with airplanes over a map of Indonesia representing an air bridge as blockade runner streaming towards the then "Republic of Indonesia" during her war for independence 1945-1949.

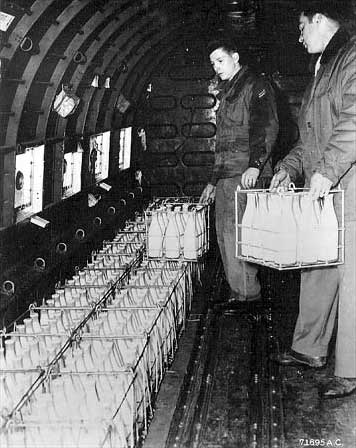
Berlin Blockade milk transport, 1948-1949

== See also ==
- Timeline of Air Cargo
- 1910s in air cargo
- 1920s in air cargo
- 1930s in air cargo
- 1950s in air cargo
- 1960s in air cargo
