= 1950s in air cargo =

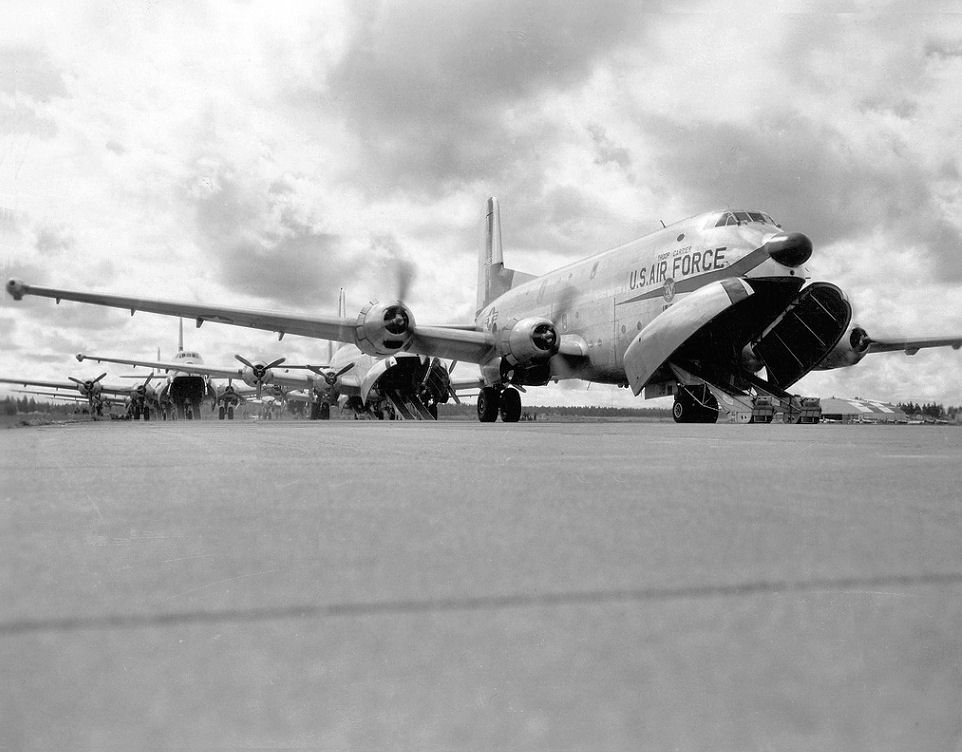
USAF C-124 Globemaster IIs loading cargo, 1950s.

This is a list of air cargo, airmail and airlift related events as well as a summary from the decade 1950–1959.

== Overview ==
=== Civil developments ===
In this decade, air freight was transitioning from a service ancillary to passenger transport toward becoming a recognized revenue and operations stream. As reported in 1956, following a trend from 1945 onward, air cargo volumes and revenues continued to rise sharply for major carriers worldwide: according to preliminary data published by the International Civil Aviation Organization, world air freight transport—excluding the Soviet Union and Communist China—exceeded one billion freight ton-miles per year for the first time in aviation annals.

In the same 1956 publication, in Europe British European Airways reported rising freight revenues and frequency (e.g., 80 weekly cargo services with daily average tonnages around 120,000 lb), and other European carriers such as Air France, KLM, Sabena and SAS also documented double-digit growth in airfreight and mail throughput year-on-year.

Also in the United States, following the same 1956 publication, growth was double digit. Another source reports U.S. scheduled airlines handled over 1,200,000 freight shipments in that same year. But a tough competition had taken place in the post-war years. Reflecting the commercial challenges faced by early air cargo carriers in the early post-war period, of the original four airlines all-freight airlines receiving operating permission by the CAB in 1949, Airnews and U. S. Airlines did not operate a long time. Airnews went bankrupt in June 1951 after sustaining significant financial losses, followed by U. S. Airlines in 1952, after continuing operating deficits and several accidents. By this decade, in the U.S. there is now a clear separation between three types of air cargo (in order of general profitability):

- airmail
- air express
- air freight

A commodity based air freight tariff has appeared for efficiency reasons, with related freight handling tariffs with bulk discounts based on break points. By 1957, some of the major U.S. airports are reported to have refrigerated storage rooms, special animal shelters and their own customs clearance stations.

=== Military developments ===
Especially for the United States, during the Korean War, military air cargo and airlift operations expanded dramatically to support United Nations forces. Strategic airlift delivered personnel, equipment, and supplies from the United States to Japan and Korea. The U.S. Air Force’s Military Air Transport Service (MATS) moved 214,000 passengers and 80,000 tons of cargo to the theater. Civil Reserve Air Fleet partnerships during the Korean War saw commercial carriers like Flying Tiger Line place fleets under MATS contract to meet military logistic demands, indicating integration between military and civil air cargo resources.

Within the Korean War combat zone, Combat Cargo Command executed intra-theater operations including supply delivery, airdrops, troop transport, and medical evacuation. It flew over 210,000 sorties, moved nearly 392,000 tons of cargo, and transported more than 2.6 million passengers, illustrating the strategic and tactical value of air logistics in active combat. In March 1951, Operation Tomahawk saw air mobility deployment by C-119 and C-46 transport aircraft, exemplifying tactical air transport’s ability to insert troops behind enemy lines during the Korean War. Also helicopters were introduced in combat situations, with air assault missions and the first “helicopter airlift and sling load combat mission” on 13 September 1951 by the U.S. Marine Corps.

In late 1956 into 1957, the United States executed Operation Safe Haven (also called Operation Mercy) after the Soviet suppression of the Hungarian Revolution. U.S. military and naval air transports evacuated and resettled over 27,000 Hungarian refugees to the United States in a major humanitarian airlift effort — the most significant European airlift since Berlin.

== Events ==
=== 1950s ===
- 1950-1953 – (United States) Delta Air Lines volunteered to ship blood donated through the American Red Cross to United Nations forces during the Korean War.
- Undated – (United States) American Airlines designed and used the world's first pet carrier container for air travel. The pet carrier container became a standard for airlines carrying pets all over the world.

=== 1950 ===
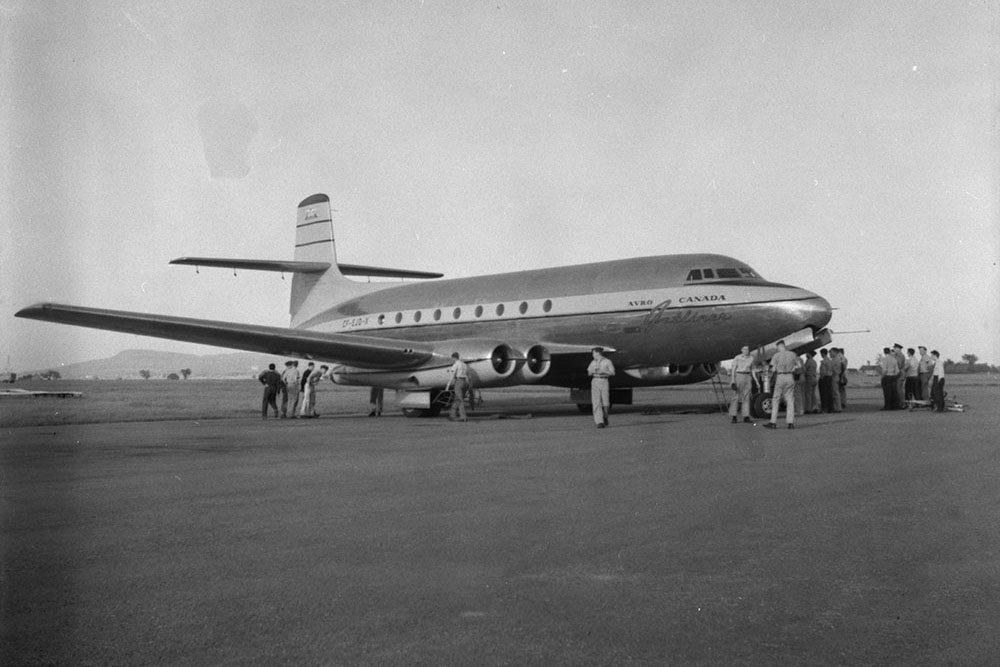
Avro Canada C-102 Jetliner, 1950

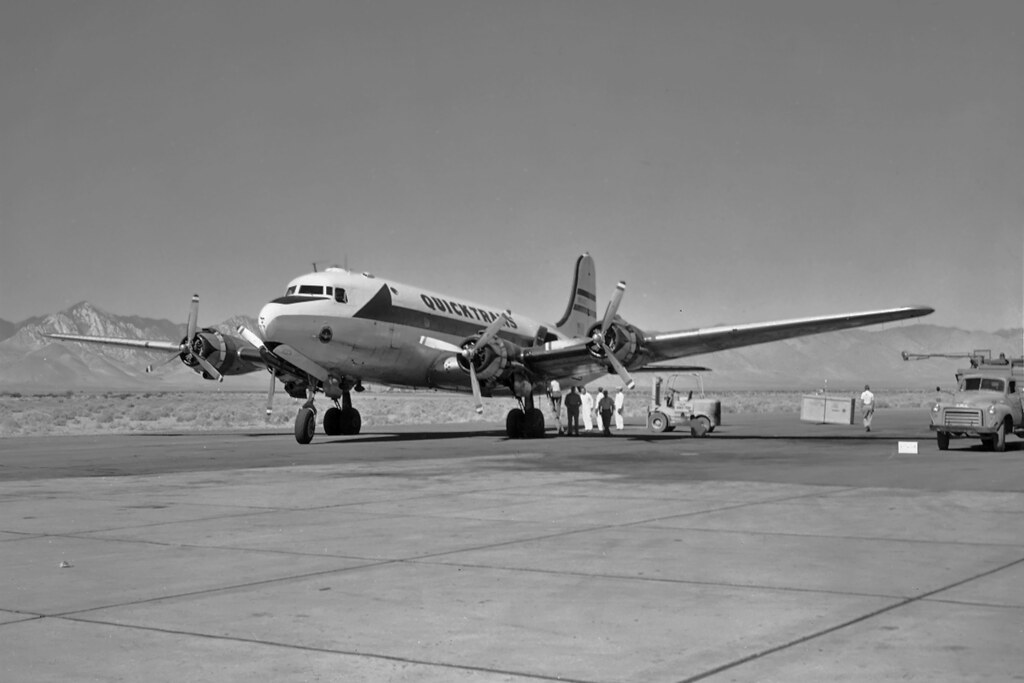
Quicktrans Navy contracted United States Overseas Airlines DC-4 NAF China Lake, October 4, 1959.

- April 18 – (Canada-United States) An Avro Canada C102 Jetliner carried the world's first jet airmail 365 miles (587 km) from Malton Airport in Toronto, to New York City's Idlewild Airport in fifty-nine minutes and fifty-six seconds–half that of commercial flights. The flight was highly publicized and the crew was greeted by a group of officials and a crowd of several hundred onlookers. So new was the concept of jet power that the Jetliner was made to park far from the terminal, and pans were placed under the engines in case they dripped any "self-igniting fuel". On the next day, the Jetliner returned to Toronto via Montreal.
- June 25 – (United States-Korea) Flying Tiger Line, on request of the Military Air Transport Service (MATS), makes seven aircraft available in response to logistic demands of the Korean War. During the early 1950s, Flying Tiger Line would place its full fleet under the Civil Reserve Air Fleet program and operated under the Military Air Transport Service's Pacific Division. Between 1951 and 1953, these missions represented a substantial share of the carrier's business, generating close to half of its total revenue over that period.
- June 29 – (United States-French Indochina) see 1950 in aviation also: Eight C-47 Skytrain cargo aircraft cross the Pacific Ocean from the United States to French Indochina to deliver the first American military aid to French forces fighting against the Vietminh in the First Indochina War.
- July 5 – (United States-Korea) Quicktrans startup – In response to logistic demands of the Korean War, the U.S. Navy and Slick Airways launched operation Quicktrans to quickly move 96,000 lbs (about 44 tonnes) of ammunition across the United States. The operation established daily transcontinental cargo flights with Curtiss C-46s, reducing delivery times dramatically versus ground transport and formalizing one of the first major military-contract air freight programs.

=== 1951 ===
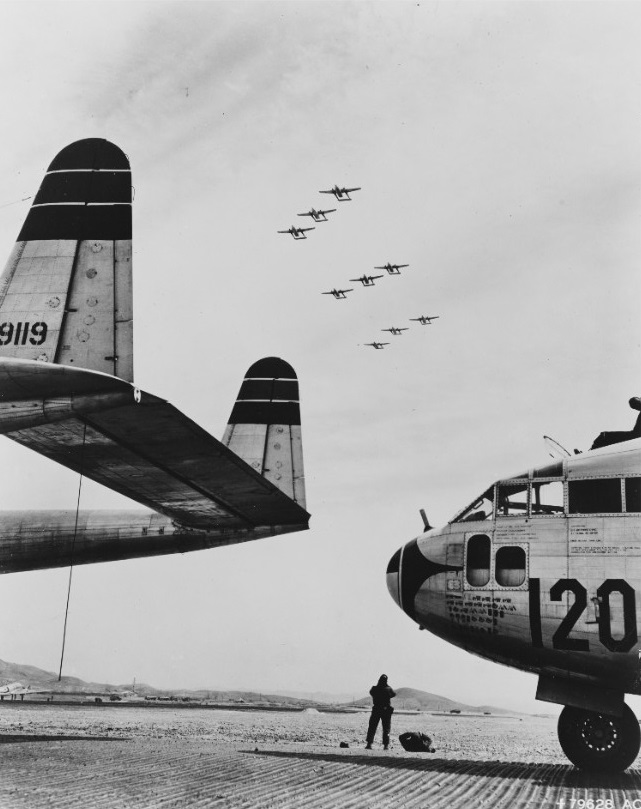
Operation Tomahawk U.S. Air Force Fairchild C-119 transport aircraft

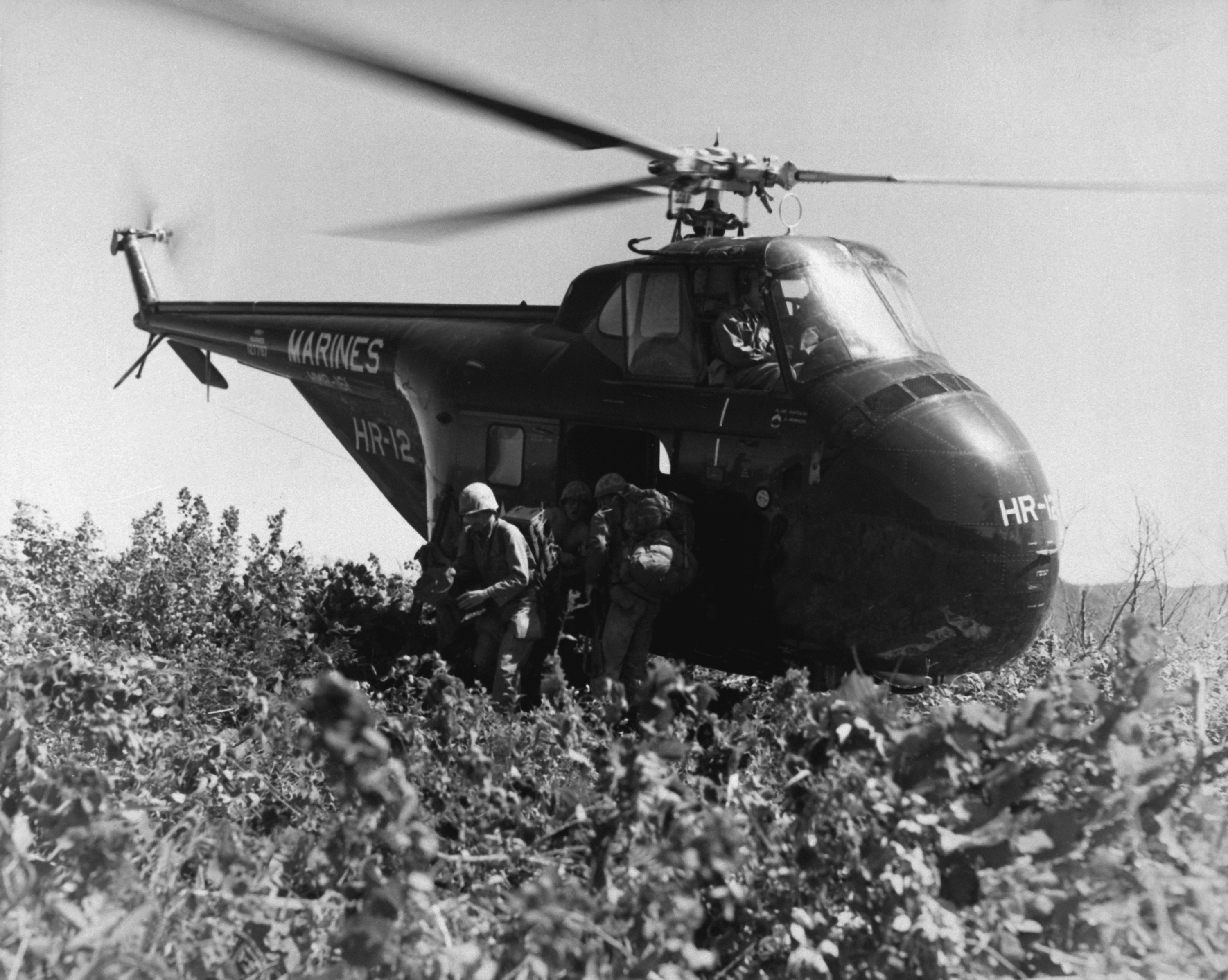
U.S. Marines of the First Marine Division Reconnaissance Company debark from a Sikorsky HRS-1 helicopter of Marine helicopter transport squadron HMR-161 on Hill 812, to relieve the Republic of Korea 8th Division, during the Korean War, on 20 September 1951.

- Undated – (Japan) Nippon Express starts domestic air cargo consolidation business.
- Undated – (Korea) Operation Tomahawk was an airborne military operation by the 187th Regimental Combat Team (187th RCT) on 23 March 1951 at Munsan-ni as part of Operation Courageous in the Korean War. This operation was designed to drop the 187th RCT about 30 kilometres (19 mi) north of the then current front line, and then link up with Task Force Growdon, which was made up of armored elements from the US 24th Infantry Division (United States)'s 6th Medium Tank Battalion and infantry elements from the US 3rd Infantry Division. They did so, parachuting from over a 120 C-119 Flying Boxcar and C-46 transport aircraft.
- Undated – (United Kingdom - Iran) British Overseas Airways Corporation performs an airlift of British citizens out of Iran as part of the Abadan Crisis.
- May – (Bermuda) During the IATA Composite Traffic Conferences, the gathered airlines adopt the world's first Multilateral Interline Cargo Handling Agreement, establishing standardized procedures for transferring air cargo across interline (multi-airline) networks, becoming effective October 1, 1951. This was a foundational development in global air cargo logistics, allowing cargo originating on one airline to be transported seamlessly over multiple carriers under unified handling rules and documentation.
- August 15 – (United Kingdom) British European Airways commences the world's first turboprop freight services using a modified Douglas DC-3 fitted with two Rolls-Royce Dart engines.
- September 13 – (United States / Korea) The world's first helicopter airlift and helicopter sling load combat mission was conducted on September 13, 1951, during the Korean War. Operation Windmill I was conducted by the United States Marine Corps in support of a battalion clearing the enemy from a series of ridges around a basin called The Punchbowl. In total seven HRS-1 Marine helicopters made 28 flights that delivered 8,550 kg (18,848 pounds) of supplies and evacuated 74 seriously wounded men.

=== 1952 ===
- Undated – (United States) In the U.S. airline subsidies were separated from the airmail contracts. The Civil Aeronautics Board (CAB) began handling broader subsidy payments beyond airmail, signifying a shift in the commercial airline business model where passenger and freight considerations increasingly dictated network structures.
- January 5 – (United States) Pan Am Cargo started using a DC-6 on the subsidiary's first transatlantic all-cargo service.

=== 1953 ===
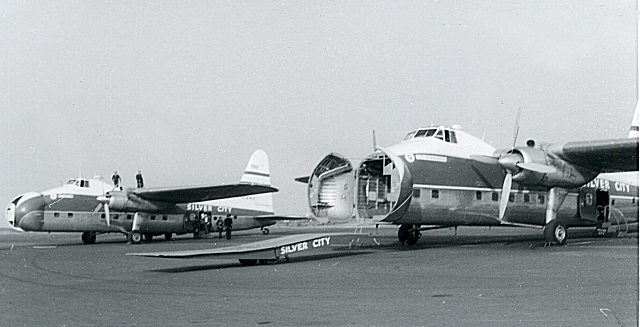
Silver City Airways Bristol Superfreighters at Lydd Airport, August 1960

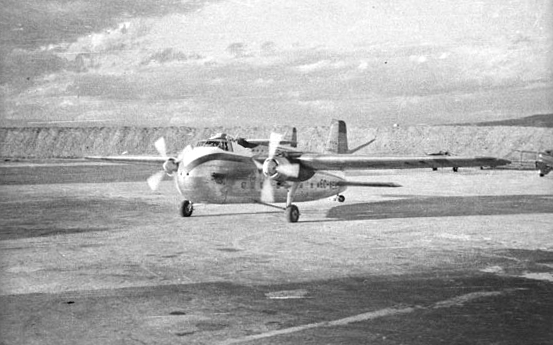
Aviaco Bristol 170 MK11-A freighter EC-AES, Madrid-Barajas, 1953.

- Undated – (United Kingdom) Silver City Airways took delivery of its first Bristol Superfreighter.
- Undated – (United States) Delta Air Lines' international air cargo service launched, with flights to the Caribbean and Venezuela.
- Undated – (United States) Although similar duties began in World War II, in 1953 the loadmaster title became official within the U.S. Air Force. Loadmaster duties were split by crew chiefs, engineers, flight traffic clerks, and "kickers" who kicked cargo out of planes for airdrops.
- Undated – (United States) UPS starts Blue Label Air, a 2-day delivery service on coast-to-coast packages. As before in 1929, UPS package volume was transported on commercial airline flights. Initially unprofitable, Blue Label Air became popular as its speed created enough demand to maintain a profit.
- November 15 – (United States) see 1953 in aviation also: The first airmail service into Death Valley National Monument begins, landing at Furnace Creek Airport (L06). This was part of airmail route AM-105.

=== 1954 ===
- Undated – (United States) American Airlines introduced the world's first air cargo industry unit load device (ULD), a container called the Paul Bunyan Box. The box featured the legendary woodsman on the side of the box.
- Undated – (United States-Haiti) Delta Air Lines provided disaster relief efforts for the Haitian community after Hurricane Hazel.
- April 23 – (Lebanon) Beirut International Airport is inaugurated, establishing a modern Middle Eastern air hub. Airmail stamps were issued highlighting the facility.

=== 1955 ===
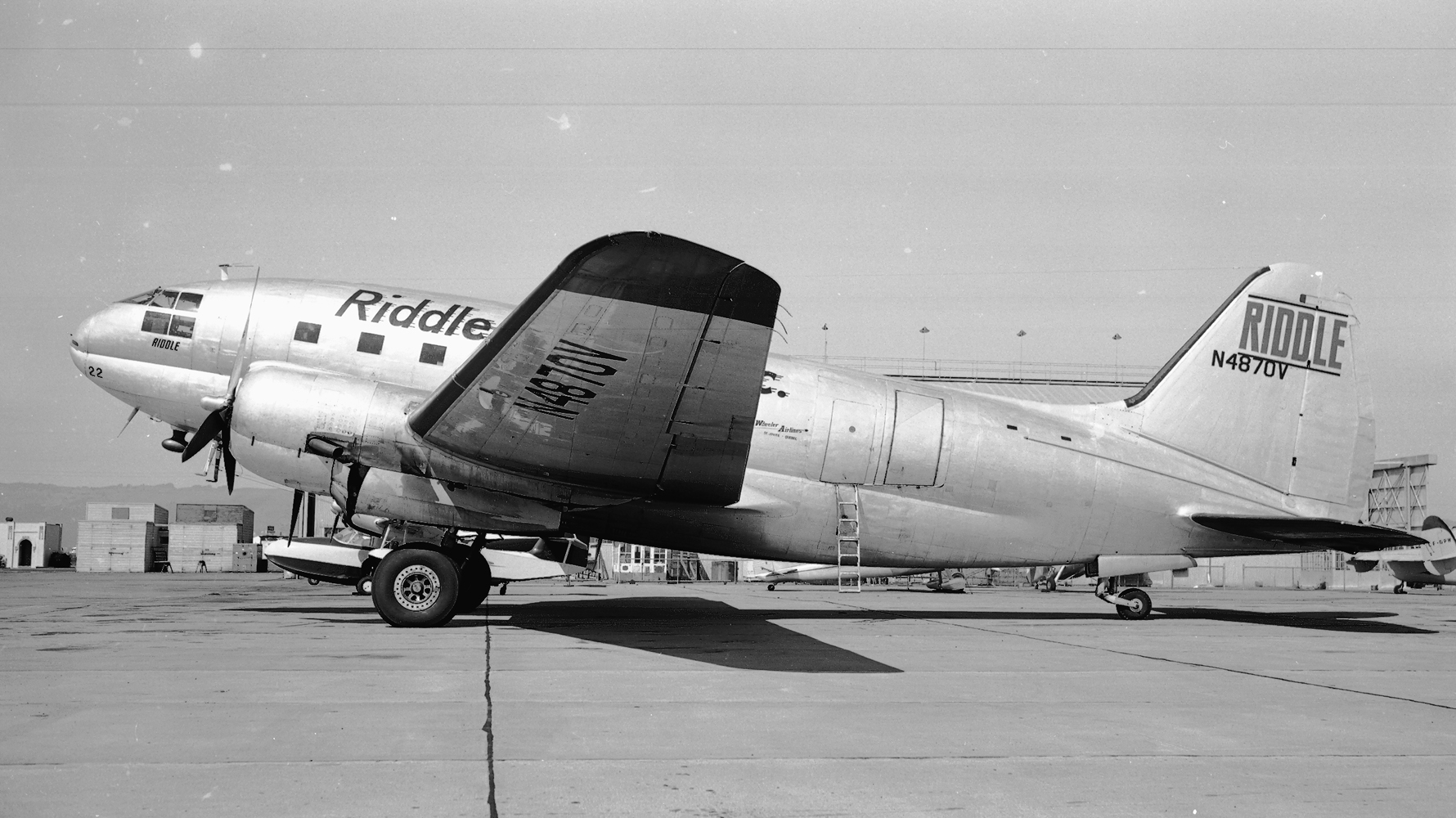
Riddle Curtiss C-46 N4870V at Oakland, California, in August 1955.

- Undated – (United States) The U.S. Civil Aeronautics Board (CAB) conducted an Air Freight Forwarder Investigation. CAB examiner Paul Pfeiffer recommended that air freight forwarders — companies responsible for consolidating and tendering freight to airlines — be allowed to continue operations indefinitely, despite generally poor financial performance among forwarders at the time. This investigation helped shape early regulatory frameworks for air cargo intermediaries within U.S. civil aviation.
- April – (United States) Following the federal licensing of the Salk polio vaccine, Emery Air Freight coordinated an accelerated nationwide air distribution effort, delivering the first consignments to nineteen cities across the United States within approximately fourteen hours of approval.
- May 2 – (United States) The Civil Aeronautics Board authorized the Flying Tiger Line, together with the all-cargo carriers Slick Airways and Riddle Airlines, to take part in a U.S. Post Office experimental program for the carriage of airmail on a space-available basis.

=== 1956 ===
- Undated – (United Kingdom) British European Airways (BEA) began using Vickers Viscounts for nightfreight operations to increase cargo capacity as well as the aircraft's utilisation.
- Undated – (United States) New York International Airport (then known as Idlewild Airport) officially opened its International Air Cargo Center, which was widely regarded at the time as the world’s largest and most advanced purpose-built air freight facility.
- April 1 – (United States) Seaboard & Western Airlines (later Seaboard World Airlines) restarted scheduled freighter services across the North Atlantic.
- December 10 – (United States) The airlift Operation Safe Haven, also known as Operation Mercy, was ordered by President Dwight D. Eisenhower. It was a refugee relief and resettlement operation executed by the United States following the Soviet suppression of the Hungarian Revolution of 1956. The airlift started on January 1st, 1957, and was a joint endeavor by the United States' Military Air Transport Services, the United States Navy, and various commercial airlines, a.o. Flying Tiger Line. Beyond the US, various nations and their airlines, like for example BOAC, participated, with 180,000 refugees being resettled from Austria and Yugoslavia to 37 countries. Canada and the US took in roughly 40,000 each, while significant numbers went to Britain and Germany.

=== 1957 ===
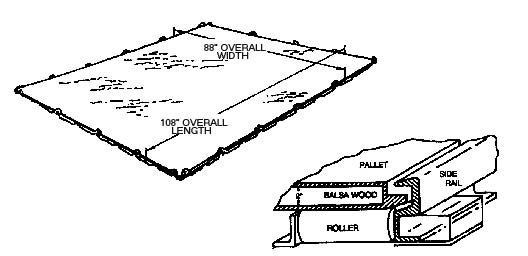
USAF 463L Master Pallet From US Army FM55-450, "ARMY HELICOPTER INTERNAL LOAD OPERATIONS".

- Undated – (Japan) Nippon Express starts international air cargo consolidation business.
- Undated – (United States) The SS-463L program originated in 1957, when a committee of the United States Air Force initiated the development of a standardized air cargo handling system. In 1959, responsibility for system development was awarded to the Douglas Aircraft Company. The resulting SS-463L Pallet Cargo Handling System defined technical requirements for aircraft compatibility, including the specification of a standardized master pallet as a key element of the overall material handling concept. Production of the master pallet was contracted to Cadillac Manufacturing Corporation, later known as AAR Cadillac Manufacturing Corporation and subsequently AAR Corp. This development would revolutionize air freight handling in the next decade when the wide body jets made their entry.
- February 1 – (United Kingdom) The Bristol Britannia Model 102 began scheduled service on 1 February 1957 with a BOAC flight from London to Johannesburg.
- June – (Lebanon) see 1957 in aviation also: Middle East Airlines leases an Avro York cargo aircraft.
- September 7 – (United States) S. 2815, a bill to amend the Aircraft Loan Guarantees Act is enacted. The statute authorized the federal government to guarantee private loans made to eligible air (cargo) carriers for the purchase of aircraft, primarily to help smaller and local airlines obtain financing on more favorable terms than they could secure independently. The program was under the administrative responsibility of the Civil Aeronautics Board (CAB) and set to expire on 7 September 1962.

=== 1958 ===
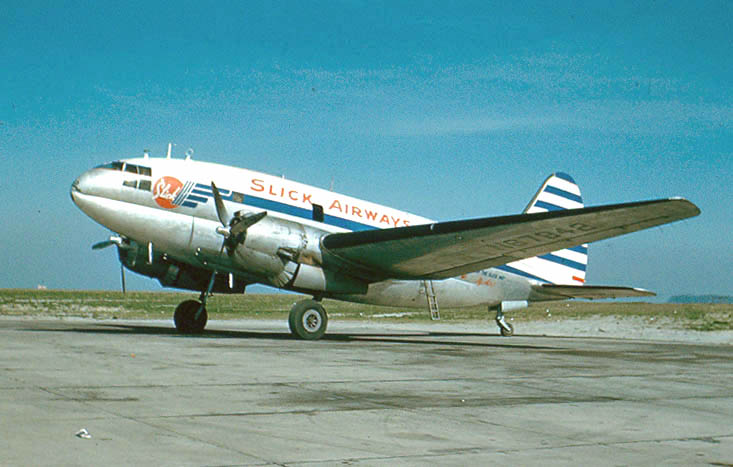
Slick Airways C-46 at SFO (Bill Larkins, undated)

- Undated – (United States) Delta Air Lines' first airfreight passenger was Frank Taylor, flying with a shipment of roses from Philadelphia to Atlanta.
- Undated – (United States) Slick Airways, one of the first fully certificated U.S. all-cargo airlines, suspended its scheduled services due to regulatory and profitability challenges; afterward it primarily flew military charters.
- June 26 – (United States) see 1958 in aviation also: A Grumman TF-1 Trader of U.S. Navy Air Transport Squadron 21 carried a Westinghouse J34 jet engine from San Diego, California, on a 300-mile (483-km) flight to the antisubmarine warfare carrier USS Yorktown (CVS-10), then at sea in the Pacific Ocean. It was the first delivery of an aircraft engine via carrier onboard delivery.
- October 26 – (United States) The Boeing 707 entered commercial passenger service with Pan Am, first flight being from New York City to Paris. Other carriers would follow soon. It was designed as a passenger commercial transport and cargo/mail was carried loose in the belly holds of regular passenger 707 services as was standard practice for piston and early jetliners.

=== 1959 ===
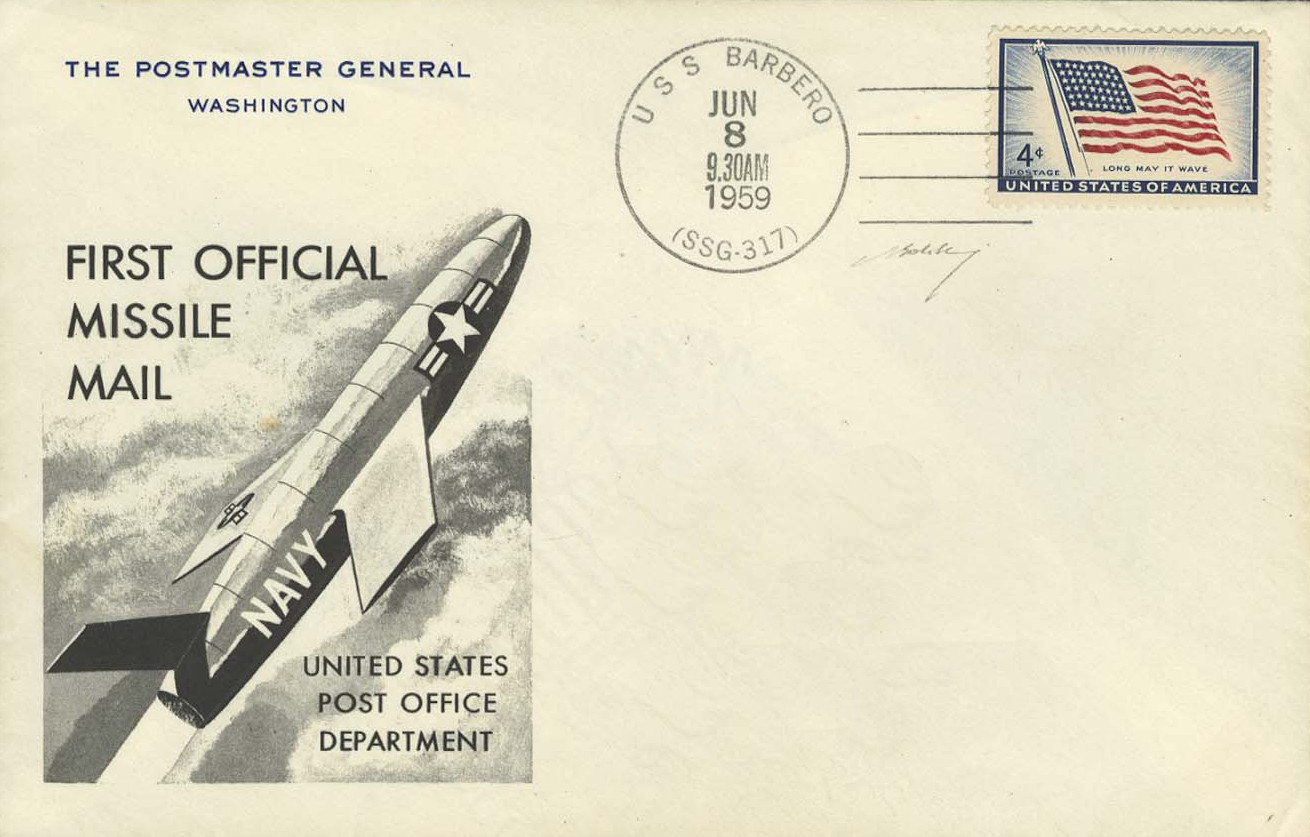
Missile mail

- Undated – (United States) Delta Air Lines transported "King", the first dog to fly on a commercial jet, from Houston to New York City.
- May 2 – (Japan-United States) Japan Airlines (JAL) inaugurates the first scheduled freighter flight on the route between Tokyo and San Francisco, using a chartered Douglas DC-4.
- June 8 – (United States) Rocket mail experiment: the United States Navy submarine USS Barbero assisted the Post Office Department, predecessor to the United States Postal Service (USPS), in its search for faster mail transportation, with the only delivery of "Missile Mail" by successfully firing a Regulus cruise missile – its nuclear warhead having earlier been replaced by two Post Office Department mail containers – targeted at the Naval Auxiliary Air Station at Naval Station Mayport in Florida.
- September 18 – (United States) The Douglas DC-8 entered service with Delta Air Lines and United Airlines. As with its competitor the Boeing 707, cargo/mail were carried only in the aircraft hold as belly cargo, loose, along with baggage, as common in passenger service.
- November 25 – (Japan-United States) Japan Airlines (JAL) replaces the chartered Douglas DC-4 freighter flight on the route between Tokyo and San Francisco, with a Douglas DC-6 semi-cargo aircraft.

== Airlines, companies and organizations founded ==
This decade, the following airlines or air cargo related companies or organizations were founded that were or would become important for air cargo and airmail history:

=== 1950 ===
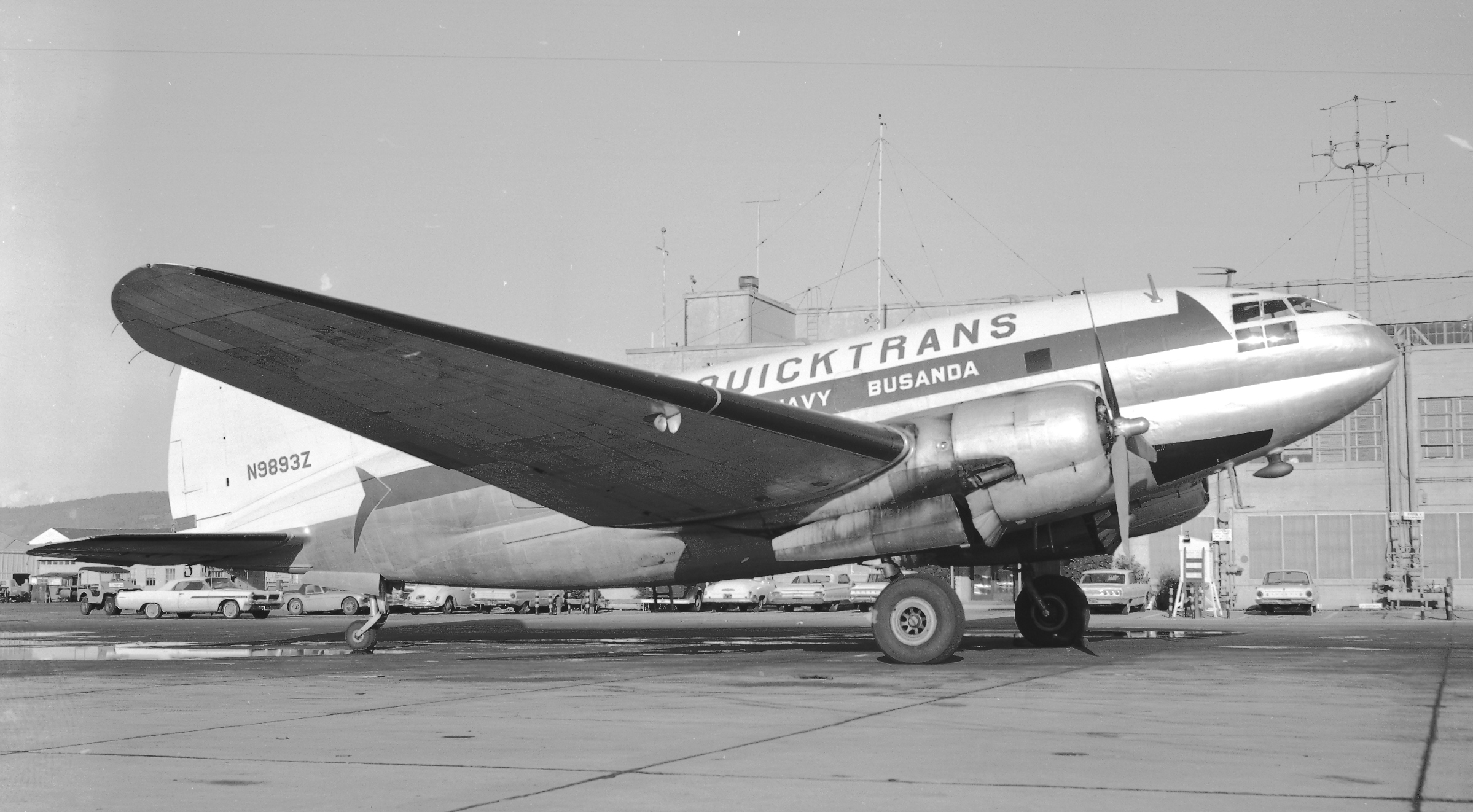
Operating on a "Quicktrans" contract for the U.S. Navy's Bureau of Supplies and Accounts (BuSandA), Capitol Airways C-46F N9893Z at Oakland in Jan 1965.

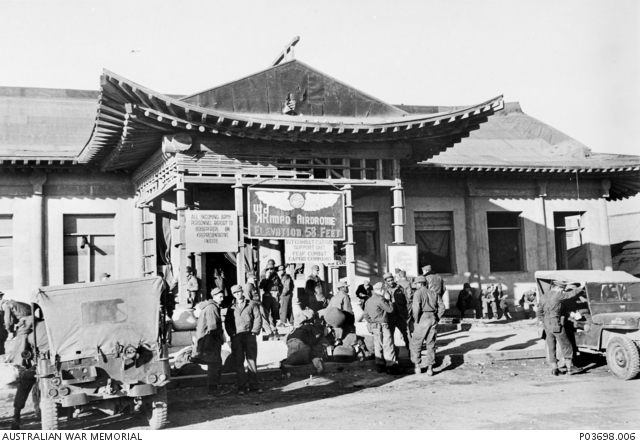
The Combat Cargo office at Kimpo Airfield. The signs mounted on the building read "Kimpo Airdrome, elevation 58 feet" "1st Combat Cargo Support Unit, FEAF Combat Cargo Command". Many unidentified American servicemen wait outside the building and there are two Jeeps parked to either side. November 6, 1950.

- July 5 – (United States) Quicktrans – a domestic United States Navy air freight virtual airline (1950–1994), initially overseen by the Navy's Bureau of Supplies and Accounts (aka BuSandA), linking major Navy facilities. Apart from providing the Navy with fast, low-cost transport, Quicktrans was an early experiment that showed efficient air cargo was possible, and an important source of freight business for early US air carriers. As from 1954, the Air Force operated the similar Logair, inspired in part by Quicktrans. Quicktrans was not, however, identical to the larger Logair. For instance, unlike Logair, Quicktrans usually relied on a single air vendor, eventually added trucks, becoming multimodal, and came to use the Lockheed L-100 Hercules as a sole aircraft type. Quicktrans outlasted Logair, but was also ultimately a victim of post-Cold War rationalization and the availability of commercial networks like Federal Express.
- August – (United States / Korea) Combat Cargo Command – a United States Air Force airlift organization established during the Korean War to coordinate and execute theater-level air transport operations. Prior to its formation, the U.S. Air Force's airlift capability in the Far East was dispersed and limited. In August 1950, experienced airlift commander Major General William H. Tunner, who had previously directed the Berlin Airlift, was assigned to the theater and charged with consolidating air transport efforts. Under his leadership, Combat Cargo Command assumed responsibility for all intra-theater airlift tasks, including the delivery and airdrop of supplies, movement of troops, paratrooper operations, psychological warfare missions, medical evacuation, and air rescue support. Combat Cargo Command played a critical role in sustaining United Nations forces throughout the conflict. After the amphibious landing at Inchon, the unit's airlift capability allowed the Eighth Army to advance more rapidly than its ground supply lines could support. During heavy fighting, particularly in the Chinese offensives of late 1950 and early 1951, aerial resupply operations were often decisive to the survival and effectiveness of retreating and forward-deployed units. At its peak, Combat Cargo Command flew hundreds of thousands of sorties, transported hundreds of thousands of tons of materiel, conducted some of the largest airdrops up to that time, and moved millions of personnel.

=== 1951 ===
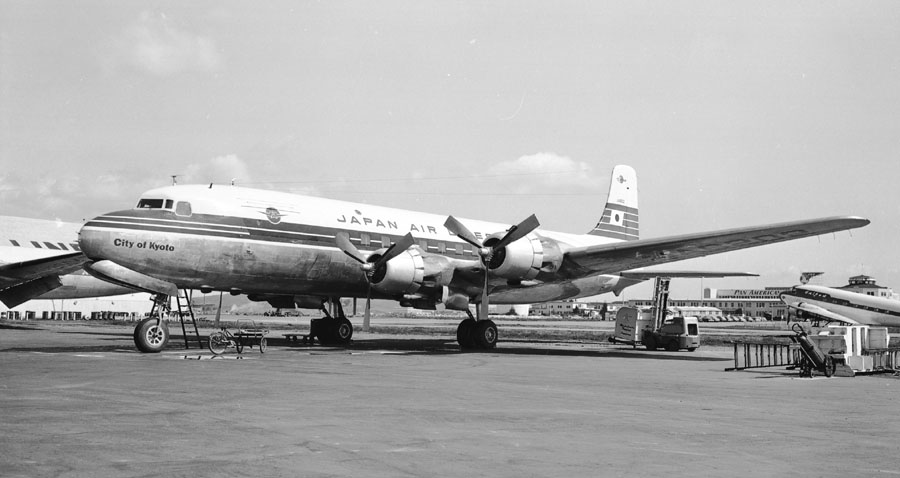
Japan Air Lines DC-6, San Francisco, 1954 (Bill Larkins)

- August 1 – (Japan) Japan Airlines Co. – established on 1 August 1951, with the government of Japan recognising the need for a reliable air transportation system to help Japan recover in the aftermath of World War II. The airline was founded with an initial capital of ¥100 million; its headquarters were located in Ginza, Chūō, Tokyo. Between 27 and 29 of August, the airline operated invitational flights on a Douglas DC-3 Kinsei, leased from Philippine Airlines. JAL established critical cargo links early, introducing its first international freighter service between Tokyo and San Francisco in 1959. It also formed early joint-operation pooling agreements for cargo freighters to Europe with carriers like Air France and Lufthansa in 1969. The airline was a leader in adopting mixed-type and exclusive cargo aircraft, such as the DC-8F and Boeing 707, to bridge transpacific and Eurasian trade routes. From 1983 to 1987, JAL was ranked number one globally in combined passenger and cargo transportation performance by IATA.

=== 1952 ===
U.S. Civil Reserve Air Fleet emblem

- Undated – (United States) Civil Reserve Air Fleet (CRAF) – part of the United States's mobility resources, where selected aircraft from U.S. airlines, contractually committed to Civil Reserve Air Fleet, support United States Department of Defense airlift requirements in emergencies when the need for airlift exceeds the capability of available military aircraft. After aircraft were commandeered for the Berlin Airlift, the Civil Reserve Air Fleet (CRAF) was created in 1952 as a more orderly way of serving emergency military needs. The Fleet has two main segments: international and national (domestic). The CRAF has been activated three times. The first activation was as part of Operation Desert Shield. The second was once as part of Operation Iraqi Freedom. In 2021 it was activated as part of Operation Allies Refuge in Afghanistan.

=== 1953 ===
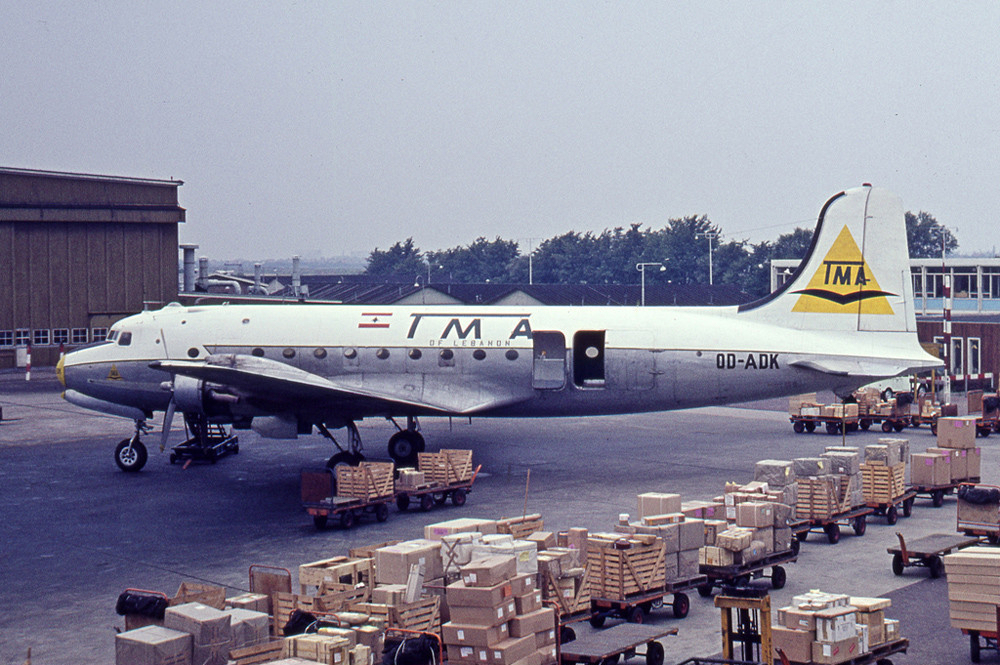
Trans Mediterranean Airways (TMA Cargo) Douglas DC-4-1009, OD-ADK, July 30, 1964.

- Undated - (Lebanon) Trans Mediterranean Airways (TMA Cargo) – founded in Beirut, TMA was one of the earliest dedicated all-cargo airlines in the Middle East, launching ad-hoc and scheduled freight services from Beirut. It became the first all-cargo scheduled carrier certified in Western Asia by 1959, and helped to open freight markets between Europe, the Middle East, and beyond. TMA pioneered round-the-world scheduled services in both directions for a freight-only operator in the region.

=== 1954 ===
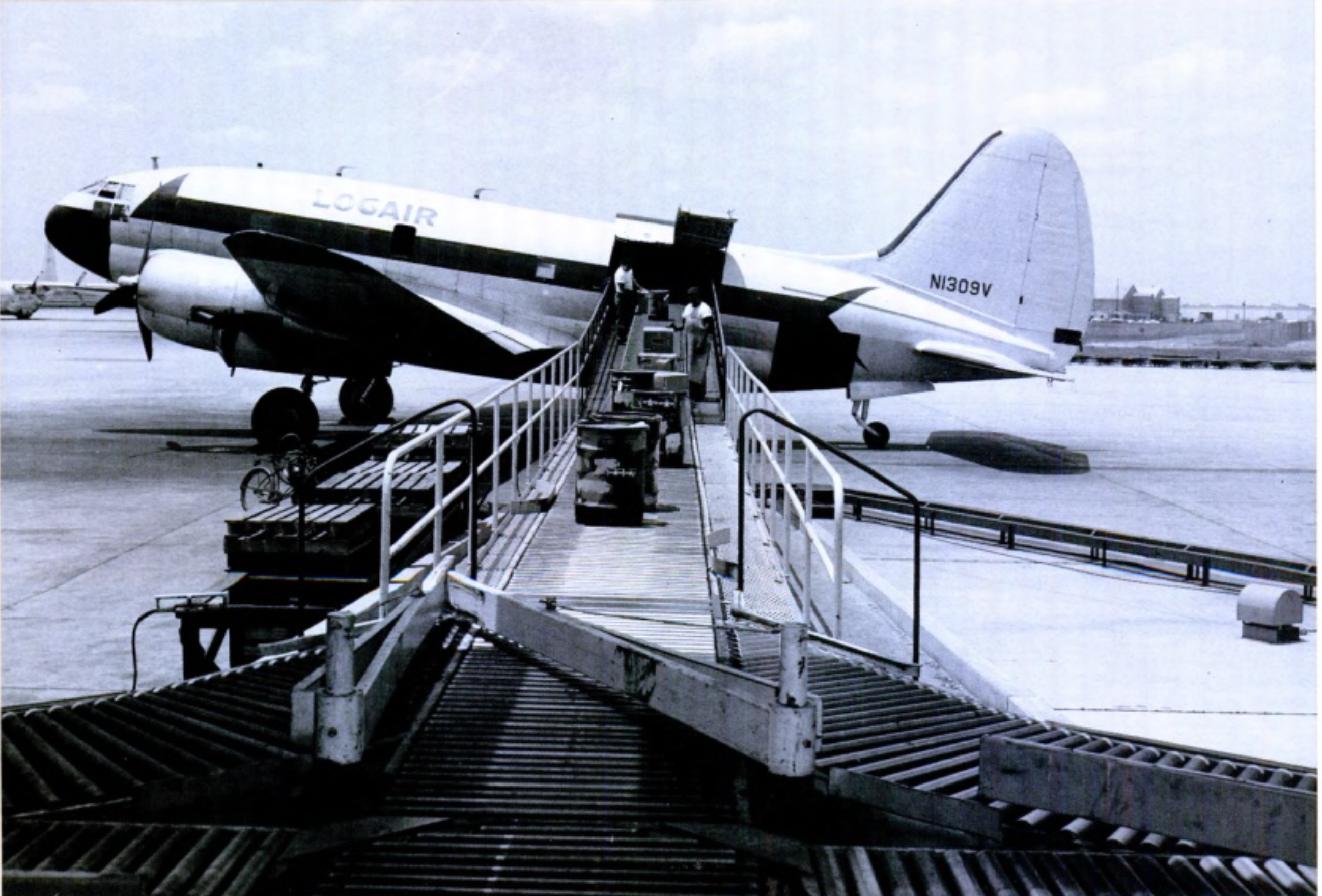
Capitol Airways Curtiss C-46 Commando at Kelly Air Force Base in Air Force Logair service sometime in the late 1950s or early 1960s.

- January – (United States) Flying Tiger Line and Slick Airways attempt to merge, but although the Civil Aeronautics Board (CAB) approved the merger in January, the Flying Tigers-Slick Airlines entity is dissolved nine months later over a labor cost issue.
- April – (United States) Logair, short for Logistic Airlift – a domestic United States Air Force virtual airline (1954–1992) that contracted carriers to fly cargo between Air Force bases, initially under the aegis of the Air Materiel Command (AMC) (not to be confused with Air Mobility Command). The program was first called Mercury Service but American Airlines then used the same name for coast-to-coast flights, so this quickly changed. Logair was a key source of demand for early US airfreight carriers, some of which became Logair specialists. Over time, its relative importance to the airline industry faded. The program was a victim of post-Cold War spending cuts and availability of robust commercial networks such as FedEx.

=== 1955 ===
- Undated – (Japan) Kokusai Ryoko Kosha, later 1959 Yusen Air Service Co., Ltd. and from 2010 after merge with NYK Logistics Japan known as Yusen Logistics – established as an handling company for the general travel and air cargo industry, acting as an air transport agent certified by the International Air Transport Association (IATA).
- April 1 – (Germany) Deutsche Lufthansa AG (often simply Lufthansa) - the newly re-founded airline commenced scheduled flight operations out of West Germany, restarting both domestic and international services. Cargo flights were introduced in the airline’s schedules on domestic routes in 1956. International services, including connections to key European capitals, followed shortly thereafter; transatlantic routes (e.g., Hamburg – New York) began in May–June 1955, marking the airline’s entry into long-haul operations. In the later years Lufthansa would become a major player in the air cargo industry.

=== 1956 ===
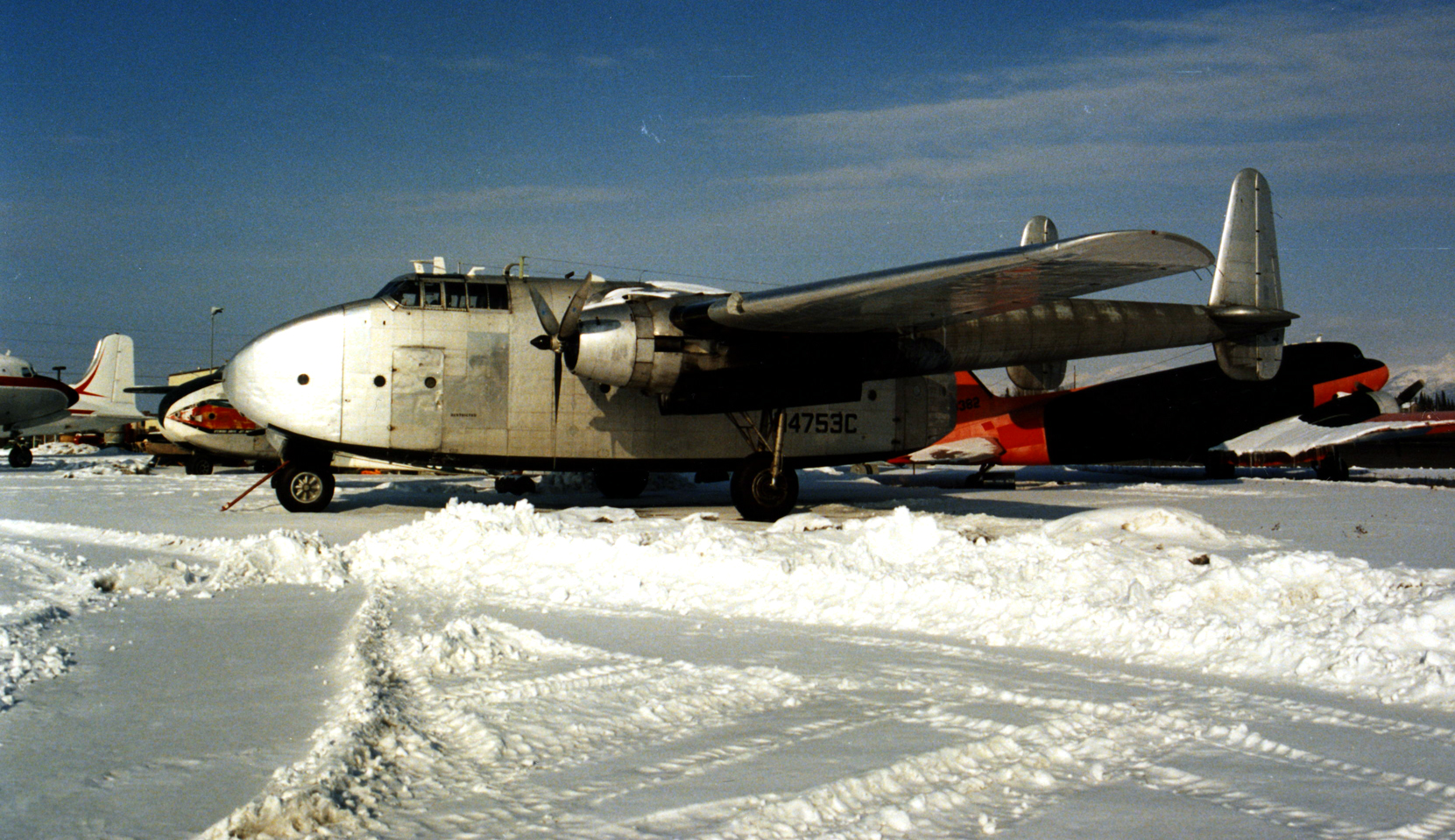
Northern Air Cargo Fairchild C-82A "Packet", N4753C, at Anchorage Airport, Nov. 4, 1985

- Undated – (United States) Northern Air Cargo (NAC) – founded in 1956 as a charter freight service in Alaska by Robert “Bobby” Sholton and Maurice Carlson, initially operating with military-surplus Fairchild C-82 Packet aircraft. It became one of the longest continuously operating all-cargo airlines in the United States.

=== 1957 ===
- April 6 – (Greece) Olympic Airways – established by shipping magnate Aristotle Onassis after buying TAE National Greek Airlines (TAE) from the government; the airline would later play a role in expanding international cargo and mail routes in the Mediterranean and beyond.

=== 1958 ===
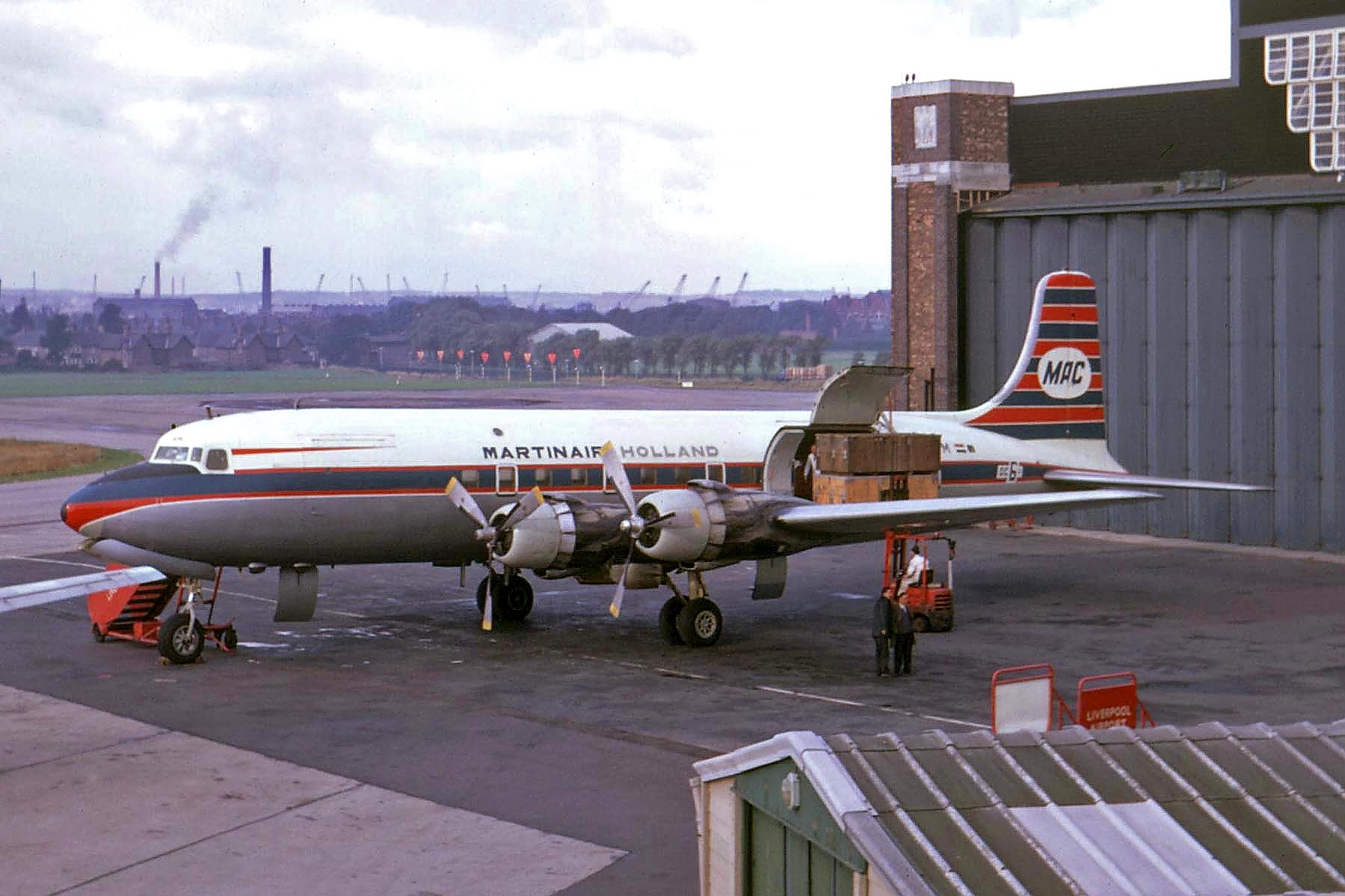
Martinair Holland PH-MAM DC-6A Sep. 23, 1968 (Ken Fielding) - "They'll never fit in there mate!" They did eventually, by sliding them in sideways at 45 degrees but it took them all afternoon with that tiny forklift. A hi-loader with a rollerball bed would have worked a treat but they hadn't been invented in 1968.

- May 24 – (Netherlands) Martinair — founded in Amsterdam, started as a passenger and cargo carrier; today it is fully focused on freight operations integrated into the Air France-KLM Cargo network. Over decades it became a significant European cargo operator, especially before the wide adoption of wide-body freighters. Martinair is one of the few major European carriers founded in the 1950s that continues to influence air cargo networks into the 21st century.

== First flights ==
This decade, the following aircraft that were or would become important for air cargo and airmail history had their first flight:

=== 1950 ===
- June 20 – (United Kingdom) Blackburn B-101 Beverley – a heavy transport aircraft produced by the British aircraft manufacturer Blackburn Aircraft. It was notably the only land-based transport aeroplane built by Blackburn, a company that otherwise specialised in producing naval fighter aircraft.

=== 1951 ===
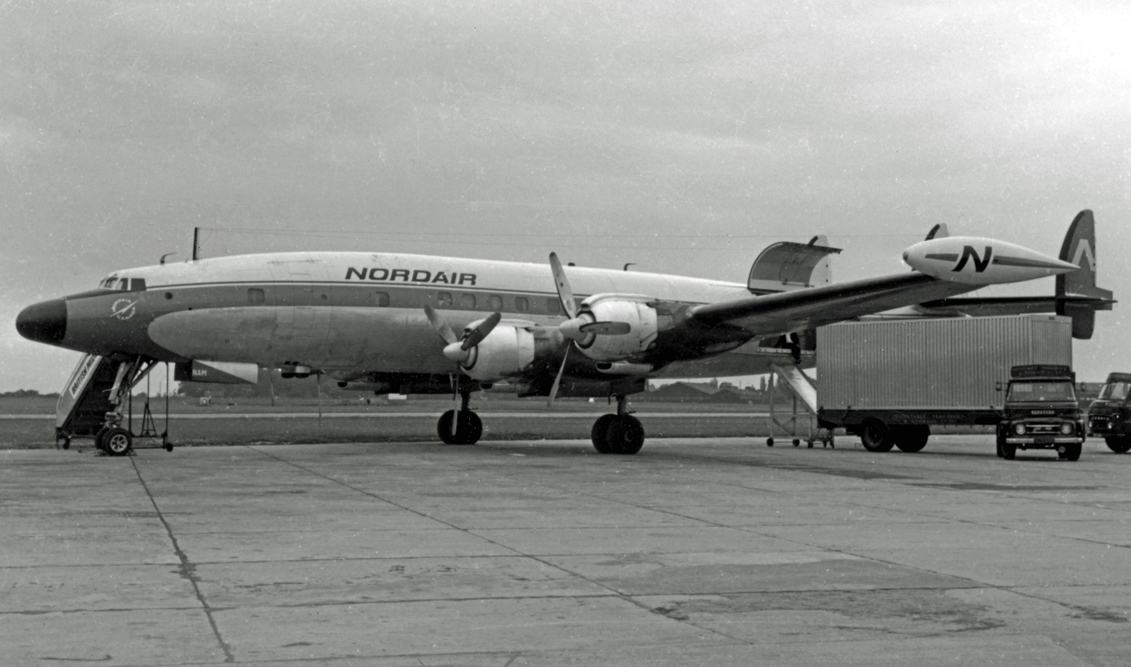
Lockheed L-1049H Super Constellation freighter of Nordair Canada at Manchester (Ringway) Airport in 1966.

- July 14 – (United States) Lockheed L-1049 Super Constellation – an American aircraft, a member of the Lockheed Constellation aircraft line. The aircraft was colloquially referred to as the Super Connie. The L-1049 was Lockheed's response to the successful Douglas DC-6 airliner, first flying in 1950. The aircraft was produced for both the United States Navy as the WV / R7V and U.S. Air Force as the C-121 for transport, electronics, and airborne early warning and control aircraft. Freighter and mixed passenger/freight versions have been built.

=== 1952 ===
- August 16 – (United Kingdom) Bristol Type 175 Britannia – a medium-to-long-range airliner built by the Bristol Aeroplane Company in 1952 to meet British civilian aviation needs. Also, all cargo as well as mixed passenger freight variants were built and used for military as well as civil purposes.

=== 1953 ===
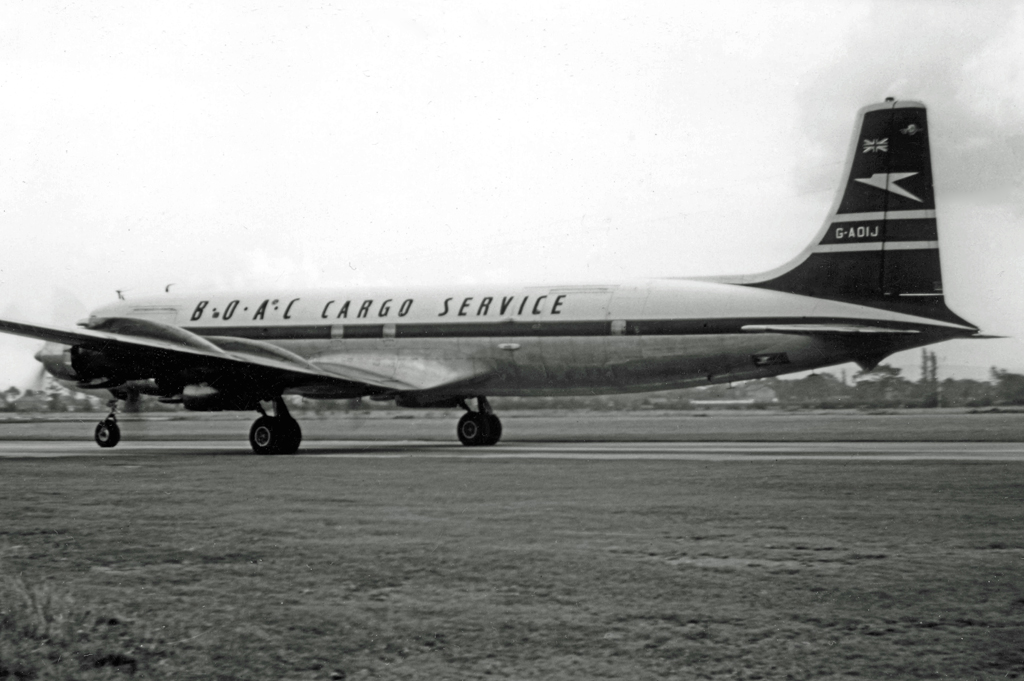
Douglas DC-7CF freighter G-AOIJ of BOAC at Manchester Airport UK in 1961.

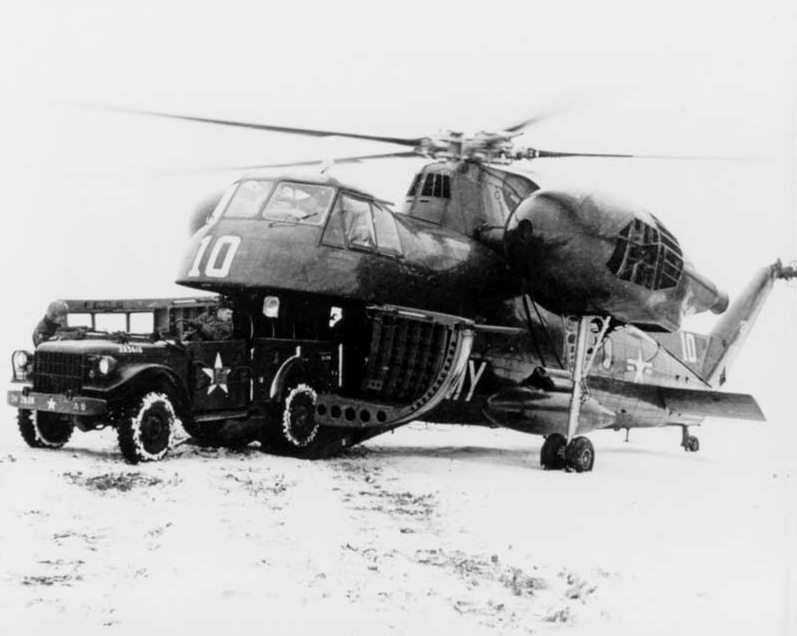
A U.S. Army Sikorsky CH-37 (S-56) Mojave helicopter loading a Dodge WC jeep.

- May 18 – (United States) Douglas DC-7 – an airliner built by the Douglas Aircraft Company from 1953 to 1958. A derivative of the DC-6, it was the last major piston engine-powered passenger aircraft made by Douglas, being developed shortly after the earliest jet airliner—the de Havilland Comet—entered service and only a few years before the jet-powered Douglas DC-8 first flew in 1958. Starting in 1959 Douglas began converting DC-7s and DC-7Cs into DC-7F freighters to extend their useful lives. The airframes were fitted with large forward and rear freight doors and some cabin windows were removed.
- December 16 – (United States) Sikorsky CH-37 Mojave (company designation S-56) – a large heavy-lift military helicopter. It entered service as the HR2S-1 Deuce with USMC in 1956, and as the H-37A Mojave with the U.S. Army that same year. In the early 1960s, the designation was standardized to CH-37 for both services, with the HR2S-1 redesignated as CH-37C specifically. The design includes a front-loading ramp with side opening clam shell doors on the nose. At the time of delivery, the CH-37 was the largest helicopter in the Western world and it was Sikorsky's first twin-engine helicopter.

=== 1954 ===
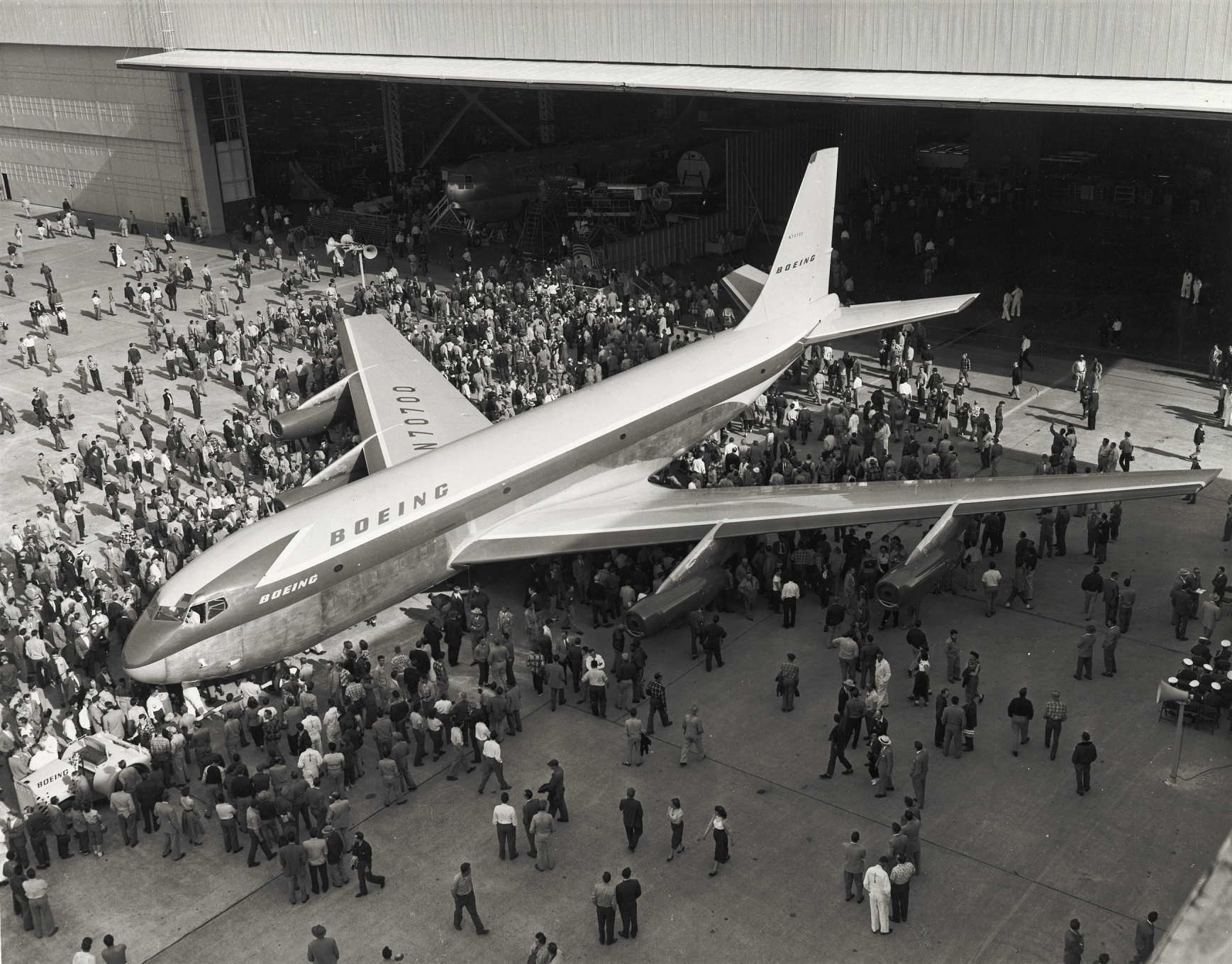
Rollout of Boeing 367-80 (707 prototype, r/n N70700) at the Boeing plant, Renton, Washington, May 14, 1954.

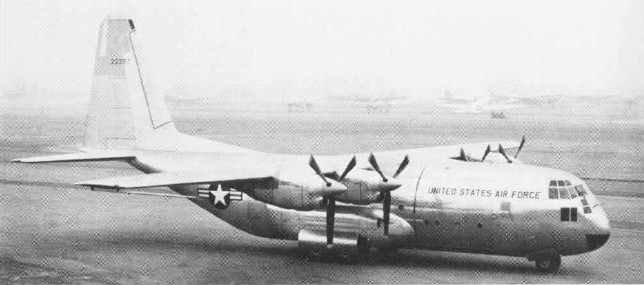
The Lockheed YC-130A Hercules prototype, which first flew on 23 August 1954.

- July 15 – (United States) Boeing 367-80 also known as the Dash 80 – a retired American four-engined prototype jet aircraft by Boeing to demonstrate the advantages of jet propulsion for commercial aviation. It served as basis for the design of the KC-135 tanker and the 707 airliner.
- August 23 – (United States) Lockheed C-130 Hercules – an American four-engine turboprop military transport aircraft designed and built by Lockheed (now Lockheed Martin). Capable of using unprepared runways for takeoffs and landings, the C-130 was designed as a troop, medevac, and cargo transport aircraft. The versatile airframe has found uses in other roles, including as a gunship (AC-130), for airborne assault, search and rescue, scientific research support, weather reconnaissance, aerial refueling, maritime patrol, and aerial firefighting. It is the main tactical airlifter for many military forces worldwide. More than 40 variants of the Hercules, including civilian versions marketed as the Lockheed L-100, operate in more than 60 nations.

=== 1955 ===
- August 25 – (United Kingdom) Handley Page HPR.7 Dart Herald – a British turboprop passenger aircraft, designed in the 1950s as a DC-3 replacement, but only entering service in the 1960s by which time it faced stiff competition from Fokker (F27 Friendship) and Avro (Avro/Hawker Siddeley HS748). Sales were disappointing, contributing in part to the demise of Handley Page in 1970. A side loading military transport was delivered to the Royal Malaysian Air Force. Also several commercial full freighter versions were proposed but never built.
- November 24 – (Netherlands) Fokker F27 Friendship – a turboprop airliner developed and manufactured by the Dutch aircraft manufacturer Fokker. It is the most numerous post-war aircraft manufactured in the Netherlands; the F27 was also one of the most successful European airliners of its era. Several civil mixed passenger / cargo (combi or quick change) versions and military troopship / cargo versions were built.

=== 1956 ===
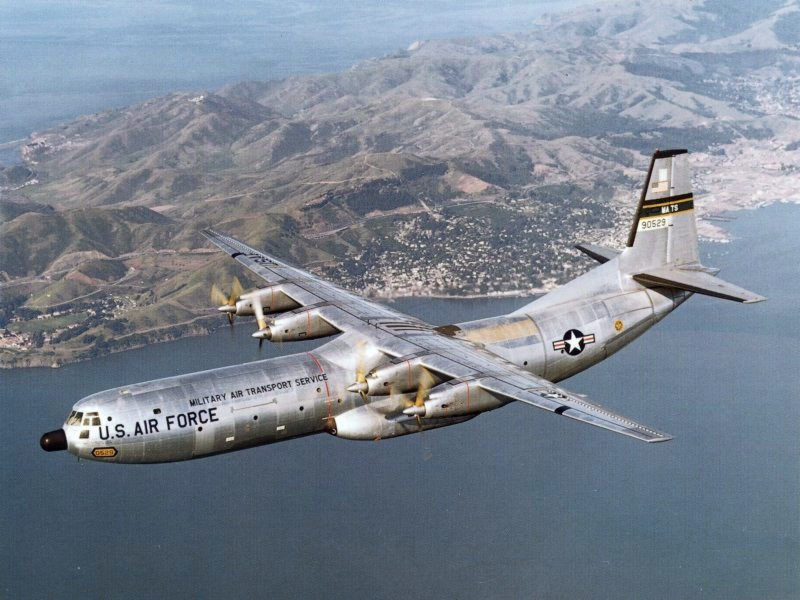
A U.S. Air Force Douglas C-133B-DL Cargomaster (s/n 59-0529) of the 1501st Air Transport Wing over San Francisco Bay in 1960.

- April 23 – (United States) Douglas C-133 Cargomaster — designed as a US Air Force large strategic transport with rear and side cargo doors and long cargo bay — made its first flight on 23 April 1956. This aircraft would go on to set transport records and carry outsized payloads (including early ballistic missiles) long distances for MATS operations later.
- October 22 – (United States) Bell 204/205 – the civilian versions of the UH-1 Iroquois single-engine medium-lift military helicopter of the Huey family of helicopters. They are type-certificated in the transport category and are used in a wide variety of applications, including crop dusting, cargo lifting, Forestry Operations, and aerial firefighting. Bell 204B: Could carry approximately 3,000 lbs (1,360 kg) of cargo, or 8–9 passengers. Bell 205A1: Had a larger capacity, capable of carrying 4,000 lbs (1,815 kg) of cargo internally, or up to 5,000 lbs (2,270 kg) on an external sling load.

=== 1957 ===
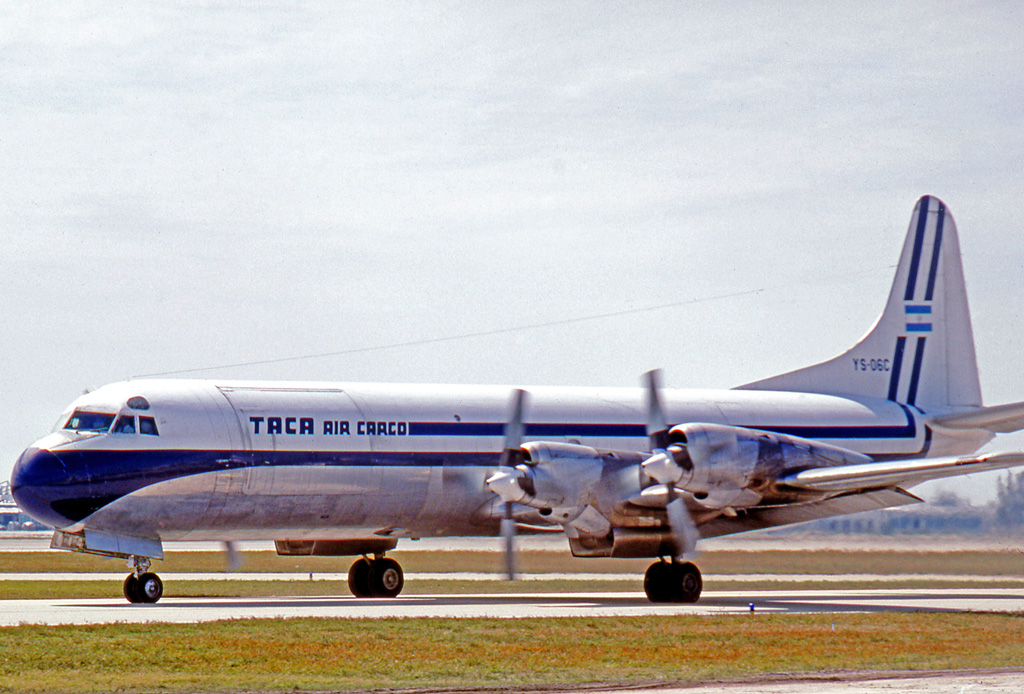
Lockheed L-188AF Electra freighter YS-06C of TACA Cargo at Miami International Airport in 1978.

- July 4 – (Soviet Union) Ilyushin Il-18 – a large turboprop airliner that became one of the best known Soviet aircraft of its era. The Il-18 was one of the Soviet Union's principal airliners for several decades and was widely exported. Freighter and mixed passenger/freight and combi variants have been built.
- December 6 – (United States) Lockheed L-188 Electra a turboprop airliner built by the Lockheed Corporation. It was the first large turboprop airliner built in the United States. Freighter and passenger/freight variants have been built.
- December 20 – (United States) Boeing 707 - although primarily a passenger aircraft initially, the 707 family would soon be adapted for cargo and mail use and is generally acknowledged as the platform that ushered in the Jet Age for both passengers and freight. Dedicated or convertible 707 cargo versions — such as the 707-320C “combi” with a large main deck cargo door — were introduced later (early 1960s) to support mixed pax/cargo or all-cargo operations.

=== 1958 ===
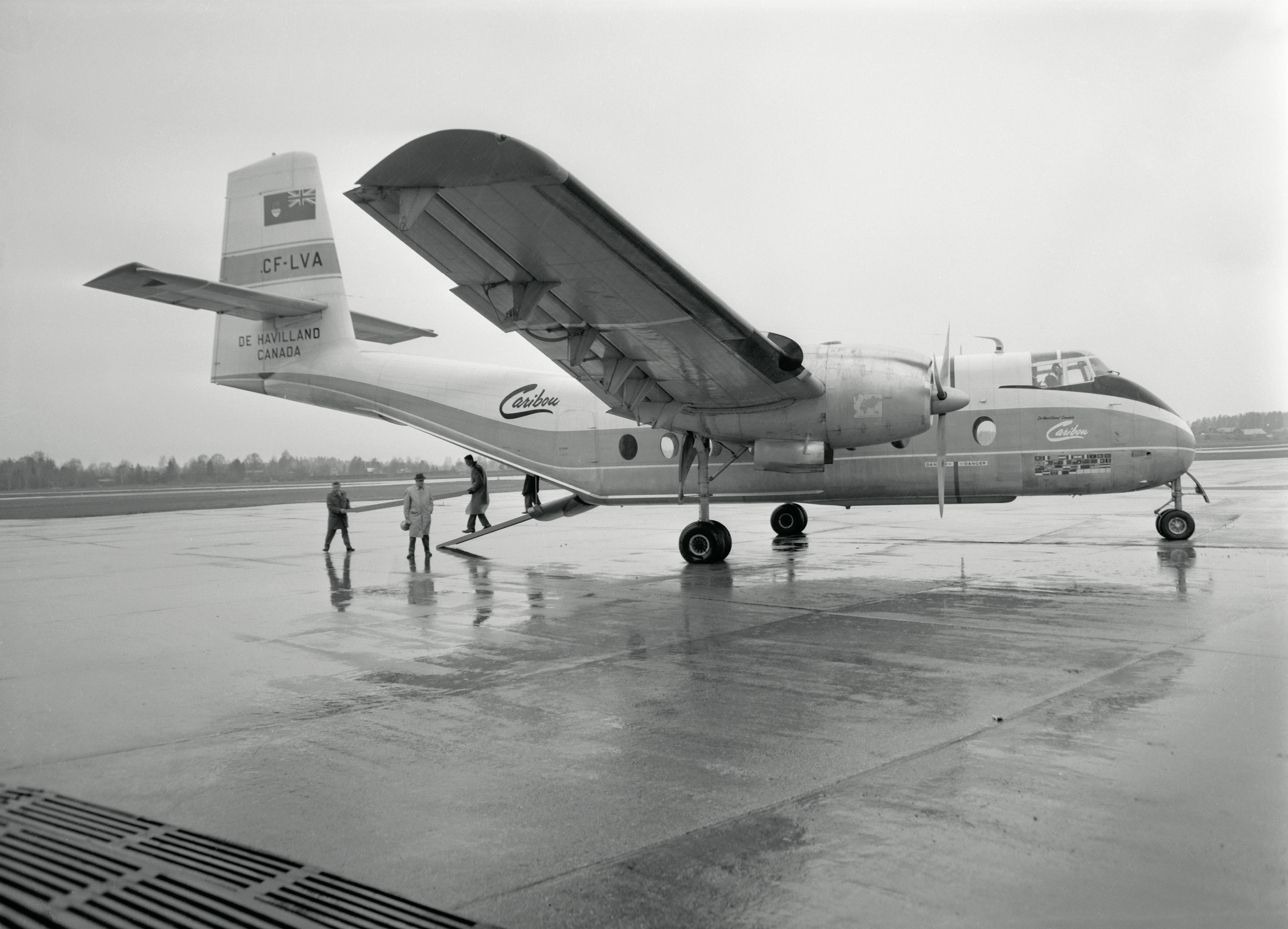
A de Havilland Canada DHC-4 Caribou CF-LVA aeroplane on Malmi airport in Finland on April 25th 1960.

- April 22 – (United States) Boeing Vertol Model 107, predecessor to the CH-46 Sea Knight – an American medium-lift tandem-rotor transport helicopter powered by twin turboshaft engines.
- July 30 – (Canada) de Havilland Canada DHC-4 Caribou (designated by the United States military as the CV-2 and later C-7 Caribou) – a specialized cargo aircraft with short takeoff and landing (STOL) capability developed by de Havilland Canada. The Caribou is still in use in small numbers as a rugged bush airplane today.

=== 1959 ===
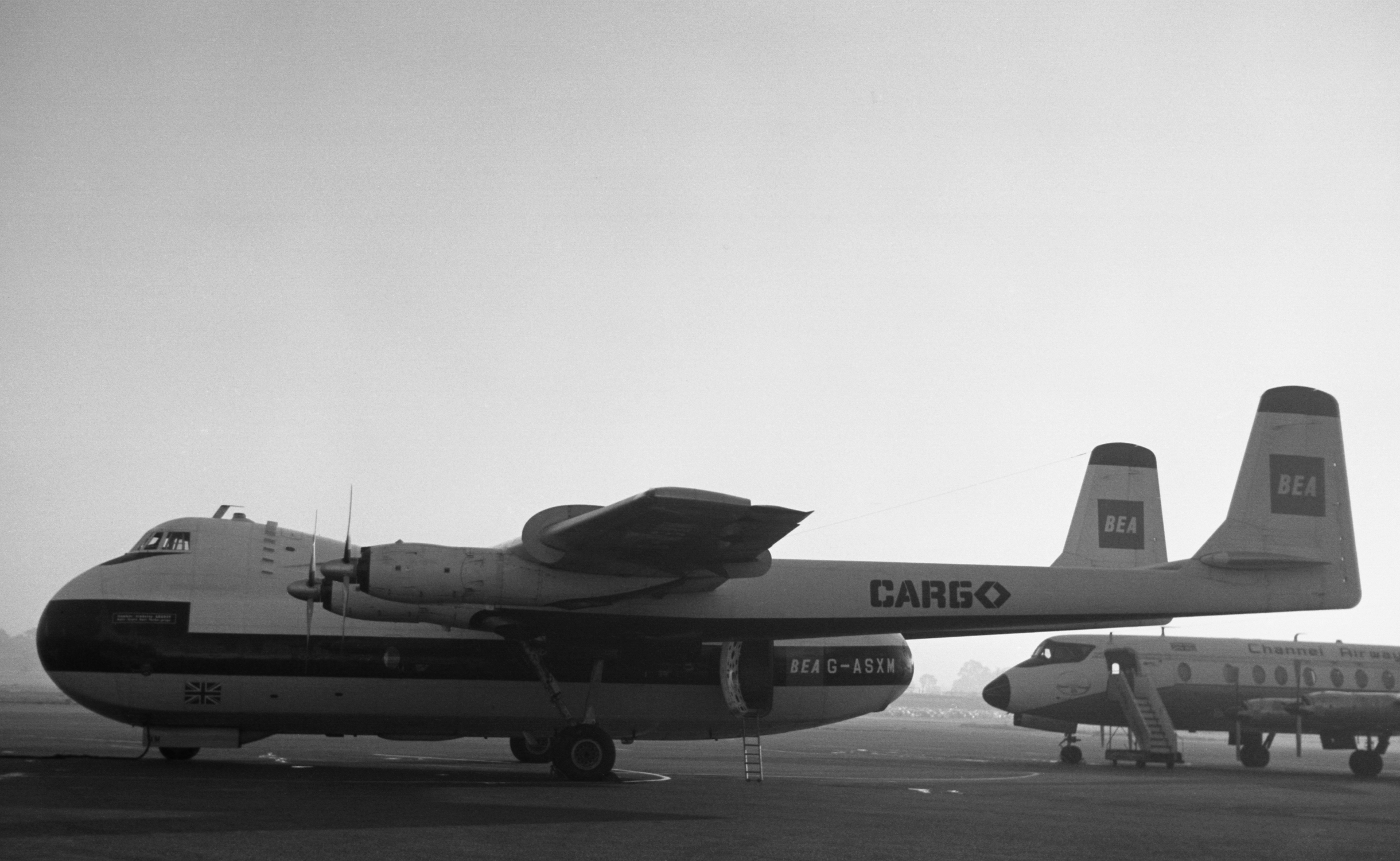
Armstrong Whitworth AW.660 Argosy 222 G-ASXM, BEA Cargo, Southend, UK, Sep 21, 1967.

- January 8 – (United Kingdom) Armstrong Whitworth AW.650/AW.660 Argosy – a four-engined turboprop medium-range transport/cargo aircraft, capable of carrying a maximum payload of 28,000 lb (approx. 12,700 kg or 12.7 tonnes) of freight.
- January 20 – (United Kingdom) Vickers Vanguard – a short/medium-range turboprop airliner designed and produced by the British aircraft manufacturer Vickers-Armstrongs. In the late 60's Cargoliner and Merchantman freighter conversions appeared.
- October 29 – (Soviet Union) Antonov An-24 – a 44-seat twin turboprop transport/passenger aircraft designed by the Antonov Design Bureauand manufactured by the Kyiv, Irkutsk and Ulan-Ude Aviation Factories. It was the first of a future family of turboprops by Antonov. Freighter / military transport versions have been built.

== Accidents and incidents ==
This decade, the following air cargo or airmail related accidents and incidents took place:

=== 1950 ===
- May 30 – (Brazil) see 1950 in aviation also: After an Aerovias Brasil Douglas C-47-DL Skytrain (registration PP-AVZ) begins a descent from 10,000 feet (3,000 meters) through clouds, it encounters severe turbulence that causes the displacement of passengers and cargo. The crew loses control of the aircraft, which enters a dive too steep for its design limits, loses both its wings, and crashes near Ilhéus, Brazil, killing 13 of the 15 people on board.
- July 29 – (France / Algeria) see 1950 in aviation also: The starboard wing fuel tank of a Compagnie Air Transport (CAT) Bristol 170 Freighter 21 (registration F-BENF) explodes in flight, leading to multiple structural failures. The aircraft crashes in the Tanezrouft area of French Algeria, killing all 26 people on board. At the time it is the deadliest aviation accident in the history of Algeria.

=== 1951 ===
- October 15 – (United States) see 1951 in aviation also: A United States Air Force Boeing C-97A Stratofreighter disappeared over the North Atlantic Ocean during a flight from Lajes Field in the Azores to Westover Air Force Base in Massachusetts, with the loss of all 12 people on board.

=== 1952 ===
- October – (Pakistan) see 1952 in aviation also: An Orient Airways cargo flight from Karachi to Dacca was crashed. One of three was killed in this crash.
- December 20 – (United States) see 1952 in aviation also: A U.S. Air Force C-124 Globemaster crashed shortly after take-off, resulting in significant loss of life.

=== 1953 ===
- January 7 – (United States) A Douglas DC-4 N86574, owned and operated by the Flying Tiger Line, crashed two miles south of Issaquah, Washington, during an instrument approach to Boeing Field, Seattle, Washington. All seven occupants were killed.
- September 1 – (United States) see 1953 in aviation also: A Regina Cargo Airlines Douglas C-47K Skytrain (registration N19941) crashed southeast of Vail, Washington, killing all 21 people on board. It was carrying military personnel on a charter flight from Fort Ord in Monterey, California, to McChord Air Force Base in Tacoma, Washington,
- December 4 – (Spain) see 1953 in aviation also: An Aviaco Bristol 170 Freighter 21 crashed into the side of a mountain peak obscured by rain near Guadarrama, Spain, 20 minutes prior to an anticipated landing at Barajas Airport in Madrid, killing 23 of the 33 people on board.

=== 1954 ===
- March 28 – (Norway) see 1954 in aviation also: After a successful mail-drop mission at Bear Island, Norway, a Royal Norwegian Air Force Boeing Canada Catalina IVB attempted a low pass over the island at an altitude of 100 meters (330 feet). Its right wing hit the ground during a right turn and it crashed, killing eight of the nine people on board.
- April 13 – (Chile) see 1954 in aviation also: A Chilean Air Force Douglas C-47-DL Skytrain with nine passengers, five crew members, and a cargo of 2,500 kilograms (5,500 pounds) of meat on board crashed near Batuco, Chile, during a domestic flight from Santiago to Los Cóndores Air Base in Iquique, killing all 14 people on board.
- June 3 – (Yugoslavia) see 1954 in aviation also: Near Maribor, Yugoslavia, a Yugoslav Air Force Mikoyan-Gurevich MiG-15 (NATO reporting name "Fagot") attacked a Sabena Douglas DC-3 (registration OO-CBY) on a cargo flight from the United Kingdom to Yugoslavia, inflicting significant damage on it, killing its radio operator, and wounding its captain and flight engineer. Its copilot made a forced landing at Graz Airport in Austria.
- June 27 – (United States) see 1954 in aviation also: Arriving from Altus Air Force Base in Altus, Oklahoma, a U.S. Air Force Boeing KC-97G-25-BO Stratofreighter (registration 52–2654) crashed into Box Springs Mountain north of Riverside, California, while attempting to divert from its destination, March Air Force Base in Riverside, to Norton Air Force Base in San Bernardino, California, due to poor weather at Riverside. The crash killed all 14 people on board.
- August 16 – (Vietnam) see 1954 in aviation also: An Air Vietnam Bristol Type 170 Freighter on a domestic flight in Vietnam from Hanoi to Saigon carrying refugees from the Red River delta suffered engine trouble and attempted to divert to an emergency landing at Pakse, Laos. While on approach to Pakse, it crashed into a tributary of the Mekong River, killing 47 of the 55 people on board. It was the deadliest aviation accident in the history of newly independent Laos at the time and would be the deadliest in history involving a Bristol Freighter.

=== 1955 ===
- December 17 – (United States) see 1955 in aviation also: A Riddle Airlines C-46 freighter disintegrated in flight over South Carolina with the loss of both pilots, the only people on board. The cause is traced to nonconforming elevator parts installed as part of conversion performed overseas by a contractor which created its own parts, leaving the aircraft ineligible for an airworthiness certificate.

=== 1957 ===
- March 22 – (United States) see 1957 in aviation also: A United States Air Force Boeing C-97 Stratofreighter with 67 people aboard disappears during a flight from Wake Island to Japan. No trace of the aircraft has been found.
- April 15 – (Mexico) see 1957 in aviation also: A TAMSA Consolidated C-87 Liberator Express transport aircraft (registration XA-KUN) converted for use as a civilian cargo aircraft crashes into a street in Mérida, Mexico, shortly after takeoff from Mérida-Rejón Airport, killing a child on the ground and the plane's entire crew of three. Among the dead is the Mexican actor and singer Pedro Infante, who had been co-piloting the plane.

=== 1958 ===
- February 27 – (United Kingdom) see 1958 in aviation also: The Silver City Airways Bristol 170 Freighter G-AICS, travelling from Ronaldsway Airport, Ballasalla, on the Isle of Man to Ringway Airport in Manchester, England, crashed into Winter Hill, Rivington Moor, Lancashire, in North West England in bad weather, killing 35 of the 42 people on board and injuring all seven survivors.
- May 25 – (United Kingdom / India) see 1958 in aviation also: A Dan-Air Avro 685 York C.1 cargo aircraft suffered an in-flight engine fire and crashed during a forced landing near Gurgaon, Haryana, India, killing four of the five-person crew.
- September 2 – (United Kingdom) see 1958 in aviation also: An Independent Air Travel Vickers VC.1 Viking cargo aircraft carrying two Bristol Proteus turboprop engines suffered engine trouble soon after takeoff from London Heathrow Airport. While attempting to reach Blackbushe Airport for an emergency landing, the Viking crashed into a row of houses in Southall, London, killing its entire crew of three and a mother and three children on the ground.

=== 1959 ===
- November 24 – (United States) see 1959 in aviation also: TWA Flight 595, a cargo flight operated by a Lockheed L-1049H Super Constellation, crashed after entering an excessive bank while turning back to Chicago-Midway Airport due to a suspected engine fire. All three people aboard the plane and eight people on the ground die in the crash. The Civil Aeronautics Board's Bureau of Aviation Safety — predecessor to the National Transportation Safety Board — concludes that there was no actual fire and determines the cause of the crash to be pilot error.

== Context ==
The air cargo and airmail events of this decade took place within the following historical context:

- 1950s
  - 1950–1953 – Korean War
- 1950
- 1950 in aviation
- 1951
- 1951 in aviation
- 1952
- 1952 in aviation
- 1953
- 1953 in aviation
- 1954
- 1954 in aviation
- 1955
- 1955 in aviation
- 1956
- 1956 in aviation
- 1957
- 1957 in aviation
- 1958
- 1958 in aviation
- 1959
- 1959 in aviation

== Pictures from the decade ==
air cargo and airmail in the decade 1950-1959

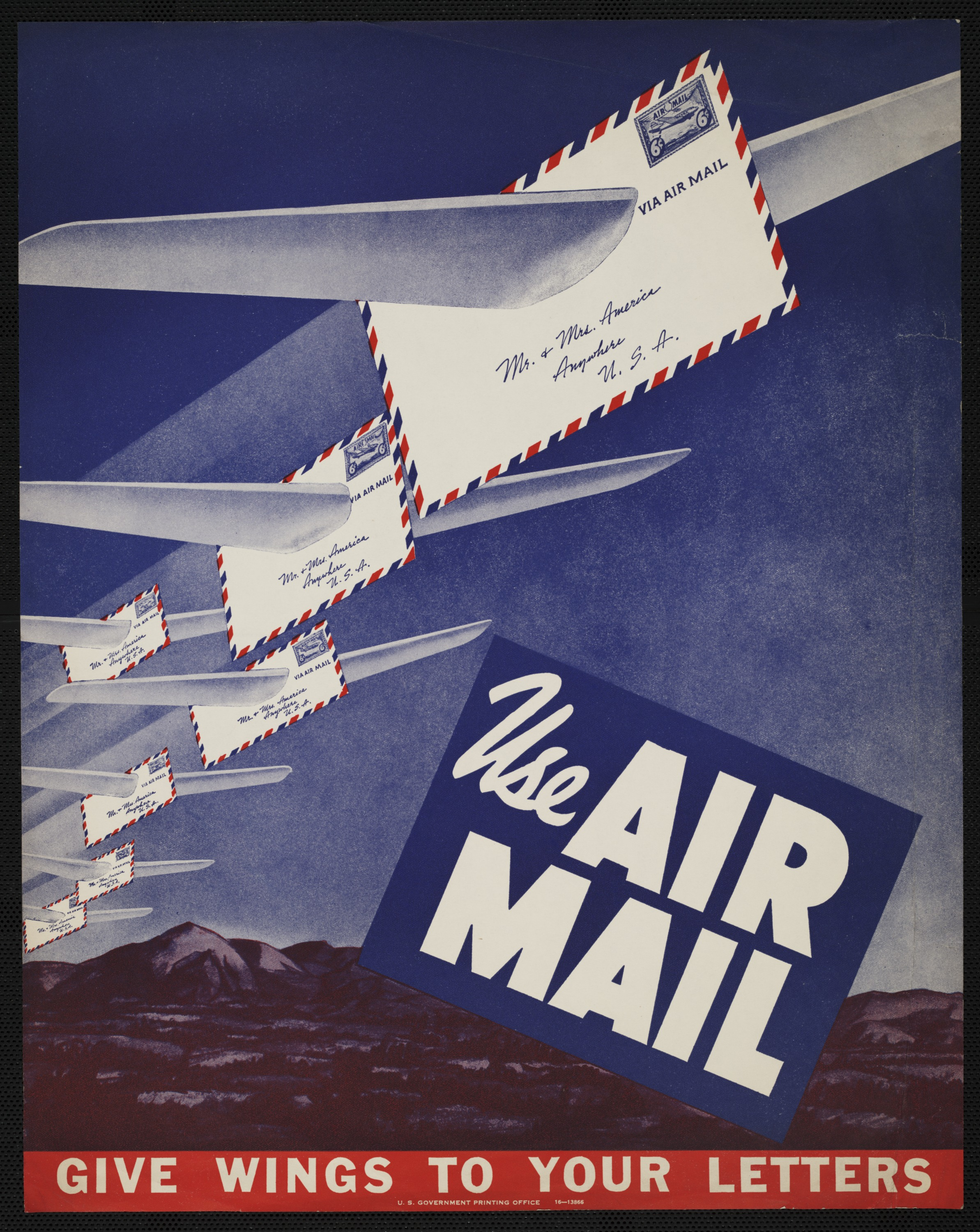
U.S. Airmail poster, 1949-1958. The Post Office Department poster advertized airmail service proclaiming “Use Air Mail. Give Wings to Your Letters.” Several airmail envelopes bearing 6-cent postage stamps wing their way across a hilly landscape and speed their way to their destination, “Mr. & Mrs. America, Anywhere, USA.” From 1918 to 1977, the domestic airmail service and rate structure offered postal customers the option to send their mail via airplanes. More expensive than a first class letter, businesses were the initial adopters to choose airmail for transport of time-sensitive items. As the spending power of Americans’ grew so did the network of airmail routes, and as rates fell, more people opted for airmail service for both their special and regular correspondence.

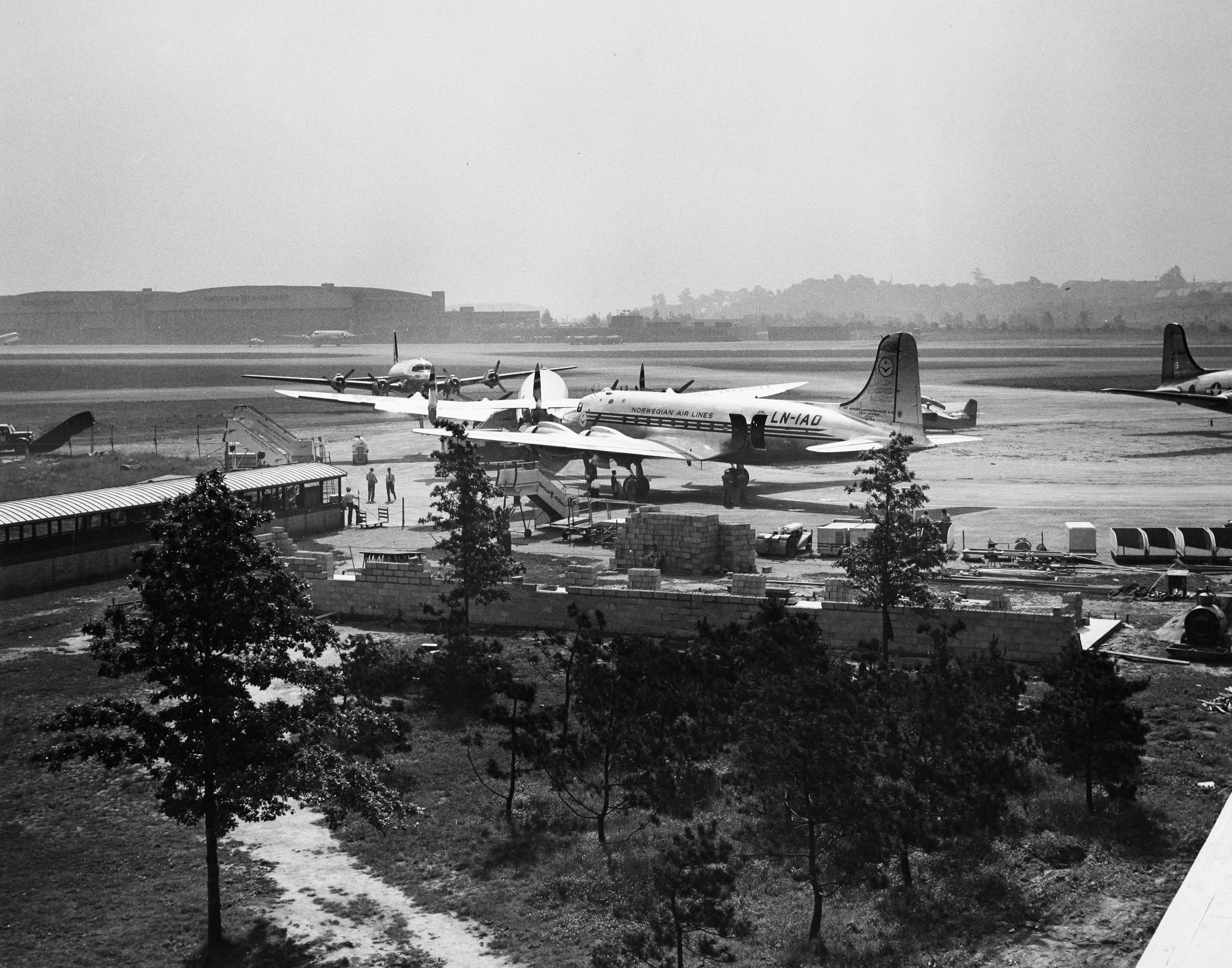
La Guardia Airport LGA, New York. Norwegian Air line DC-4 stands at La Guardia Feild loading platform awaiting the cargo which it flew across the atlantic on its maiden shake-down flight, La Guardia Airport, New York, USA. 1950s.

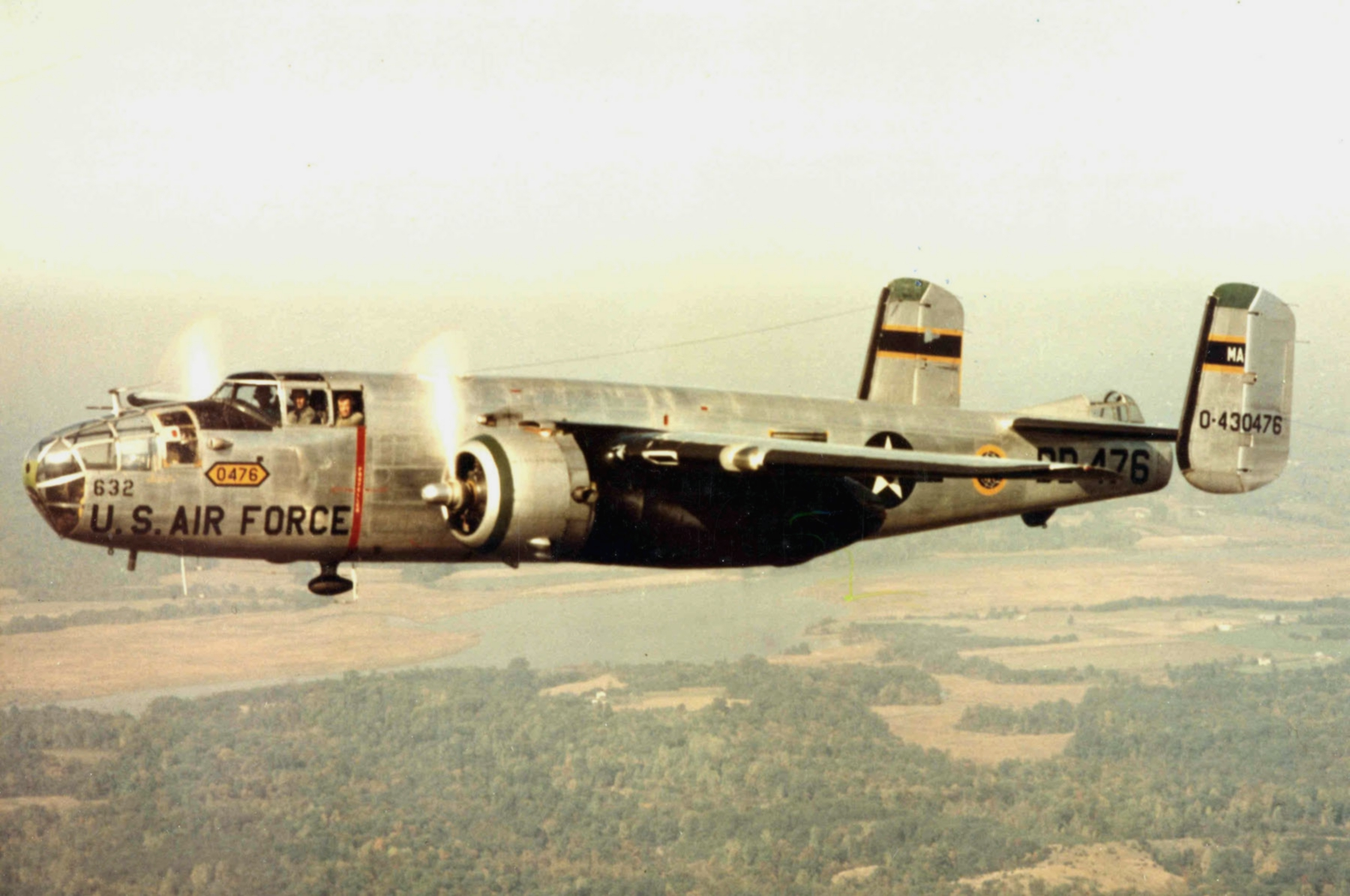
A U.S. Air Force North American CB-25J Mitchell (cargo/transport version; originally B-25J-25-NC, s/n 44-30476) used by the Military Air Transport Service. 1950s.

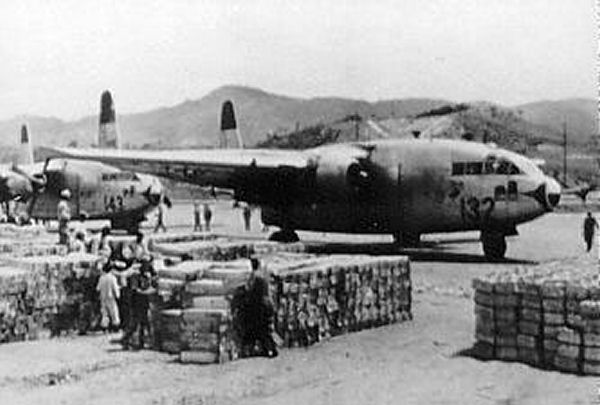
Cargo airlifted from the U.S. to Japan was trans-shipped from Japan to Korea, often by C-119 aircraft such as these, which carried crates of rations, ammo, fuel and medical supplies for front-line troops.

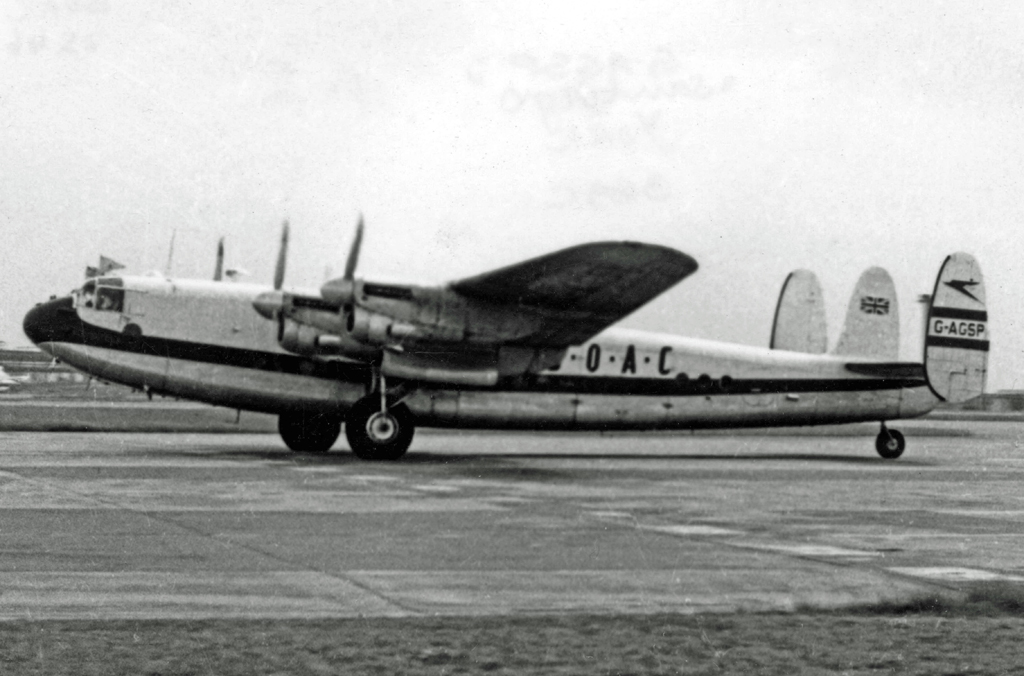
BOAC Avro 685 York G-AGSP operating a freight schedule, June 2, 1953.

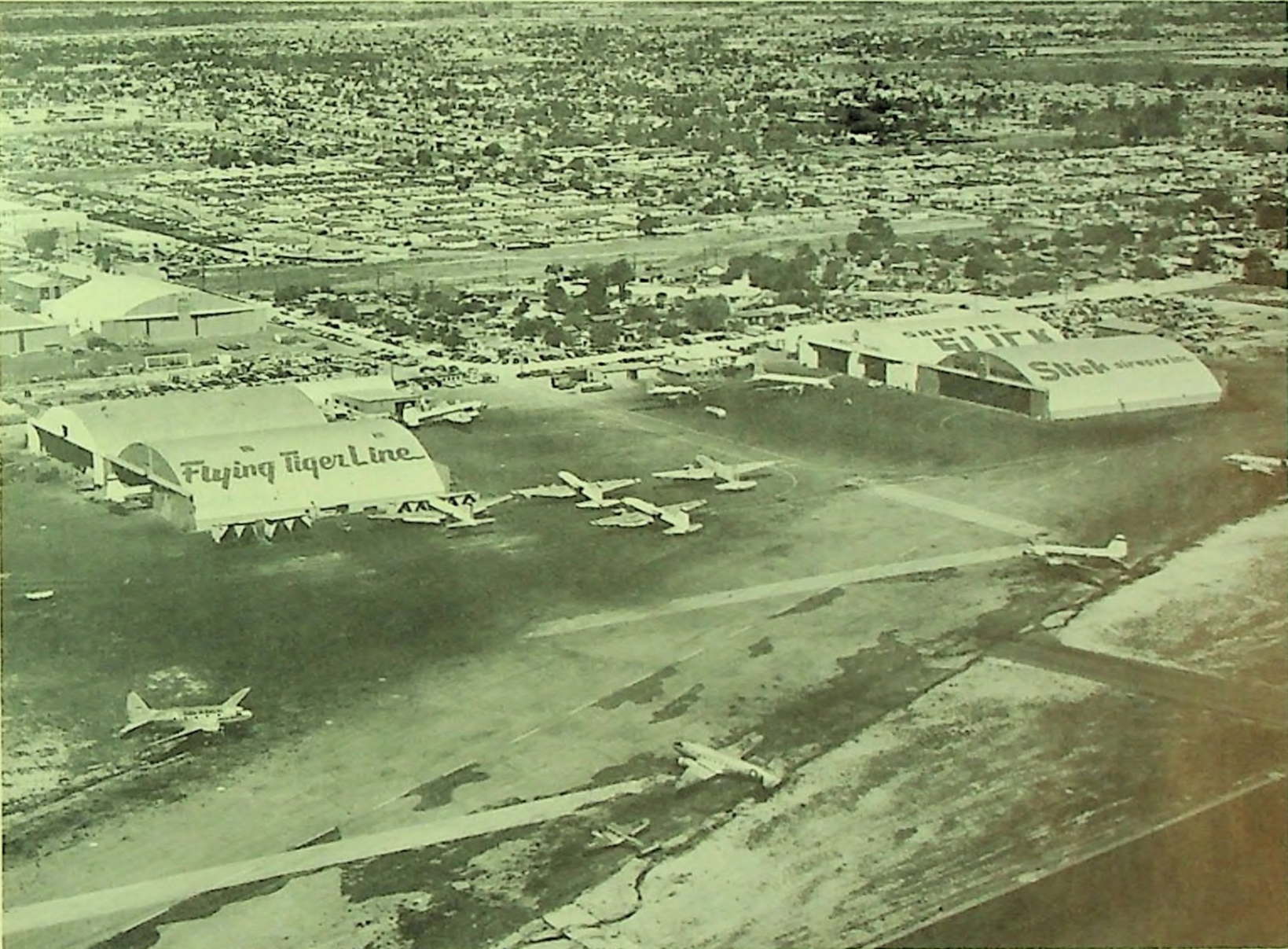
Flying Tiger Line and Slick Airways facilities at Lockheed Air Terminal in Burbank, 1953.

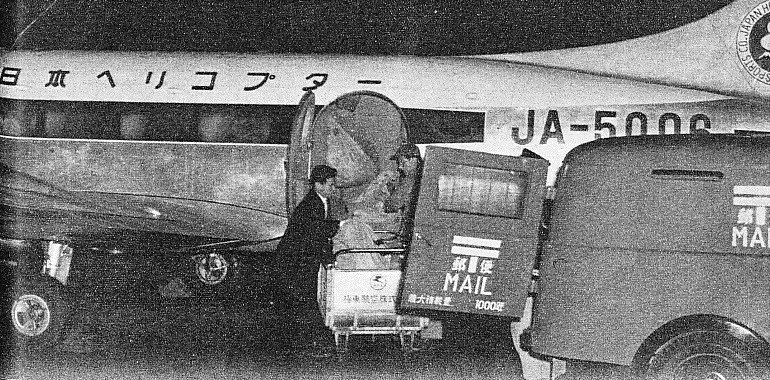
Japanese airmail being loaded on aircraft in the 1950s.

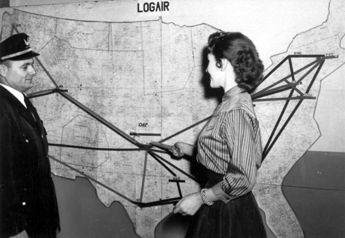
Directing LOGAIR supply flights - ca mid 1950s. Logair was an Air Force domestic air cargo program using civilian airline contractors, 1955.

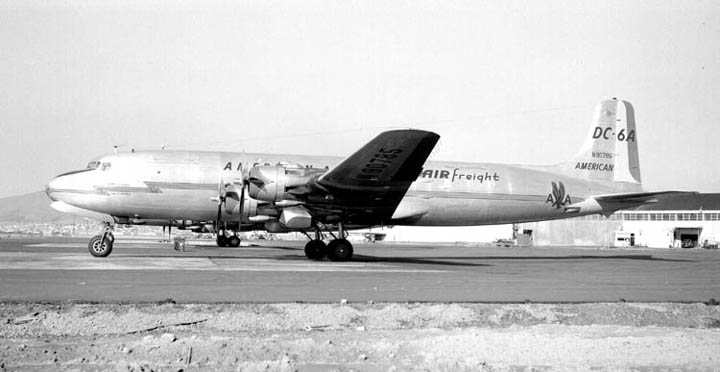
DC-6A, N90785, American Airlines "Airfreighter Baltimore" at San Francisco in 1958.

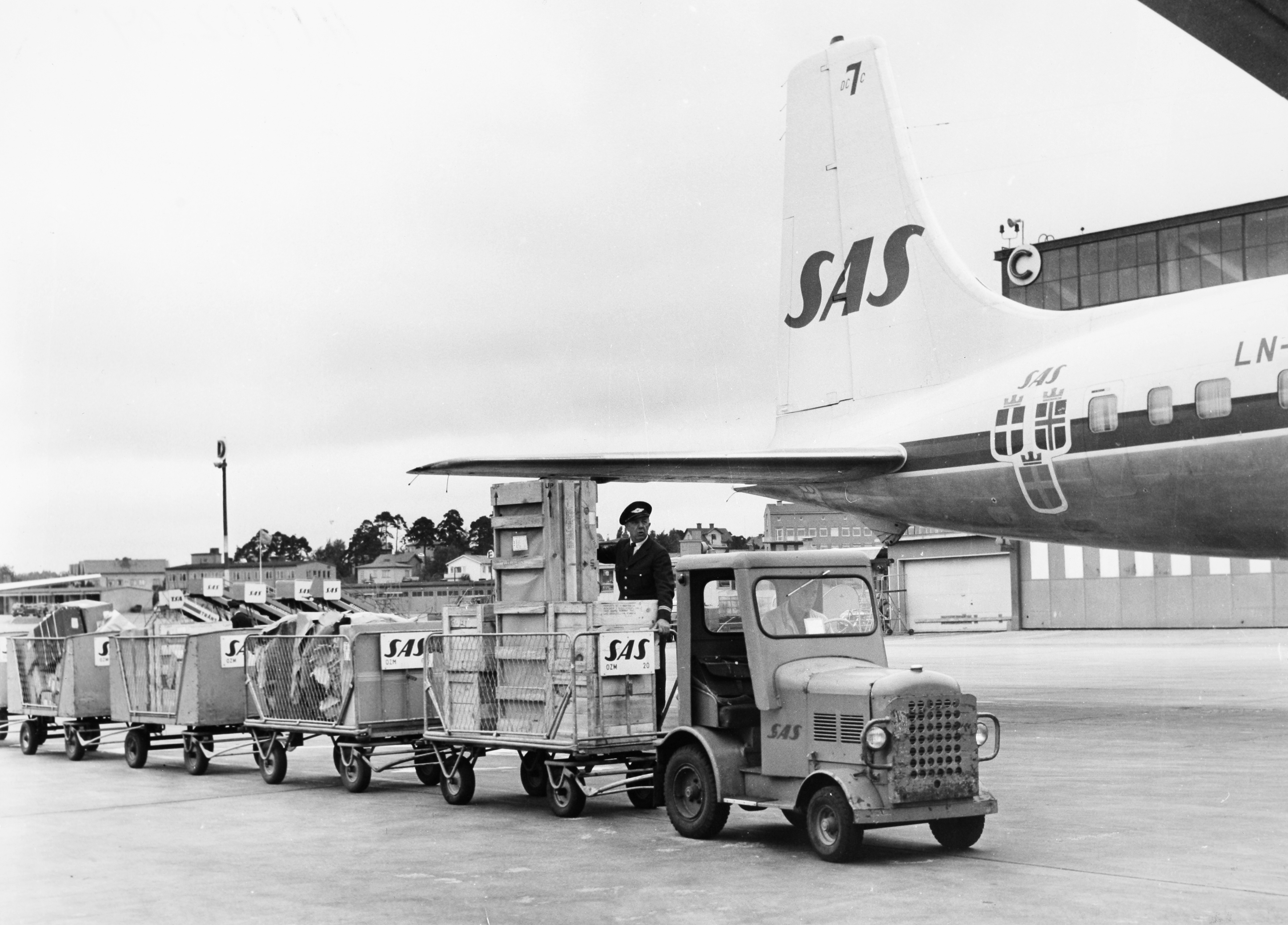
SAS DC-7 Guttorm Viking LN-MOD, Cargo loading at Bromma Airport BMA, Stockholm, 1958.

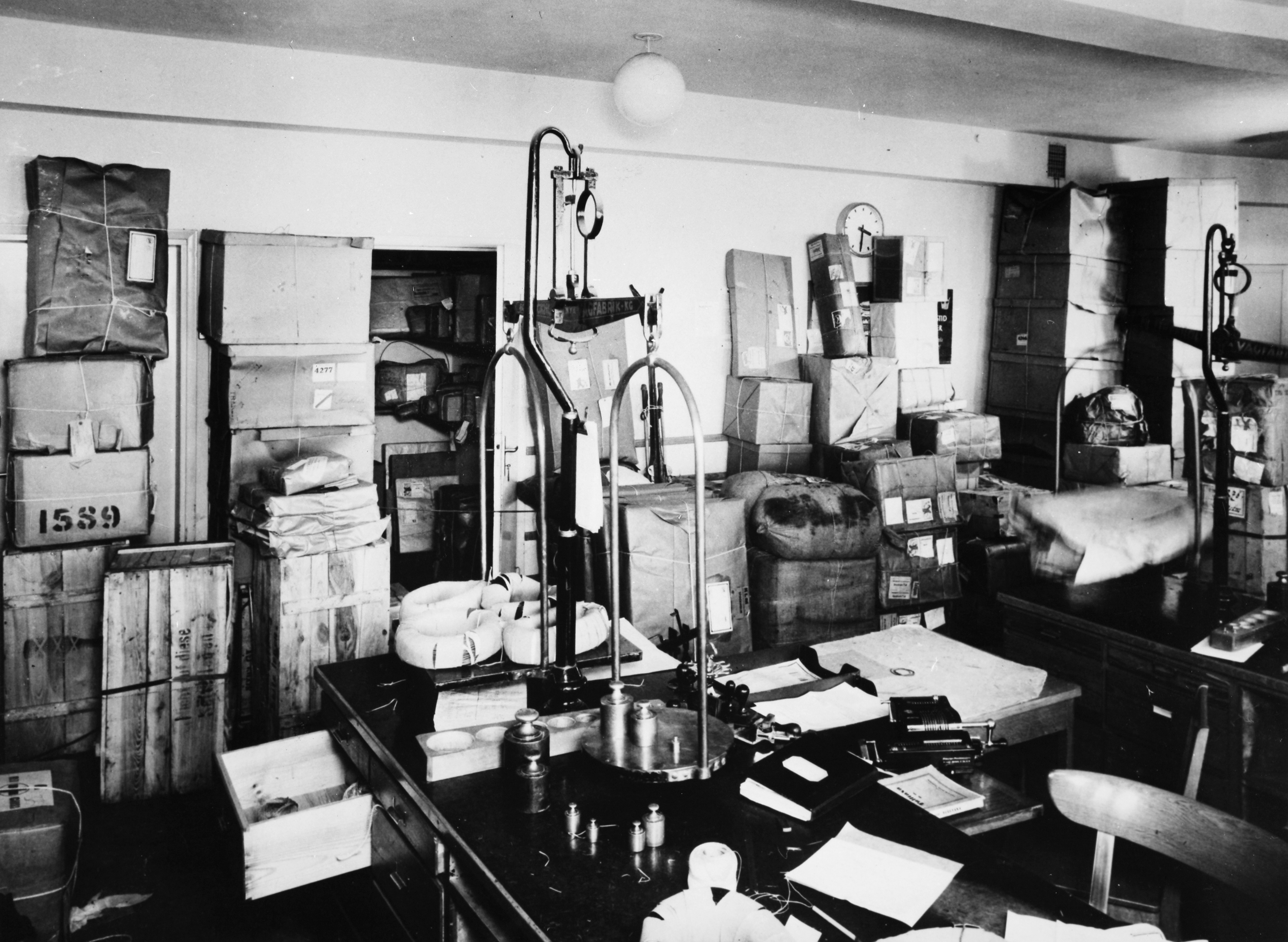
SAS Cargo department at Bromma International Airport BMA, Stockholm, 1950s.

Delivering airmail to an El Al plane at LOD, 1958.

== See also ==
- Timeline of Air Cargo
- 1910s in air cargo
- 1920s in air cargo
- 1930s in air cargo
- 1940s in air cargo
- 1960s in air cargo
