= Operation Safe Haven =

Operation Safe Haven or Operation Safehaven may refer to:

- Operation Safehaven (1944–48), investigation into German assets in foreign countries after World War II
- Operation Safe Haven (1957), evacuation of Hungarian refugees to the United States
- Operations Safe Haven and Safe Passage (1994–95), relief of overcrowding at Guantanamo Bay
- Operation Provide Comfort (1991–96), Western protection to Iraqi Kurds
- Operation Safehaven (2003–04), an American investigation into the Warez scene
