= Pan Am Cargo =

American cargo airline

IATA	ICAO	Call sign
-	-	CLIPPER CARGO
- Ceased operations: 1983; 43 years ago
- Hubs: New York-JFK
- Parent company: Pan Am

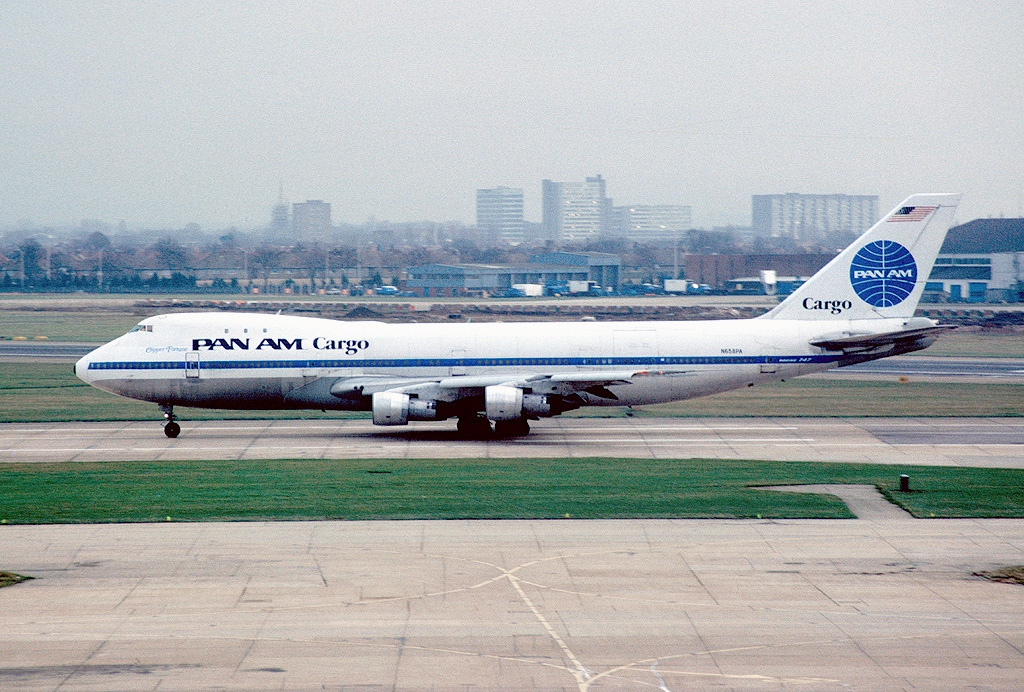
A Boeing 747-100SF of Pan Am Cargo.

Pan Am Cargo or Clipper Cargo was a subsidiary cargo airline of Pan American World Airways. Pan Am Cargo first used piston-engined aircraft such as the Douglas DC-4. On 5 January 1952 the larger DC-6 model was used on the company's first transatlantic all-cargo service. In 1963, Pan Am's all-cargo jet service began with Boeing 707-321Cs that henceforth dominated Pan Am's freight operations.

Pan Am stopped Pan Am Cargo operations in 1983.

== Fleet ==
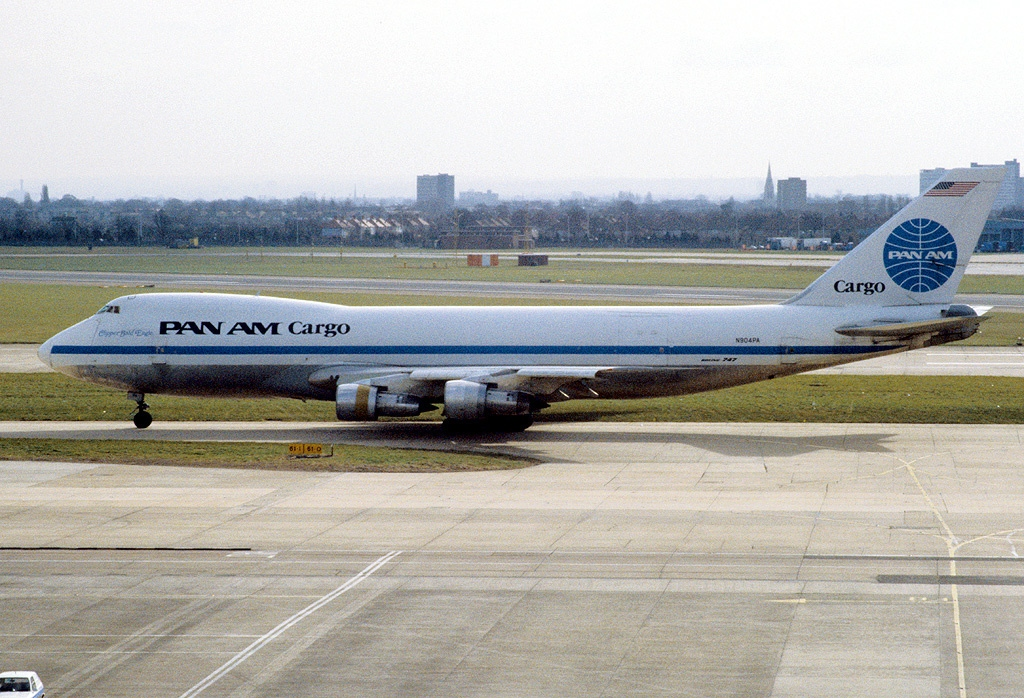
Pan Am Cargo Boeing 747-200F taxiing at Heathrow Airport in 1983

As of its end in 1983, Pan Am Cargo fleet included:

- 4 Boeing 727 (1 in Mexico City)
- 2 Boeing 747-100F
- 2 Boeing 747-200F
- 1 Boeing 747-200C (Leased from World Airways)

== See also ==
- List of defunct airlines of the United States
