= TWA Flight 595 =

Fatal aircraft accident

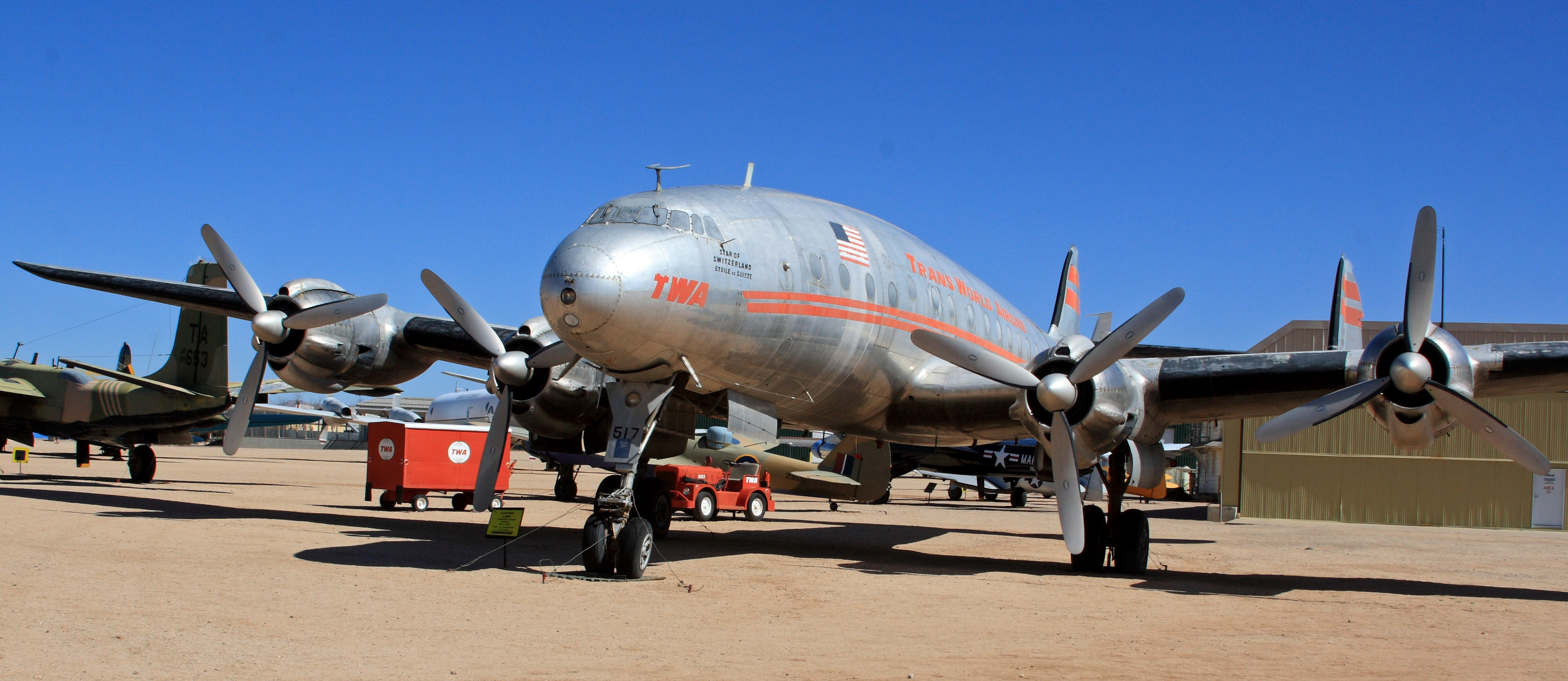
- A TWA Lockheed Constellation similar to the accident aircraft

Occurrence
- Date: 24 November 1959
- Summary: Crashed after entering excessive bank while turning final; pilot error
- Site: Chicago, Illinois
- Total fatalities: 11

Aircraft
- Aircraft type: Lockheed L-1049H Super Constellation
- Operator: Trans World Airlines (TWA)
- Registration: N102R
- Flight origin: Chicago-Midway Airport, Chicago, Illinois
- Destination: Los Angeles International Airport, Los Angeles, California
- Occupants: 3
- Passengers: 0
- Crew: 3
- Fatalities: 3
- Survivors: 0

Ground casualties
- Ground fatalities: 8

TWA Flight 595 was a cargo flight operated from Chicago-Midway Airport in Illinois to Los Angeles International Airport in California. On 24 November 1959 the Lockheed L-1049H Super Constellation operating the flight received a fire warning in its No. 2 engine shortly after departure at Chicago-Midway Airport in cloudy weather and requested to turn back. While turning onto their final approach path they banked excessively exceeding 45 degrees and started rapidly sinking. The aircraft impacted the ground in a residential area at 5:35 am CST about a quarter mile (0.4 km) southeast of the airport, killing all 3 crewmembers on board and 8 people on the ground.

== Accident ==
Flight 595 was a cargo flight flown in a Lockheed L-1049H Super Constellation and piloted by captain Claude W Helwig, First Officer Delmas E Watters, and Flight Engineer Aerion L Auge Jr. On this flight they would be carrying a jet engine and 5,000 pounds of mail among other things. The flight was scheduled to depart Chicago-Midway Airport for Los Angeles International Airport on 24 November 1959 at 3:10 am CST, but was delayed due to a breakdown of the loading equipment delaying the loading of the plane. The aircraft had come in from New York at 2:16 am CST the same morning. The crew filed an IFR flight plan as per TWA procedures and properly inspected the plane. At 5:20 am CST, the aircraft taxied to runway 31L, 2 hours and 20 minutes behind schedule.

At 5:31 am CST, the aircraft acknowledged its takeoff clearance and started its takeoff roll. The tower described the takeoff and climb out as normal; 1 minute and 13 seconds later the crew informed the tower that they were beginning their left turn; seven seconds later the crew informed tower that the No. 2 engine fire warning went off and that they would be returning to the airport. The crew then shut down the No. 2 engine, activated its fire extinguisher, and feathered its propeller. During the next 25 seconds the tower gave the aircraft clearance to land at any runway and offered emergency services. The crew declined the emergency services and told the tower that they would be landing on runway 31.

The tower then asked Flight 595 if they wanted to make an instrument approach via the Kedzie localizer or switch to VFR; the crew responded with "I think we'll make it VFR ok," they then accepted their landing clearance for runway 31L.

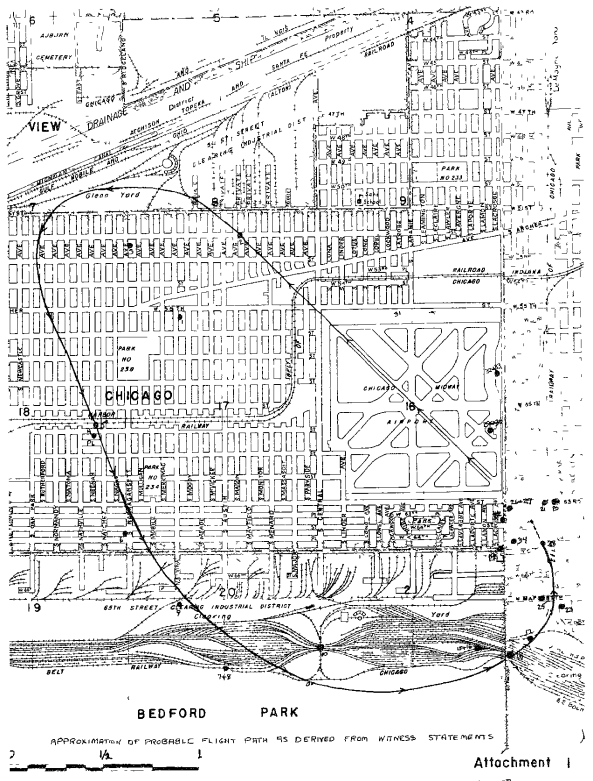
TWA Flight 595 crash site and flight route

The aircraft was below the scattered clouds at 600 feet when it began its turn to final for runway 31L. During the turn the aircraft banked in excess of 45 degrees and began rapidly sinking. The pilots tried to recover the aircraft and initiated a go around procedure, retracting the landing gear and leveling the wings. They also started retracting the flaps, but their efforts were to no avail, the aircraft was wings level in a nose up attitude as it impacted roofs and the tops of trees at 5:35 am CST a quarter mile from the runway. The operator in the tower transmitted "NO... NO!!" which he explained was a spontaneous reaction to seeing flight 595 crash into houses creating a fireball. Flight 595 had been airborne for 3 minutes and 30 seconds. the crash killed all 3 crew members on board as well as fatally injuring 8 people on the ground.

== Aftermath ==
An investigation into the crash was opened by the Civil Aeronautics Board, and the report was released on 12 May 1961. The report revealed that there was no actual fire in engine No. 2. In January 1960 the Lockheed Aircraft Corporation conducted a test, flying another Lockheed Constellation in a similar manner to that of the accident aircraft. Their test concluded that "a loss of several hundred feet was necessary to acquire enough airspeed to recover from this sinking condition." Flight 595 did not have enough altitude to spare as they were flying below the scattered clouds at 600 feet. The Civil Aeronautics Board report also points out that the aircraft lost crucial lift by retracting the flaps after attempting the go-around.

== Aircraft ==
The aircraft was a Lockheed L-1049H Super Constellation with the registration number N-102R. it was a fairly new plane with a manufacture date of 6 June 1957, and the serial number 1252. During its last overhaul on 8 March 1959 it had accumulated a total of 3,432.8 flight hours. it was powered by four Curtiss-Wright 988 Turbo-Compound 18EA-3 engines. At the time of the crash engine No. 1 had 1,298.57 hours since its last overhaul, engine No. 2 had 545.19 hours, engine No. 3 had 153.13 hours, and engine No. 4 had 476.13 hours. The aircraft was loaded to 126,606 pounds, slightly under the maximum allowable takeoff weight of 127,400 pounds.

== Crew ==
The crew of flight 595 consisted of a captain, a first officer, and a flight engineer, all of whom were very experienced. Captain Claude Wilbert Helwig was 40 years old at the time of the crash and had worked for TWA for 14 years. He had 12,467 total flight hours, 1,670 of which were on the Constellation. First Officer Delmas Earl Watters, age 36, had been with TWA for seven years with 6,285 total flight hours, 3,919 of them being on the Constellation. Flight Engineer Aerion Lyman Auge Jr. worked for TWA for 6 years and had 5,100 hours flying in the Constellation as a Flight Engineer.
