= Operation Safe Haven (1957) =

Refugee relief and resettlement operation from Hungary

Operation Safe Haven, also known as Operation Mercy, was a refugee relief and resettlement operation executed by the United States following the Soviet suppression of the Hungarian Revolution of 1956.

The airlift was ordered by President Dwight D. Eisenhower on December 10, 1956. Headed by task force commander General George B. Dany, it successfully evacuated over 27,000 Hungarian refugees to the United States over a period of 90 days, with an additional 11,000 being settled, also in the US, in the following year. Operation Safe Haven was the most significant European humanitarian airlift since the Berlin Airlift.

Lifting the refugees began almost simultaneously to an appeal by Elvis Presley at the close of his last appearance on the Ed Sullivan Show. Presley's broadcast live to an audience of 54.6 million on January 6, 1957 eventually covered a quarter of a million refugees and their settlement in Austria and the United Kingdom.

== Airlift and sealift ==
The airlift was a joint endeavor by the United States Bolling and Military Air Transport Services, the United States Navy, and various commercial aircraft. General George B. Dany, commander of the 1611th Air Transport Wing at McGuire Air Force Base, N.J., was named Airlift Task Force commander. From January 1, 1957, air transports from the 1608th Air Transport Wing from Charleston Air Force Base, S.C., and 175 aircraft from the 1611th Air Transport Wing from McGuire Air Force Base, N.J., relocated 9,700 refugees to the United States. In addition to air transport, from December 18, 1956, through February 14, 1957, USNS General LeRoy Eltinge (T-AP-154), USNS General W. G. Haan, USNS Marine Carp, and USNS General Nelson M. Walker (T-AP-125), all Navy Military Sea Transportation Service personnel transports, carried 8,944 refugees from Bremerhaven, Germany, to Camp Kilmer, NJ, US. These refugees were job-classified by the U.S. Labor Department as they made their way to American shores. In total, some 38,000 refugees were permanently resettled in the United States.

== Concurrent charitable appeal by Elvis Presley and its legacy ==
On Sunday 28 October 1956, some 56.5 million television viewers in the US were watching the popular Ed Sullivan Show, on which Elvis Presley (1935–1977) was headlining for the second time. Earlier, in the day, at 2.30 in the afternoon, he received Dr. Jonas Salk's polio vaccine in front of the world's media. During the actual broadcast, Ed Sullivan made a casual mention of the need to send aid to the Hungarian refugees, but no appeal was formally made. This led to Presley's official request, for his third and last appearance on the show, for Mr. Sullivan, this time on his personal behalf, to ask viewers to send contributions. On 6 January 1957 an estimated 54.6 million viewers watched this episode. In it, Presley made another request for donations and as suggested by Ed Sullivan, dedicated a song which, in his opinion, fit the mood properly as the episode's finale: the African American gospel song "Peace in the Valley". By the end of 1957, some US$6 million were received by the Geneva-based International Red Cross, and which translated into food rations, clothing, and other essentials. These in turn were distributed with the help of the US Air Force, which flew 100 sorties to deliver these supplies to the estimated 250,000 refugees, the majority of whom settled, for life, in Austria and England. One of the transport planes was the same which delivered him and another 40 soldiers back to the United States, on March 3, 1960 after his 16 months in Germany. The plane is now at the Air Force Museum.

On 1 March 2011, Budapest mayor István Tarlós announced that the city would posthumously make Presley an honorary citizen, as well as name a small park facing the Margaret Bridge (its second oldest crossing) after him. These honors were designed as a gesture of gratitude for his involvement in lessening the plight of the above mentioned quarter million refugees not covered by Operation Safe Haven. As a result, he is the only US-born person to be included in the list of personalities who were named as Honorary Citizens of Budapest, joining the Hungarian born (later US-nationalized) physicist and father of the hydrogen bomb Edward Teller, as well as other eminent personalities including Czech activist and president Václav Havel, Polish dissident, President and Nobel Peace Prize laureate Lech Wałęsa, Swedish diplomat and martyr Raoul Wallenberg, Hungarian chess grandmaster Judit Polgár and inventor Ernő Rubik.
