= 1910s in air cargo =

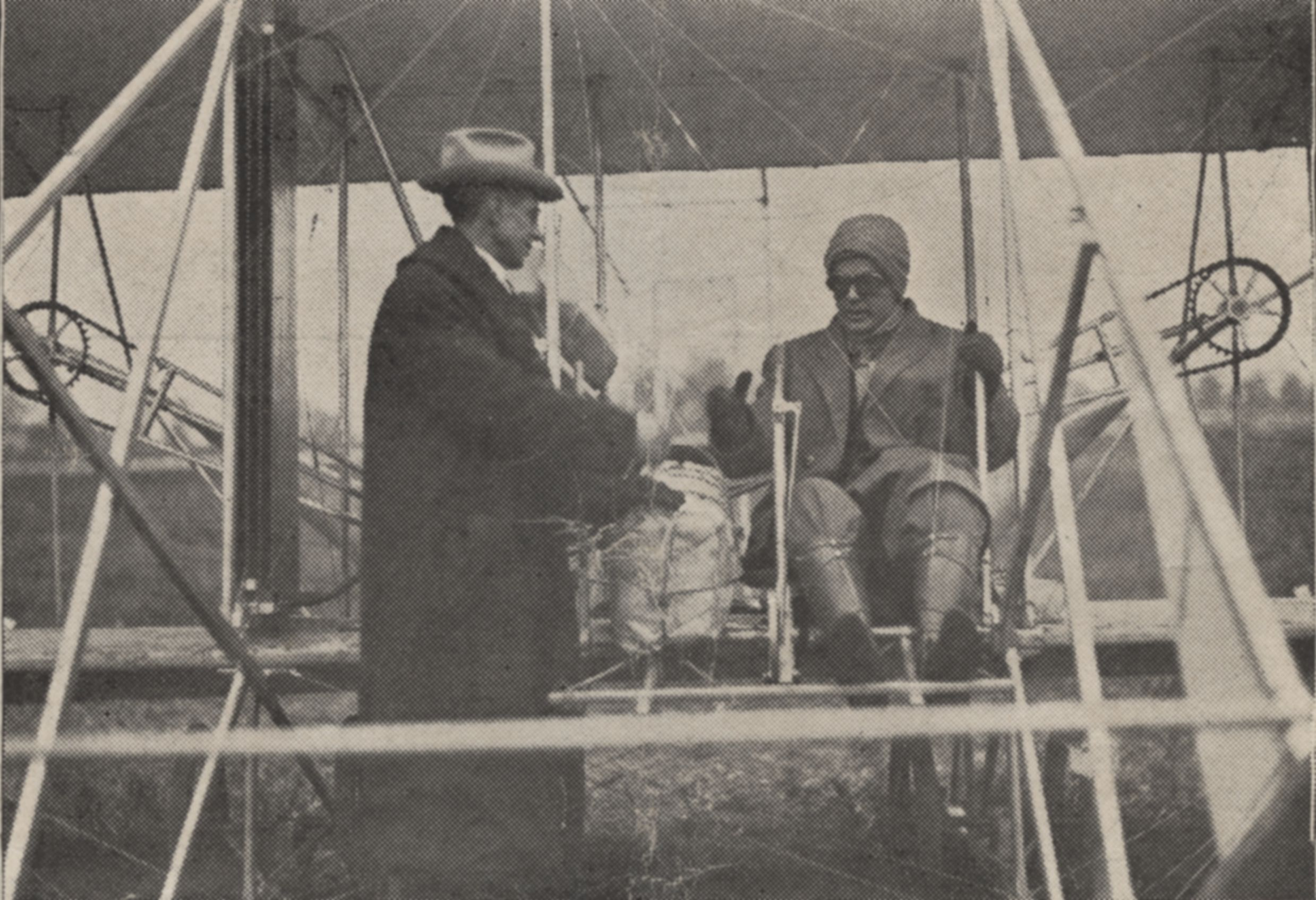
World's first air cargo freight flight arriving at Columbus, Ohio, United States, on November 7, 1910

This is a list of air cargo, airmail and airlift related events as well as a summary from the decade 1910–1919.

== Overview ==
=== Civil developments ===
Seven years after the Wright Flyer made the first sustained flight by a manned heavier-than-air powered and controlled aircraft on December 17, 1903, the modern history of airmail and air cargo took off, and the decade 1910-1919 saw a lot of 'firsts', a.o.:

- The world's first commercial air cargo flight (1910).
- The world's first successful airmail delivery by an airplane (1911).
- The world's first airplane charter flight (1911).
- The world's first official airmail stamp (1917)

For the United States, the period from 1910 to 1918 (until the first scheduled U.S. airmail services) is often classified as the ‘pioneer’ period of experimental and exhibition airmail flights in the form of air meets, demonstration flights. By 1916 the era of scattered pioneer flights was winding down, resulting in official congress fundings to establish experimental airmail services.

Across Europe and much of the rest of the world, the same period 1910–1918 represents a pioneering era broadly comparable to the U.S., characterized by exhibition and experimental flights, and specifically in Europe also by wartime technological advances - although regional timing, infrastructure and the shift to scheduled services varied considerably per country. Many regions outside Europe and the U.S. still lacked the industrial base for regular routes until after WWI or into the 1920s.

=== Military developments ===
Be it mainly for Europe and the United States, World War I (1914–1918) can be seen as an accelerator for aviation, air cargo and logistics. The war provided a major operational and technological push: for the first time aircraft were developed, produced and widely used for reconnaissance and bombing. In a later stage the aircraft were also used for the first military supply drops and the first larger aerial supply mission took place at the end of the war. The new developed airframes and the experience gained were adapted again for civil cargo/airmail soon after the war, when resources like aircraft and pilots became available for civil service.

In Africa, the Middle East, Asia or the Pacific, although impacted by the war, there were no notable, established military air transport or freight developments before 1918 comparable to the European and North American efforts.

== Events ==
=== 1910 ===
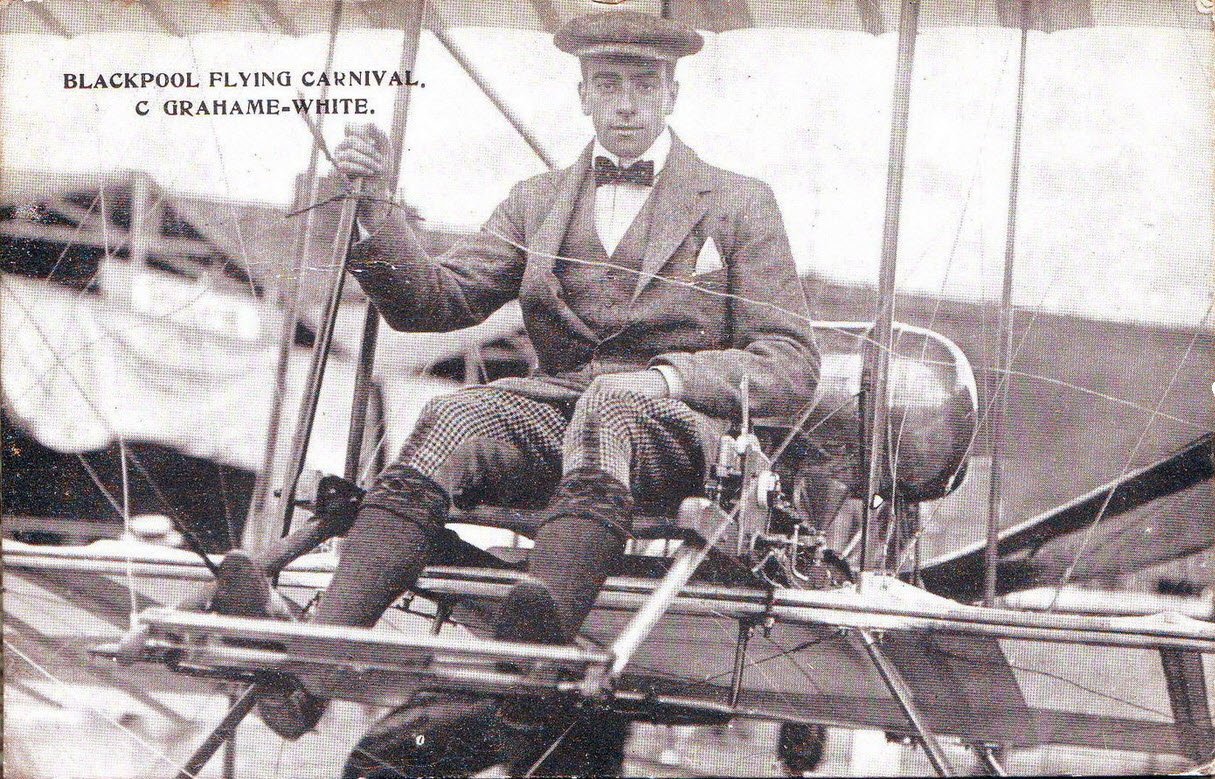
Claude Grahame-White postcard

- August 10 – (United Kingdom) Early (unsuccessful) airmail attempt during the Blackpool Air Show by Claude Grahame White who departed from Blackpool in a Farman Biplane to carry several pieces of private post to Southport, but was forced to land because of technical issues.
- November 7 – (United States) The world's first commercial air cargo flight occurs between Dayton, Ohio, and Columbus, Ohio, by the Wright Brothers and department store owner Max Moorehouse. The trip is made by Wright pilot Philip Parmalee in a Wright Model B airplane, carrying a consignment of 200 pounds (about 88 kilograms) consisting of two parcels of silk.

=== 1911 ===
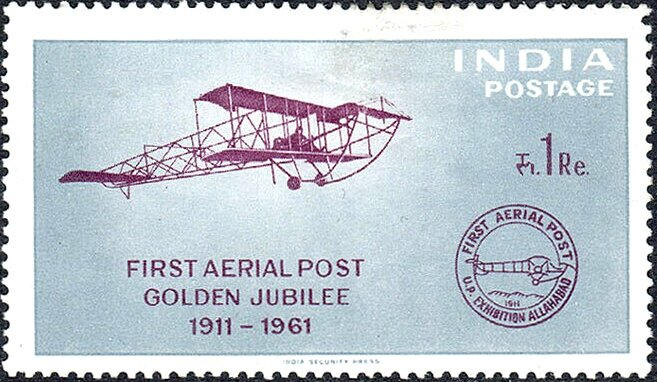
Stamp of India - 1961 - Pecquet Flying Humber Sommer in 1911

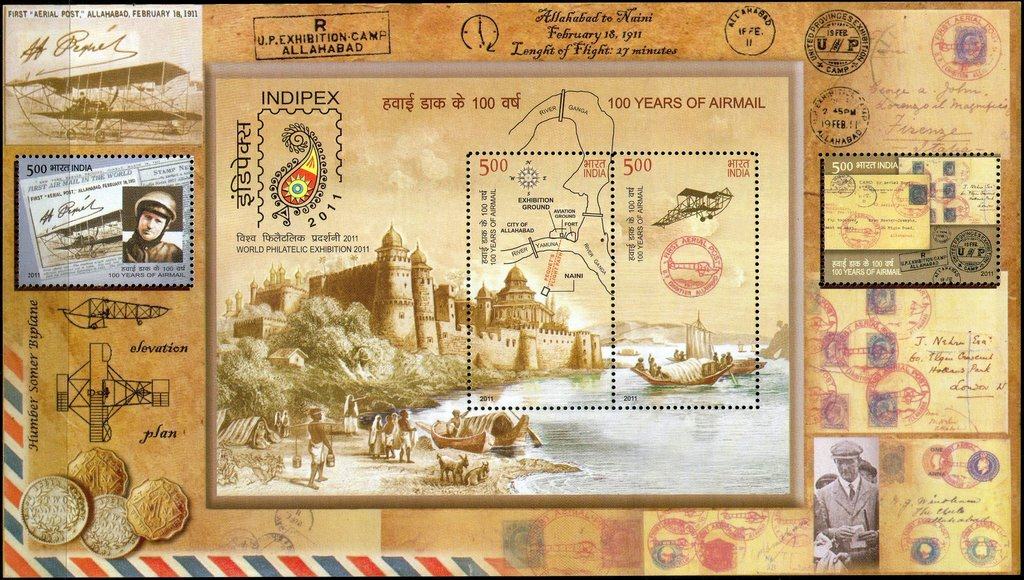
Stamp of India - 2011 - Centenary of World s First Airmail Flight in 1911

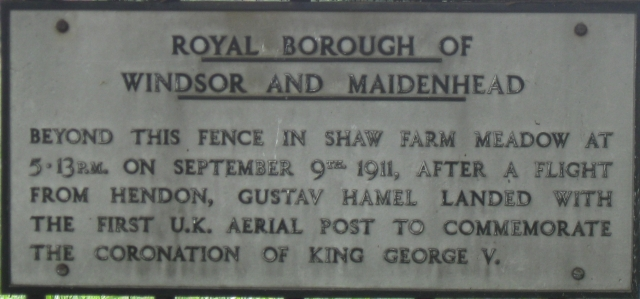
Commemorative plate for 1st UK Air Mail in 1911

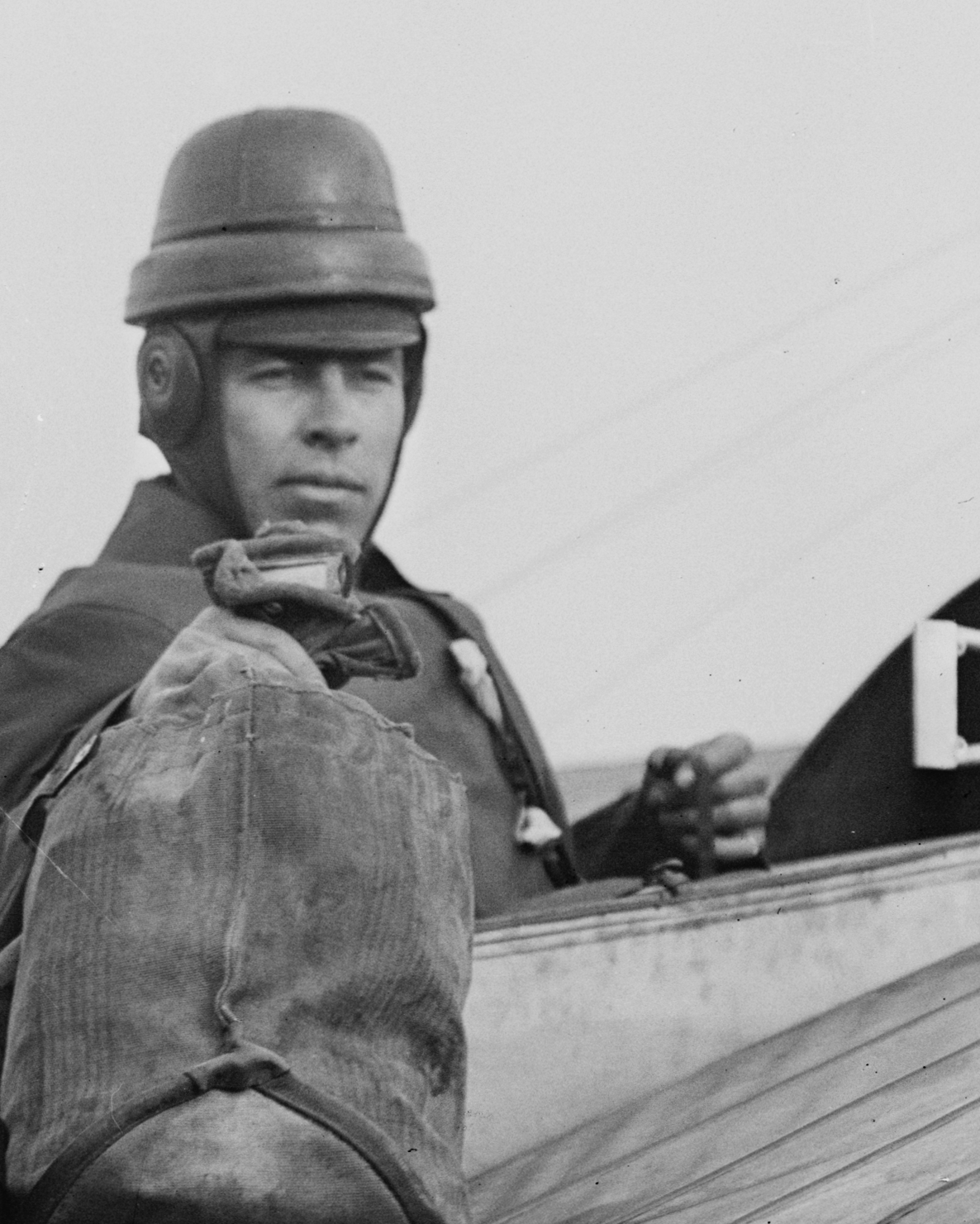
Earle Lewis Ovington with airmail mailpouch on September 26, 1911, from- Postmaster Morgan, P.M.G. Hitchcock, & Ovington

- Undated – (United States) Postmasters across the U.S. engaged pilots to carry airmail at fairs and meets for publicity.
- February 17-18 – (United States) Fred Wiseman carried first unofficial U.S. mail (3 letters and newspapers) in a Wiseman-Cooke airplane from Petaluma to Santa Rosa, California (14 mi). The flight took two days to complete, and the last part had to be done by car.
- February 18 – (India) The world's first successful airmail delivery by an airplane occurs when Henri Pequet carries approximately 6,500 letters over 10 km (5 mi) across the Jumna River, from Allahabad to Naini Junction in a Humber biplane during the United Provinces Exhibition in India.
- April 12 – (France-United Kingdom) Pierre Prier, chief pilot of the Blériot school in London, made the first flight from Paris (Issy-les-Moulineaux) to London (Hendon). This was the first non-stop air service between London and Paris. Prier flew a Blériot monoplane with a 50-horsepower Gnome engine, and made the trip in three hours and fifty six minutes.
- April-October – (France-United Kingdom) After the April 12 flight by Pierre Prier, Compagnie Générale Transaérienne (CGT) began weekly return flights between London and Paris from April to October each year carrying mail and small items such as catalogs and pieces of machinery.
- June 28 – (United States) An English aviator, Thomas Sopwith, makes the world's first airplane charter flight, when hired by the Wanamaker's department store to deliver a package containing a pair of telegram ordered spectacles for passenger Washington Atlee Burpee on board of the RMS Olympic which was leaving New York City on her eastbound maiden voyage. The package narrowly missed the deck, and fell into the Hudson River.
- July 4 – (United Kingdom) Commercial cargo is flown by Horatio Barber in his Valkyrie B tail-first monoplane. The General Electric company pays £100 to have a box of Osram electric lamps flown from Shoreham-by-Sea to Hove.
- August 28-29 – (France - England) Marc Pourpe flies a cross-Channel flight from Boulogne, France to Folkstone, England (carrying two letters) and a return flight at the widest point between the two countries in a Blériot monoplane.
- September 2 – (Denmark) Robert Svendsen carries 150 postcards flying a Henri Farman plane from Middelfart to Fredericia on the Jutland peninsula.
- September 9 – (United Kingdom) The first British scheduled airmail flight is made when Gustav Hamel flies in a Bleriot XI from Hendon to Windsor as part of the coronation of King George V.
- September 13 – (France) The first French airmail system tests took place in its Moroccan colonial cities of Casablanca and Fez. These cities had large seaports, so the French used a Breguet biplane nicknamed “the flying tent” that was fitted with floats (pontoons) for taking off from and landing on the water.
- September 19 – (Italy) The first airmail service in Italy starts between Bologna, Venice and Rimini. Pilot Achille Dal Mistro flew a Deperdussin monoplane about 90 miles (145 kilometers) from Bologna to Venice in 88 minutes. Dal Mistro crash-landed on the Lido (the beach) near Venice but was not hurt.
- September 23 – (United States) The first official airmail of the United States by an airplane is flown when Earle Ovington flies 6 miles (9.7 km) from Nassau Boulevard to Mineola on Long Island in a Queen Aeroplane Company monoplane.
- December 27 – (South Africa) First authorized mail flight in South Africa. Aviator Evelyn (“Bok”) Driver conducted an authorized mail flight in coordination with the South African Minister of Posts and Telegraphs, carrying 729 specially issued postcards from the Kenilworth racecourse to Muizenberg, a distance of approximately 13 km. During the return flight that evening, additional mail was transported. The outbound journey lasted about 7 minutes and 30 seconds.

=== 1912 ===
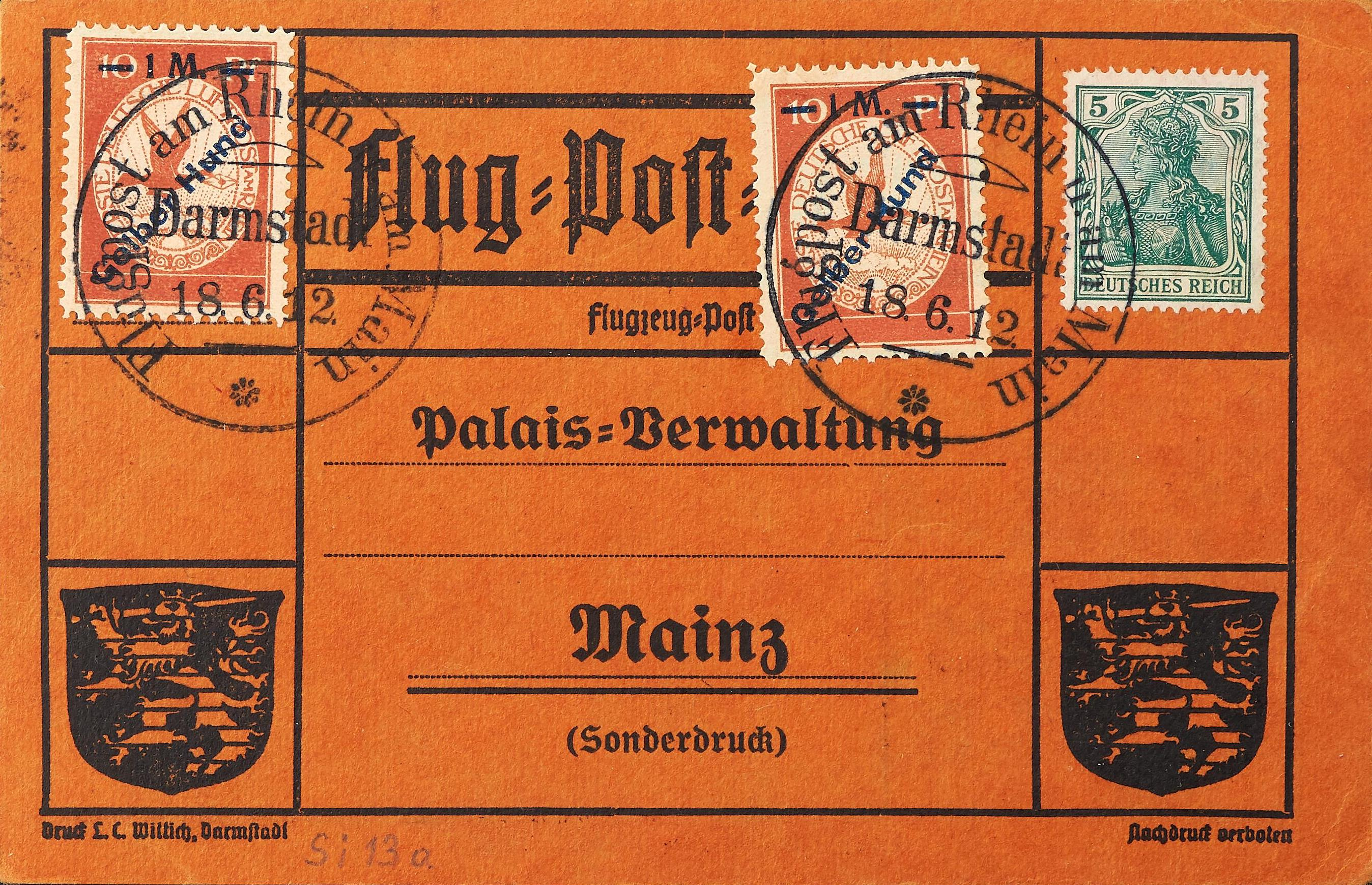
Rhine and Main June 1912 airmail flight postcard

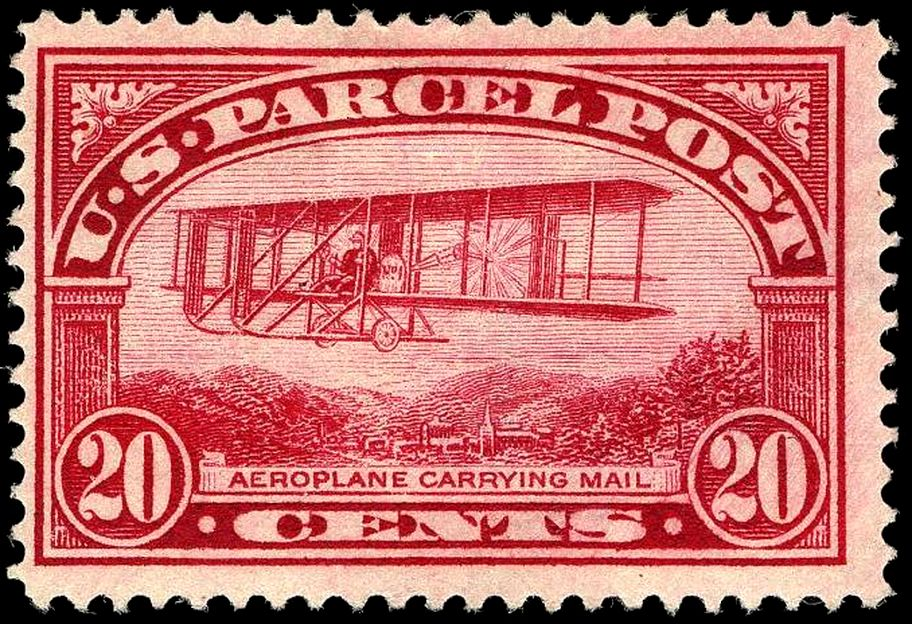
Parcel Post Aeroplane mail 20c 1913 issue

- May 19 – (Germany) First official mail flight in German postal service – the Deutschen Reichspost (German Postal Service) inaugurated airmail between Mannheim and Heidelberg.
- June 1 – (Sweden) (Danish) pilot Peter Nielson flew a B-S monoplane carrying airmail from Eslöv to Marieholm.
- June 9-23 – (Germany) Germany's first major airmail event “Flugpost am Rhein und am Main” saw mail carried by both the Zeppelins Schwaben and Euler's airplane Gelber Hund. June 10, August Euler's 100-horsepower (75-kilowatt) Otto biplane “Gelber Hund” flew 27 km with 40 kg of mail from Frankfurt-Niederrad to Darmstadt, continuing to Worms with 79 kg.
- July 31 – (France) First official airmail transport in France by Lieutenant Nicaud of the French Army flying a Farman biplane, carrying three mailbags containing 10,000 postal items (postmarked in Nancy on 28 July 1912). The aircraft departed Nancy at 07:16 and arrived in Lunéville at 07:33, completing the 27-kilometre flight in 17 minutes.
- August 3-5 – (United States) U.S. novelty airmail in South Jersey – 1912, Pilot Marshall Reid flew beach-to-beach promotional "souvenir" mail flights between Ocean City and Stone Harbor. The first authorized run carried mail in 29 minutes; total of ~12,615 mail pieces flown.
- August 10 – First U.S. interstate official airmail (Pacific Northwest) - upon being granted temporary route #673001 by the United States Post Office Department, Walter Edward Kittel, also known as Walter Edwards, flew the first officially sanctioned airmail flight in the Pacific Northwest when he flew mail from Waverly Golf Links in Oregon to his home base at the Vancouver Barracks in Vancouver, Washington.
- December 5 – (United States) First U.S. postage stamp, the world's first stamp featuring an airplane. The 20¢ Parcel Post stamp featured an airplane carrying mail.

=== 1913 ===
- Undated – (Belgium) Pilot Henri Crombez flying a Deperdussin monoplane carried an unknown number of commemorative postcards from Sint-Denijs-Westrem to Ghent for the Ghent International and Universal Exposition, which ran for six months from April 25 to November 3, 1913.
- January 13 – (United States)) First regular air cargo service in the U.S. - Harry M. Jones flew baked beans from Boston to New York in a Wright Model B.
- March 9 1913, – (Switzerland) First airmail transport in Switzerland Swiss by aviator Oscar Bieder on the route between Basel and Liestal. Officially sanctioned Swiss airmail services, however, were not inaugurated until April 1919.
- October 15 – (France) First experimental longer-range airmail service in France by Lieutenant Ronin carrying a 22 lb sack of letters by Morane-Saulnier from Villacoublay to Pauillac. This event is often cited as the birth of operational French airmail because it connected the Paris region to a major seaport for onward transoceanic mail.

=== 1914 ===
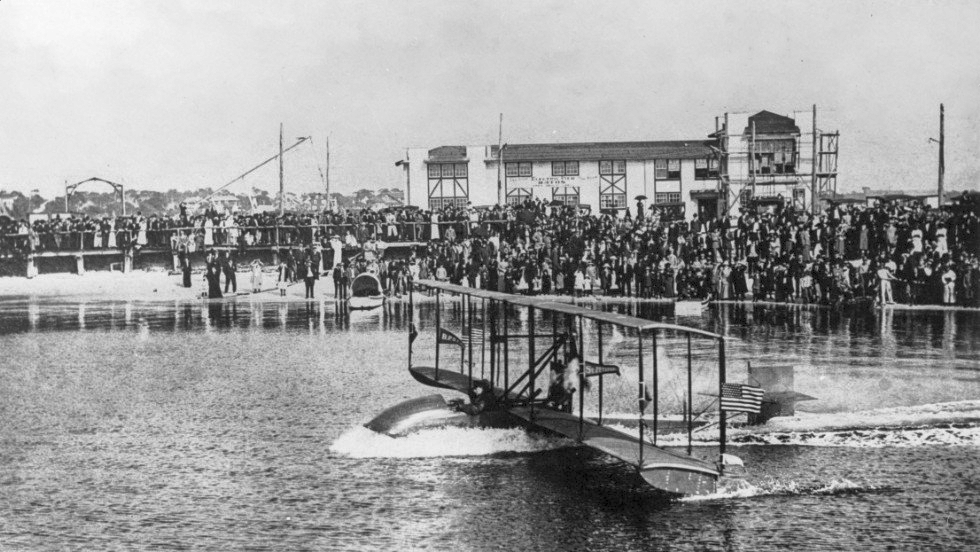
Benoist Type XIV first airline takeoff - January 1, 1914

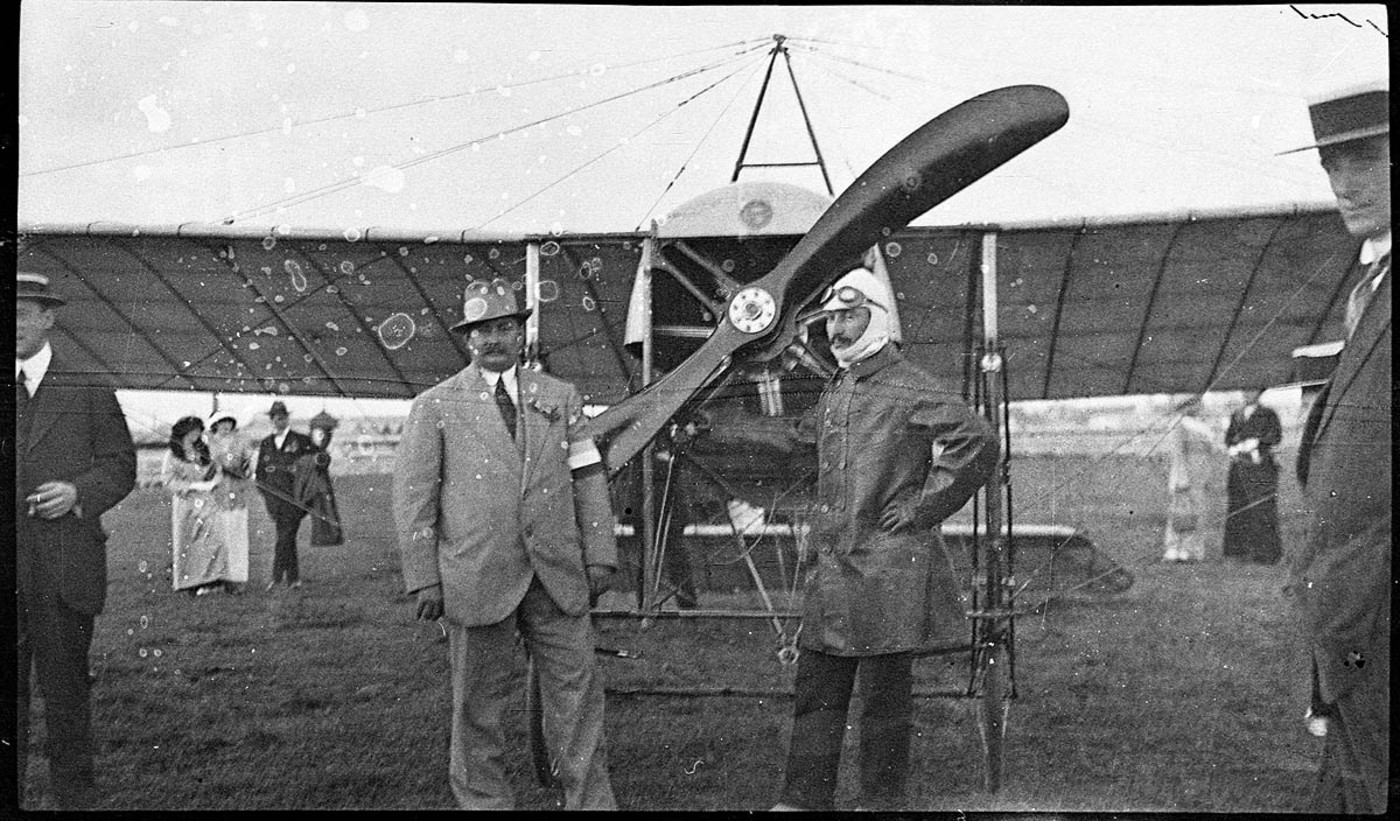
Maurice Guillaux and his Bleriot XI monoplane after the first mail and cargo flight Melbourne-Sydney - July 18, 1914

- January 1 – (United States) Beginning of the world's first regularly scheduled heavier-than-air airline: the St. Petersburg to Tampa Airboat Line for passengers and express, flying a Benoist XIV. Although the aircraft used on the route were capable of carrying both passengers and freight, sources are unclear whether mail or freight were actually on board of this flight. In the weeks that followed though, mail and freight was carried on the route.
- July 16-18 – (Australia) Australia's first airmail and air cargo was carried by French aviator Maurice Guillaux on a Melbourne to Sydney flight, carrying 1,785 postcards plus small freight (notably a packet of tea and a cordial bottle). At the time this was the longest airmail/air freight hop anywhere; it demonstrated civilian demand for mail and light cargo by air and generated strong public & commercial interest.

=== 1915 ===
- Undated – (United Kingdom) First regular airmail carriage in Europe - From 1915 British military aviators routinely carried army mail, messages and dispatches across the Channel to the continent.
- November – (France / Serbia-Greece) The first medevac airlift operation in air history took place when the French squadron MF 99 S, equipped with Farman MF.11, flew wounded soldiers from Serbia through Albania to Corfu.

=== 1916 ===
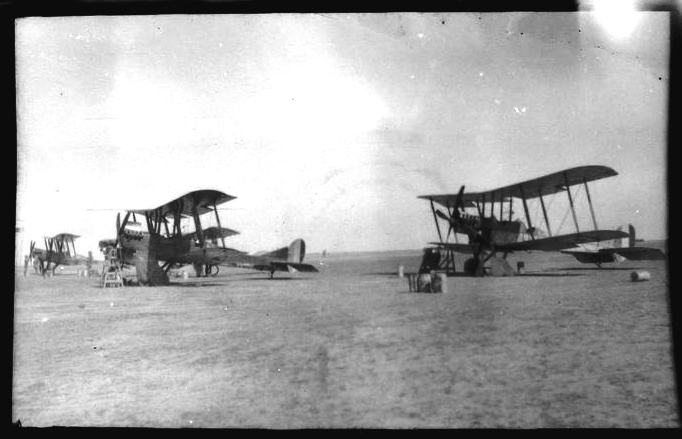
three British Royal Flying Corps military aeroplanes of BE2 type landed in a desert field north of Baghdad

- March 27 – (United Kingdom) The world's first large-scale military air-supply attempt during the siege of Kut, Mesopotamia. British Royal Flying Corps (No. 30 Squadron and others) attempted systematic delivery/airdrops of food, medicine and materiel into the besieged garrison at Kut-al-Amara (present-day Iraq). Pilots flew low over the town and attempted to release supplies; this is commonly cited as the first recorded modern attempt at aerial resupply/airdrop in a military siege, the direct ancestor of later organized airlift and airdrop operations.

=== 1917 ===
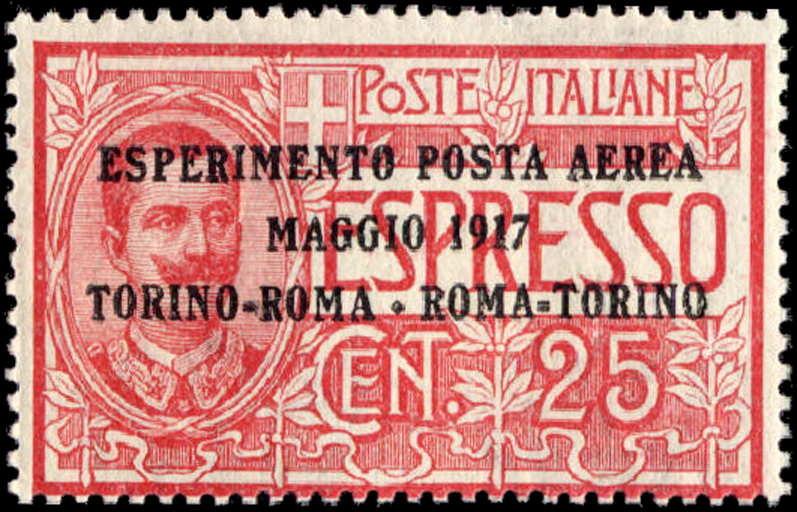
World's first official airmail stamp, Italy, 1917

- May – (Italy) The world's first official airmail stamp - Italy overprinted stamps and ran experimental Turin–Rome flights (often described as the first official airmail stamp experiment).
- July 6 – (Mexico) Horacio Ruiz Gaviño flying a Curtiss Jenny JN-4 carried 800 letters and postcards from Pachuca to Mexico City.
- September 2 – (Argentina) The world's first official international airmail flight takes place in the Río de la Plata region. Argentine pilot Pablo (Teodoro) Fels made an experimental official international airmail flight from Buenos Aires, Argentina to Montevideo, Uruguay, carrying one sack of mail with 90 letters and postcards.

=== 1918 ===
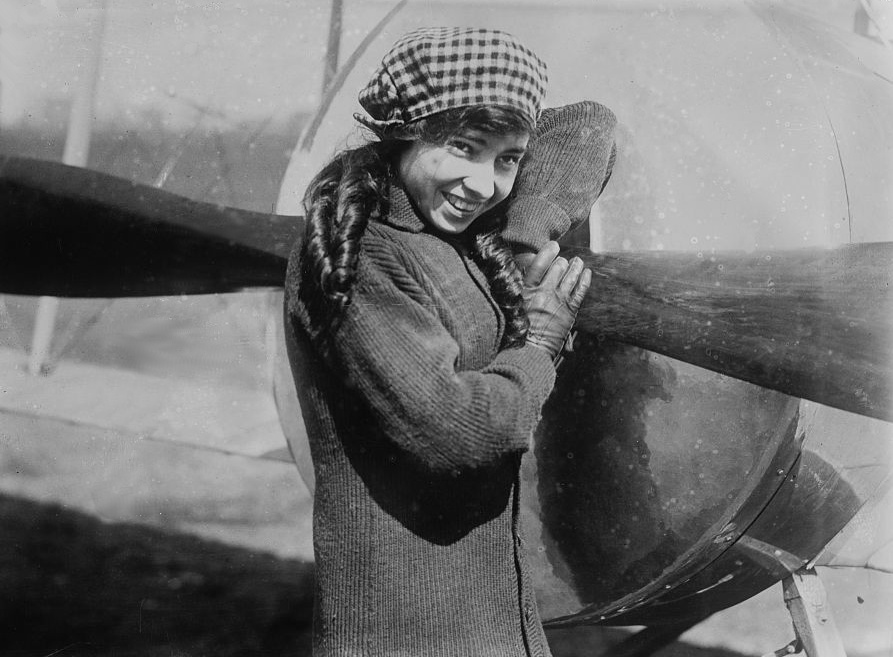
Katherine Stinson and her purpose-built aerobatic aeroplane

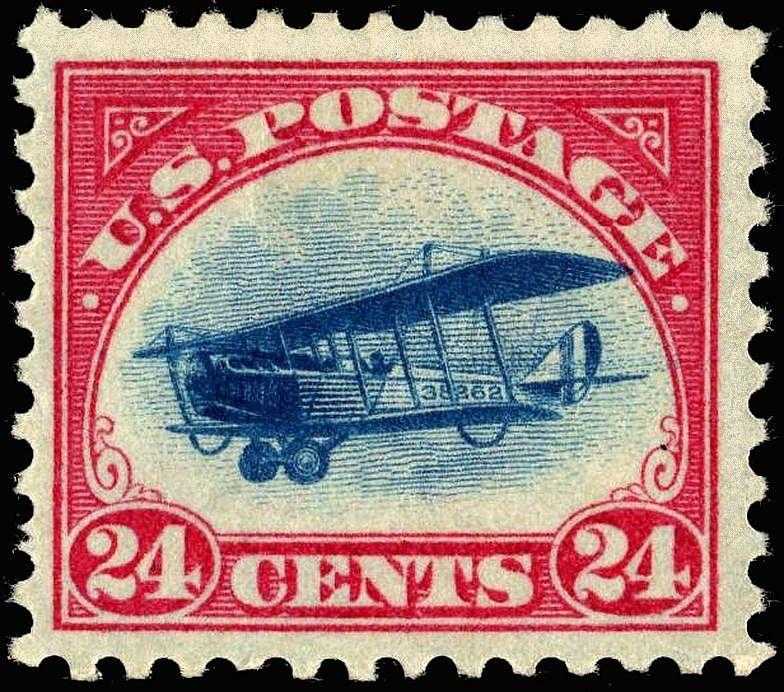
US stamp 1918 24c Curtiss Jenny -C3

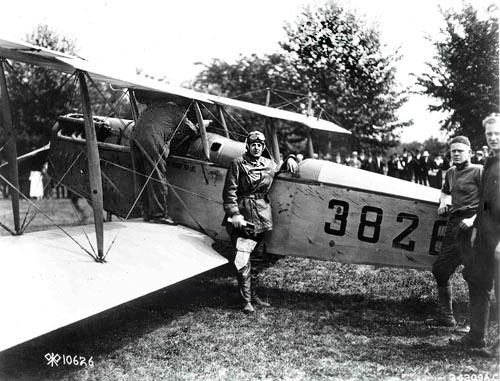
First airmail service 1918

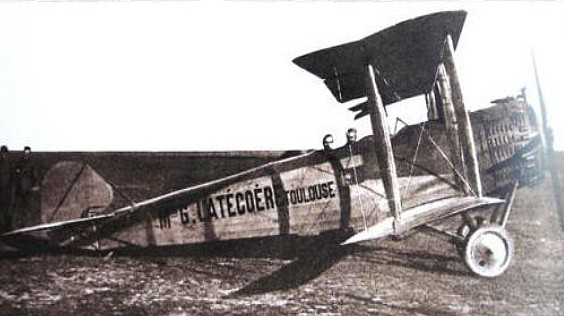
Lignes Aeriennes Latécoére (Latécoére-Toulouse)

- Undated – (Canada) First airmail flight in western Canada by Katherine Stinson carrying a mailbag containing 259 letters from Calgary to Edmonton flying a Curtiss-Stinson Special.
- Undated – (United Kingdom - Europe) First regular overseas airmail North Europe - In 1918, the Royal Air Force (RAF) and the British Forces Post Office (BFPO) organised an experimental overseas airmail service between Folkestone and Cologne. Around the same time, the Royal Air Force also operated a mail and passenger service for delegates from London to the Paris Peace Conference, which ended in August 1919.
- Undated – (Europe) Experiments and short international military postal link projects in the Allied zone late 1918. During 1918 the RAF (RAF) / British Forces Post Office (BFPO) experimented with overseas airmail flights (precursors to the organized troop mail services that followed in 1919); militaries were already using aircraft to move urgent mail and papers to forward areas.
- March 11 – (Austria–Ukraine) A regular international airmail service begins, with Hansa-Brandenburg C.I aircraft linking Vienna, Lviv, Proskurov, and Kyiv.
- May 13 – (United States) The U.S. issues its first air mail stamps to the public. They bear a picture depicting a Curtiss JN-4H "Jenny". One sheet comprises the "Inverted Jenny" error.
- May 15 –
  - (United States) Postmaster General of the United States Albert S. Burleson assigns Second Assistant Postmaster General Otto Praeger additional duty as the first chief of the U.S. Airmail Service, telling Praeger, "The airmail once started must not stop, but must be constantly improved and expanded until it would become, like the steamship and the railroad, a permanent transportation feature of the postal service."
  - (United States) The first regular United States air mail service commences, between Washington, D.C., Philadelphia and New York City. The first flight is made by Lieutenant Geoffrey Boyle in a modified Curtiss JN-4H "Jenny".
- June 24 – (Canada) The first scheduled Canadian airmail and air freight flight is made, between Montreal and Leaside Toronto by RAF Captain Brian Peck and Corporal C. W. Mathers delivering a bag of mail and a crate of Old Mull scotch.
- July 4 – October – (United Kingdom / France) The Royal Air Force and French/British units regularly drop small amounts of ammunition & rations (e.g., Hamel, Argonne) to forward troops.
- August 17 – (France) First French regular postal air service on the Paris–Le Mans–Saint-Nazaire route. Operated from Le Bourget using Letord aircraft, the service made 158 flights through August 1919. Each airmail journey saved more than five hours compared with rail transport and introduced the first French postal marking indicating carriage “by air.”
- September 7 – (United States) The world's first recorded demonstration of troop transport by air and the start of U.S. mobility airlift took place when several aircraft transported 18 soldiers roughly 16 miles from Chanute Field to Champaign, Illinois.
- October 1-4 – (Belgium) The world's first successful aerial supply mission by RAF No. 82 and No. 218 Squadrons dropping ~1,220 sand-bags plus 60 boxes of ammunition in Belgium/Flanders.
- October 3-8 – (France) After several failed attempts a successful aerial supply mission by the U.S. 50th Aero Squadron using DH-4s to save nine companies of the US Army’s 77th Division that became surrounded by German forces in the Forest of Argonne and were running low on supplies and food, and became known as the Lost Battalion.
- December 12 – (United Kingdom–Egypt–India) Captain R. M. Smith, Brigadier General A. E. Borton, and Major General W. Salmond set out in a Handley Page O/400 from Heliopolis to Karachi, to survey a route for airmail to India.
- December 25 – (France–Spain) The world's first civilian international airmail service: Pierre-Georges Latécoère’s Lignes Aériennes Latécoère (later Aéropostale) inaugurated a Toulouse–Barcelona mail flight, commonly cited as the first civilian international airmail airline operation (and the seed of long-distance postal airlines).

=== 1919 ===
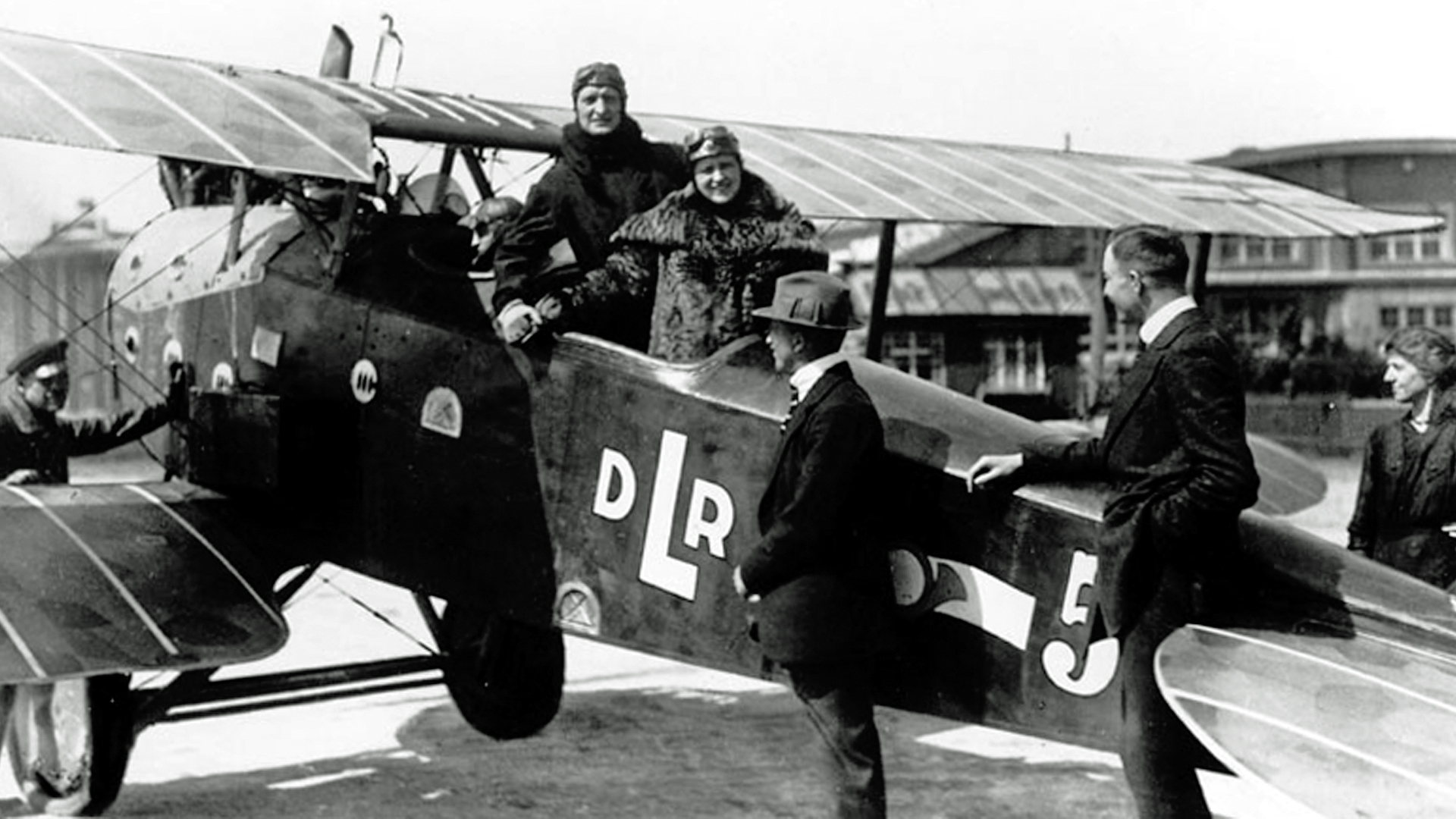
DLR LVG CVI Hans Albers

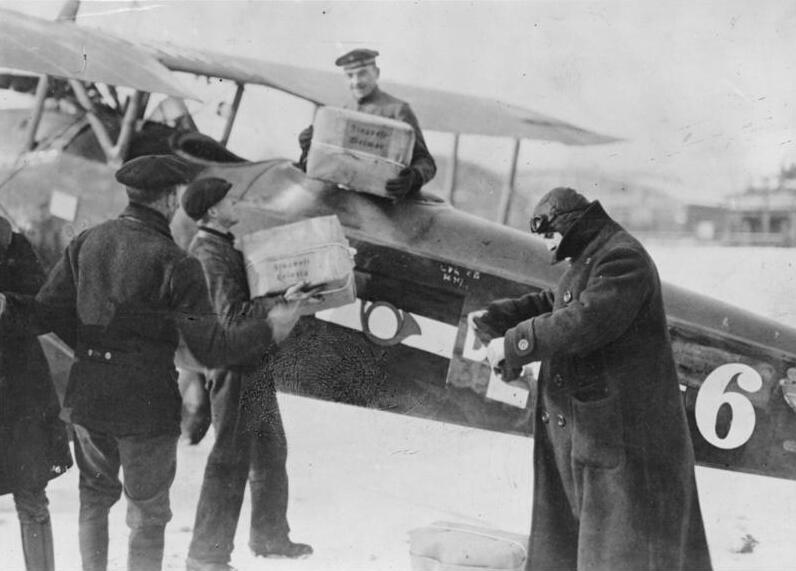
Berlin, Airmail to Weimar

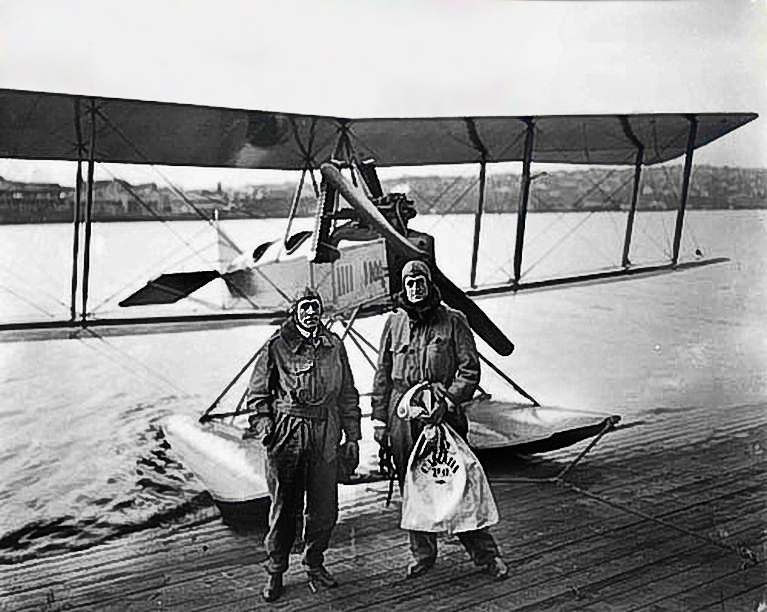
First international Airmail flight, 1919

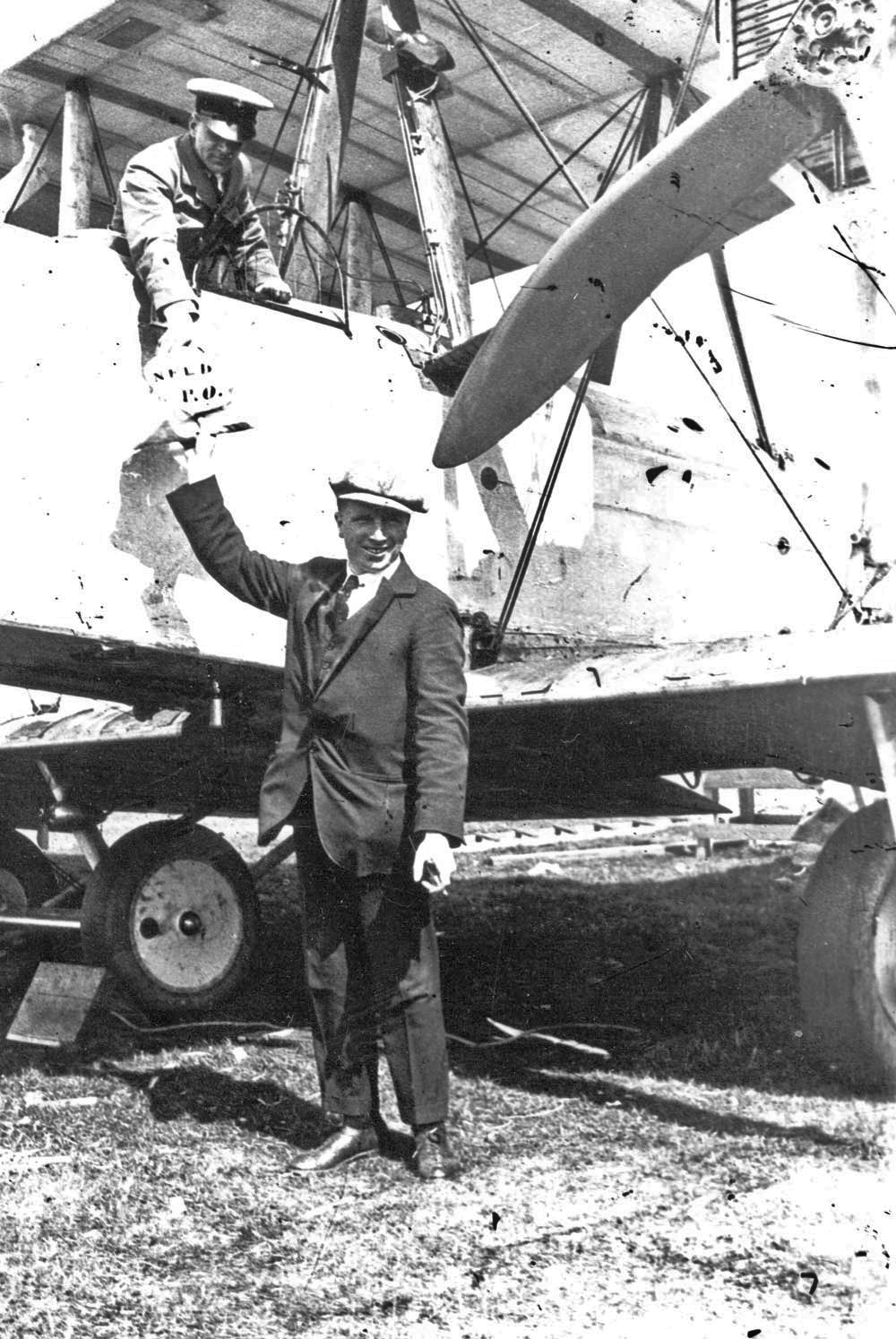
Alcock and Brown mail

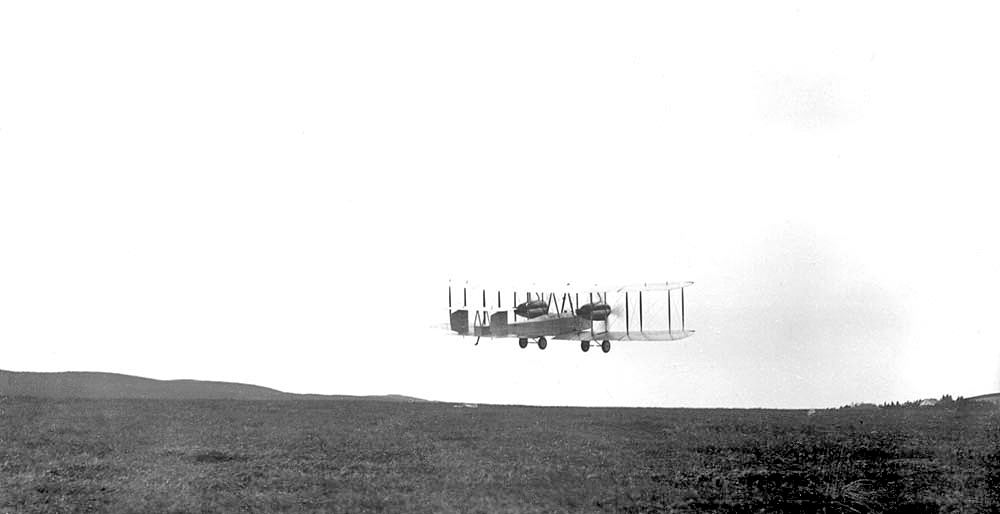
Alcock and Brown takeoff, 1919

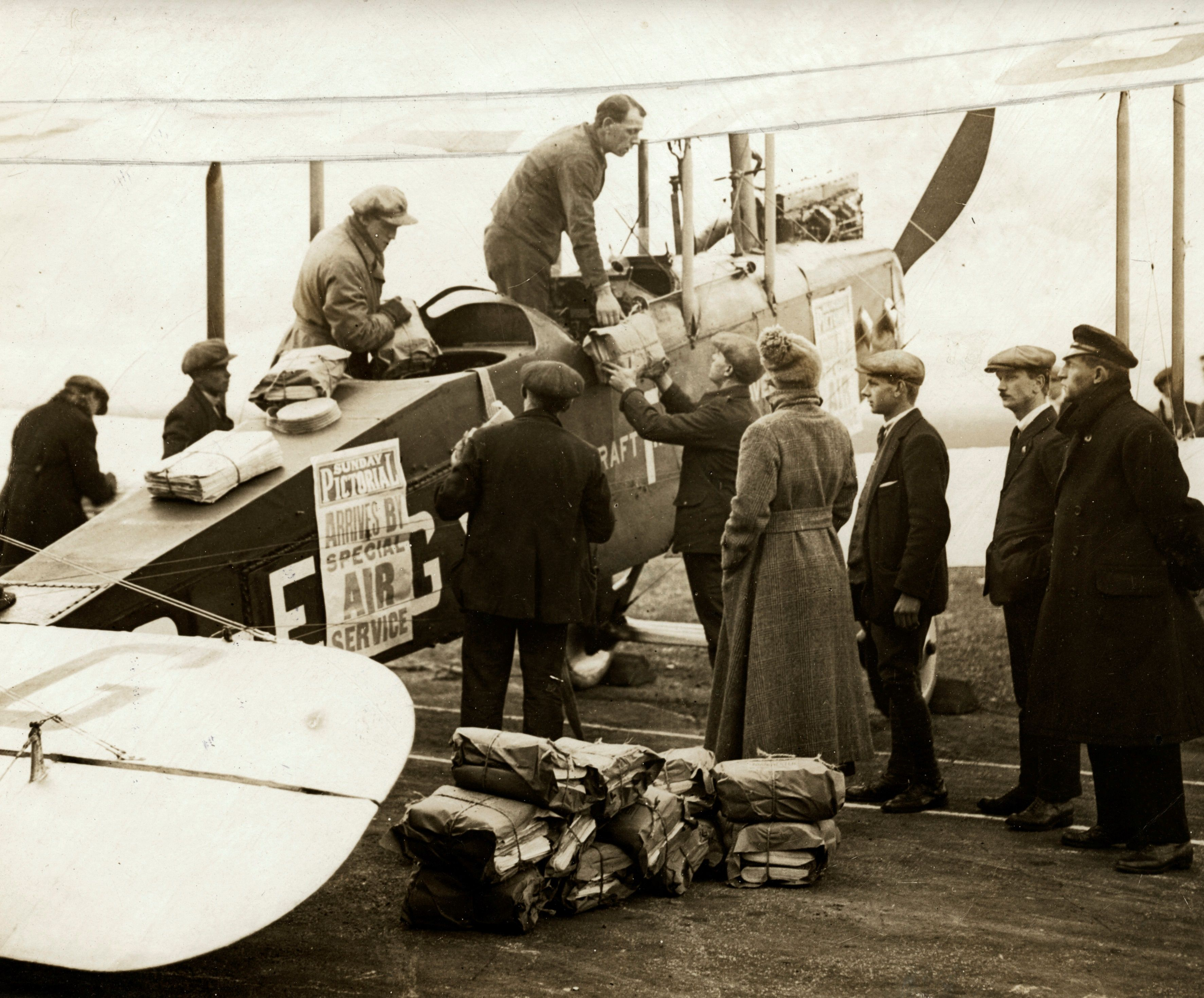
Railway strike, 1919

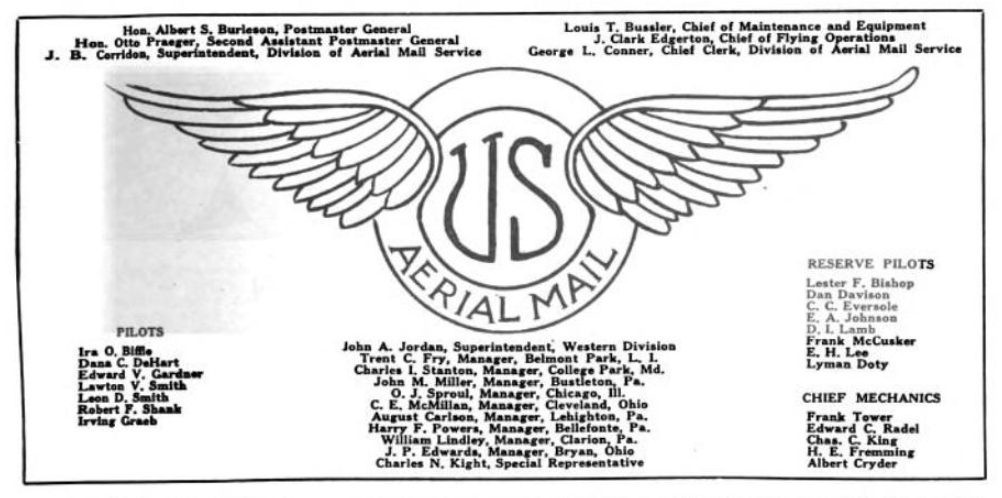
US Aerial Mail advertisement in Aerial Age (1919) Volume 9

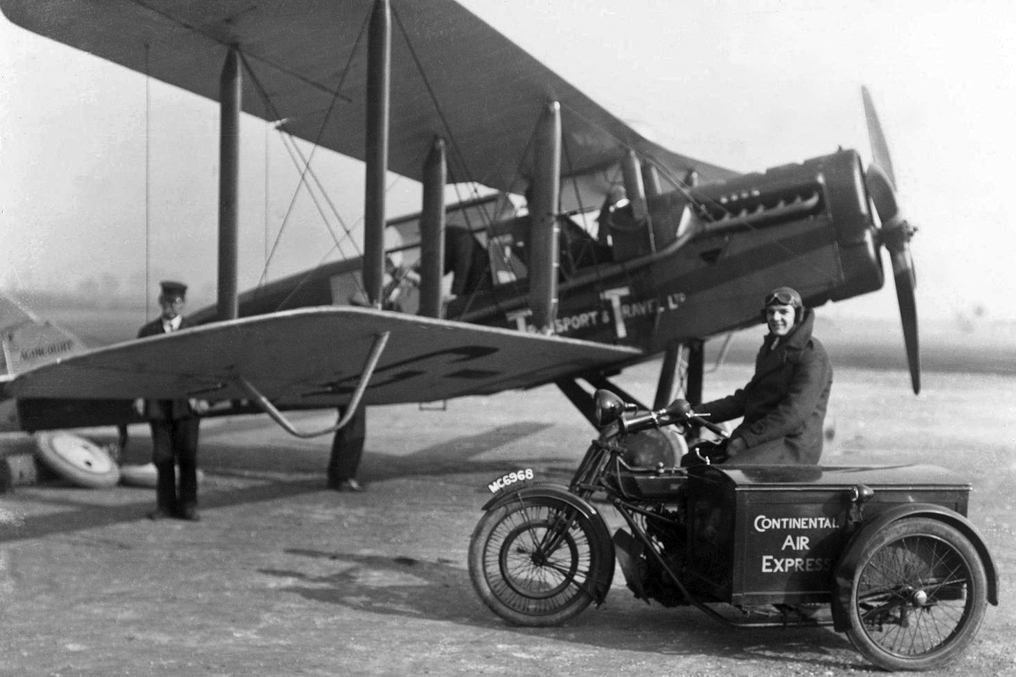
DH16 - AT&T

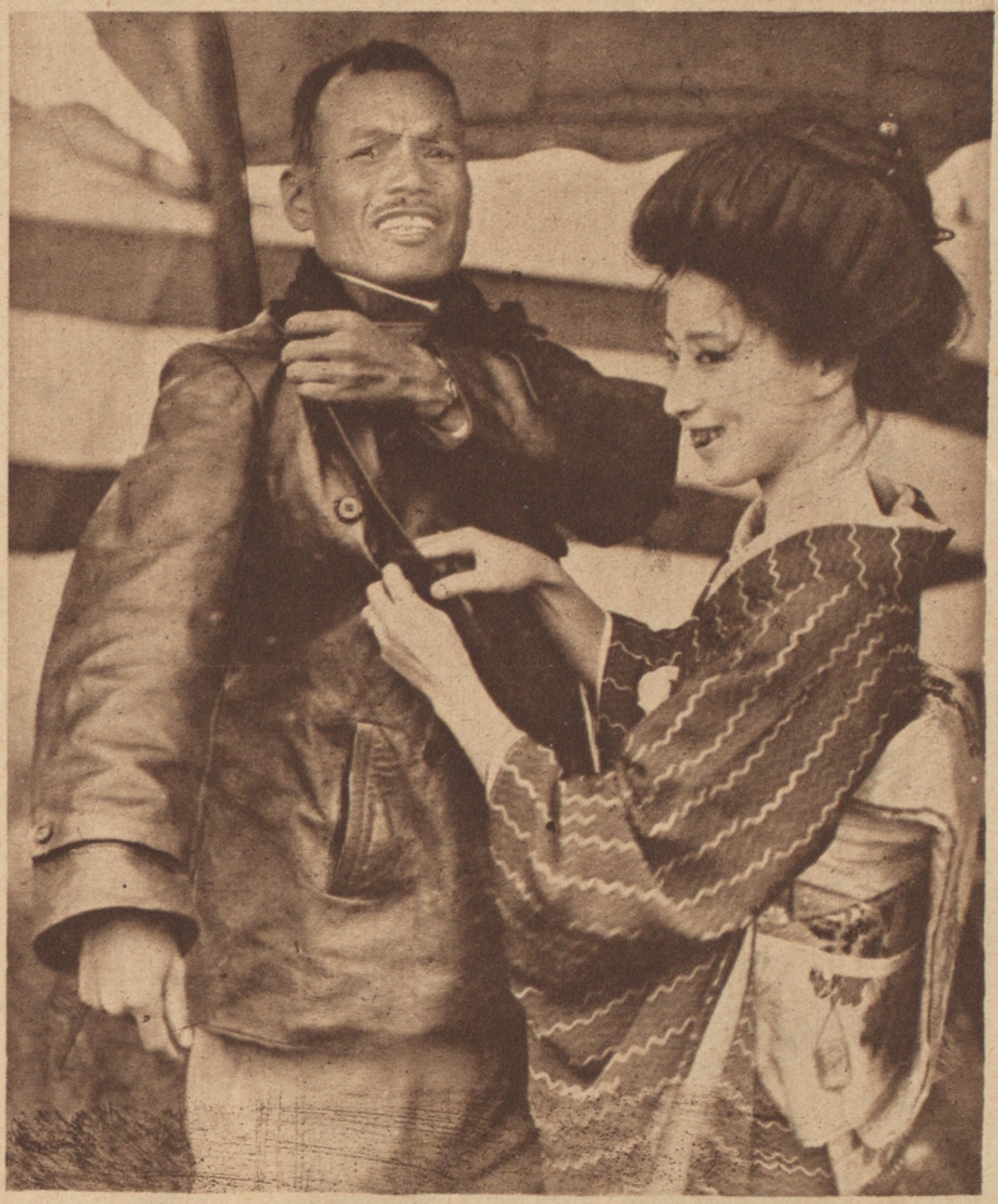
Lt Mizuta Flying for Japan Post, 1919

- January 10 – (United Kingdom - France) Airco DH.4s of the Royal Air Force's No. 2 (Communications) Squadron are converted for transporting passengers and mail between London and Paris, in support of the Versailles Peace Conference.
- February 5 or 6 – (Germany) Although established in December 1917, Deutsche Luft‑Reederei (DLR) operated its first flight in 1919 (reportedly 5 or 6 February) between Berlin and Weimar, carrying newspapers and mail with a converted military biplane (AEG J II / AEG K) for DLR.
- March 1 – (United Kingdom - Germany) An airmail service for British personnel deployed overseas begins between Folkestone, England, and Cologne, Germany.
- March 3 – (United States - Canada) The first U.S. international airmail (60 letters from the Canadian post office for delivery in the U.S.) is carried between Vancouver, British Columbia, and Seattle, Washington, by William Boeing and Eddie Hubbard in a Boeing C-700 seaplane. Following this first successful flight, Hubbard purchased a Boeing B-1 seaplane for routine airmail service between Victoria, B.C., and Seattle.
- March 22 – (France) Société Générale des Transports Aériens (SGTA) began a weekly service between Paris and Brussels, the world's first regular international commercial aviation service. Although the Farman F.60 Goliath aircraft used on the route were capable of carrying both passengers and freight, sources are unclear whether mail or freight were actually on board of this flight.
- March 24 – (France) A mixed air–rail postal service was inaugurated between Paris and Nice, with the route incorporating an airmail segment via Avignon.
- April 18 – (France) CMA (Compagnie des Messageries Aériennes) commences a mail and freight service between Paris and Lille, using ex-military Breguet 14s.
- June 14 – (Newfoundland–Ireland) The first non-stop transatlantic flight and first non-stop transatlantic airmail flight by John Alcock and Arthur Whitten Brown from St. John's, Newfoundland and Labrador to Clifden, Ireland.
- June 14-15 – (United Kingdom - Germany) The British Airco DH.10 “Amiens” heavy bomber performs the world's first night-airmail service, flying between Hawkinge and Cologne.
- July 8 – (France - Europe) A twice-weekly airmail service was established between Constantinople and Bucharest in connection with the Express d’Orient. Initially operated for military purposes from May 1919, on this date it was opened to civilian correspondence, limited to mail dispatched from Constantinople to Bucharest or to France.
- July 22 – (United States) Angered by the insistence of Second Assistant United States Postmaster General Otto Praeger that they fly their routes on time even in zero visibility conditions in order to maintain fixed schedules or be fired – a policy that has resulted in 15 crashes and two fatalities in the previous two weeks alone – U.S. Airmail Service pilots begin a spontaneous strike. After Preager and the United States Post Office Department receive much negative comment in the press, the strike ends in less than a week when the Post Office Department agrees that officials in Washington, D.C., would no longer insist on pilots flying in dangerous weather conditions.
- August – (France) CMA (Compagnie des Messageries Aériennes) commences a mail and freight service between Paris and Brussels.
- August 25 – (United Kingdom–France) The world's first scheduled international daily air-service carrying passengers and cargo began between London and Paris by Aircraft Transport & Travel Ltd. (AT&T).
- September 27 - October 4 – (United Kingdom) A predefined "scheme for the conveyance of urgent Government despatches by airmail" comes into action during the Railway strike of 1919, where RAF and civil airlines come to the aid of the government with a "special air service" to deliver mail packages in the country and combat the strike.
- October 13 – Convention Relating to the Regulation of Aerial Navigation was signed in Paris under the auspices of the League of Nations. This was the first major international agreement regulating civil aviation, establishing the International Commission for Air Navigation (ICAN). For airmail and air cargo, this introduces a regulatory/institutional framework enabling cross-border aviation services (mail, freight, passenger) to develop with clearer rules of sovereignty, overflight, registration, etc.
- October 22 – (Japan) First mail flight in Japan. The Imperial Flying Association held a prize mail flight competition, and three competitors, Mizuta Katota, Yamakake Toyotaro, and Sato Akira, attempted a round-trip mail flight between Tokyo and Osaka. Mizuta made an emergency landing on the outbound flight and was disqualified, but the other two succeeded. The mail from Mizuta's plane was transported to Osaka by train the following day, the 23rd.
- November 11 – (England–Europe) The world's first public overseas airmail service, flying between London and Paris. The service was extended to Holland, Belgium and Morocco the following year.
- November 12 - December 10 – Ross and Keith Smith carried the first airmail from England to Australia flying a Vickers Vimy.
- December 10 – (United States) Second Assistant United States Postmaster General Otto Praeger testifies before the United States House Committee on Post Offices and Post Roads, requesting US$3 million for the creation and operation of airmail routes between New York City and San Francisco, Pittsburgh and Milwaukee, New York City and Atlanta, and St. Louis and Minneapolis, saying that inaugurating these routes would meet the United States Post Office Department goal of "develop[ing] aviation to that point where corporations will come in and run the lines. Then we will make contracts with them as we do with power boat or steamship lines." The United States Congress agrees with the Post office Department's goal, but instead allots Praeger only US$1,375,000 and told him to focus on creating the transcontinental route between New York City and San Francisco.

== Airlines, companies and organizations founded ==
This decade, the following airlines or air cargo related companies or organizations were founded that were or would become important for air cargo and airmail history:

=== 1912 ===
- November 13 – (Germany) Rhenus - a freight forwarding company established by the Badische Actiengesellschaft für Rheinschifffahrt und Seetransport and the Rheinschifffahrts Actiengesellschaft as a joint company with headquarters in Frankfurt under the name Rhenus, after the Latin word for the river Rhine. Branch offices were established in Antwerp, Mainz, Mannheim, and Rotterdam. The business was initially active in freight transport and forwarding on the Rhine, as well as warehousing. In the 1980's, after several mergers, the company established a separate branch for air freight forwarding. It currently belongs to the world's top forwarding companies.

=== 1916 ===
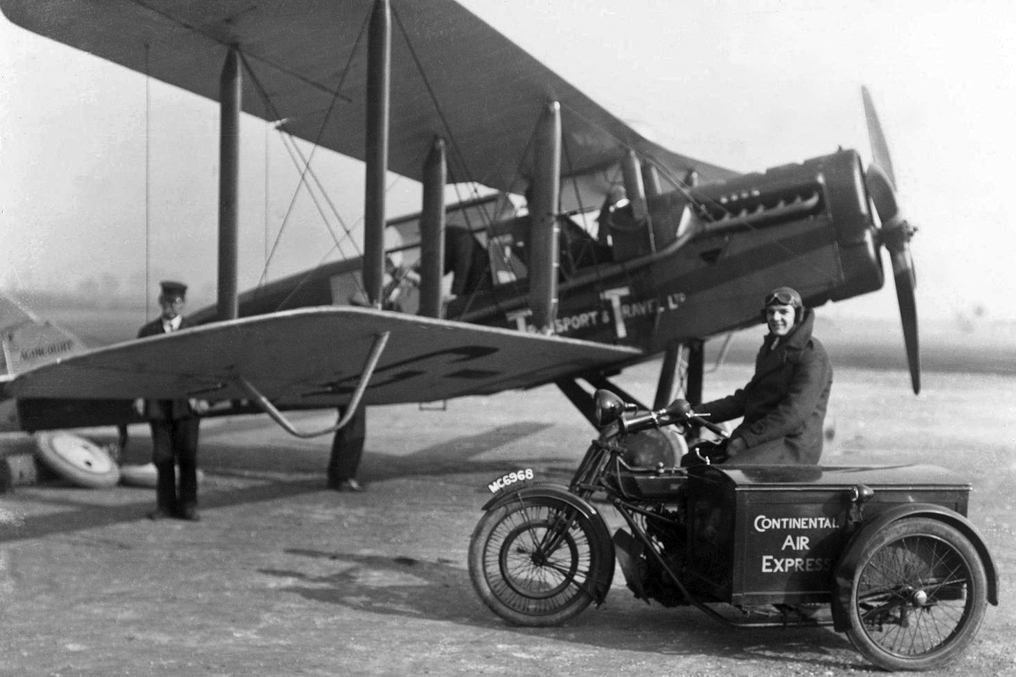
De Havilland DH.16, Aircraft Transport & Travel, probably Croydon 1920

- October 5 – (United Kingdom) Aircraft Transport and Travel Ltd (AT&T) - the first British airline company (formed during WWI); in 1919 it launched the world’s first daily international scheduled service (London–Paris) and won the first British civil airmail contract.

=== 1917 ===
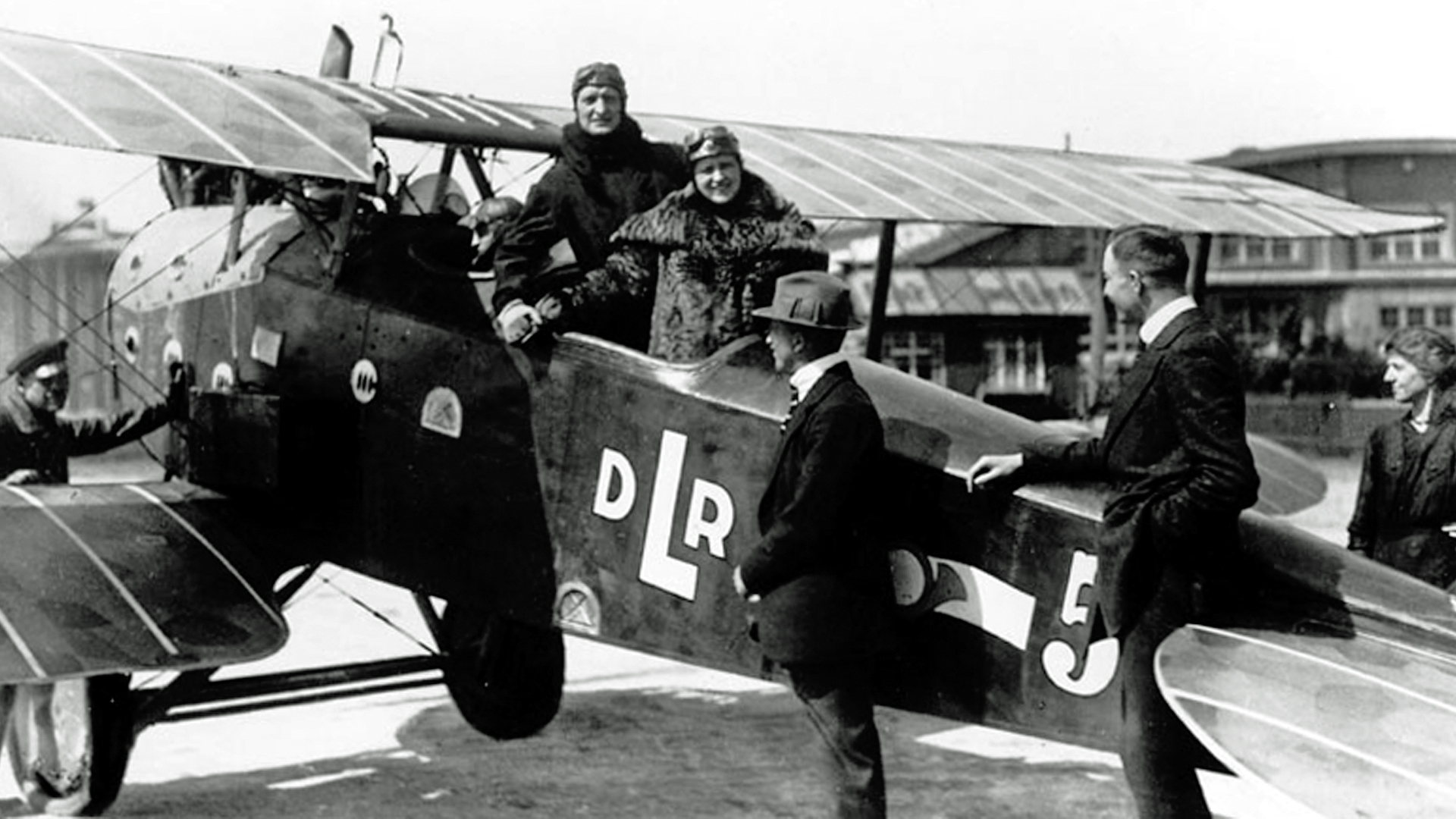
LVG C.VI "DLR 5"of the Deutschen Luft-Reederei (DLR) 5 with passengers Hans Albers and Elsbeth Kurasch, 1919

- December – (Germany) Deutsche Luft-Reederei (D.L.R.) — established December 1917 (commenced services in 1919) - one of Germany’s earliest post-war airlines; started regular services carrying newspapers and mail, and was a founding member of the International Air Traffic Association (the 1919 precursor to today’s IATA).

=== 1918 ===
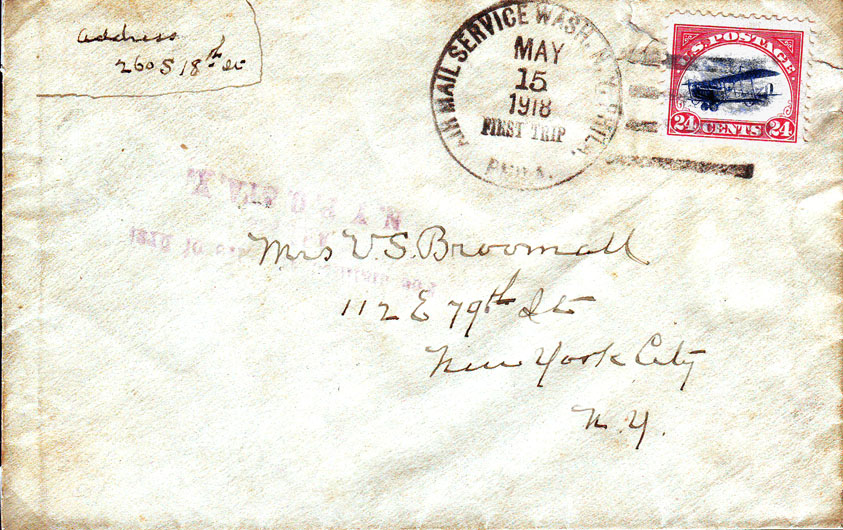
Cover flown on the first day of scheduled Air Mail Service in the U.S. and franked with the first U.S. Air Mail stamp, the 24 Cent "Jenny" (C-3). Cancel: "AIR MAIL SERVICE - WASH. N.Y. PHILA." "MAY 15, 1918 - FIRST TRIP" "PHILA."

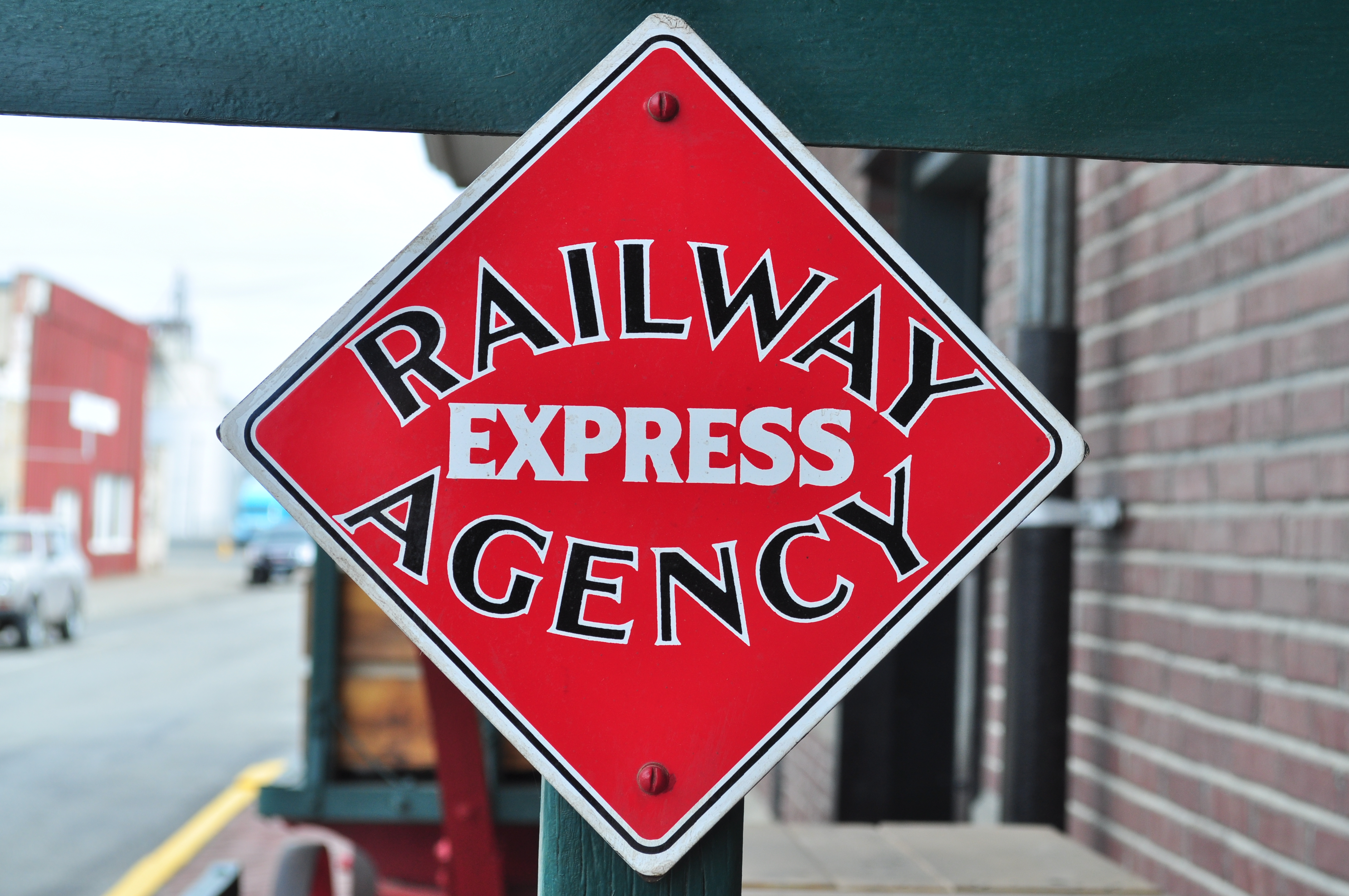
Ritzville, WA - Northern Pacific Railway Depot - Railway Express sign

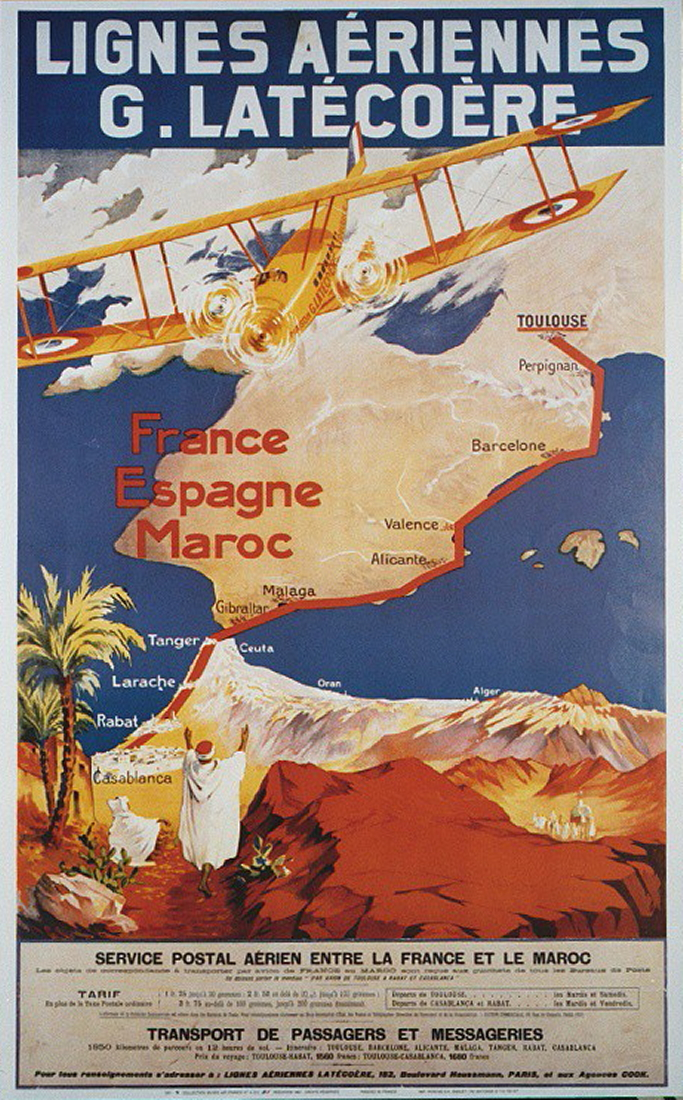
Lignes Aeriennes G. Latécoère Poster

- May 15 – (United States) United States airmail - a service class and operation of the United States Post Office Department (USPOD) and its successor United States Postal Service (USPS) delivering air mail by aircraft flown within the United States and its possessions and territories. Letters and parcels intended for air mail service were marked as "Via Air Mail" (or equivalent), appropriately franked, and assigned to any then existing class or sub-class of the Air Mail service. After an intermittent series of government sponsored experimental flights between 1911 and 1918, domestic U.S. Air Mail was formally established as a new class of service by the Post Office Department on May 15, 1918, with the inauguration of the Washington–Philadelphia–New York route for which the first of special Air Mail stamps were issued. The exclusive transportation of flown mail by government-operated aircraft came to an end in 1926 under the provisions of the Air Mail Act of 1925, better known as the Kelly Act. which required the USPOD to transition to contracting with commercial air carriers to fly them over Contract Air Mail (CAM) routes.
- July 1 – (United States) American Railway Express Agency - one of the first air freight agents in the United States, making a test flight on 14 November 1919. This early success would persist, for decades, with REA dominating the field through 1950s. REA didn't operate its own aircraft, similar to its arrangement with railroads to use space in baggage cars, the company had agreements with dozens of airlines to transport express freight on their aircraft.
- December 25 – (France) (Société des lignes Latécoère), the later Compagnie générale aéropostale or short Aéropostale - became one of the most important early airmail companies, pioneering long postal routes from France into Spain, North Africa and later South America. Operated from 1918 to 1933. The company's activities were to specialise in, but were by no means restricted to, airborne postal services.

=== 1919 ===
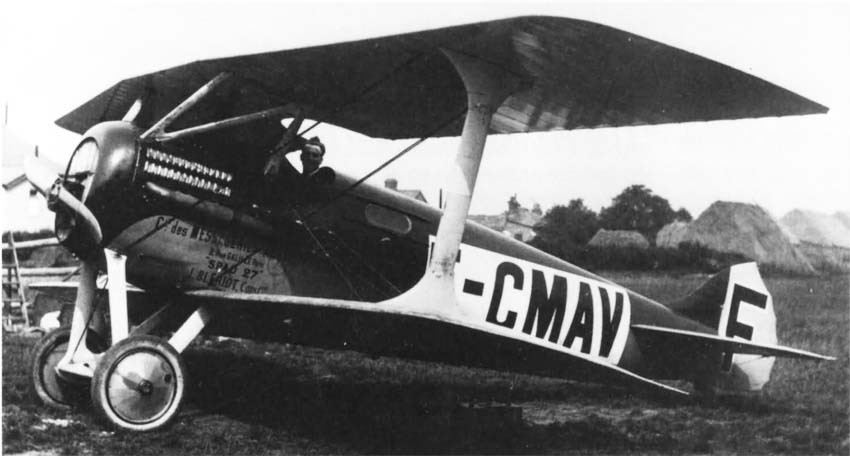
Compagnie des Messageries Aériennes (CMA) Blériot-SPAD S.27 reg. F-CMAY, 1919

- Undated – (United Kingdom) Handley Page Transport Ltd - Handley page converted heavy wartime bombers to carry passengers and mail on continental routes.
- Undated – (United Kingdom) Instone Air Line – an airline founded by a coal/ship-company, specifically to carry its letters/documents by air to expedite ship cargo unloading.
- February 8 – (France) Société Générale des Transports Aériens (SGTA), initially known as the Lignes Aériennes Farman (translated from French: Farman airlines) – an airline that started off with a Farman F.60 Goliath flight from Toussus-le-Noble to Kenley, near Croydon and ran one of the world’s first regular international commercial services for passengers/mail between Paris and Brussels) in 1919 using the same Farman Goliath types. Operated until 1933 when its assets were incorporated in the newly created Air France airline.
- March 31 – (Belgium) Syndicat national d'Etude des Transports Aériens SNETA (translated from French: National Syndicate for the Study of Aerial Transport) - an early airline which operated from 1919 to 1923 in order to pioneer commercial aviation in Belgium flying international / colonial routes. In 1923 it ceased the experimental operations and merged into the newly founded national carrier SABENA.
- April 18 – (France) Compagnie des Messageries Aériennes, initially known as the Lignes Aériennes Farman (Farman airlines) – an airline pioneer, initially focusing on mail/cargo routes, was in operation from 1919 to 1923, when it was merged with Grands Express Aériens to form Air Union.
- June 7 – (United Kingdom) Daimler Air Hire / (later) Daimler Airway - part of the immediate post-war wave of British air operators that carried mail and freight and that later merged into Imperial Airways.
- August 28 – (Netherlands / worldwide) International Air Traffic Association - an airline industry association formed in 1919 in the Hague, the Netherlands, by early carriers to coordinate international services and tariffs - it is the direct antecedent of modern IATA (International Air Transport Association, founded in Havana, Cuba, on 19 April 1945) and important for standardising international air-carriage including mail/freight.
- October 7 – (Netherlands) KLM (Koninklijke Luchtvaart Maatschappij / Royal Dutch Airlines) - commenced operations 1920; KLM is the world’s oldest airline still operating under its original name and early carried mail/cargo on its international / colonial routes.

== First flights ==
This decade, the following aircraft that were or would become important for air cargo and airmail history had their first flight:

=== 1910 ===
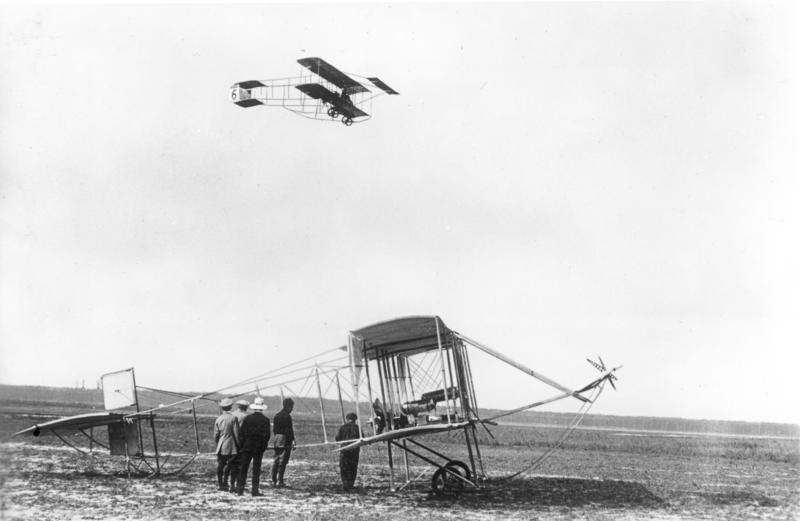
Sommer biplane (on the ground), Berlin-Johannisthal Air Field, 1910

- Undated – (France) Sommer 1910 Biplane - an early French aircraft designed by Roger Sommer. It was a pusher configuration biplane resembling the successful Farman III, and was built in large numbers for the time. A small number of license-built copies of the Sommer biplane were built in England by Humber and one was used to carry out the world's first official mail-carrying flight, when 6,500 letters were flown by Henri Pequet from the United Provinces Exhibition at Allahabad to Naini.
- Undated – (United States) Wiseman-Cooke - the aircraft used for the first air mail flight officially sanctioned by a U.S. post office in February 1911, constructed and flown by Fred Wiseman.

=== 1911 ===
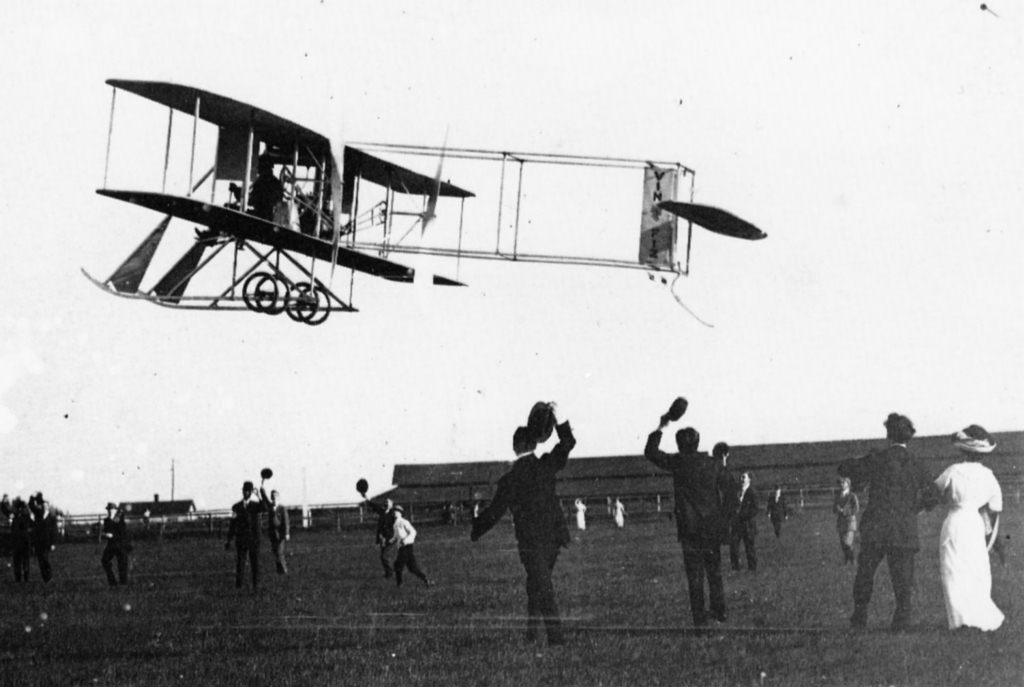
"Vin Fiz" Wright Model EX takes off from Sheepshead Bay, 1911

- Undated – (United States) Wright Model EX – an early biplane built by the Wright Brothers. It is a scaled-down, single-seat derivative of the Wright Model B designed specifically for exhibition flying, including the promotion of airmail, (hence the "EX" designation). Two examples were built. One of them—the Vin Fiz Flyer—in 1911 became the first aircraft to fly coast-to-coast across the U.S., a journey that took almost three months.

=== 1912 ===
- Undated – (France) Deperdussin Monocoque – an early racing aircraft built in 1912 by the Aéroplanes Deperdussin, a French aircraft manufacturer started in 1911 and reorganized as the Société Pour L'Aviation et ses Dérivés (SPAD) in 1913. Deperdussin monoplanes (including the 1912 monocoque racing types) were used by exhibition pilots who carried postcards/philatelic mail for fairs.

=== 1915 ===
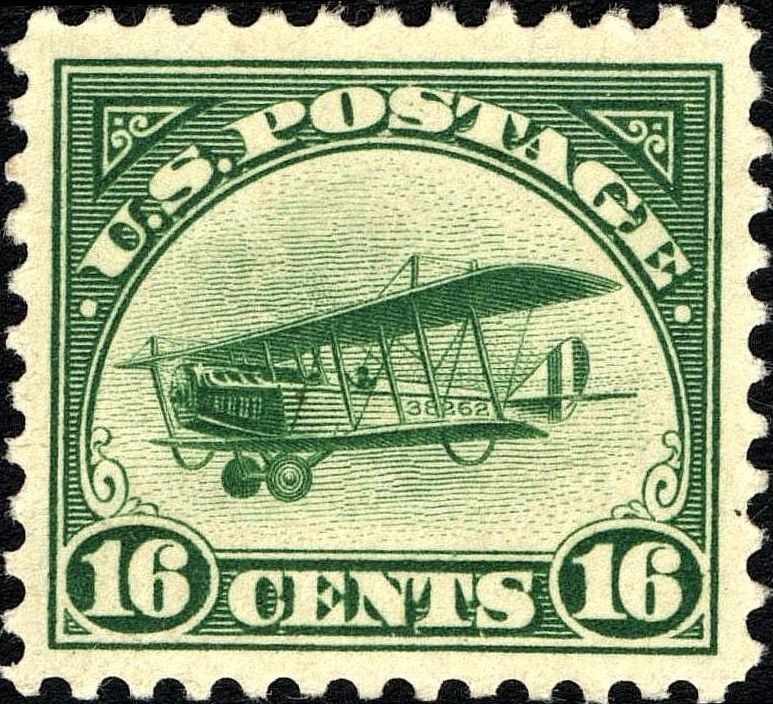
Curtis Jenny stamp, 16c, 1918 issue

- Undated – (United States) Curtiss JN-4D "Jenny" – a series of biplanes built by the Glenn Curtiss Aeroplane Company of Hammondsport, New York, later the Curtiss Aeroplane and Motor Company. Although the Curtiss JN series was originally produced as a training aircraft for the US Army, the "Jenny" (the common nickname derived from "JN") continued after World War I modified as a civilian aircraft, becoming the "backbone of American postwar [civil] aviation", where the front seat was replaced with a mail compartment.
- Undated – (United States) Curtiss R-4LM - a utility aircraft produced for the United States Army and Navy during World War I as a conventional, two-bay biplane with slightly staggered wings of unequal span, modified in 1918 for the U.S. Post Office by converting the front cockpit into a cargo hold for airmail. Six aircraft were ordered.

=== 1916 ===
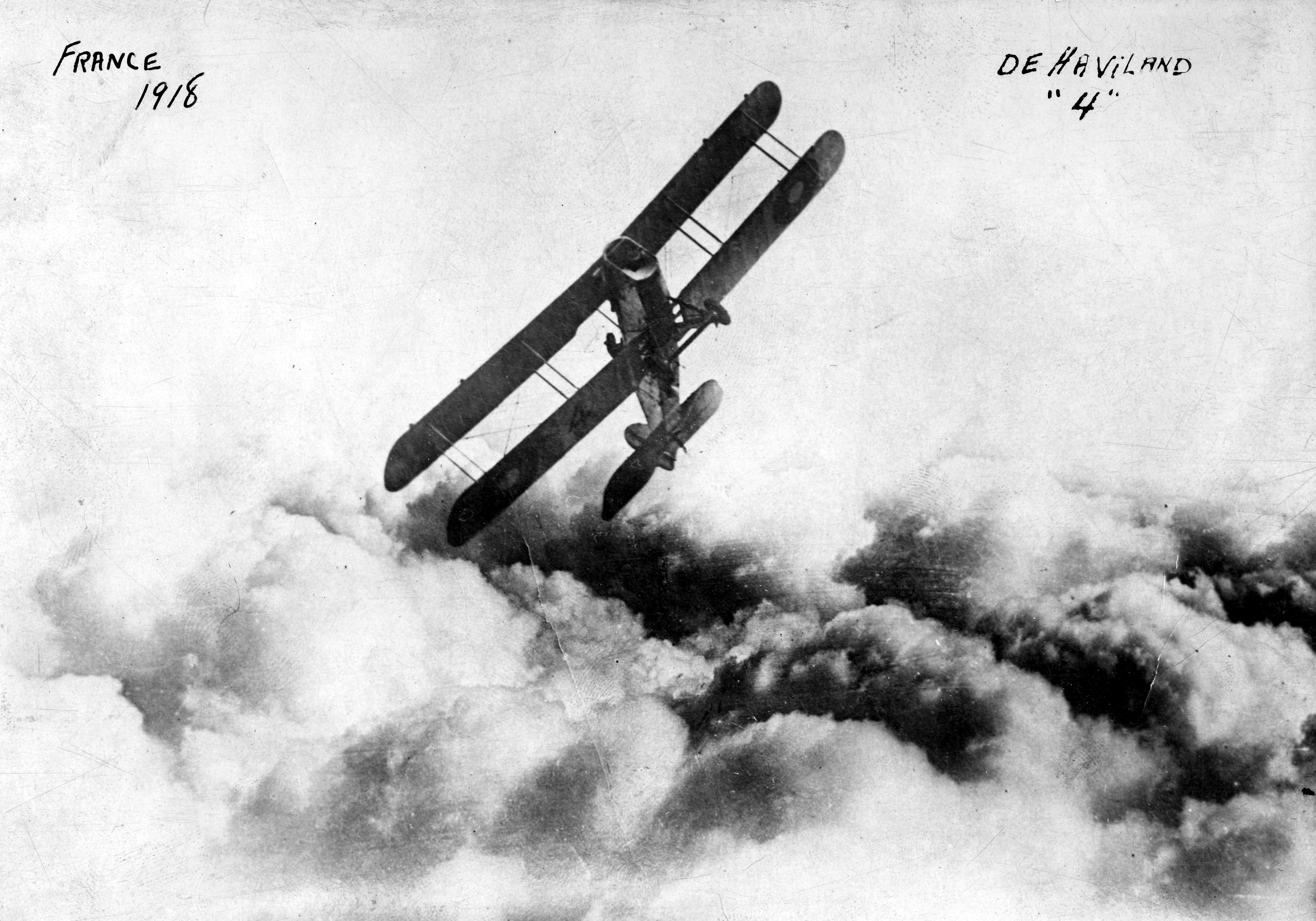
Airco DH-4 soaring above the clouds in France, 1918

- Undated – (United Kingdom) De Havilland (Airco) DH.4B and Twin DH – a British two-seat biplane day bomber of the First World War, converted as DH.4B for mail - extensively used in the United Kingdom as well as the United States for post-war mail from 1919 onward. Of the L.W.F. J-2 twin-engine long range development of DH-4 (also known as Twin DH) 20 aircraft were built for the U.S. Post Office.
- Undated – (United States) Standard JR-1B - a two-seat basic trainer two-bay biplane produced in the United States from 1916 to 1918, factory modified (from the JR-1) as a mail plane for the U.S. Post Office. The six aircraft ordered are thus said to be "the first planes designed with airmail in mind".

=== 1917 ===
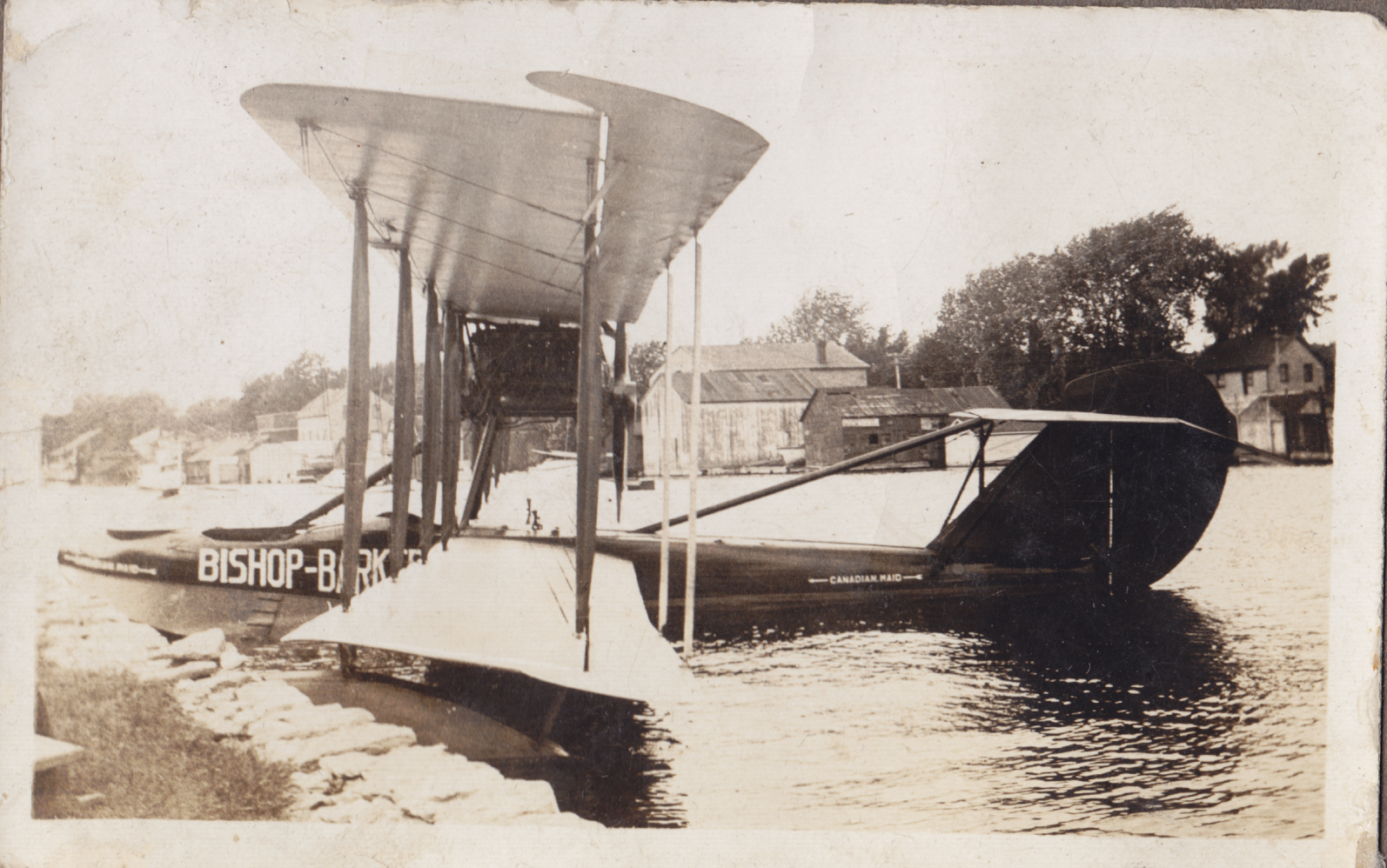
Curtiss HS-2L flyingboat Canadian Maid owned by Bishop-Barker Aeroplanes at Victoria Park in Belleville, ON

- Undated – (United States) Curtiss HS - a single-engined patrol flying boat built for the United States Navy during World War I. Large numbers were built from 1917 to 1919, with the type being used to carry out anti-submarine patrols from bases in France from June 1918. It remained in use with the US Navy until 1928, and was also widely used as a civil passenger and utility aircraft. After World War I, the U.S. Navy donated or sold surplus HS-2L aircraft to Canada, where they became the pioneering "bush planes". Due to Canada's geography and abundance of lakes, the flying boat design was ideal for accessing remote northern communities. These aircraft were used for a variety of utility roles, including delivering mail and providing the first regular, scheduled air service in the country.

=== 1918 ===
- Undated – (United States) Martin MB-1 (Martin mail plane) – an American large biplane bomber designed and built by the Glenn L. Martin Company for the United States Army Air Service, also used to carry mail for the U.S. Post Office.

=== 1919 ===
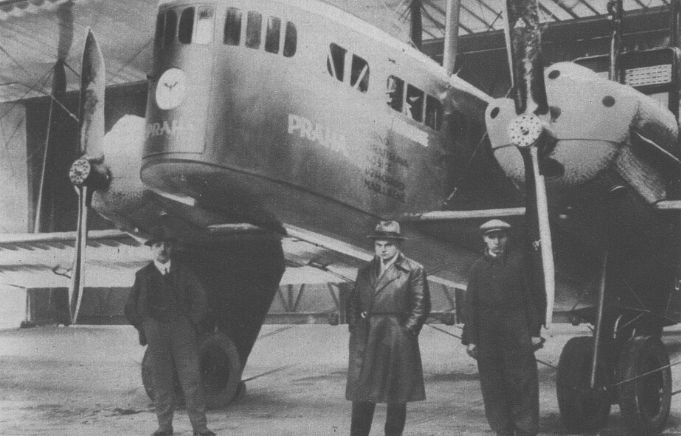
Farman Goliath of CSA

- January – (France) Farman F.60 Goliath – an early large transport used on mail/passenger routes.
- June 25 – (France) Junkers F 13 and Junkers-Larsen JL-6 – the world's first all-metal transport aircraft, designed and produced by the German aircraft manufacturer Junkers, widely in Europe and the Americas on passenger/mail routes as well as for military transport purposes. The Junkers-Larsen JL-6 was an American version of the F 13 built by Junkers-Larsen; eight were built for the U.S. Post Office.

== Context ==
The air cargo and airmail events of this decade took place within the following historical context:

- 1910s
  - 1914–1918 – World War I
  - 1914–1918 – Aviation in World War I
- 1910
- 1910 in aviation
- 1911
- 1911 in aviation
- 1912
- 1912 in aviation
- 1913
- 1913 in aviation
- 1914
- 1914 in aviation
- 1915
- 1915 in aviation
  - Undated – (France) The first practical use of airborne wireless (radio) for artillery spotting. Lightweight wireless sets (e.g., the RFC's Transmitter No. 1) were used in 1915 (notably in the Battle of Neuve Chapelle, March 1915) to relay observations and adjust artillery fire; a major enabling technological milestone for air operations.
- 1916
- 1916 in aviation
- 1917
- 1917 in aviation
- 1918
- 1918 in aviation
- 1919
- 1919 in aviation
  - Undated – (United States) First successful free-fall test jump from an airplane with parachute.

== Pictures from the decade ==
air cargo and airmail in the decade 1910-1919

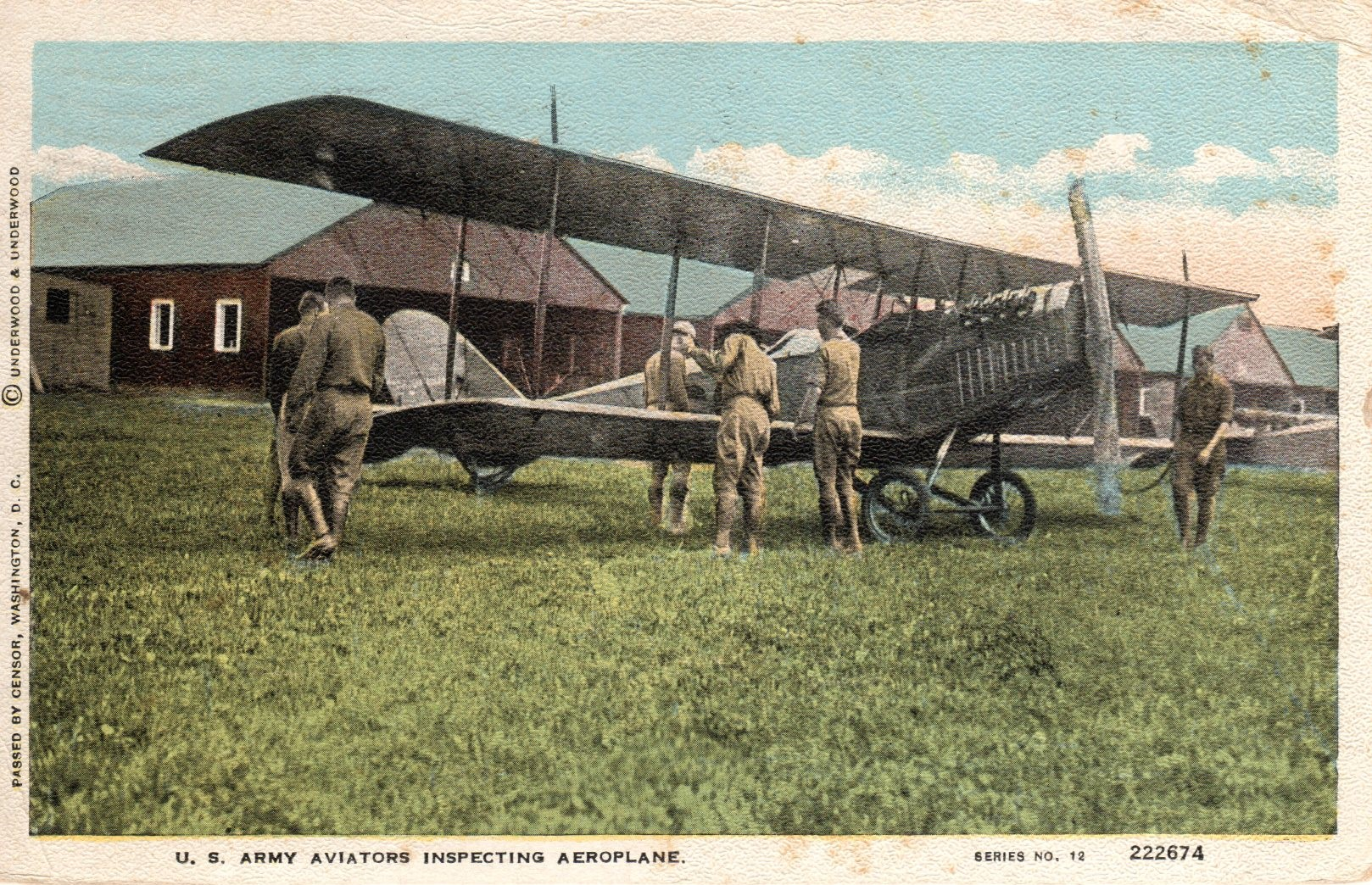
First US government Airmail used military aircraft and personnel, circa 1911-1917.

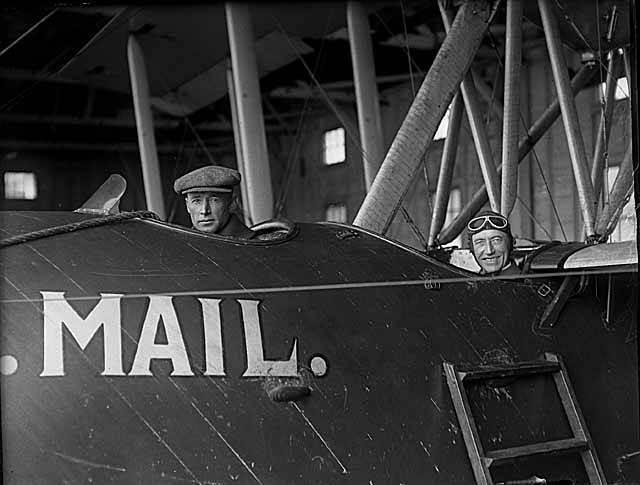
Eddie Hubbard and unidentified man in a mail plane, Seattle, circa 1919.

== See also ==
- Timeline of Air Cargo
- 1920s in air cargo
- 1930s in air cargo
- 1940s in air cargo
- 1950s in air cargo
- 1960s in air cargo
