= Timeline of air cargo =

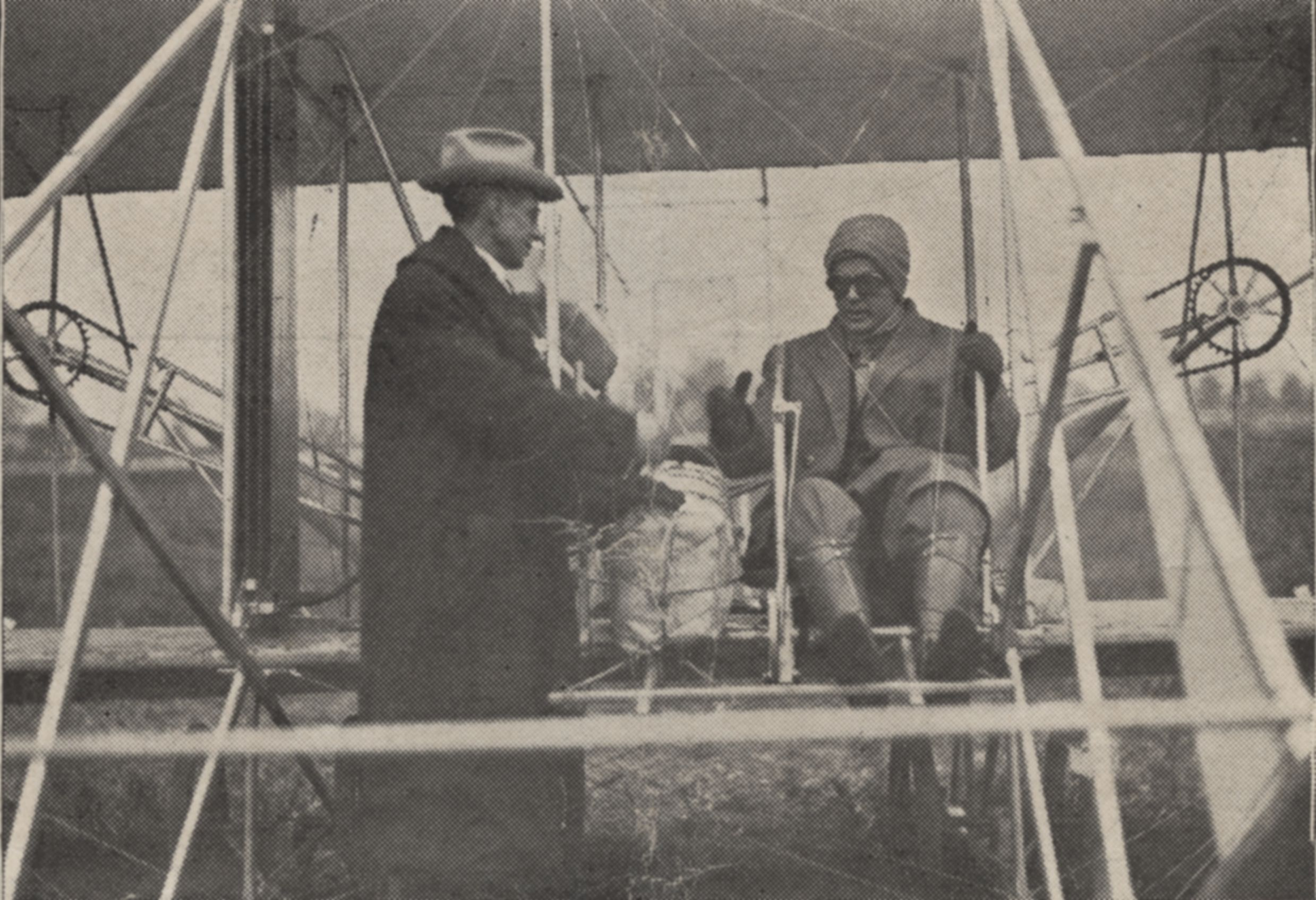
World's first air cargo freight flight arriving at Columbus, Ohio, United States, on November 7, 1910

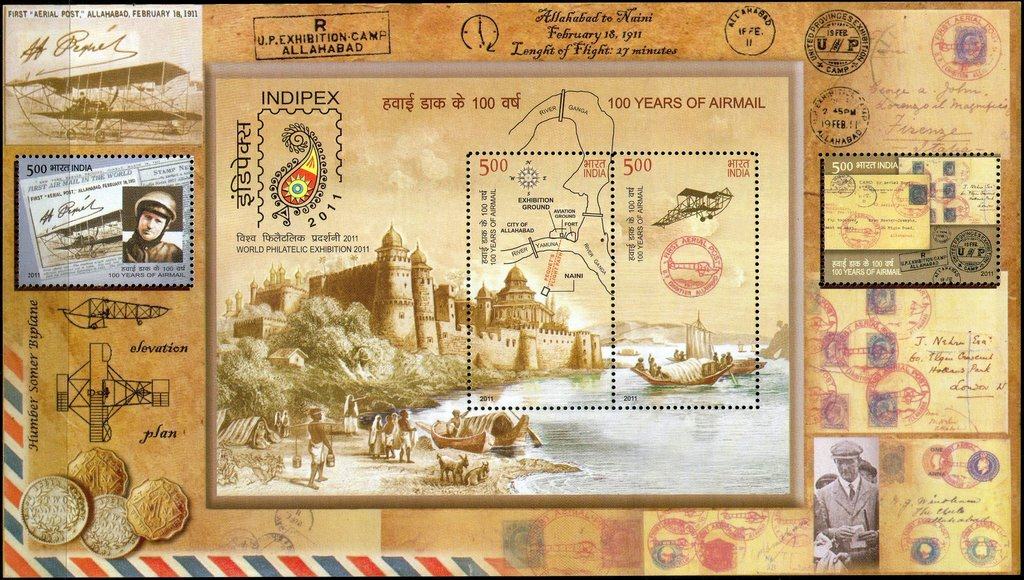
Stamp of India - 2011 - Centenary of World s First Airmail Flight in 1911

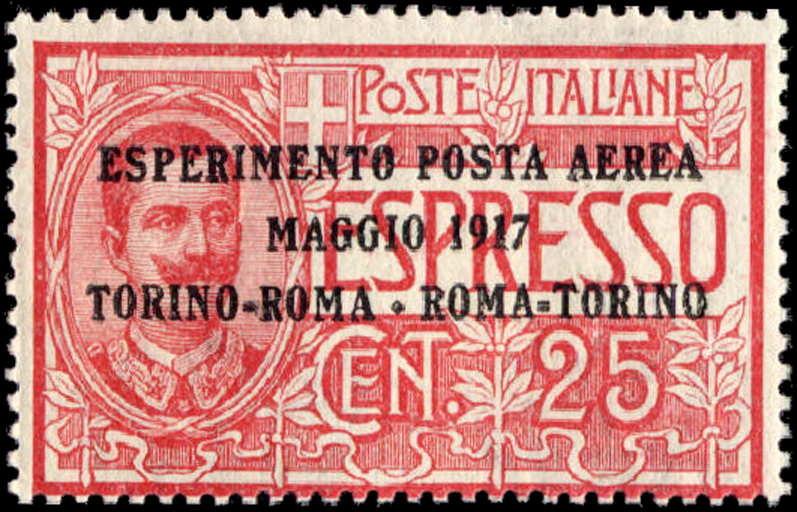
World’s first official airmail stamp, Italy, 1917

This is a timeline of air cargo and airmail history, and a list of more detailed air cargo and airmail timelines. The timelines overlap with the timeline of aviation, but focus specifically on the transport of cargo or freight within air transport as an overall mode of transport.

== Distinctions ==
=== Airmail vs air cargo ===
Although airmail has a special legal and regulatory status under postal frameworks – governed by Universal Postal Union (UPU) regulations for postal operators and designated postal carriers – it is typically treated today as a subset of air cargo, which refers to all property transported by aircraft (excluding baggage). In the early decades of aviation, the carriage of mail was one of the primary drivers of air transport infrastructure, aircraft development, and contracted air services. However, from the late 1960's, growth in non-postal freight (parcels, industrial goods, supplies) increased rapidly, aided by larger aircraft and extended route networks, reducing the dominance of mail in overall air freight volumes and value. In the early 21st century, the boom in e-commerce and express parcel delivery has driven strong growth in small parcels and mail-like shipments, which has further blurred the distinction between traditional postal mail and commercial air freight parcels.

=== Civil vs military ===
Civil and military air cargo operations have historically influenced one another in a reciprocal manner. Technological advancements and innovations originating in military contexts—particularly during periods of conflict—have frequently been adapted for civilian use. Conversely, developments in civil aviation and logistics often serve as foundational technologies for subsequent military applications. This is also applicable for the domains of aviation, logistics and air cargo, where shared infrastructure, dual-use technologies, and evolving operational practices reflect the ongoing exchange between civil and military sectors.

== Timeline ==
=== Details per decade ===
- Air cargo before the 1900s (before powered airplanes)
- 1900s in air cargo
- 1910s in air cargo
- 1920s in air cargo
- 1930s in air cargo
- 1940s in air cargo
- 1950s in air cargo
- 1960s in air cargo
- 1970s in air cargo
- 1980s in air cargo
- 1990s in air cargo
- 2000s in air cargo
- 2010s in air cargo
- 2020s in air cargo

== See also ==
- Cargo aircraft
- Cargo airlines
- Airlift
- Timeline of aviation
- List of firsts in aviation
- Timeline of transportation technology
