= Flugpost am Rhein und am Main =

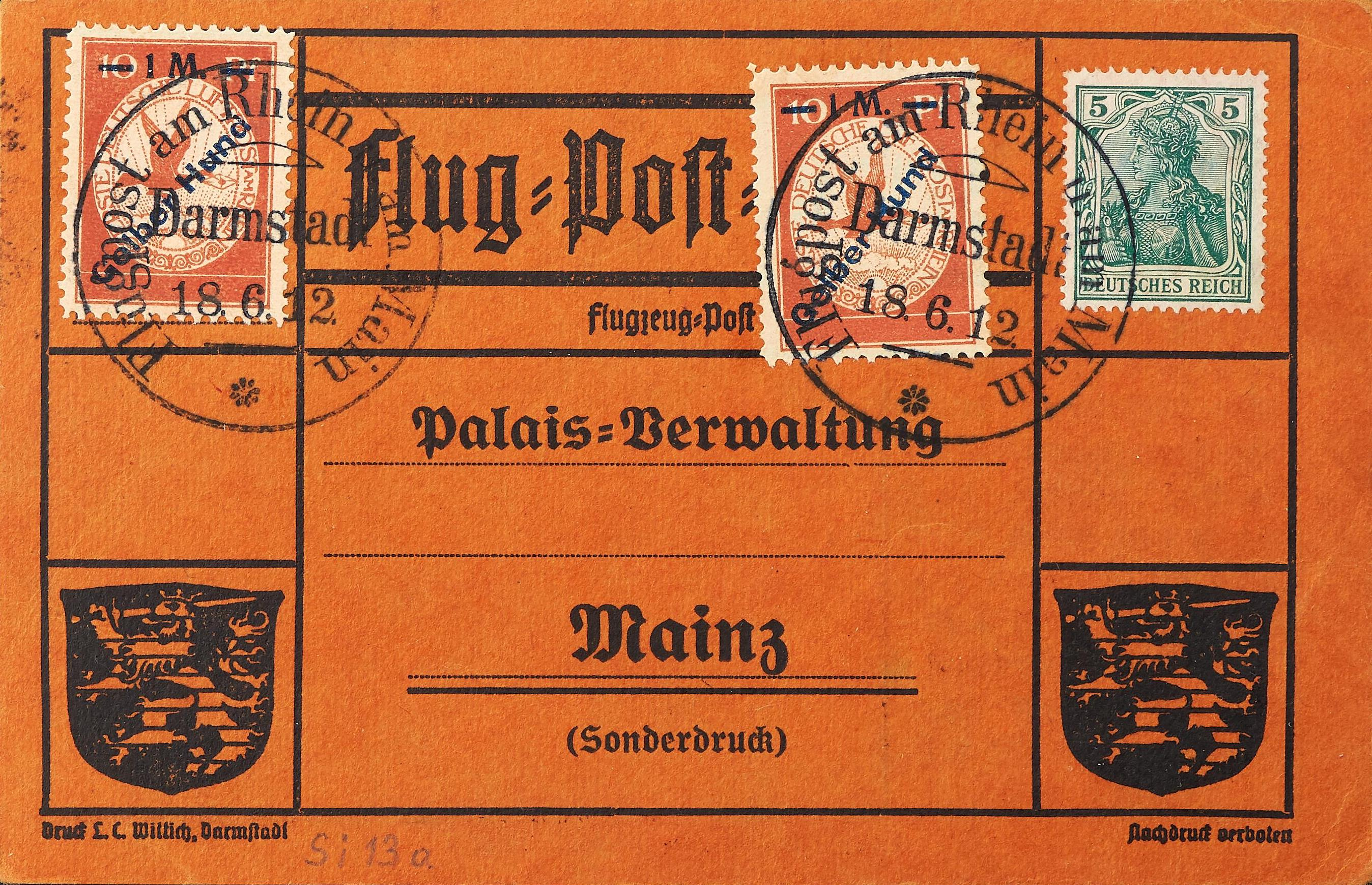
Postcard flown on 18 June 1912 on Frankfurt am Rhein to Mainz airmail service

The Flugpost am Rhein und am Main (English: Airmail on the Rhine and Main) of 1912 was an early landmark in postal history, in which mail flights took place between Frankfurt am Main Mainz, Offenbach am Main, Worms and Darmstadt.

== Event overview ==
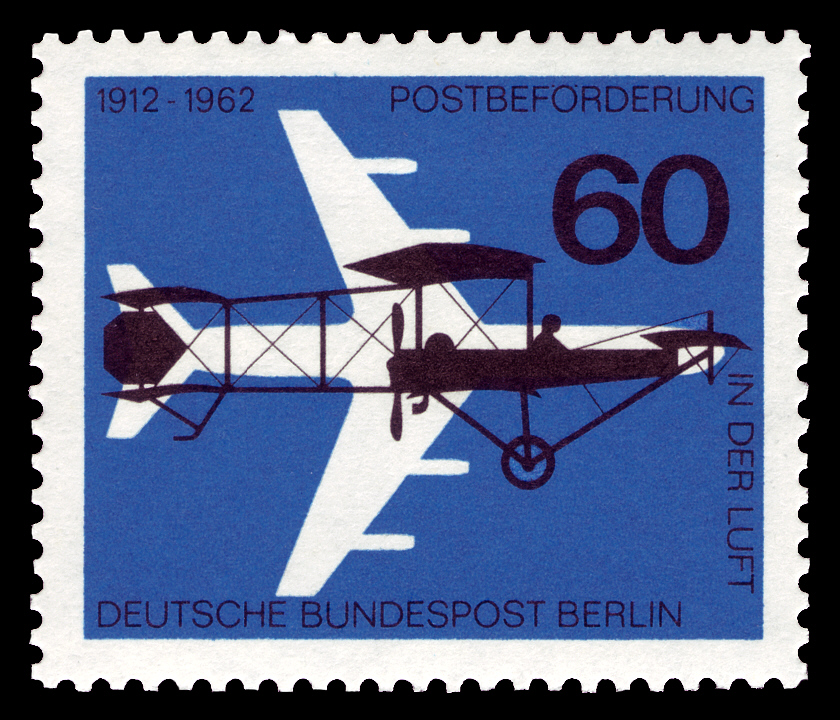
On the occasion of "50 years of airmail transport" a stamp was made in Berlin in 1962 showing a four-jet airplane. In front of the plane was the "Yellow Dog" from 1912 from the Euler company.

The airmail on the Rhine and Main took place from 9–23 June 1912 under the patronage of Grand Duke Ernst Ludwig and Grand Duchess Eleonore of Hesse. The proceeds went to the Großherzogliche Zentrale für Mutter- und Säuglingsfürsorge in Hessen (Grand Ducal Head Office for Mother and Infant Welfare in Hesse). The airmail was carried by the airship Schwaben and August Euler's aircraft Gelber Hund. In order for the cards to be transported they had to be provided with semi-official postage stamps, called airmail stamps. Although these had no postal value, but were instead issued by the event organizer, they received a postal validation.

== First flight ==
On 10 June 1912 at 19:04 hours, Ferdinand von Hiddessen flew from Frankfurt-Niederrad with 40 kilograms of mail to Darmstadt in a biplane of the brand Euler, named "Gelber Hund" because of its yellow wings. He covered the 27-kilometer distance in 13:27 minutes. A mail exchange took place in Darmstadt and then Hiddessen flew to Worms with 79 kg of mail, where he landed at about 9 pm. This flight with the Yellow Dog, owing to its notoriety in postal history, marked the beginning of the airmail week — from June 10 to June 23, 1912 on the Rhine and Main rivers, taking place in Worms, Darmstadt, Frankfurt am Main, Mainz and Offenbach. It is regarded as one of the first major airmail events with official airmail transport in the world and thus marks the beginning of German airmail history. A flight postcard was produced for the postal transport, which had to be franked with an airmail stamp in addition to the regular postcard postage of 5 Pfennigs.

== Literature ==
- Das Archiv, Hrsg. Deutsche Gesellschaft für Post- und Telekommunikationsgeschichte; ISSN 0947-9945:
  - O. Kühndelt: Vor 50 Jahren: Erste Postluftfahrt; (Archiv für Deutsche Postgeschichte); Booklet 1 from 1962; S. 3–12
  - Imke Schabel: Der Weltweit erste Postflug – Von Frankfurt über Darmstadt nach Worms; Booklet 1/2 from 2002; S. 120–121
  - Tanja Neumann: Eine Idee lernt fliegen – Die Initiative Luftfahrtmuseum August Euler; Booklet 2 from 2012; S. 40–41
- Ausstellungskatalog: 100 Jahre Flugpost an Rhein und Main; 11. June 2012
