= 70r Red Army Soldier error =

Rare Soviet Russian postage stamp with printing error

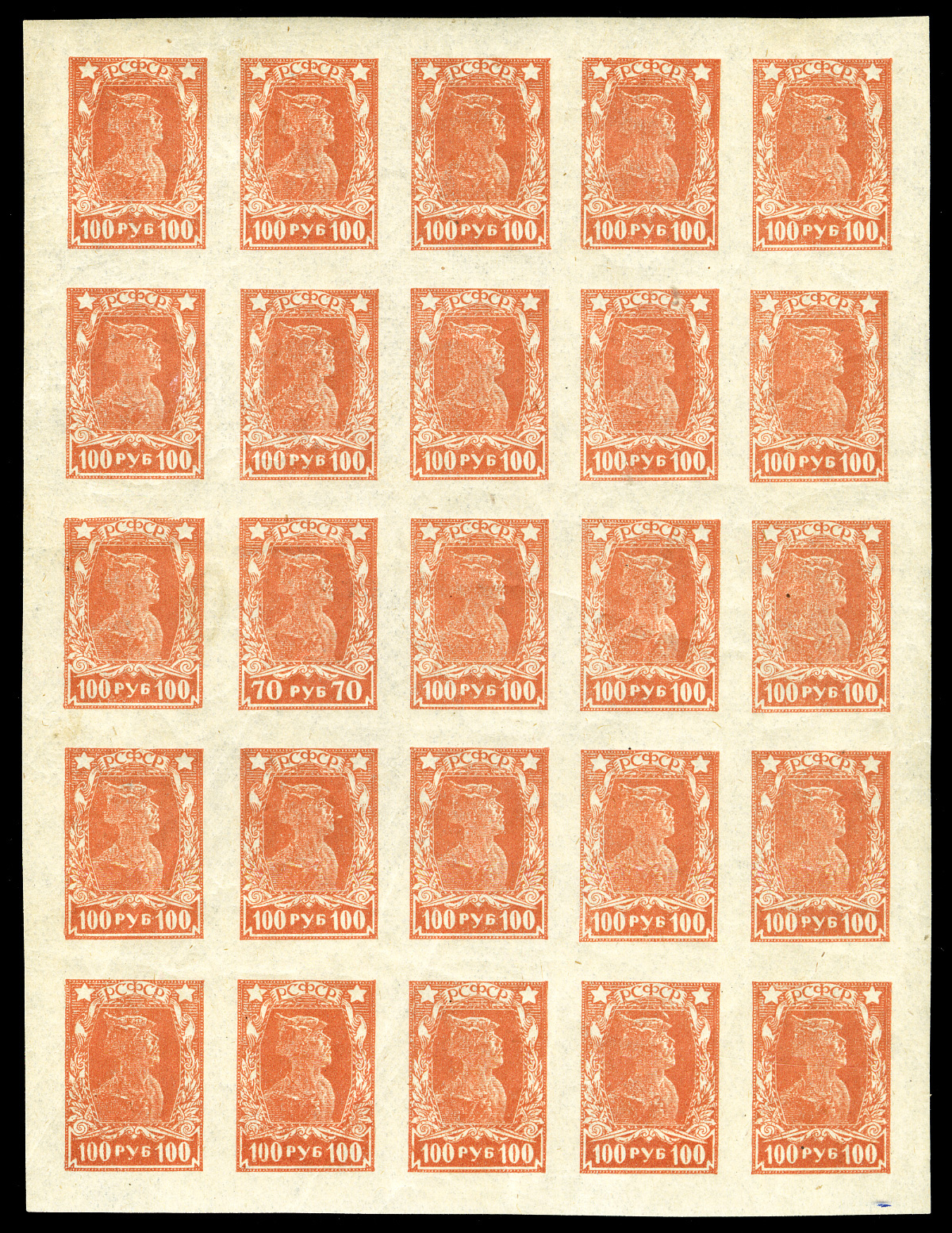
- Sheet of the RSFSR 100-ruble Red Army Soldier imperforate stamps, with the 70-ruble error, 1922
- Country of production: Soviet Russia
- Location of production: Moscow
- Date of production: December 1922; 103 years ago – January 1923; 103 years ago
- Designer: Ivan Shadr (sculpture); A. G. Yakimchenko (ornamental frame)
- Engraver: A. I. Troitsky
- Perforation: none
- Depicts: Red Army soldier
- Nature of rarity: double printing error (imperforate, with a 70-ruble stamp)
- No. in existence: only 4 sheets exist
- Face value: 70 rubles
- Estimated value: $126,500 (February 2014)

The 70r Red Army Soldier error or RSFSR 70r error of 1922 is one of the rarest postage stamps issued by Soviet Russia. Due to the double printing error, one cliché of the imperforate 25-stamp sheet has a 70-ruble value instead of the correct 100-ruble. Only four intact complete sheets are known.

== Description ==
The sheets contain 25 imperforate 100-ruble orange stamps depicting the Red Army soldier that appeared in the RSFSR 1922 Workers and Soldiers definitive issue. The twelfth stamp in the sheet has a denomination of 70 rubles, unlike all the others, which have a face value of 100 rubles.

== Rarity ==
Only four complete sheets of 25 exist, including one in the state collection of the A.S. Popov Central Museum of Communications in Saint Petersburg, Russia.

These were described as "one of the greatest rarities in Russian philately", and "an important highlight of Russian Soviet Federative Republic collection."

On 20 February 2014, Cherrystone Auctions in New York City offered one complete Red Army Soldier sheet, among the items of the Igor Gorski specialised collection of Russia that contained many errors and unique varieties of the RSFSR period. It was sold for $126,500.

== See also ==
- Definitive stamps of Russia
- Definitive stamps of the Soviet Union
- Errors, freaks, and oddities
- First USSR stamps
- Gold Standard issue
- List of postage stamps
- Postage stamps and postal history of Russia
- Soviet and post-Soviet postage rates
- Soviet Union stamp catalogue
