= First stamp of the Russian Empire =

Russian postage stamp

First stamp of the Russian Empire.
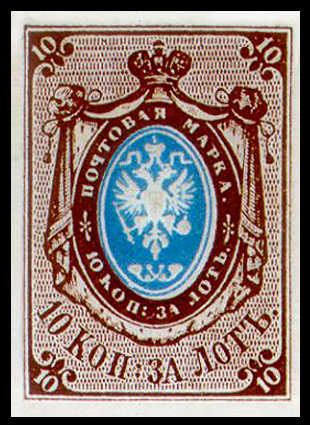
- Country of production: Russian Empire
- Location of production: Saint Petersburg
- Date of production: 10 December 1857; 168 years ago
- Designer: Franz Kepler
- Engraver: Franz Kepler
- Perforation: none
- Depicts: Russian coat of arms, emblem of the Post Office
- Notability: first definitive postage stamp of the Russian Empire
- No. in existence: unknown
- Face value: 10 kopecks
- Estimated value: up to $12,500 (2007)

The first stamp of the Russian Empire was a postage stamp issued in 1857 and introduced within the territory of the Russian Empire in 1858. It was an imperforate 10-kopeck stamp depicting the coat of arms of Russia, and printed using typography in brown and blue.

== History ==
In 1851, a head of post rail transportation, Alexey Charukovsky, was sent abroad to study the experience of using postage stamps. After visiting England, France, Belgium, Netherlands, Italy, Austria, Switzerland, and Germany and gathering a lot of information, he returned to Russia in 1852. However, the Crimean War impeded innovations in the postal area. Eventually, in 1855, Charukovsky filed the Commander-in-Chief of the Postal Department Count Vladimir Adlerberg (1791–1884) a project detailing the activities to introduce adhesive stamps in Russia. According to the Charukovsky's plan, Russian postage stamps were to have a circular shape with a perforation around the picture, and they should have portrayed the coat of arms of the Russian Empire printed in few colours. Furthermore, paper grades had to be protected from forgery. The project was approved on 12 November 1856.

Meanwhile, on 30 July 1856 essays of the first "stempel" stamps were made under the supervision of the head of typographical department of the Expedition of Storing State Papers (ESSP) (Note: Russian: Экспедиция заготовления государственных бумаг, shortly ЭЗГБ. Currently, this is the Federal State Unitary Enterprise "Goznak".) Jacques Reichel (1780–1857). They were of two design types: the coat of arms of the Russian Empire, and the Mercury head.

Reichel's essays of the Russia's first “stempel” stamps, 1856

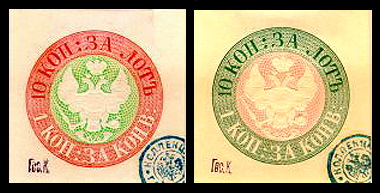
Coat of arms type

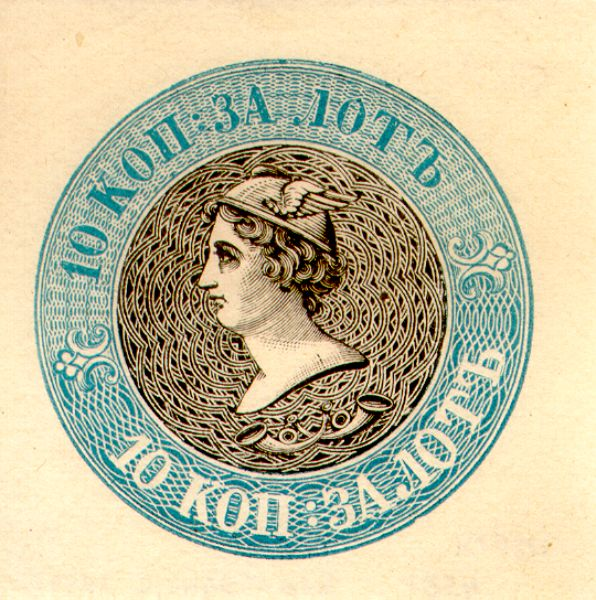
Mercury head type

The stamps were round in shape. This was because Charukovsky had suggested that a rectangular stamp pasted carelessly on an envelope might catch with its angle on a post box or other letters and peel off. This, in turn, could lead to a return of letters to a sender and it would be required to announce about such incident in newspapers. Each stamp type was printed in four colours: green, blue, black, and carmine. However, these stamps were eventually not approved.

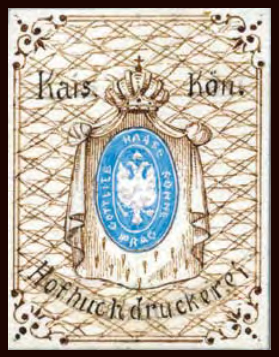
Austrian printer's sample stamp made by Gottlieb Haase & Sons and used by Kepler as a prototype. The item was gifted by Nicholas II to Agathon Fabergé

A new design of the first Russian postage stamp, of rectangular shape, was created by an ESSP's senior engraver Franz (Feodor) Kepler, who submitted it for consideration on 21 October 1856. Preparing his stamp sketch, Kepler carefully examined all materials brought by Charukovsky from abroad, including the original designs and samples of stamps of different countries. As a prototype for creating the Russian postage stamp, Kepler took a printer's sample stamp made by the Prague firm Gottlieb Haase & Sons (Note: German: Gottlieb Haase Söhne.) that was proposed for the Austrian stamps of rectangular shape.

== Production ==
On 20 October 1857, Alexander II approved three two-colour samples printed in denominations of 10, 20, and 30 kopecks. On 9 November, the Emperor ordered to call them "postage stamps" instead of "stempel" stamps. Manufacturing of the 10-kopeck stamps began in November. The first Russian postage stamp was printed on a white hand-made paper with a watermark in the form of a figure "1", 15 mm high. Since a punching machine ordered from the Österreichische Staatsdruckerei (Note: German: Österreichische Staatsdruckerei (Austrian National Print Office).) in Vienna was received only on 19 November and in a state of disrepair, it was decided to hand over a part of the printed imperforate 10-kopeck stamps to the Postal Department for their further distribution to the provinces.

Stamps were produced using two printing presses. One was received from Berlin, and it was used for printing the blue oval with the embossed Russian coat of arms and emblem of the Post Office. The brown frame of the stamp design was printed with the second press.

== Circulation ==
The first Russian postage stamp was officially issued on 22 December [O.S. 10 December] 1857, by the circular of the Postal Department "On the bringing of postal stamps for the common use" that also directed the following:

Starting from 1 January of the next year 1858, usual private letters to all the places of the Empire, the Kingdom of Poland, and the Grand Duchy of Finland brought to the post in usual envelopes or without envelope at all just with addresses written on the letter itself should be sent only with the stamp corresponding to the letter weight.

The stamps went on sale 10 December 1857, but officially people started to use them to pay internal correspondence in Russia on 1 January 1858, and on 1 March 1858 in the Caucasus, Transcaucasia, and Siberia. Since then, all private letters had been sent only with postal stamps that were cancelled with two crossed lines. This was because the supply of the numerous post offices with postmarks took a while and the Postal Department ordered to cancel stamps with pen and ink following the previous practice of cancelling stamped envelopes. A total of 3,00,000 stamps were printed.

The first stamp value of a 10-kopeck had to be used for letters weighing up to one lot (about 12.8 grams). This was followed on 10 January by 20-kopeck and 30-kopeck perforated stamps using the same design but in different pairs of colours, along with a perforated version of the 10-kopeck stamp. The paper was originally watermarked with a colorless numeral, but this was soon abandoned, and later printings in 1858 are on regular wove paper.

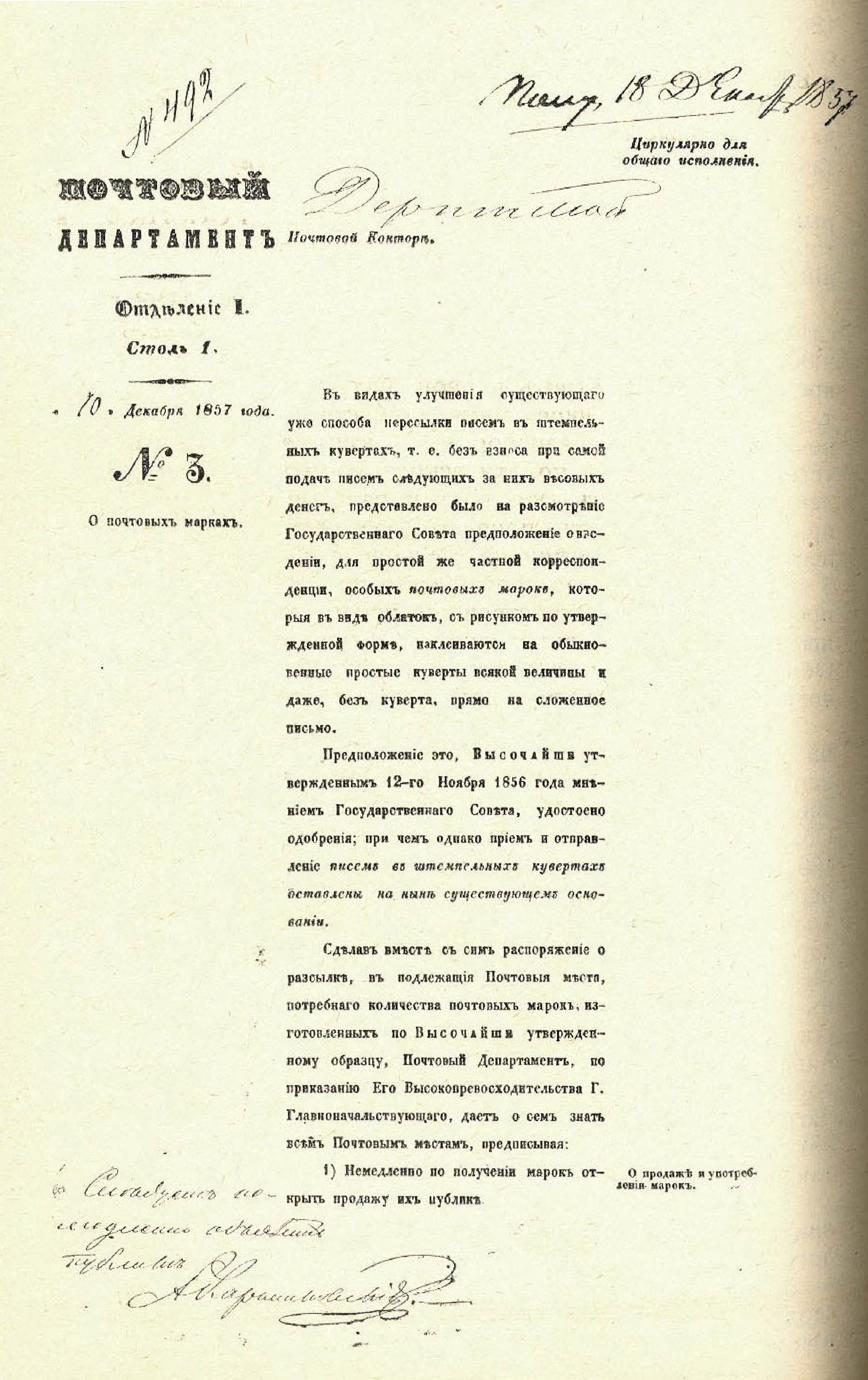
Circular No. 3 on postage stamps issued by the Russian Postal Department on 10 December 1857

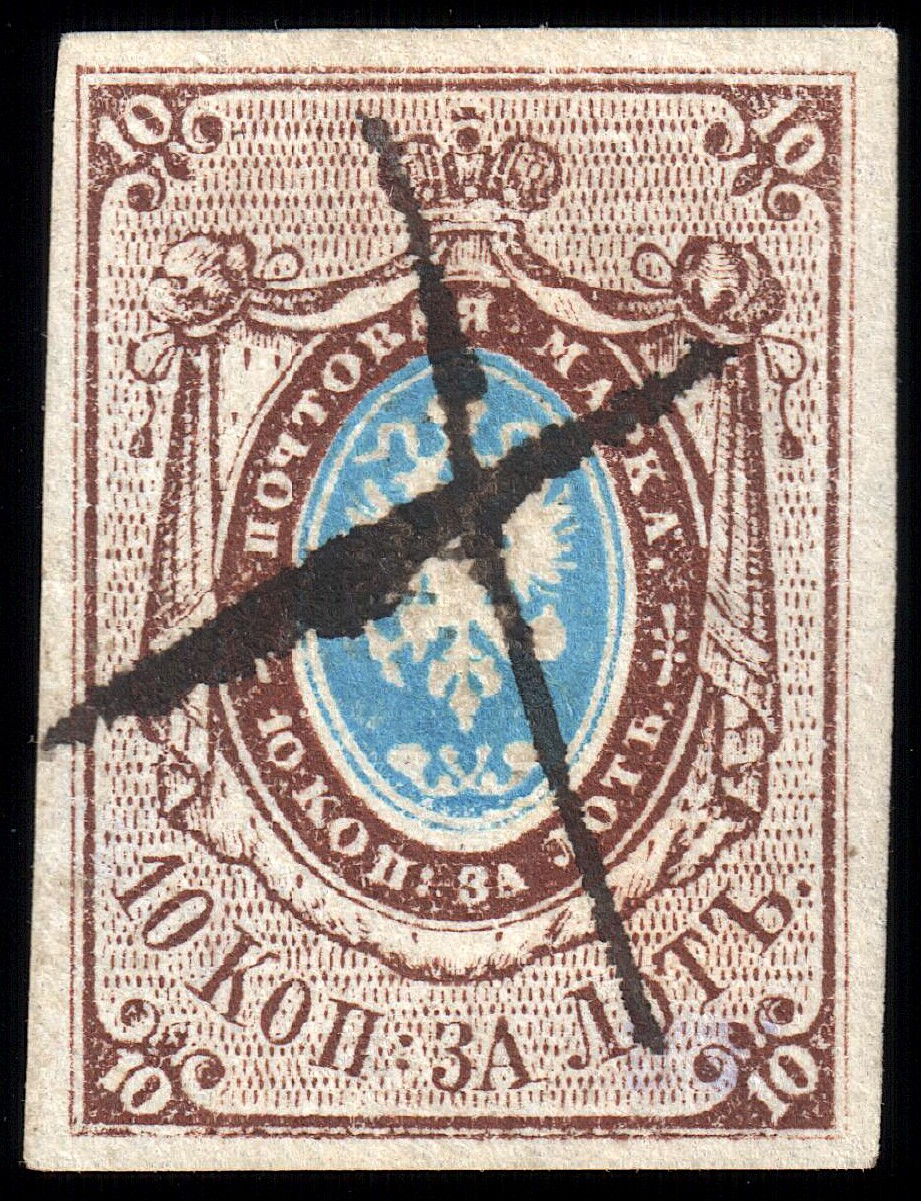
A pen-cancelled first Russian postage stamp

== Commemoration ==
Postal authorities of the Soviet Union and now Russia (Russian Post) repeatedly made issues of commemorative stamps, miniature sheets, postcards and other philatelic items. Stamp exhibitions and other memorable philatelic events have also been organised. Research on the history of the first stamps of the Russian Empire is a subject of numerous publications including newspaper and journal articles and books.

100th anniversary of the first Russian stamp, USSR, 1957

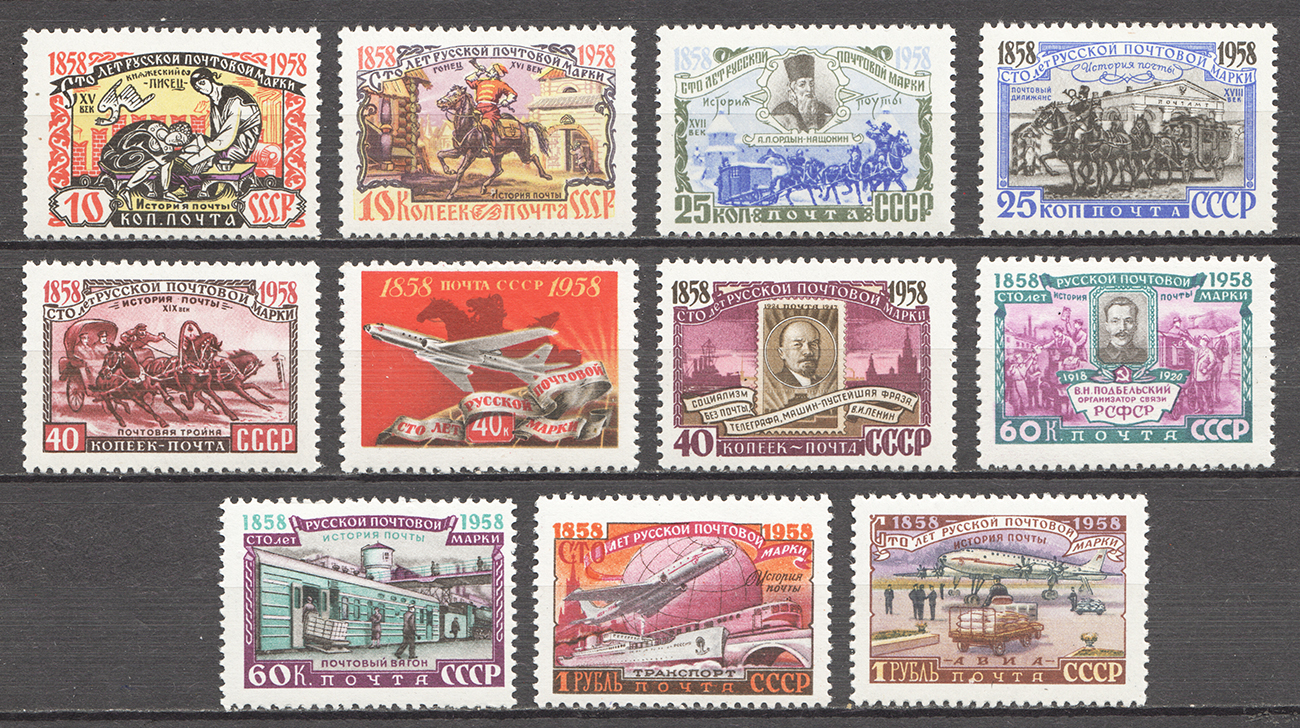
Full set of stamps with a postal history scenes

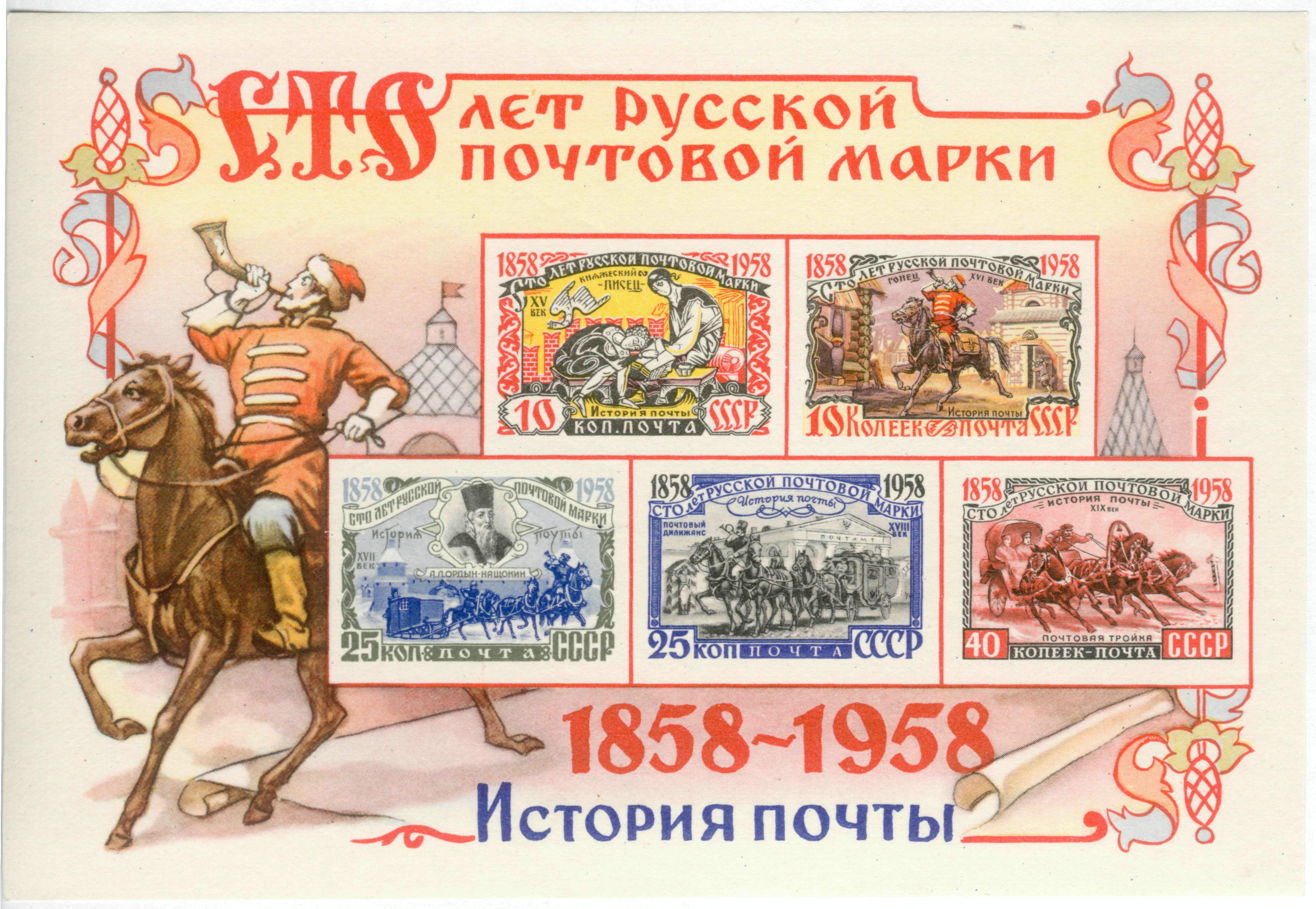
Miniature sheet with postal
history scenes

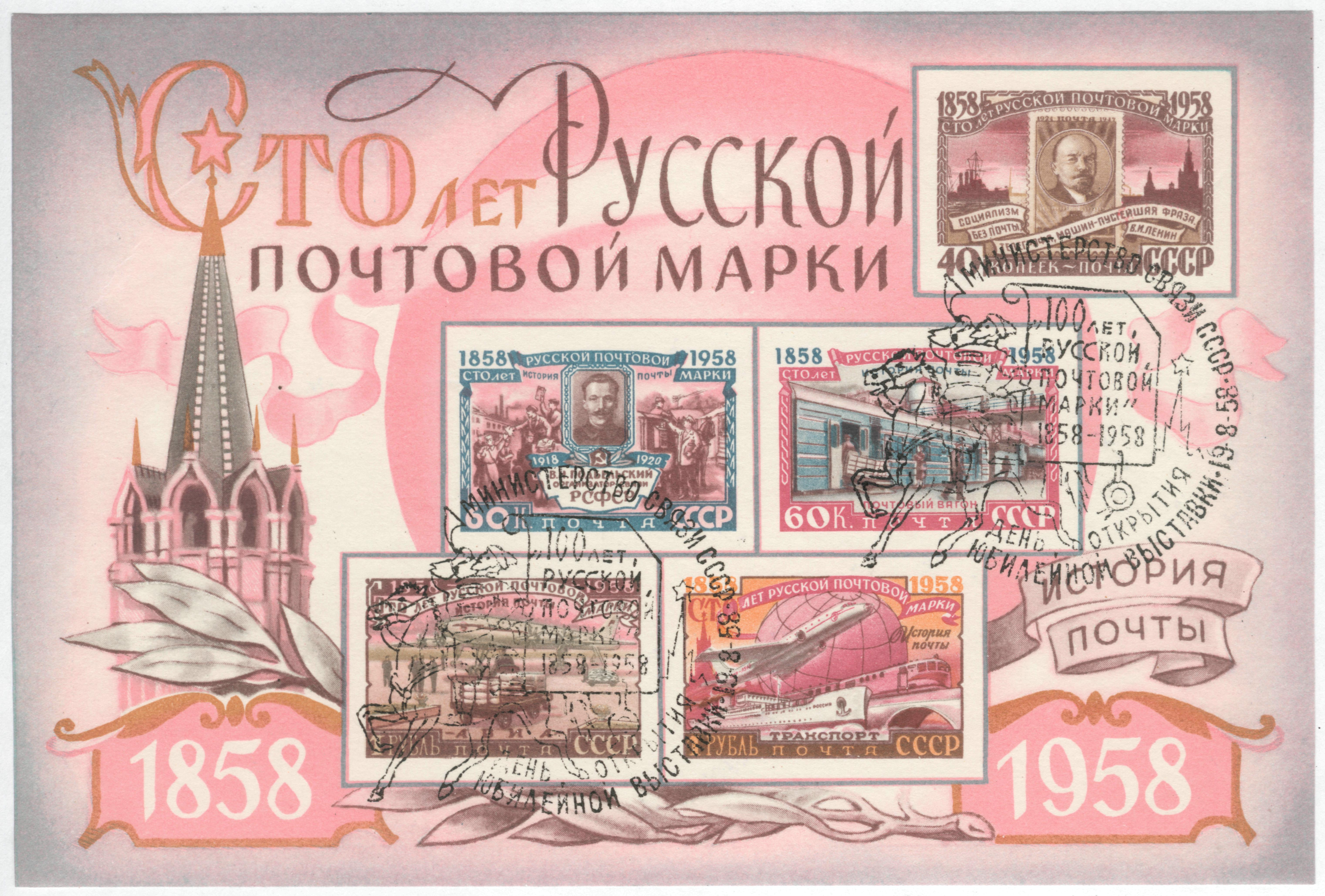
Miniature sheet on the Soviet
postal history
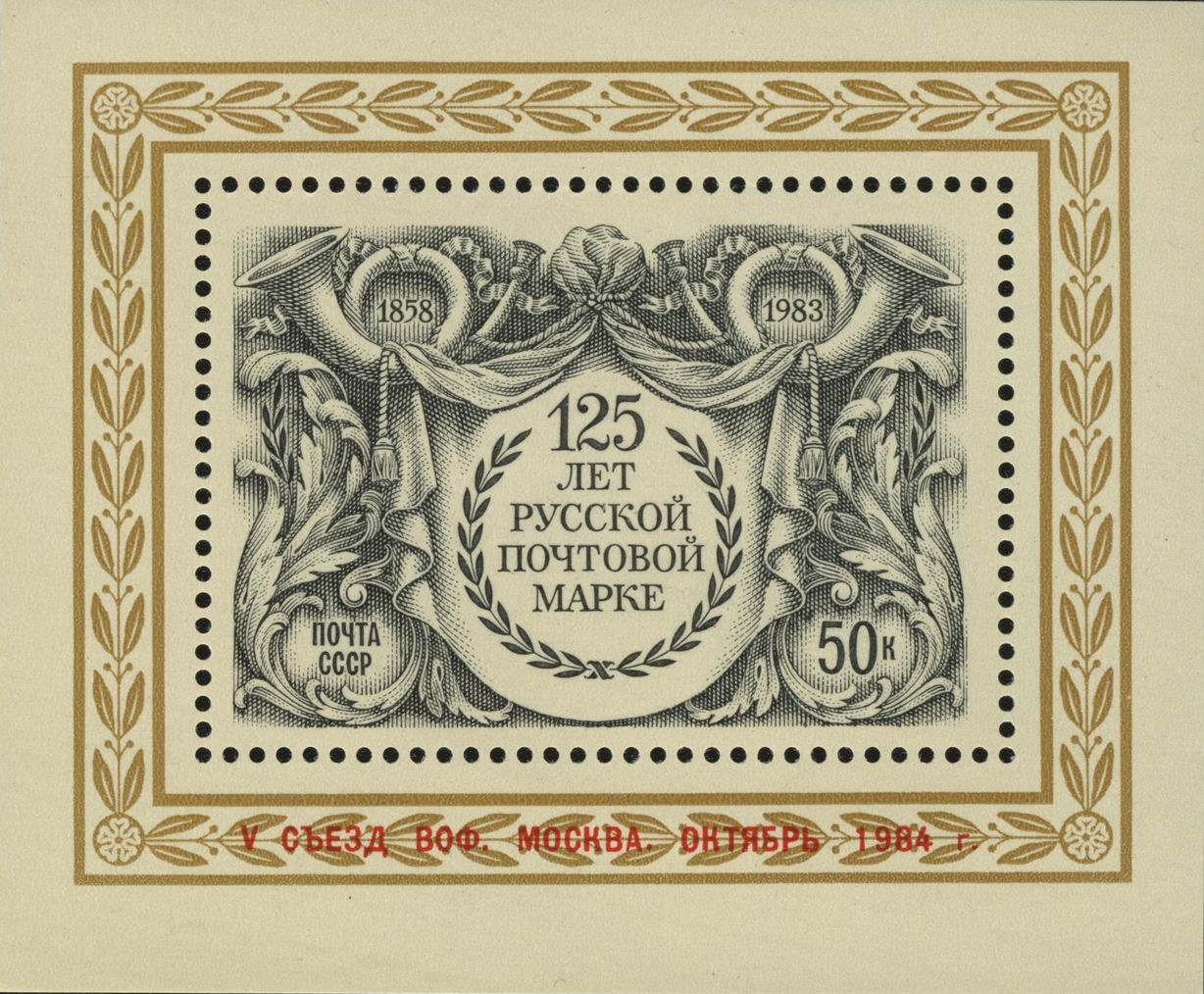
125th anniversary of the first Russian stamp, 1983 USSR miniature sheet overprinted in relation to the 5th Congress of the All-Union Society of Philatelists of 1984

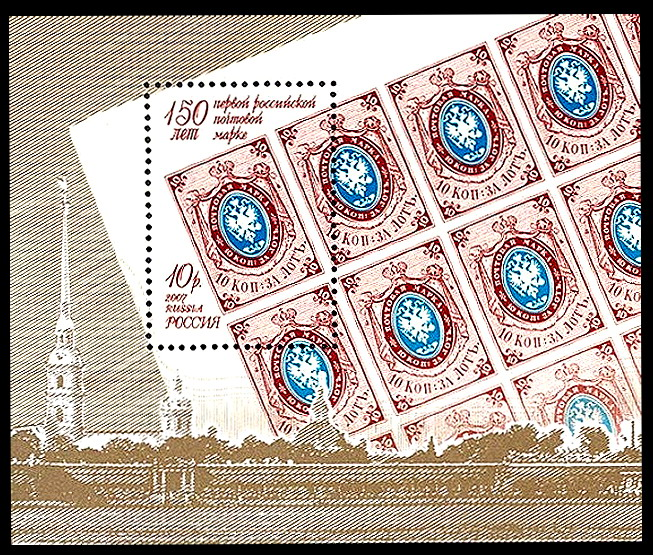
150th anniversary of the first Russian stamp, Russian Federation
miniature sheet, 2007

== Fakes and forgeries ==
Fakes begin with a genuine stamp, which is altered in some way to make it more valuable to stamp collectors. Sometimes only minor changes can affect the apparent valuation of a stamp. Genuine unused copies of this stamp are exceedingly rare, and there are only very few stamps known with original gum. About half of all used 1857 stamps have a pen cancel which in some cases is known to be removed.

Entire forgeries where the forger started from scratch and engraved a completely new plate exist. The resulting forgery is mostly a crude lithograph with no watermark showing a different background of badly drawn vertical lines, without the fine alternating lines made up of short strokes or dots in the originals.

== See also ==
- Definitive stamps of Russia
- First USSR stamps
- List of postage stamps
- Postage stamps and postal history of Russia
- Soviet and post-Soviet postage rates
- Soviet Union stamp catalogue
- Stamps of Russia
- Stamps of the Soviet Union
