= Definitive stamps of Russia =

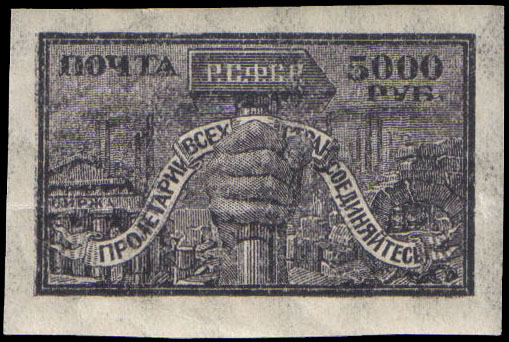
Stamp of the RSFSR 3rd definitive issue, 1922, bearing the communist slogan "Workers of the world, unite!"

Definitive stamps of Russia are the regular postage stamp issues produced in the Russian Empire and RSFSR between 1857 and 1923, and in the Russian Federation since 1992.

== Russian Empire ==
The Russian Empire started issuing definitive series of postage stamps since 10 December 1857 when the first Russian stamp went on sale. There were twenty definitive issues produced until 1917 as outlined in a table below.

| Issue No. | Dates | Stamp example |
|---|---|---|
| 1 | 10 December 1857 – March 1858 | |
| 2 | 19 September 1858 | |
| 4 (Note: The 3rd issue of the Russian Empire was a local stamp of August 1863 for internal mail in St. Petersburg and Moscow.) | 10 July 1864 | |
| 5 | June 1865 | |
| 6 | 20 August 1866 – 1875 | |
| 7 | 18 June – July 1875 | |
| 8 | 19 March 1879 | |
| 9 | 25 January 1884 | |
| 10 | March 1888 | |
| 11 | 2 May 1889 | |
| 12 | 14 December 1889 – 1892 | |
| 13 | 1902–1904 | |
| 14 | 1904 | |
| 15 | 1905 | |
| 16 | 1 June 1906 | |
| 17 | December 1908 – 1917 | |
| 19 (Note: The 18th issue of the Russian Empire was a series of 1913 commemorating the 300th anniversary of the Romanov dynasty.) | 1915 – 1917 | |
| 20 | 10 September 1916 – 1 January 1917 | |

== RSFSR ==
The first definitive series of the RSFSR was issued in 1921. It included five designs of new Soviet symbols such as agricultural labour, industrial labour, science and arts, hammer and sickle, and freed proletarian. The stamps had a minimum wording, Russian: Почта (Pochta (postage)) and the acronym Russian: РСФСР (RSFSR), imparting the Soviet messages solely via pictures.

Examples of stamps of the RSFSR 1st definitive issue, 1921

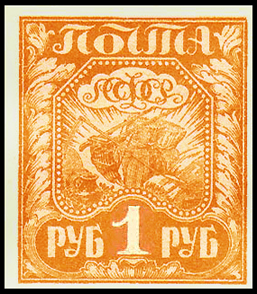
Symbols of agricultural labour

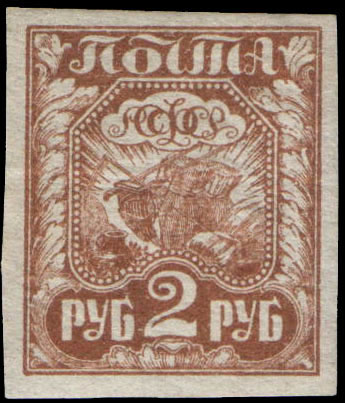
Symbols of agricultural labour

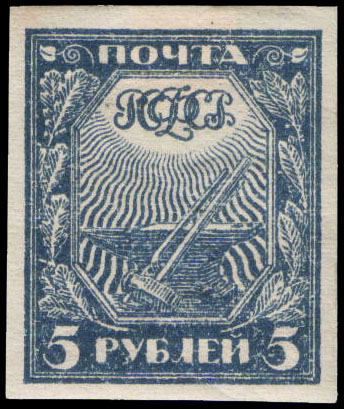
Symbols of industrial labour

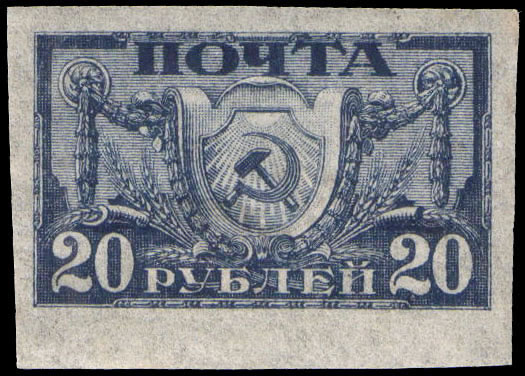
"Hammer and sickle" symbol

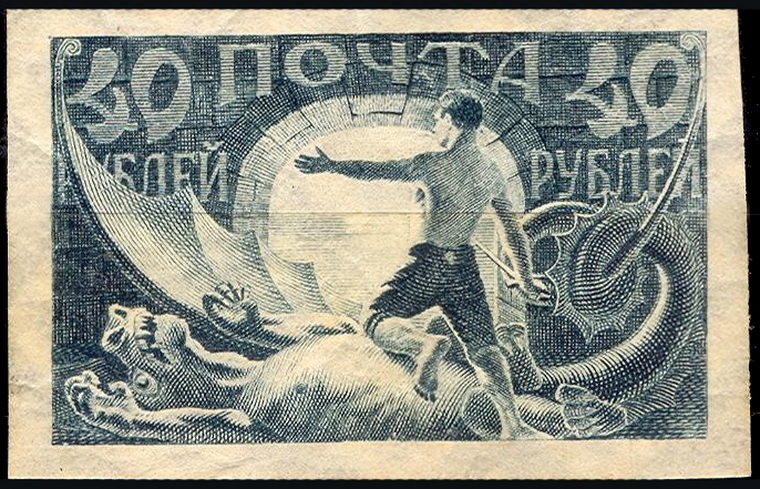
"Proletarian Freed" ("Russia New Triumphant" or "The Dragon Slayer")

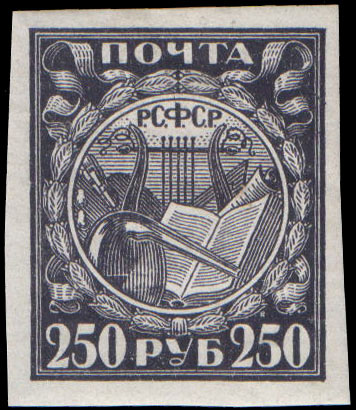
Symbols of science and arts

The first regular issue involved eleven different stamps of denominations ranging between 1- and 1,000 roubles. Among these, five stamps showed the agricultural-labour design, printed in different colours and with face values of 1-, 2-, 100-, 200-, and 300 roubles. The industrial-labour symbol was given in three denominations: 5-, 500-, and 1,000 roubles. The stamp for science-and-arts appeared only once. To a certain degree, designs of the series, focusing more on agriculture and industry, were in conformity with the spirit of the government's New Economic Policy of 1921 aimed at recovering the RSFSR economy. They also followed the same vogue that could be found in Soviet poster art in 1921, when the Soviet government, "having secured its own position, turns to problems of peaceful social and economic development (economic and cultural themes move rapidly to the fore)."

Reflecting new political goals, RSFSR postage stamps provided visual messages of the values and major social groups within Soviet society. Portraying the three social groups, the RSFSR's final definitive issues in 1922 and 1923 depicted the worker, the soldier, and the peasant that constituted the Soviet state. These were stylistic representations in the form of classical busts resembling portraits of monarchs and other heads of state on stamps of other countries.

Examples of stamps of the RSFSR 4th definitive issue, 1922

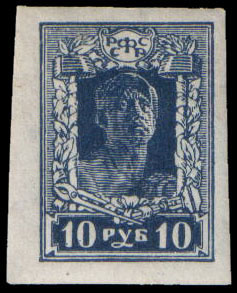

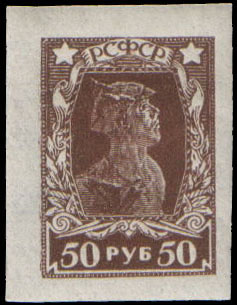

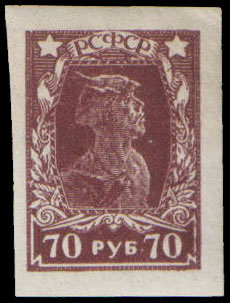

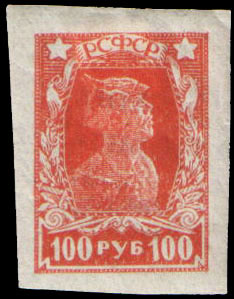

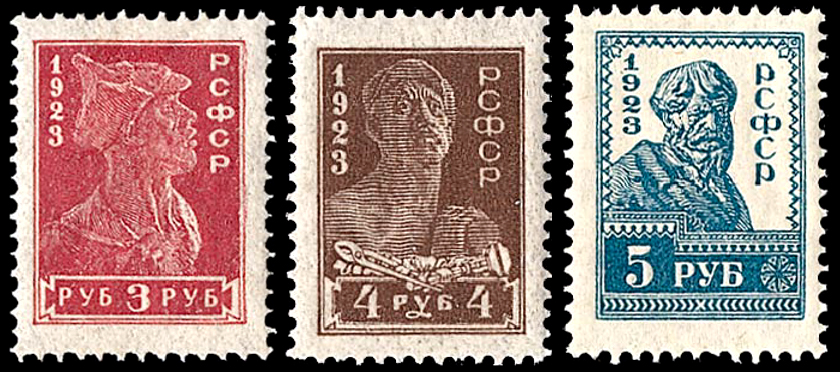
Stamps of the 4th definitive issue of the RSFSR, 1923

Replacing the portraits of the tsars, depiction of the three social groups was on purpose, because the Soviet government "specifically decided to create images which would symbolise the idea of worker-peasant power." The sculptor Ivan Shadr was author of these images. Designing the busts, he created the worker first, then the Red Army soldier. These two stamps appeared in December 1922. The stamp showing the bust of the peasant came out five months later, in May 1923. Among the eleven denominations of the fourth definitive issue, the worker appeared on stamps three times, the soldier six times, and the peasant showed up on two stamps.

The Soviet Russia definitive issues are listed in the following table:

| Issue No. | Dates | CPA Catalogue No. |
|---|---|---|
| 1 | 10 August 1921 | 3–7 |
| 2 (1) (Note: Number varies depending on catalogue.) | 25 August – 9 September 1921 | 8–13 |
| auxiliary | 10 February 1922 | 14–23 |
| 3 (2) (Note: Number varies depending on catalogue.) | 4 March – April 1922 | 38–42 |
| auxiliary | 17 March – April 1922 | 24–24Б |
| auxiliary | 1 November 1922 | 49 |
| auxiliary | 5 December 1922 – March 1923 | 60–72 |
| 4 (3) (Note: Number varies depending on catalogue.) | December 1922 – 15 August 1923 | 73–85 |

== Soviet Union ==
Between 1923 and 1992, definitive stamps were issued by the USSR postal administration. There were 13 definitive issues of the Soviet Union.

== Russian Federation ==
In 1992–2010, the Russian Federation produced six issues of definitive stamps. The first post-Soviet issue appeared in February 1992. It included two stamps with face values of 20- and 30 kopecks that depicted Saint George and the Millennium of Russia monument. In the early and mid 1990s, this definitive series of stamps continuously expanded due to hyperinflation and a corresponding change in postal rates. Many stamps were reissued using the same design but with a modified denomination. For example, the face value of the stamp with the Golden Gate in Vladimir increased from 10 kopecks to 150 roubles, that is, by 1500 times. The maximum stamp denomination reached 5,000 roubles.

First stamps of the Russian Federation 1st definitive issue, 1992

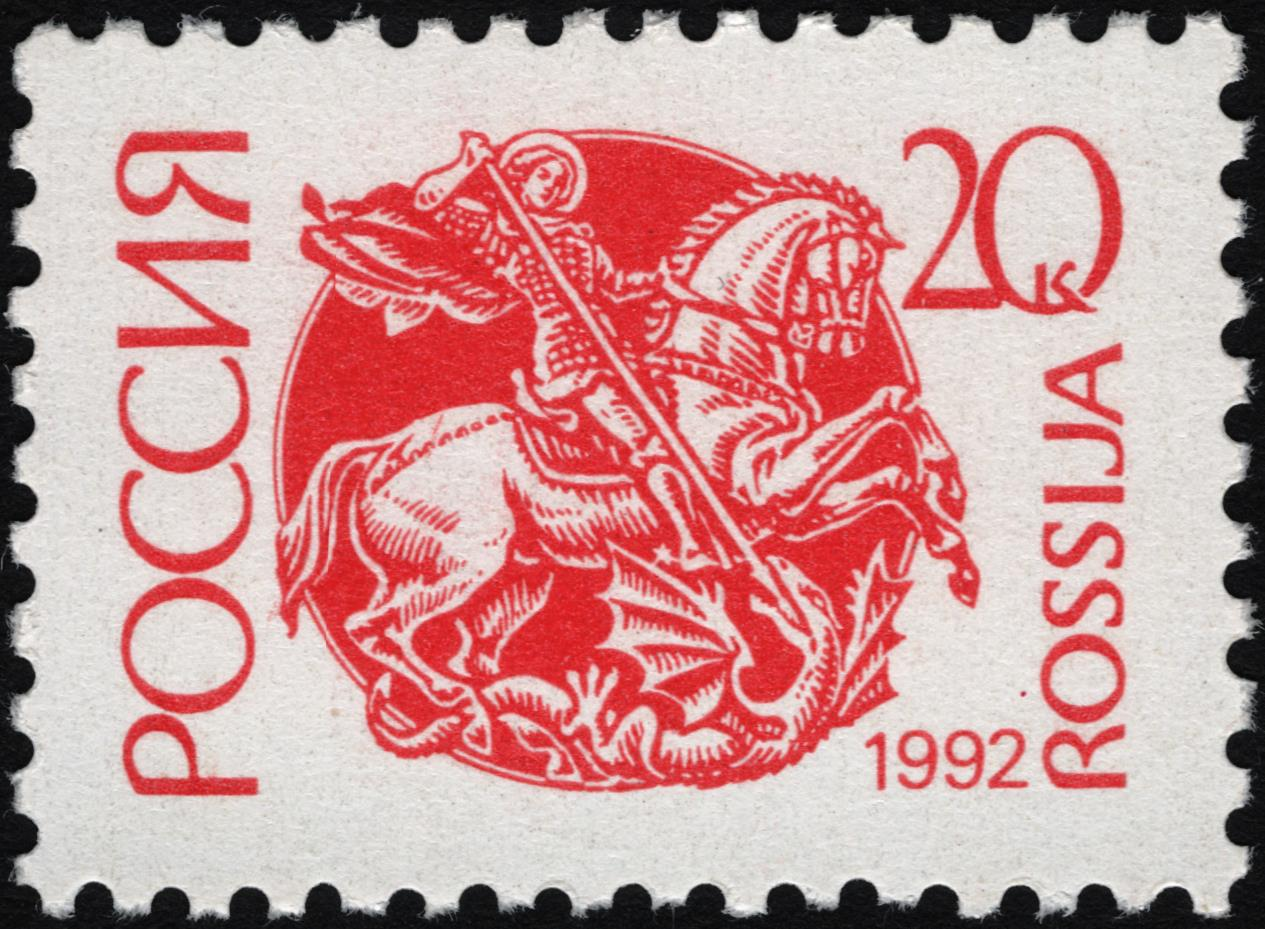
Saint George

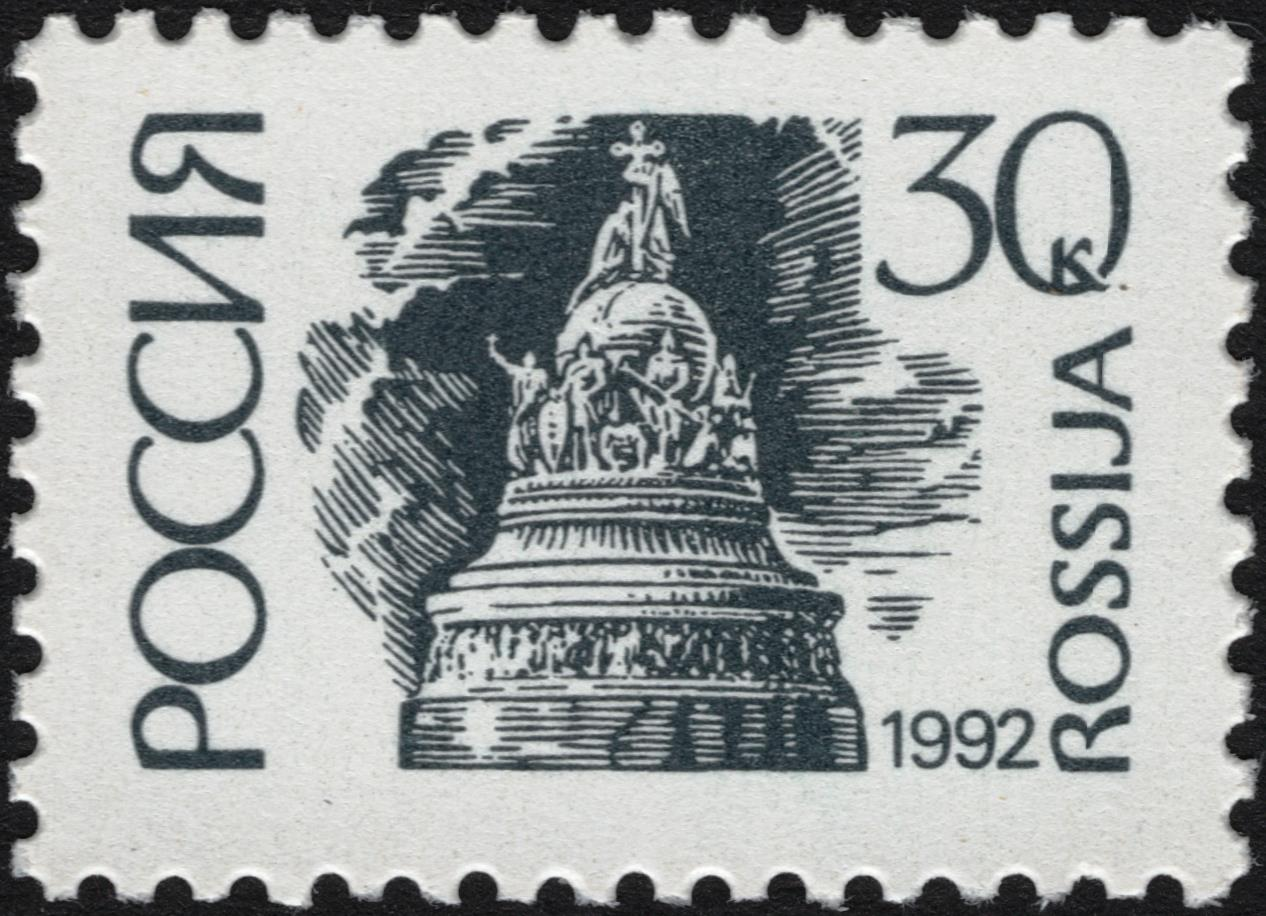
Millennium of Russia monument

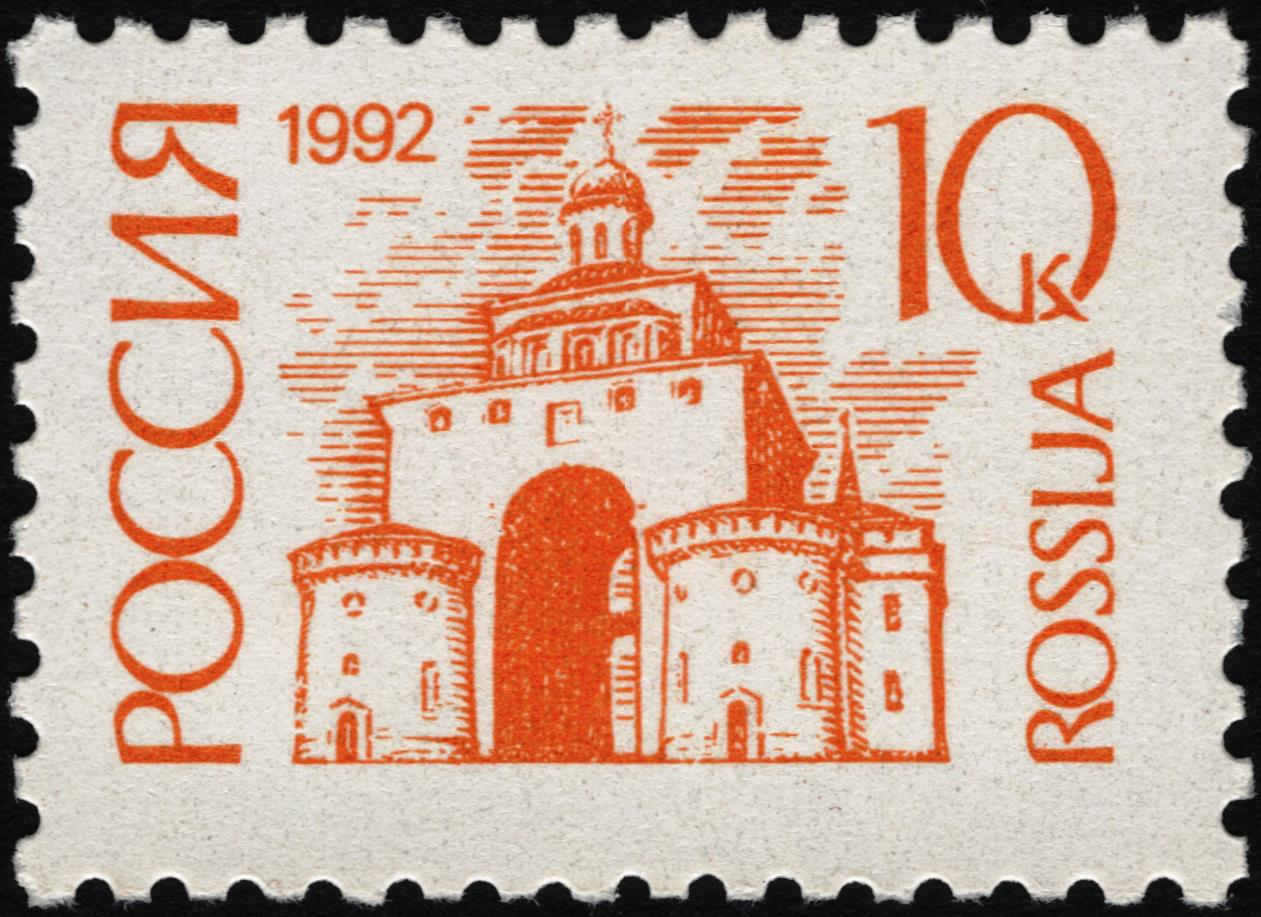
Golden Gate, Vladimir
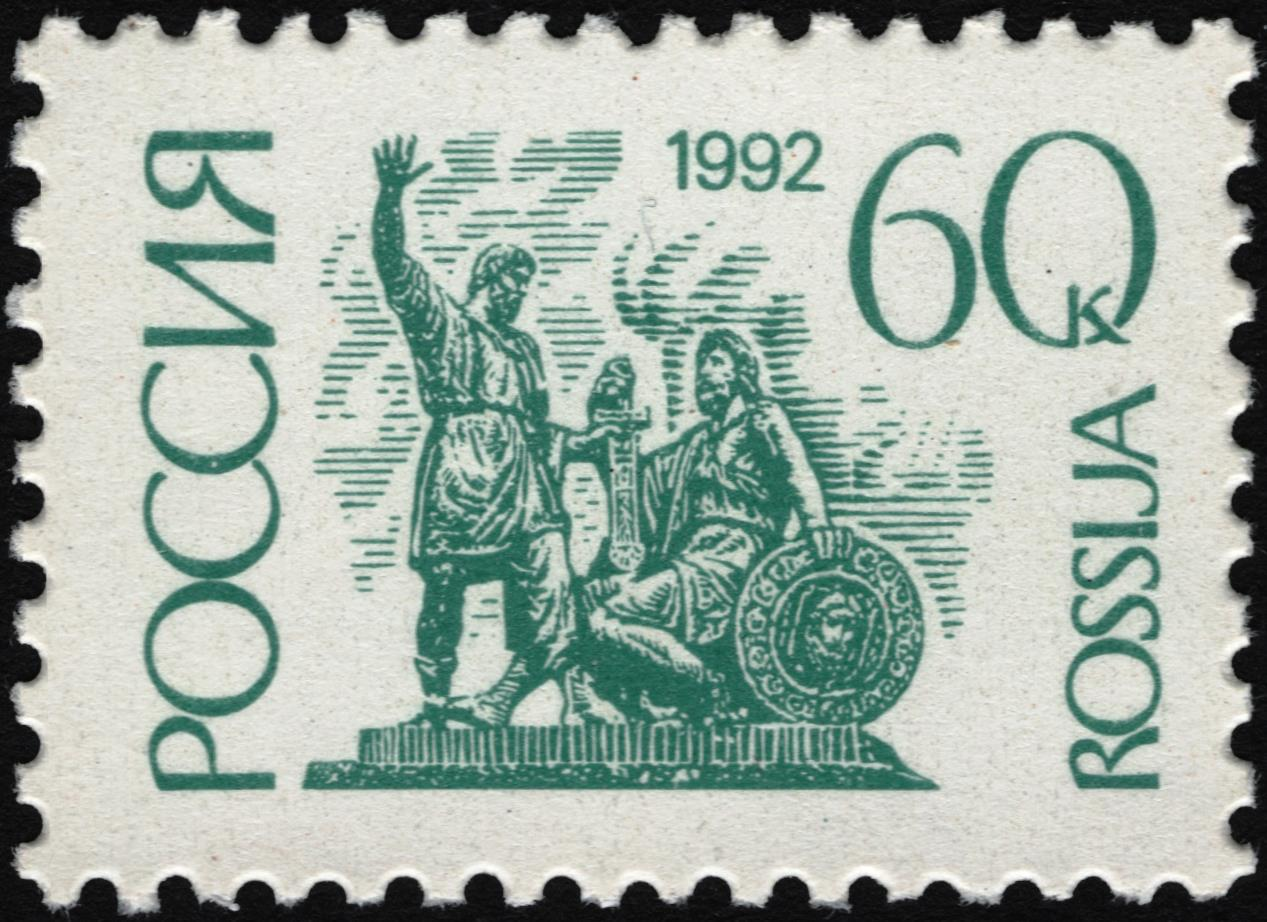
Monument to Minin and Pozharsky

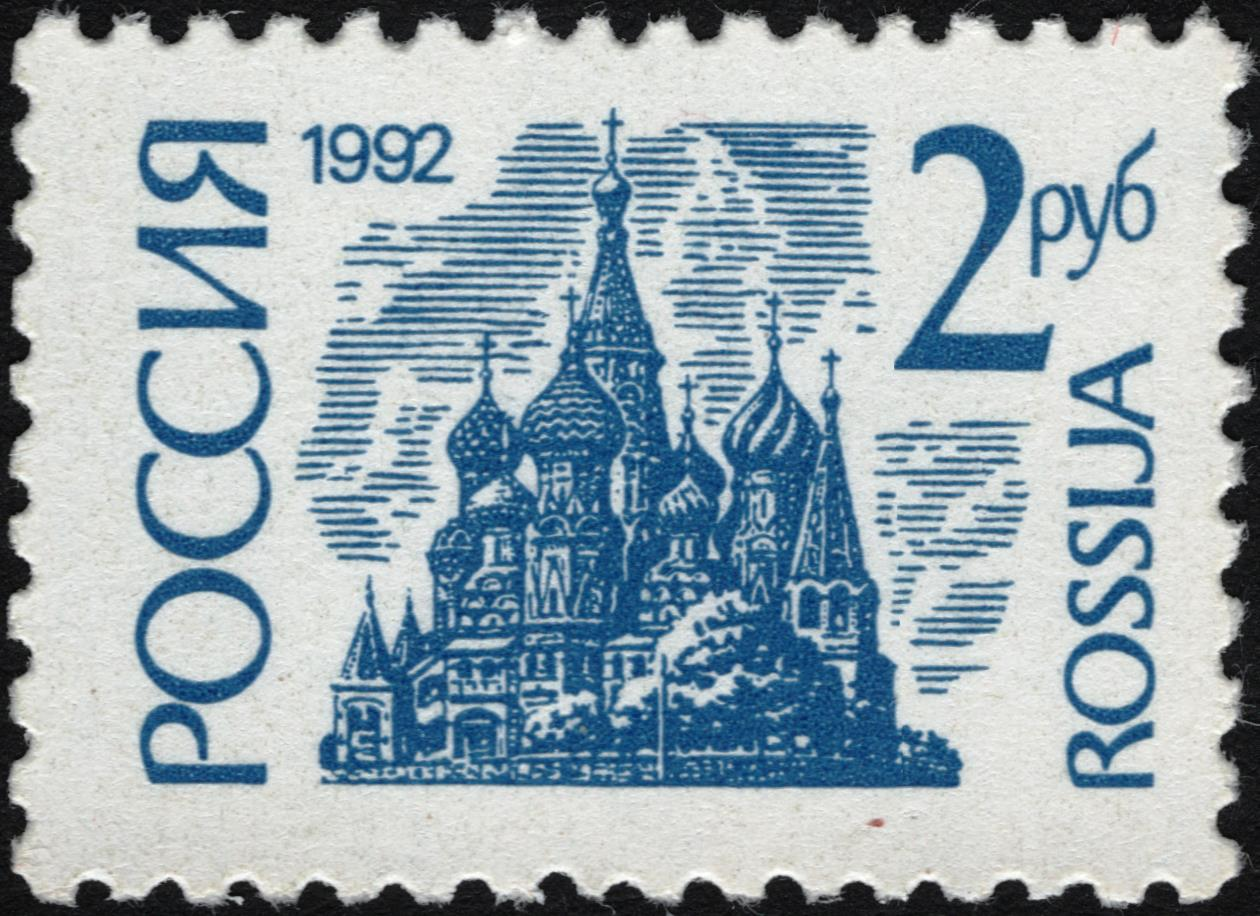
Saint Basil's Cathedral

The second and third issues of definitive stamps came out in 1997–1999. Landscape orientation of stamps was replaced with portrait one. The second series included 12 denominations, and the third one had 15 denominations. By design, stamps of two issues were not different from each other. The need for the third issue was caused by a 1,000-fold of the Russian rouble redenomination followed by withdrawal of the second definitive issue in 1998. The third issue repeated the second one (except the abolished face value of 75 kopecks) and supplemented them with four other denominations. The latter included the denominations of 50- and 100 roubles that did not have practical application.

Examples of used stamps of the Russian Federation 3rd definitive issue, 1998

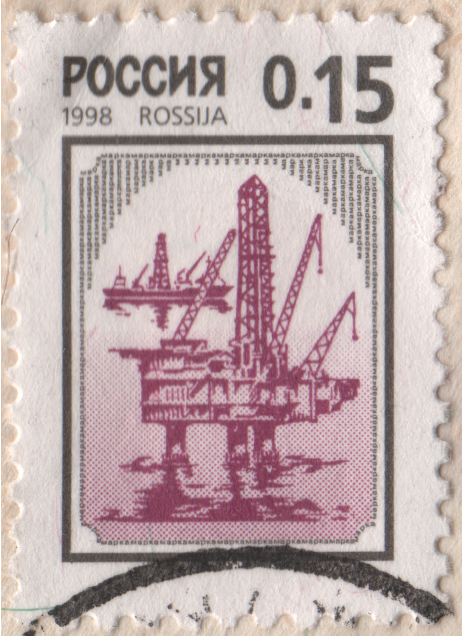

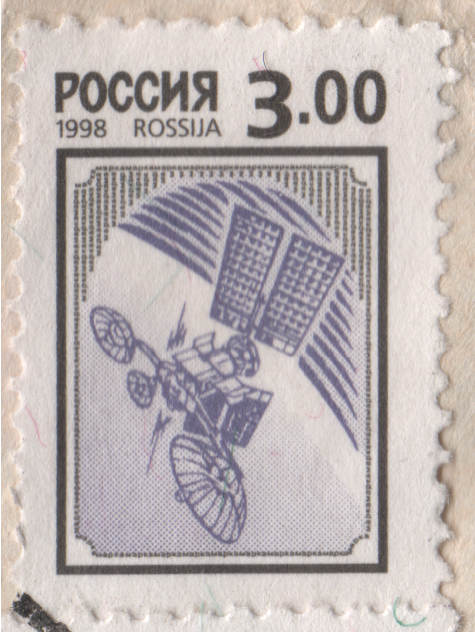

The fourth series of 2002–2003 was different from the previous issues because of introduction of self-adhesive stamps. The new stamp motives included palaces and parks of Russia. Number of denominations was reduced to nine, from 1- to 10 roubles. The problem of fractional postal rates was solved by using the remaining stamps of the third issue.

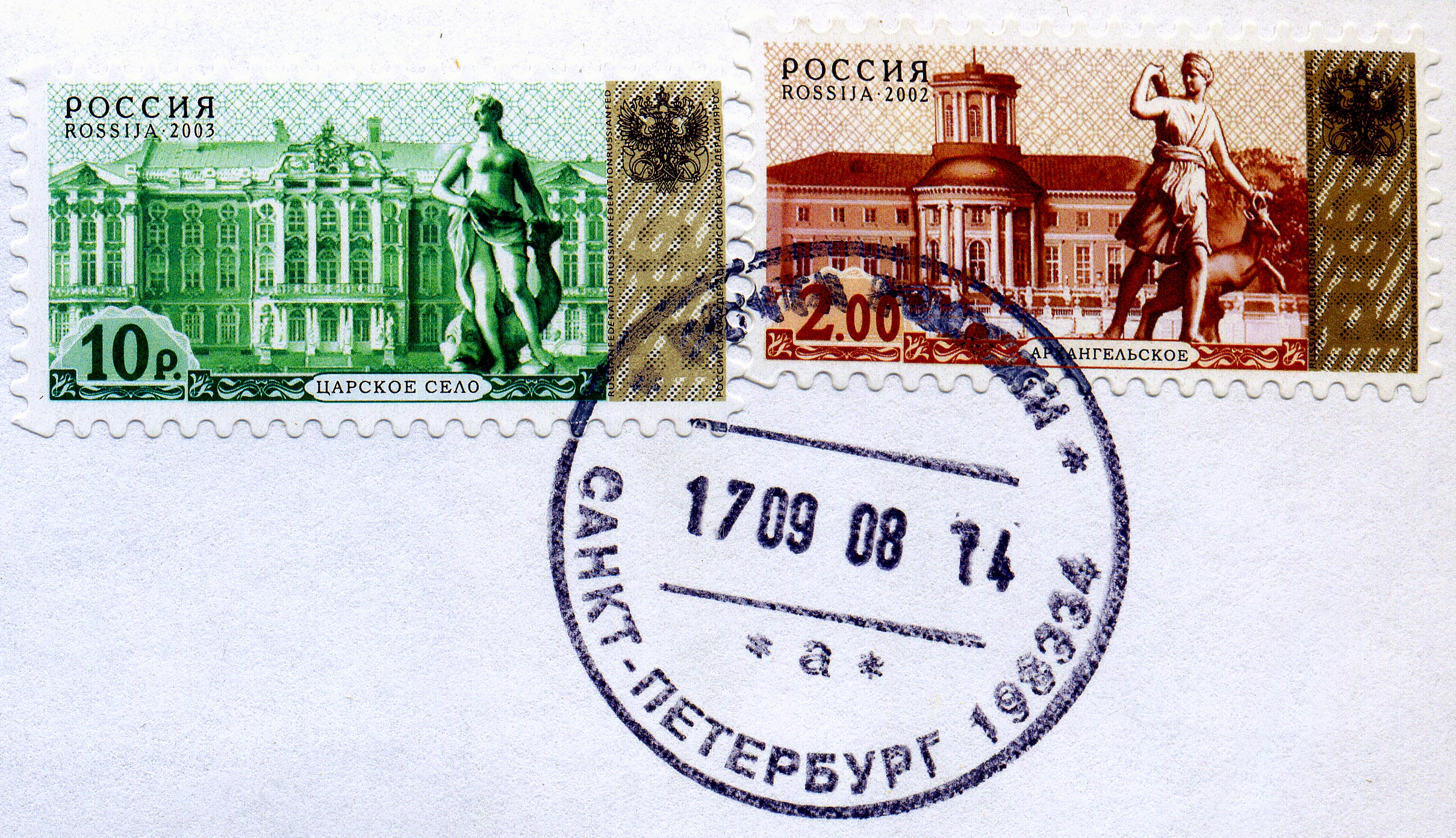
Examples of used stamps of the Russian Federation 4th definitive issue, 2002. Postmark of St. Petersburg

Stamps of the fifth, "animalistic" issue of 2008 were not self-adhesive and went back to standard size. Number of denominations again increased to 15, with certain fractional denominations (15, 25, and 30 kopecks) being of dubious practical value. Maximum stamp denomination increased to 25 roubles.

Examples of stamps of the Russian Federation 5th definitive issue, 2008

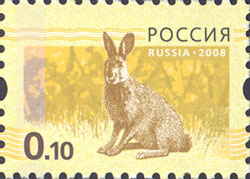

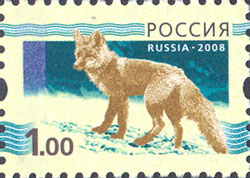

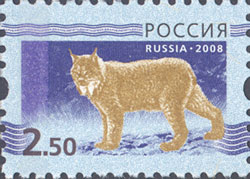
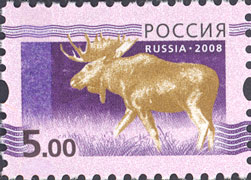

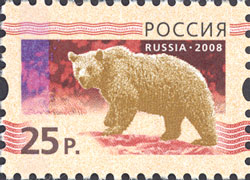

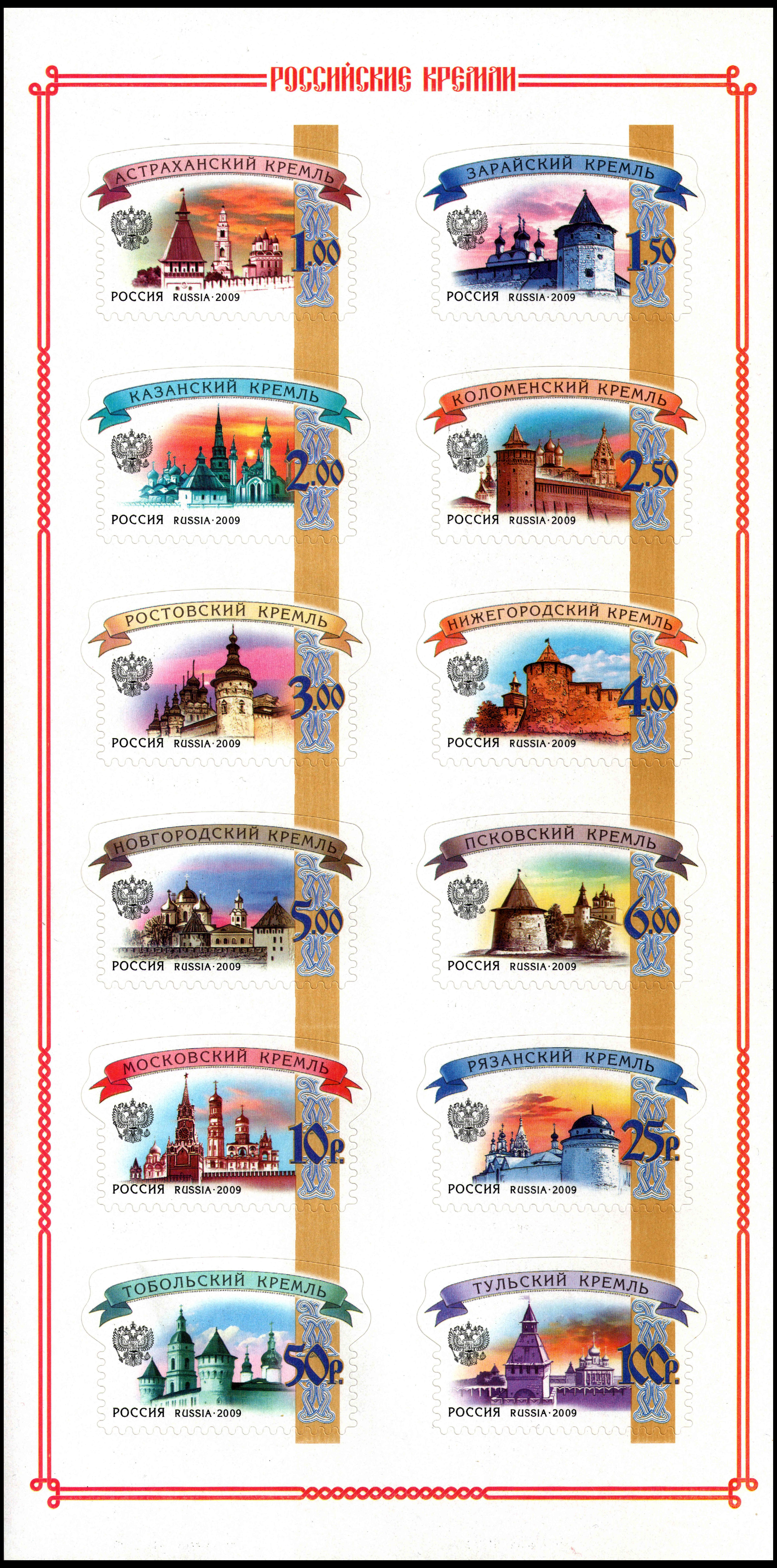
Russian Kremlins. Sheetlet of the 6th definitive issue of the Russian Federation, 2009

The sixth series of 2009, "Russian Kremlins", represented a return to the self-adhesive stamps with most used denominations. The difference from the fourth issue, of a close topic, was the expansion of denominations up to 100 roubles as well as the availability of additional security features to protect against counterfeiting.

Definitive issues of the Russian Federation are summarised in a table below:

| Issue No. | Dates | CPA Catalogue No. | Denominations |
|---|---|---|---|
| 1 | 26 February 1992 – 30 April 1992; 20 April 1992; 26 May 1992; 25 June 1992; 11 August 1992; 10 September 1992; 25 December 1992; 25 January 1993; 4 June 1993; 30 December 1993; 26 January 1995; 21 February 1995; 22 June 1999 | 6–7; 12–14; 19–21; 32–34; 41–43; 47–49; 59–62; 68–69; 94–95; 138–139; 195; 199–202; 518 | 20- and 30 kopecks; 10- and 60 kopecks, 2 roubles 10-, 25-, and 100 roubles 1-, 1 1/2-, and 5 roubles 50-, 55-, and 80 kopecks 15- and 25 kopecks, 3 roubles 15-, 50-, 250-, and 500 roubles 45- and 75 roubles 4- and 6 roubles 150- and 300 roubles 1,000 roubles 750-, 1,500=, 2,500=, and 5,000 roubles 1.20-ruble surcharge on 5000 roubles |
| 2 | 31 March 1997 – 10 June 1997 | 341–345; 347–353 | 500-, 750-, 1,000-, 1,500-, 2,500 roubles 100-, 150-, 250-, 300-, 2,000-, 3,000-, and 5,000 roubles |
| 3 | 1 January 1998 – 26 October 1999; 24 January 2001 | 407–417 653–656 | 10, 15, 25, 30 & 50 kopecks, 1, 1.5, 2, 2.5, 3 & 5 rubles 10, 25, 50 & 100 rubles |
| 4 | 16 December 2002 – 15 April 2004; 5 December 2003 | 813–817 898–901 | 2-, 2 1/2-, 3-, 4-, and 5 roubles 1-, 1 1/2-, 6-, and 10 roubles |
| 5 | 29 August 2008 | 1250–1264 | 10-, 15-, 25-, 30=, and 50 kopecks, 1, 1 1/2-, 2-, 2 1/2-, 3-, 4-, 5-, 6-, 10-, and 25 roubles |
| 6 | 1 October 2009 | 1360–1371 | 1-, 1 1/2-, 2-, 2 1/2-, 3-, 4-, 5-, 6-, 10-, 25-, 50,- and 100 roubles |

== See also ==
- 70r Red Army Soldier error
- Definitive stamp
- Definitive stamps of the Soviet Union
- First stamp of the Russian Empire
- First USSR stamps
- Gold Standard issue
- Leniniana (philately)
- List of postage stamps
- Postage stamps and postal history of Russia
- Soviet and post-Soviet postage rates
- Soviet Union stamp catalogue
- Stamps of the Soviet Union
