= Georgy Pashkov =

Russian painter (1886–1925)

Georgy Pavlovich Pashkov
- Гео́ргий Па́влович Пашко́в
- Born: 1886; Russian Empire
- Died: 1925 (aged 38–39); USSR
- Education: Stroganov Art School, Moscow
- Known for: Interior design, graphics, painting
- Notable work: decoration of the Feodorovsky Cathedral, first USSR stamps
- Awards: Court Artist
- Patrons: House of Romanov

Georgy Pavlovich Pashkov (Russian: Гео́ргий Па́влович Пашко́в; 1886–1925) was a Russian artist known for his work in interior design, painting and graphics. He designed the first postage stamps of the Soviet Union in 1923.

== Biography ==
Georgy Pashkov was born in 1886. The Pashkov family, a family of iconographers in Moscow, had a high reputation for decades and had the patronage of the Imperial family.

Georgy Pashkov and his brothers Pavel and Nikolai graduated from the Stroganov Art School and became successful Moscow artists. They were appreciated as decorators. The Pashkov brothers participated in a number of important decorating projects supported by the Russian Royal Family. In 1912, Georgy Pashkov with his brother Nikolai decorated the lower church of the Feodorovsky Imperial Cathedral in Tsarskoye Selo. In 1914, they also painted frescos in the Church of the Icon of the Mother of God Joy to All the Afflicted for the Community of the Sisters of Charity of the Red Cross in Tsarskoye Selo. For this work, they received the honorary title of Court Artists.

Another field of the Pashkovs' artistic activity was commercial advertising. In particular, Georgy Pashkov created a significant number of advertising posters in the pre-World War I times.

Posters by Georgy Pashkov, 1914–1917

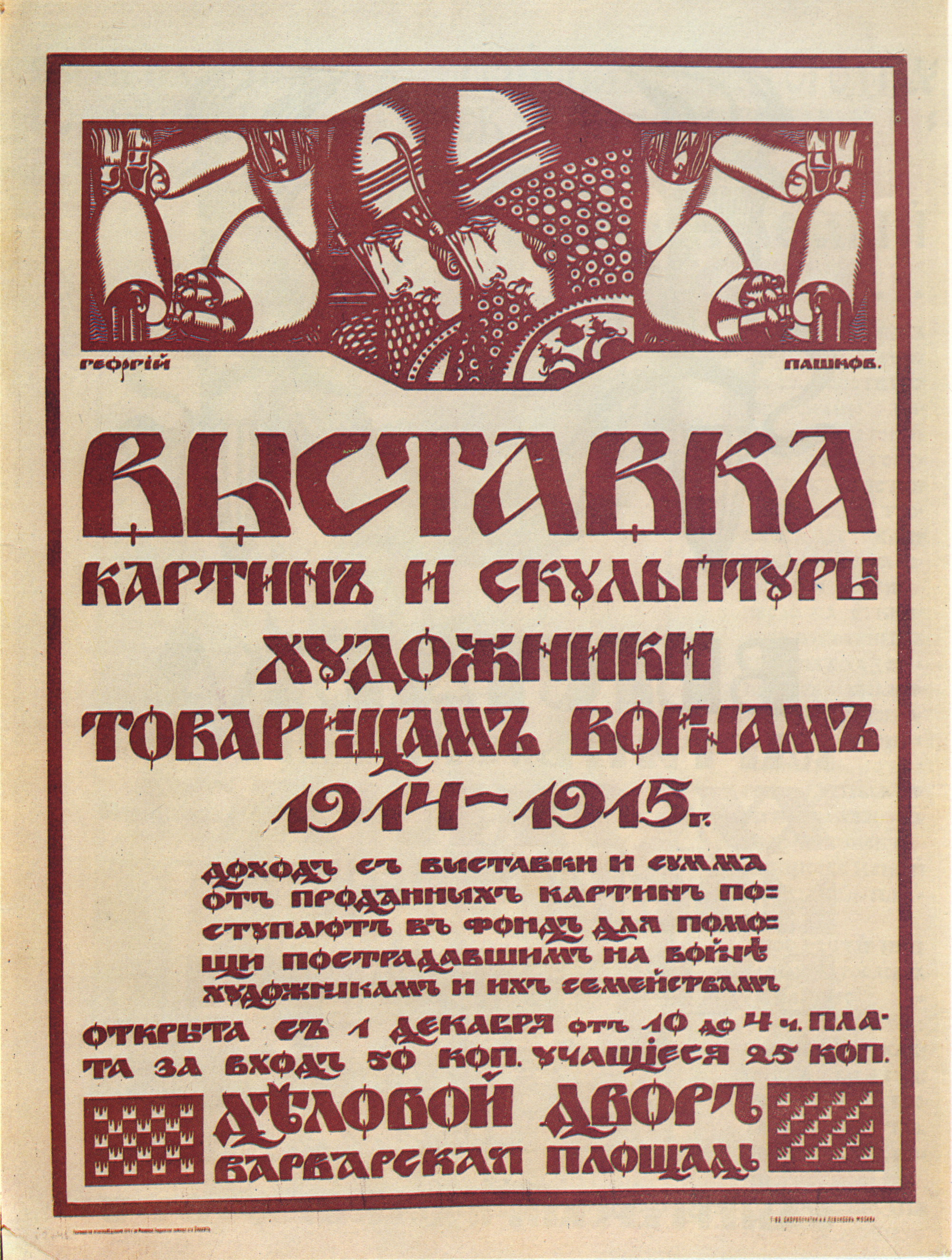
Art Exhibition

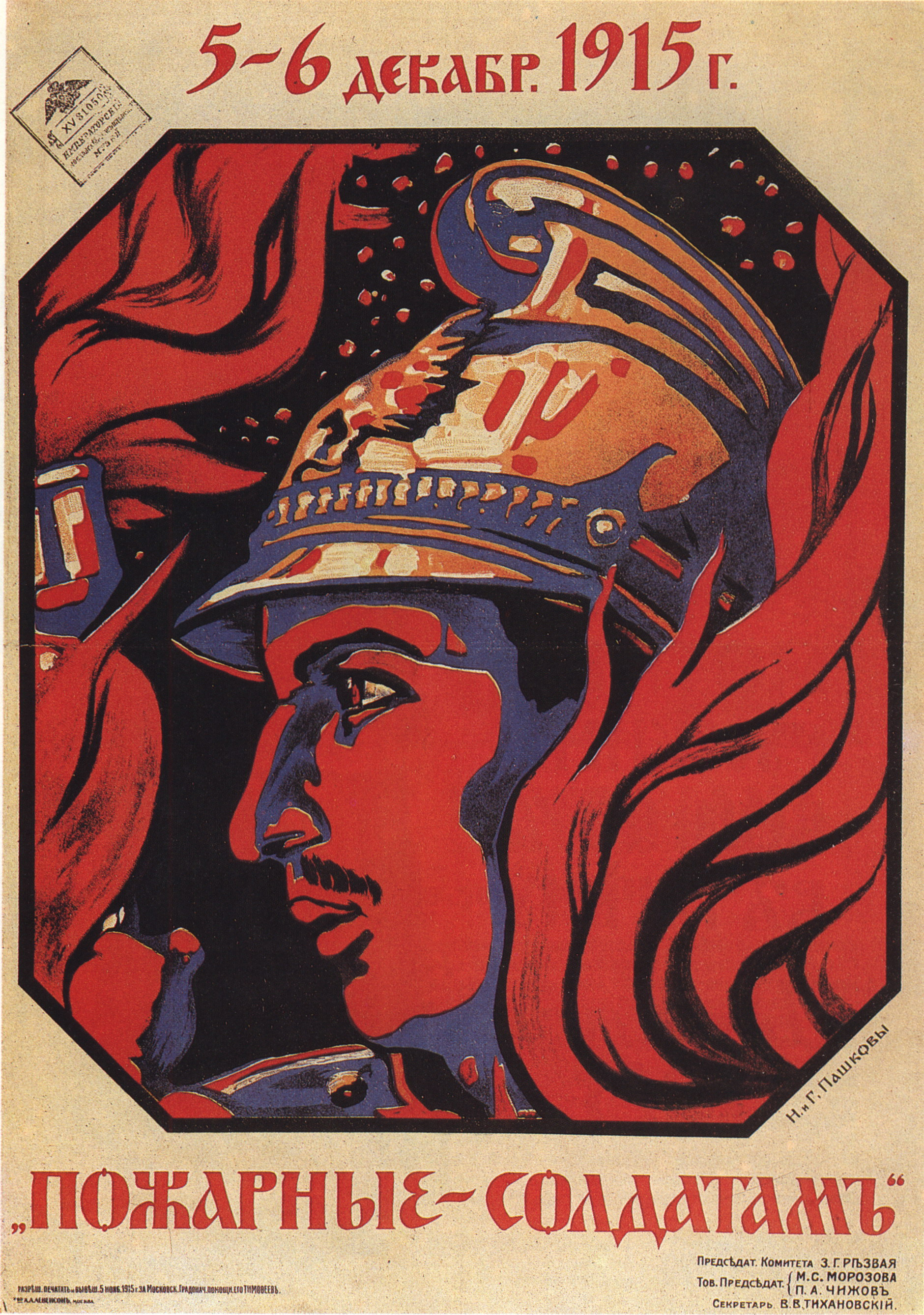
From Firemen to Soldiers

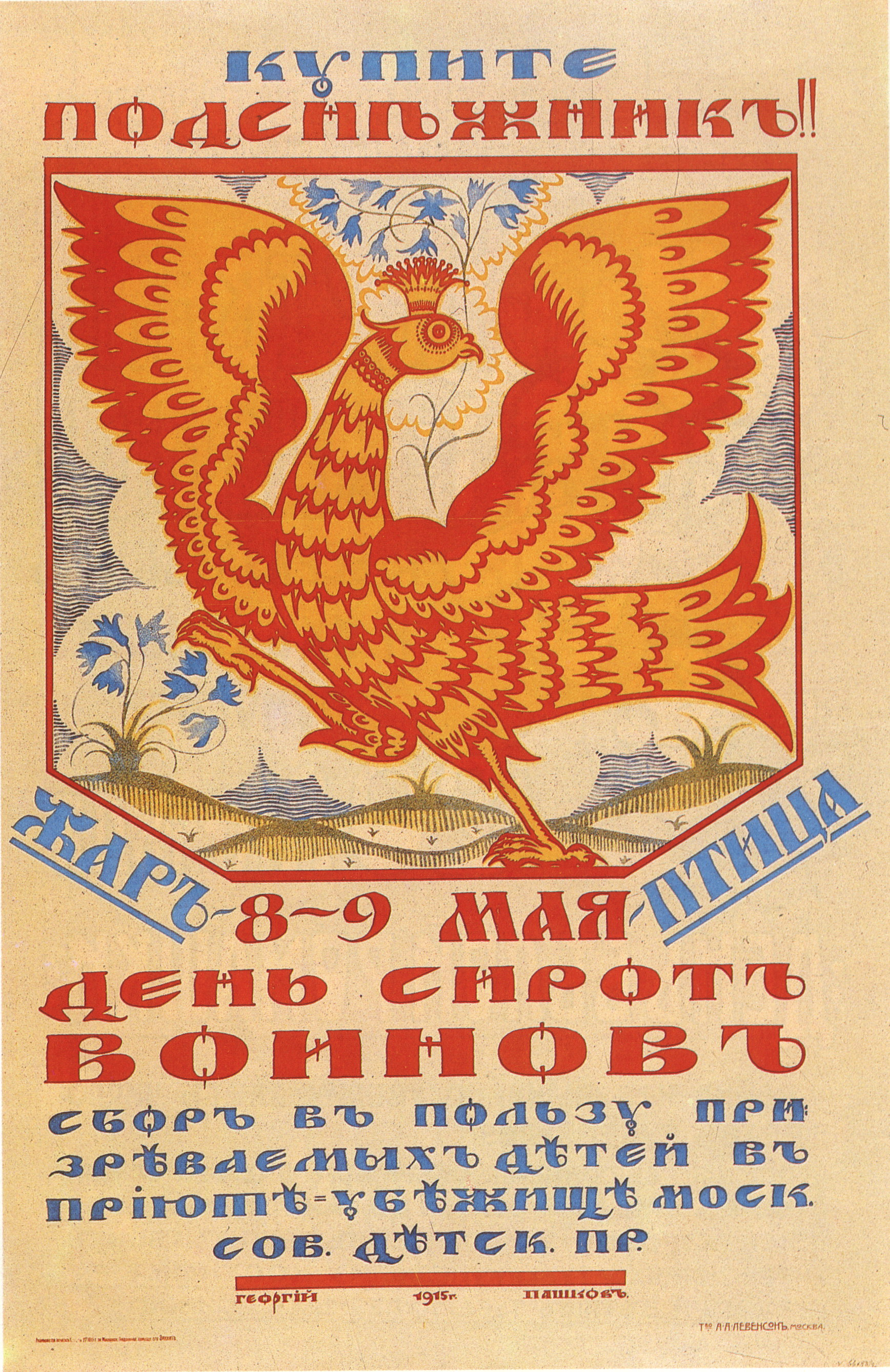
Warriors' Orphans Day

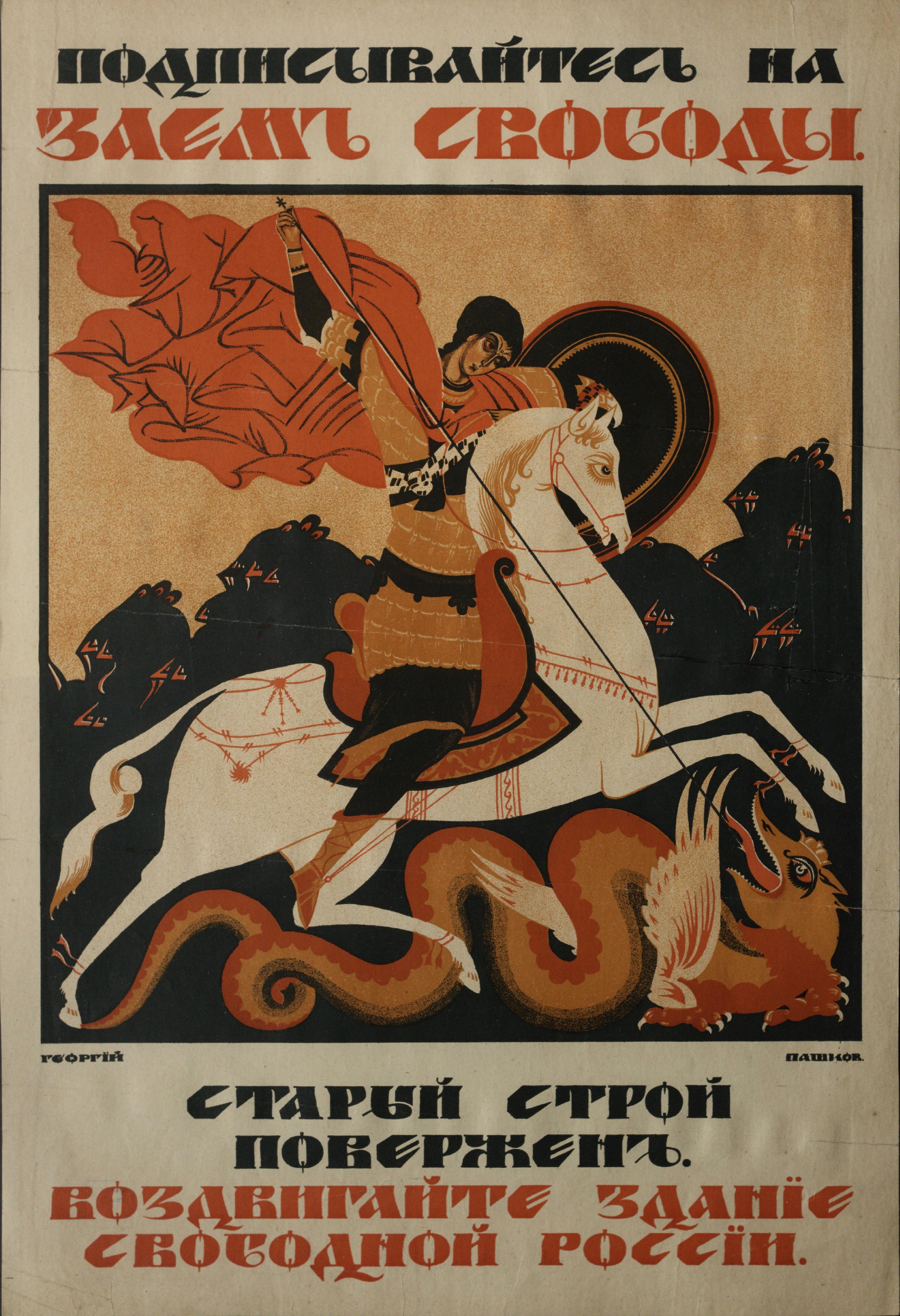
The Freedom Loan

== Postage stamps ==
In 1923, Georgy Pashkov created the design of the first USSR stamps (First All-Russia Agricultural Exhibition issue).

First USSR stamps by Georgy Pashkov, 1923

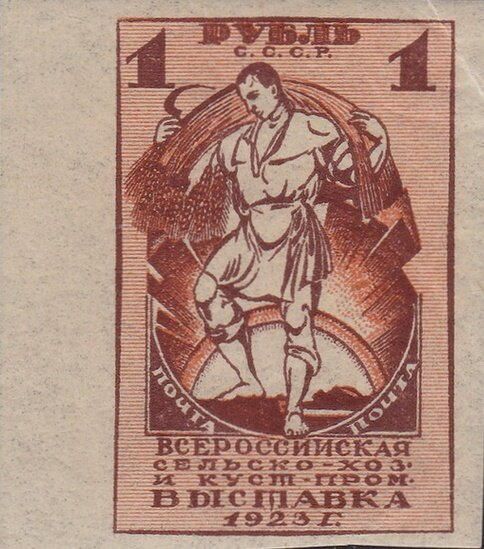
Reaper

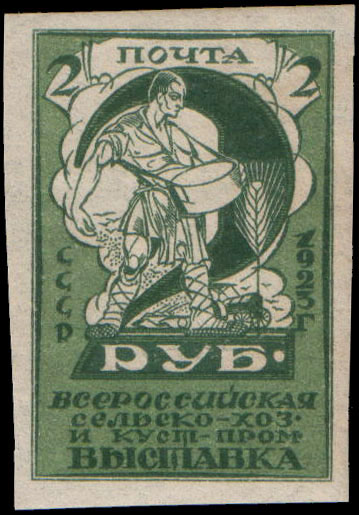
Sower

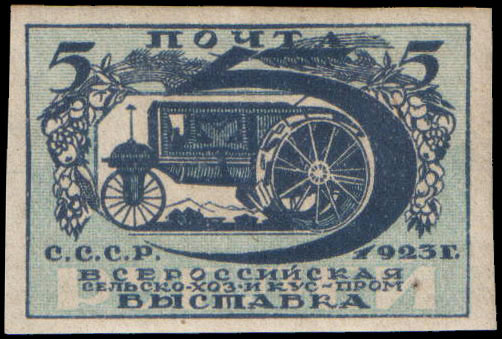
Tractor

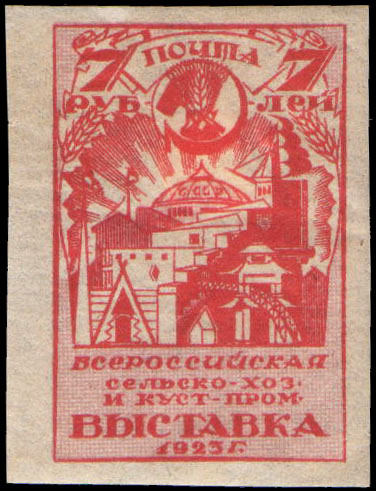
Exhibition general view

== See also ==
- First USSR stamps
