= Definitive stamps of the Soviet Union =

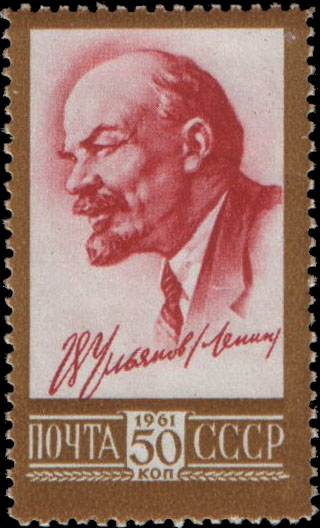
Vladimir Lenin on a Soviet definitive stamp of 1961. Designed by Pyotr Vasilyev

Definitive stamps of the Soviet Union were the regular postage stamp issues produced in the USSR between 1923 and 1992.

== First definitive issue ==
The inaugural release of the Soviet Union definitive stamps took place in October 1923, commonly referred to as the Gold Standard issue. These stamps prominently featured the busts of a worker, a Red Army man, and a peasant. Over the course of the years 1923 to 1926, the worker and soldier designs appeared on thirteen different stamps each, while the peasant design was featured on ten stamps.

Stamps of the 1st definitive, Gold Standard issue, 1923

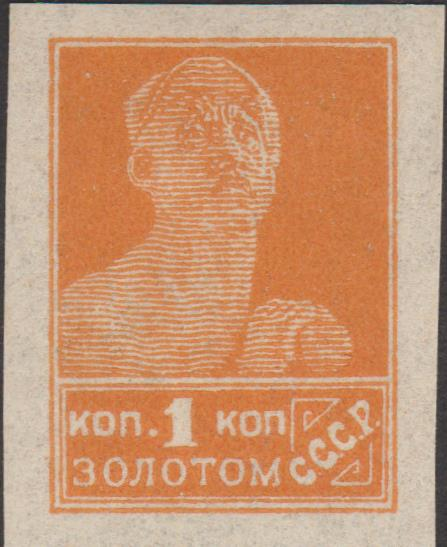
Worker

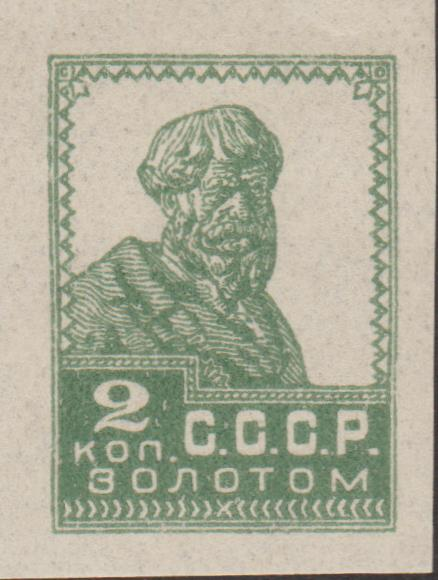
Peasant

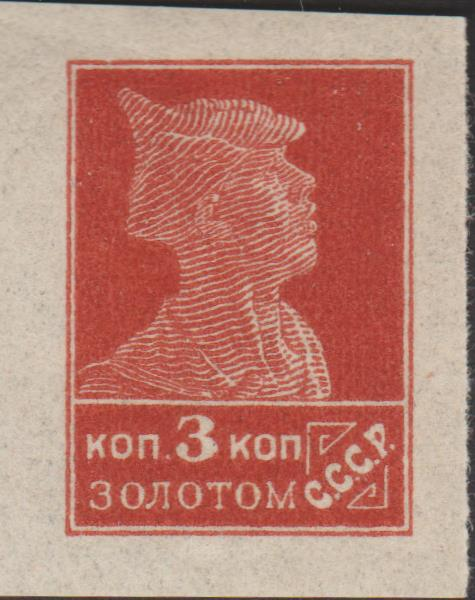
Red Army man

== Other notable issues ==
In 1929, the Soviet Union released its third set of definitive stamps. This series featured updated images depicting male and female workers, male and female collective-farm workers, and a Red Army soldier. These designs reflected the significant societal transformations brought about by industrialization, collectivization, and the advancement of women's rights in the Soviet Union. Notably, the inclusion of the female worker and female collective-farm worker alongside their male counterparts marked the first appearance of women on Soviet stamps.

Stamps of the 3rd definitive issue, 1929

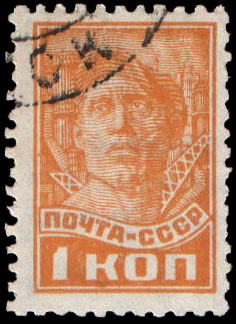
Worker

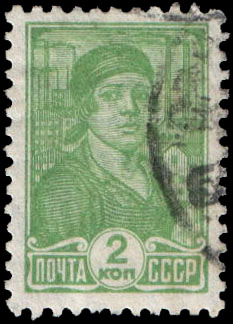
Female worker

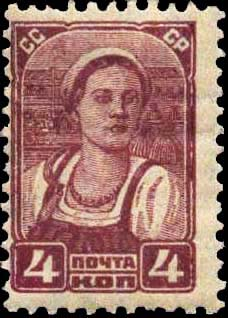
Female collective-farm worker

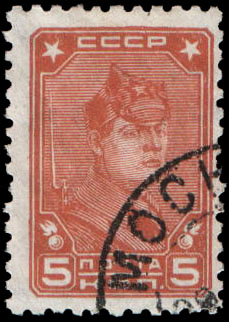
Red Army soldier

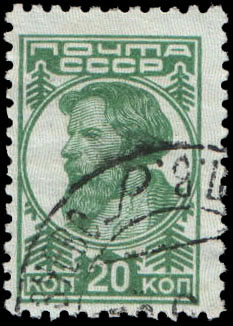
Collective-farm worker

With the progress of the socialistic economic programs, the representation of the major groups of Soviet society changed, moving from the more generic image of the earlier period. The worker was shown in the fifth issue of March 1939 as a steel foundryman and in the sixth issue of August 1939 as a miner.

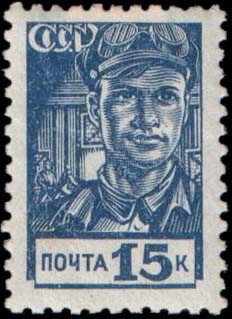
Foundryman, 5th issue, 1939

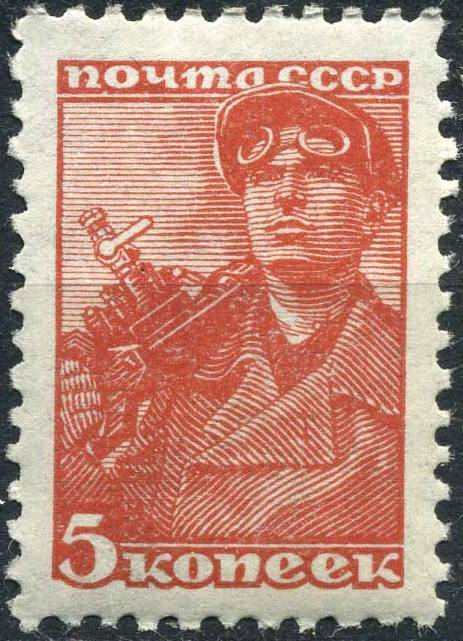
Miner, 6th issue, 1939

The last definitive series that begun in the Stalin period was the eighth issue (May 1948 to July 1957). It was remarkable by the fact that the scientist was for the first time portrayed on Soviet definitive stamps. In 1958, the engineer design appeared meaning that representatives of other Soviet labouring groups were also depicted on stamps. In 1961, a definitive stamp with the combine worker appeared.

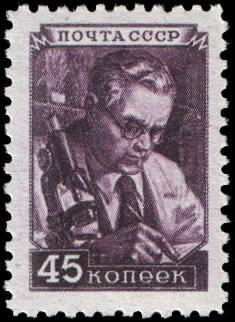
Scientist, 8th issue, 1948

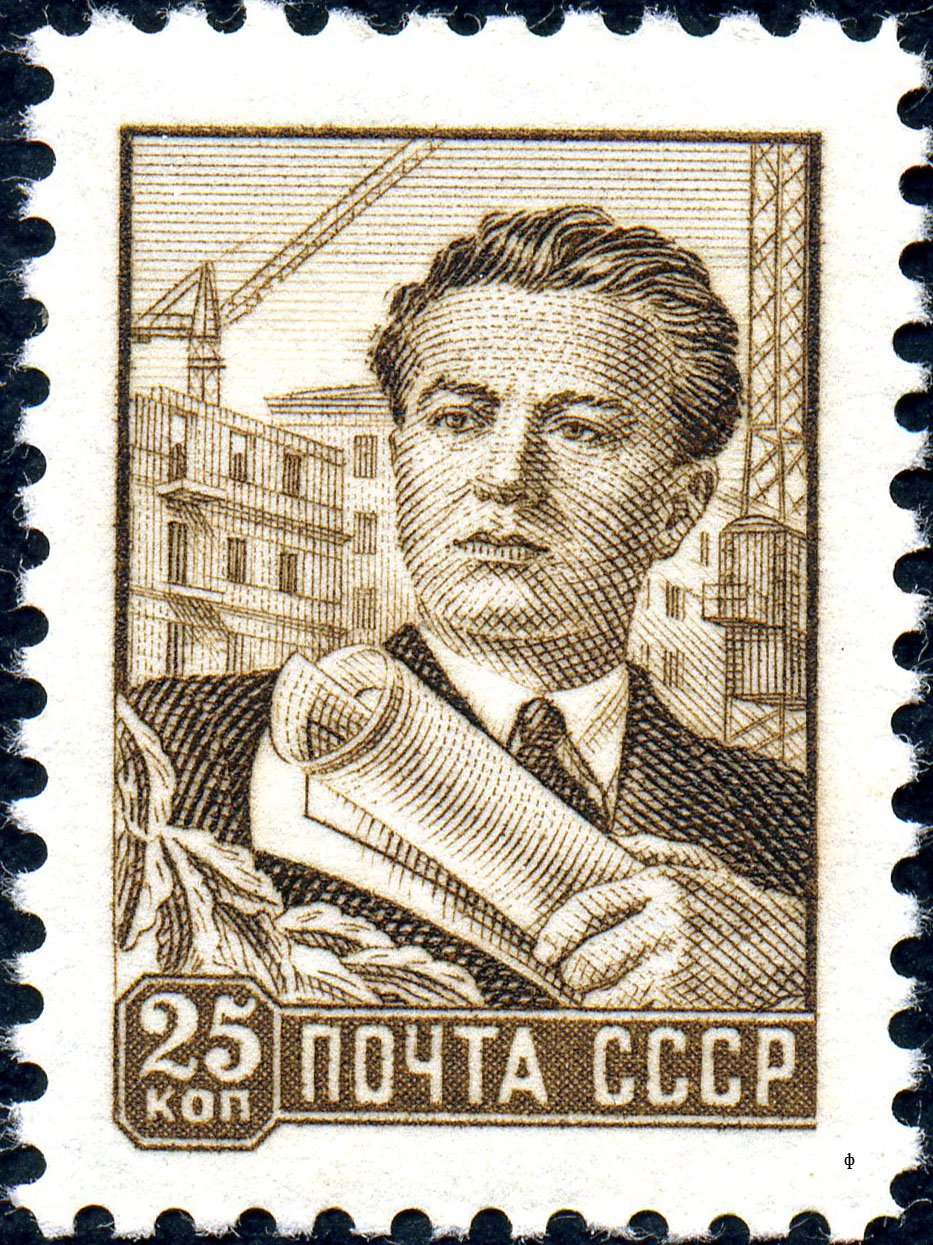
Engineer, 9th issue, 1958

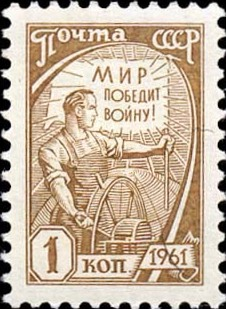
Combiner, 10th issue, 1961.
"Peace will win over war!"

== Summary of all issues ==
This table represents an outline of the overall USSR definitive issues produced in the Soviet and post-Soviet times (1923 – 1992).

Issue No.	Dates	CPA Catalogue No.	Stamp example
1 (Gold Standard issue)	11 October 1923 – January 1928	99–194; 251–270; 275–280	
2	October 1927 – October 1928	281–295	
3	August 1929 – January 1941	314–346	
4	1936–1953	556–559	
5	March – August 1939	667–669	
6	August 1939 – December 1956	693–701	
7	22 May 1948 – September 1954	1247–1255	
8	16 October 1948 – 1959	1379–1388	
9 (Note: Stamps of the 9th issue were in use till 1 April 1961.)	18 August 1958 – March 1960	2217–2223	
10	1 January 1961 – August 1966	2510–2520	
11	25 October 1966 – April 1969	3414–3437	
12	10 August – 17 December 1976; 8 September – November 1977; 4 August 1978	4599–4610; 4733–4744; 4853–4867	
13	1 December 1980; 25 April 1982; 12 December 1982; 28 December 1982; 20 May 1983; 15 May 1984; 5 September 1984; 20 January 1986; 25 June 1991; 22 August 1991; 19 November 1991; 20 April 1992	5136; 5287; 5340; 5357; 5392; 5510; 5548–5551; 5699; 6332; 5549А; 6375; 5549.I	
14	22 December 1988; 25 December 1989; 13 March – 25 June 1991	6013–6024; 6145–6156; 6298–6301	

== See also ==
- 70r Red Army Soldier error
- Definitive stamps of Russia
- First USSR stamps
- Leniniana (philately)
- List of paintings on Soviet postage stamps
- List of postage stamps
- Soviet and post-Soviet postage rates
- Soviet space exploration history on Soviet stamps
- Soviet Union stamp catalogue
- Stamps of the Soviet Union
