= First USSR stamps =

Soviet era post stamps

First All-Russia Agricultural Exhibition issue
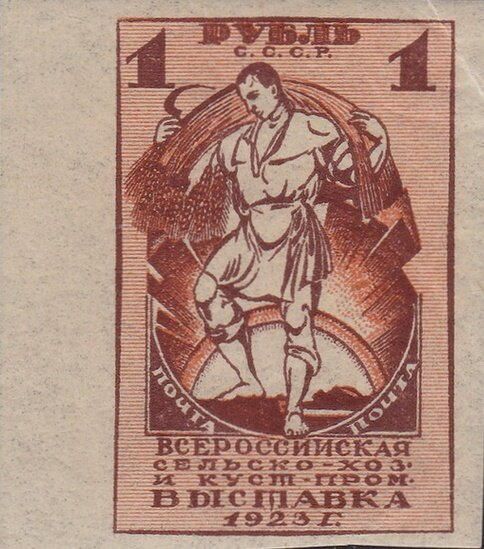
- Reaper: the first stamp of the USSR, 1 ruble, imperforate, 1923
- Country of production: Soviet Union
- Location of production: Moscow
- Date of production: 19 August 1923; 102 years ago
- Designer: Georgy Pashkov
- Perforation: none; line perforation 12½; line perforation 13½
- Commemorates: First All-Russia Agricultural Exhibition
- Depicts: reaper, sower, tractor, exhibition
- Notability: first postage stamps of the USSR
- Face value: 1, 2, 5 & 7 rubles

The first USSR stamps or First All-Russia Agricultural Exhibition issue appeared in August 1923 as a series of Soviet Union postage stamps. Its designer was the Russian artist Georgy Pashkov.

== History ==
The First All-Russian Agricultural and Handicraft Exhibition was held in Moscow in 1923. It was opened on 19 August. This very day, a special commemorative series of postage stamps dedicated to the exhibition opening was released. These were the first stamps of the Soviet Union.

== Stamps ==
The stamp design was created by the artist G. Pashkov.

The stamps have the inscription in Russian: "CCCP" ("USSR") or "Почта CCCP" (Post of the USSR), the value, and the words in Russian: "Всероссийская сельско-хоз. и кустарно-пром. выставка" (All-Russian Agricultural and Handicraft Exhibition). They were produced by lithographic printing in two versions, with or without perforations.

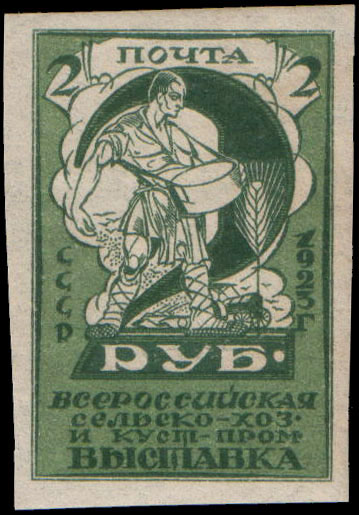
Sower, 2 rubles, imperforate

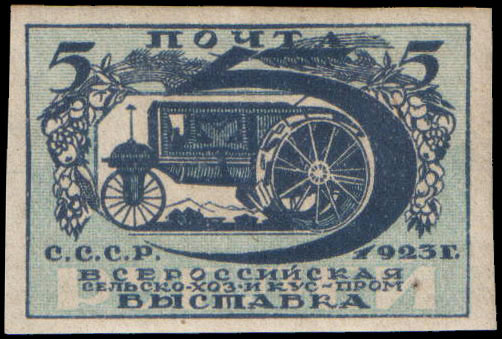
Tractor, 5 rubles, imperforate

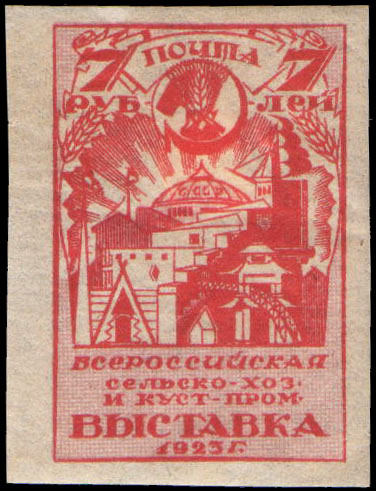
Exhibition general view, 7 rubles, imperforate

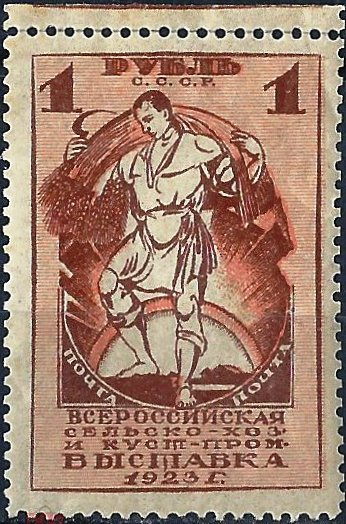
Reaper, 1 ruble, perf. 12½

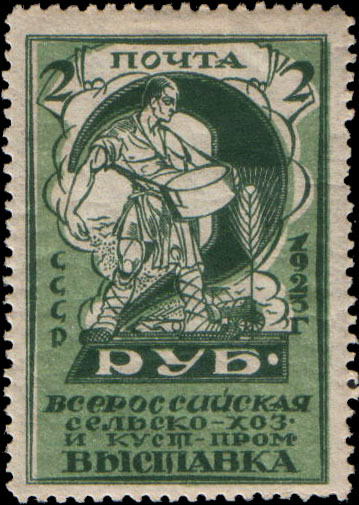
Sower, 2 rubles, perf. 12½

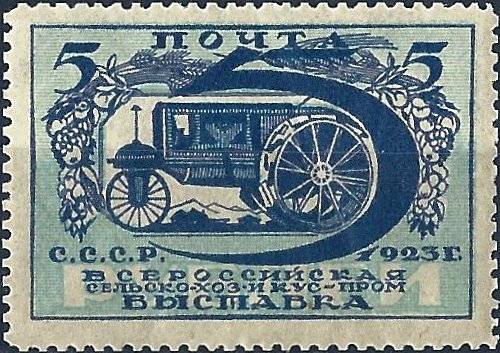
Tractor, 5 rubles, perf. 12½

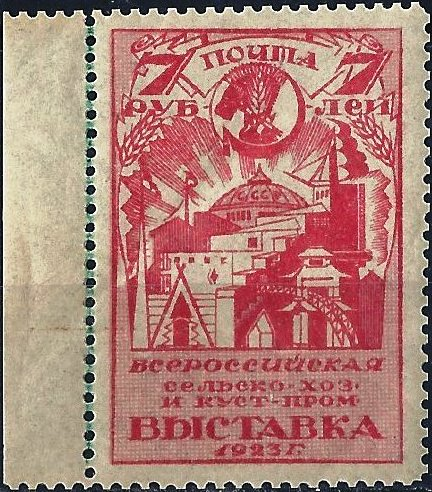
Exhibition general view, 7 rubles, perf. 12½

== See also ==
- Definitive stamps of the Soviet Union
- Georgy Pashkov
- Gold Standard issue
- List of postage stamps
- Postage stamps and postal history of Russia
- Soviet and post-Soviet postage rates
- Stamps of the Soviet Union
- Soviet Union stamp catalogue
