= History of Russian postage rates =

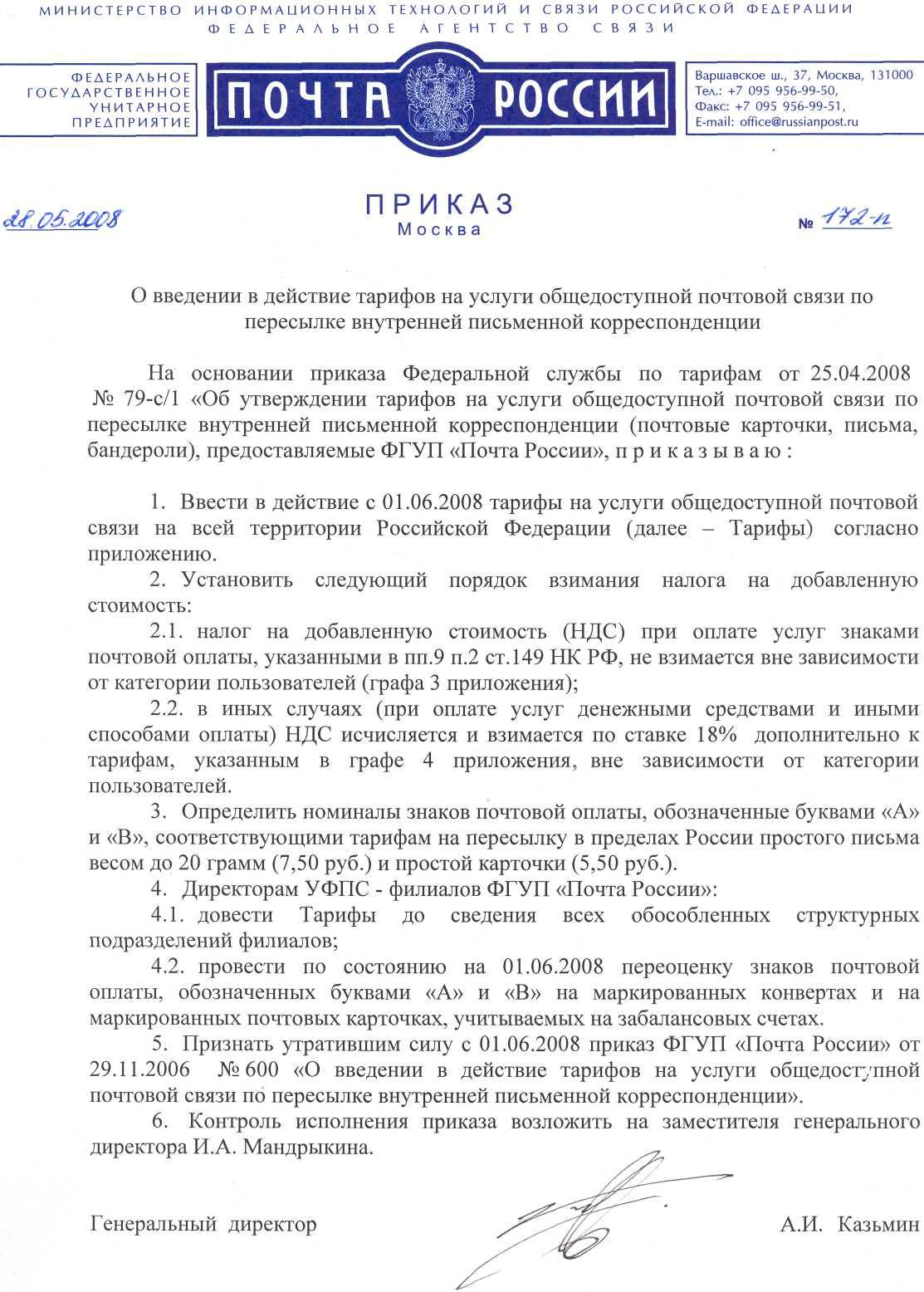
Order of the Russian Post announcing new postal rates as of 28 May 2008

Postage rates in Russia have changed multiple times in the period 1917 to present. They have been introduced by the Soviet and Russian Federation governmental organs and agencies and reflected in alteration of stamp denominations.

== Historical notes ==
The issue of Russian postage stamps is directly related to postage rates in force at given times during the history of the Russian postal service. Stamp denominations were applied to meet a public need to pay postage costs according to the current rates. Issuing values for the revenue generation was not a purpose of the state policy in this area. Change of postage rates is an important aspect in studying the Russian postal history and collecting its items.

Russian and especially Soviet postage rates have not been thoroughly researched in philatelic literature. This part of the Russian postal history is less studied, with comments appearing within some other context. Alteration of the postage rates led to the increases in the face value of the stamps as reflected in the numbers printed and overcharged. Thus, the rates were often the reason to revalue current stamps, issue new postage stamps or use various surcharges.

Postal rates for the despatch and delivery of internal mail were changed numerous times. For example, there were about 30 rate changes during the period 1918 to 1966.

== Russian Republic ==
Only over the first five years when the Russian Soviet Federative Socialist Republic existed as a sovereign state, from the Bolshevik Revolution in 1917 until the formation of the Soviet Union in 1922, postage rates changed 23 times. The early Soviet post office struggled to keep them up.

Usually, new rates were introduced by special decrees of the Government. In a few cases, this was done by the circularised orders of the postal administration known as "post office circulars". The rates for international postage were established by the same People's Commissariat for Posts and Telegraphs, later superseding by the Ministry of Communications of the USSR.

== Soviet Union ==
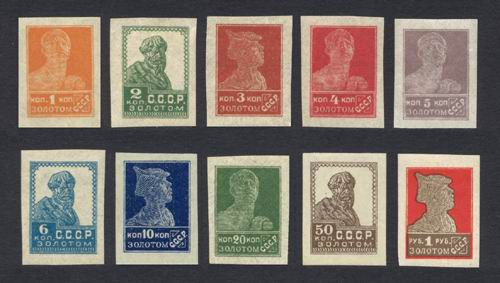
Gold Standard issue of the USSR. Rates in currency backed by the gold standard were introduced due to the Soviet monetary reform in the 1920s

During the USSR period from 1923 up to 1967, postal rates were changed ten times. Following the RSFSR practice, there was a special supplementary rate in case of registered mail that was added to the normal postage charge. This procedure was in effect until 1948 when a specific rate was established for registered mail. Also, higher rates for special classes of mail existed from 1923 to 1938 that were used for:

- “especially important” letters and packets,
- “express” postal sendings (special delivery mail),
- “special messenger” (for mail delivery to addresses more than 25 km from the nearest post office).
USSR stamps for “express” postal sendings, 1932

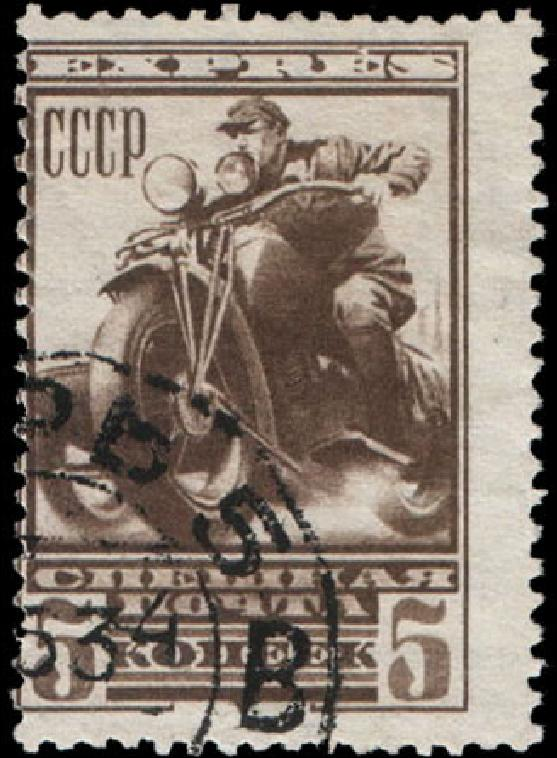
5 kopecks

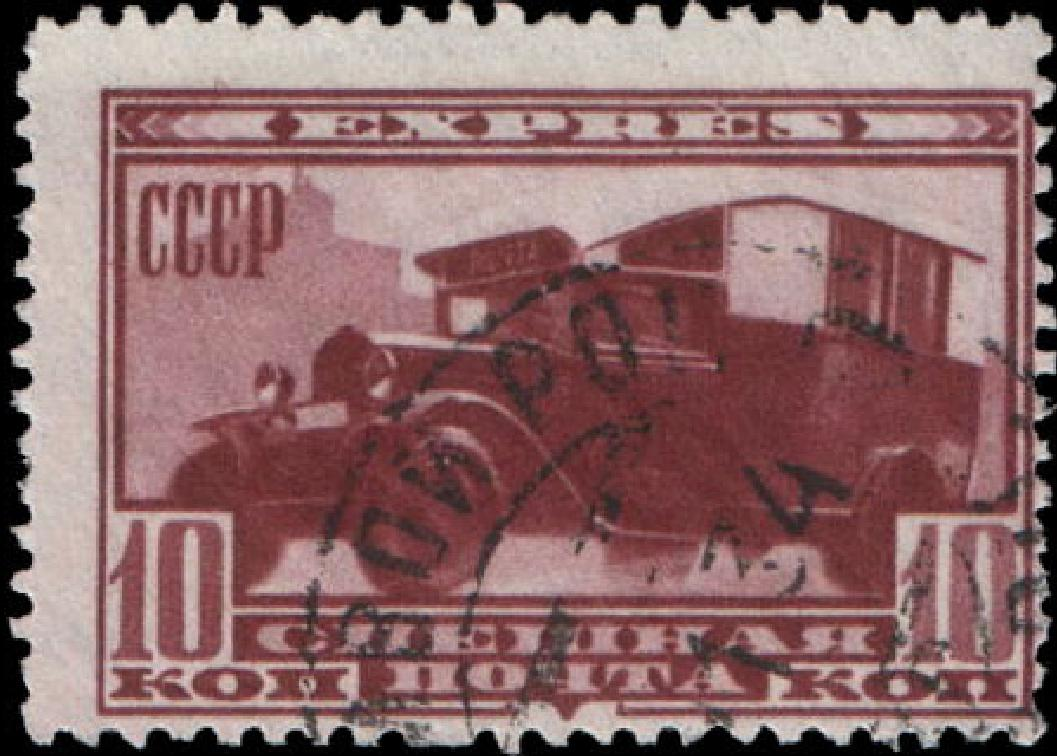
10 kopecks

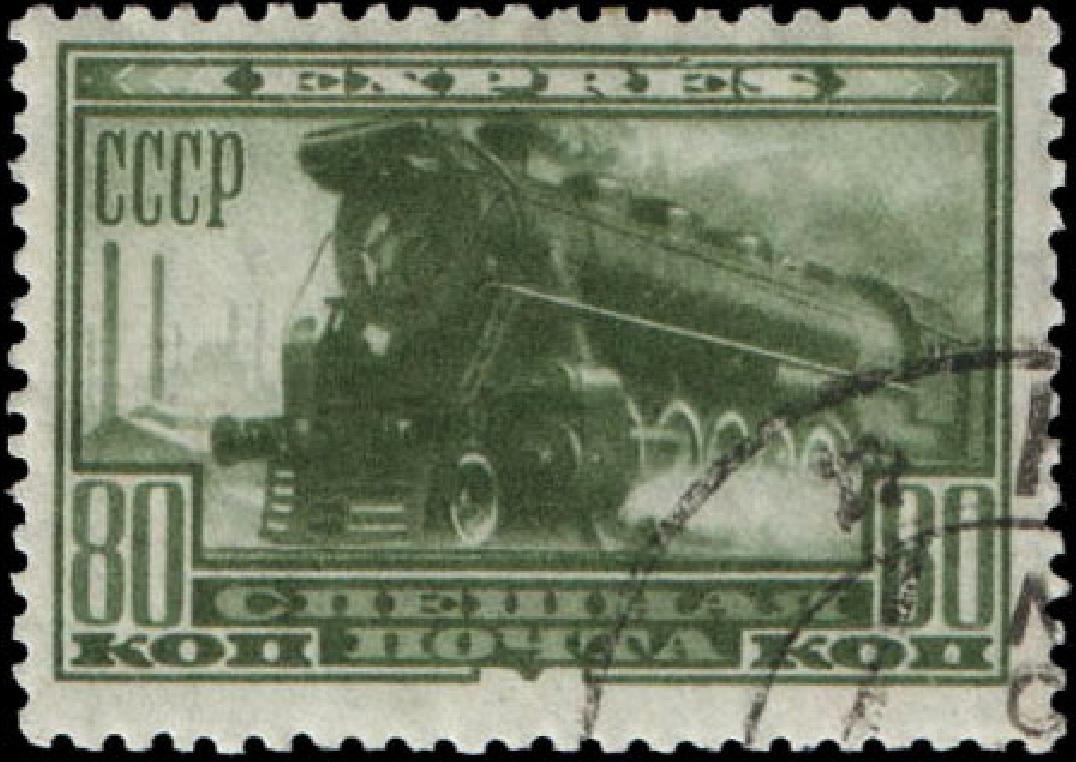
80 kopecks

An additional fee was charged for sending mail by air. Internal airmail rates were fixed in 1932 and those for international airmail in 1939. From 1936, the airmail rates were applied to regular operations all year round.

For underpaid internal mail, there was a charge at the registration rate. Charge for underpaid international mail was double the deficient postage.

Postal rates were based on the following gradation of letters by weight:

- “ordinary” letters weighing up to 20 g were charged at regular rates,
- letters weighing between 20 and 40 g were charged at double rates,
- letters weighing 40 to 60 g were paid triple rates and so forth.

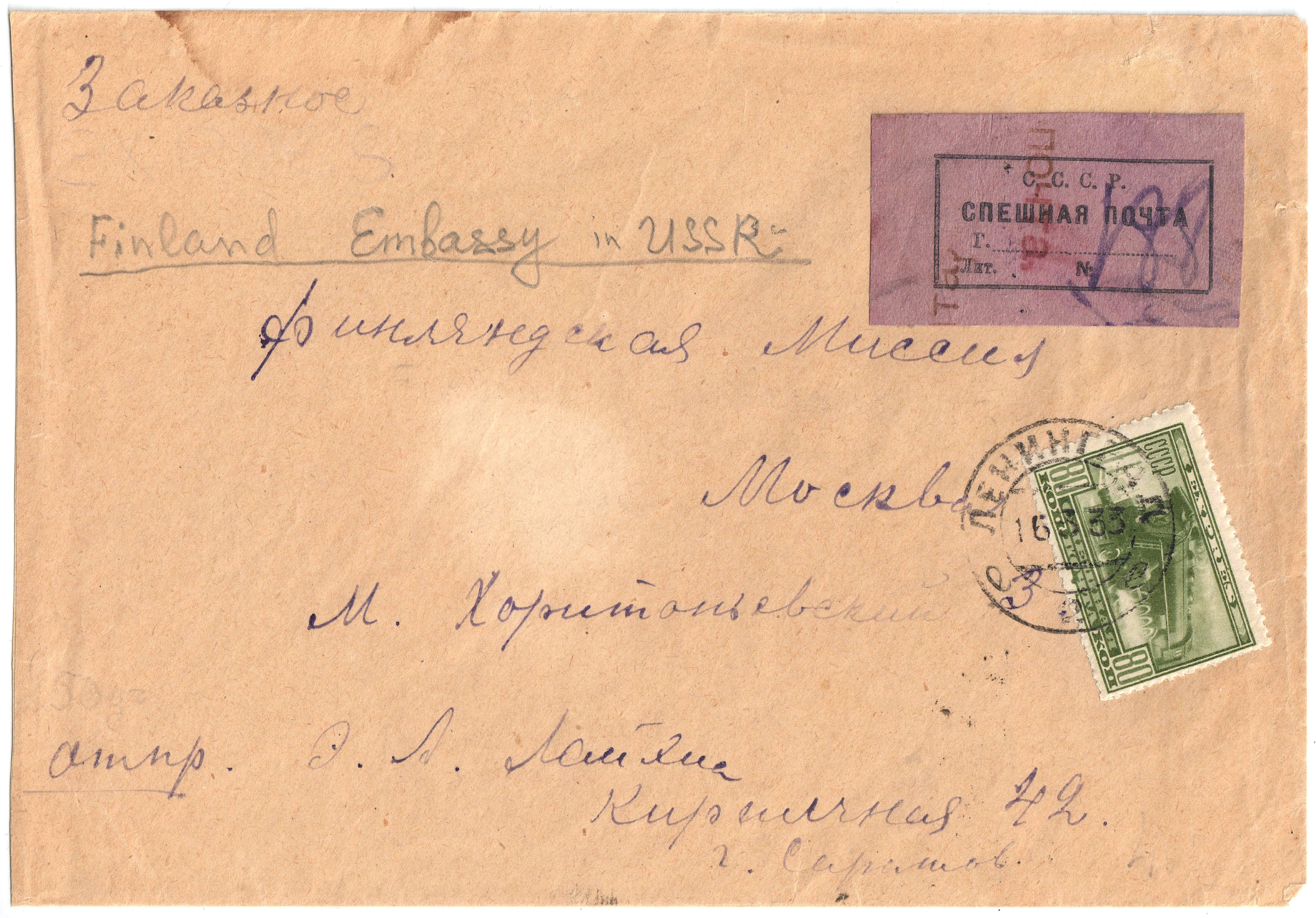
Express cover sent from Leningrad 16.3.33 to Moscow, reverse receiver postmark 17 03 33. Black on purple express mail registration label no. 188. Scarce usage of the 80 kopeck express stamp, paying the correct 80 kopeck rate, which was valid for letters from August 1, 1931.

== Russian Federation ==
Similar policy and practice of introducing postage rates have been continuing in the Russian Federation since 1992.

== Historical rates ==
This table represents an outline of the overall fluctuations of domestic postal rates in the Soviet and post-Soviet times.

History and range of internal postage rates in Russia since 1917
Years	Postcards		Letters		Registered mail letters	
Years	Minimum	Maximum	Minimum	Maximum	Minimum	Maximum
Russian Republic, RSFSR
1917–1923	5 kopecks, free of charge^{[a]}	20,000 roubles^{[b]}	10 kopecks, free of charge^{[a]}	50,000 roubles^{[b]}	20 kopecks	100,000 roubles^{[b]}
USSR
1923–1991	3 kopecks	25 kopecks	4 kopecks	40 kopecks	6 kopecks	1 rouble
Russian Federation
1992–2015	15 kopecks	650 roubles^{[b]}	20 kopecks	950 roubles^{[b]}	40 kopecks	1,100 roubles^{[b]}

^{a} At the government’s expense from 1 January 1919 until August 1921.
^{b} Due to hyperinflation.

== See also ==
- Definitive stamps of Russia
- Definitive stamps of the Soviet Union
- Ministry of Communications and Mass Media (Russia)
- Postage stamps and postal history of Russia
- Russian Post
- Stamps of the Soviet Union
