= Soviet Union stamp catalogue =

- Media type: Catalogue

Soviet Union stamp catalogue (or CPA catalogue) is a national catalogue of the RSFSR and USSR postage stamps and miniature sheets, which was being published in the USSR by the “Soyuzpechat” Central Philatelic Agency (CPA) and some other publishers related to the Ministry of Communications. The catalogue usually republished in corpore around once in a 10–15 years. In between republications, additional issues came out every year. These issues contains descriptions of stamps and miniature sheets issued in USSR last year.

== History ==
=== Early issues ===
The first Soviet catalogue appeared in 1923 under the editorship of Feodor Chuchin. In what follows, several more catalogues were published under his editorship in 1920s.

Fourth edition of the Soviet Philatelic Association catalogue published in 1933 under the editorship of V. Modestov also included a listing of the USSR postage advertising stamps as well.

=== Postwar issues ===
In 1948 and 1951, two more catalogues of the USSR postage stamps were published by the Philatelic Bureau under the Book-selling Association of State Publishers (KOGIZ).

This first postwar catalogue included all the RSFSR and USSR postage issues, which appeared from 1921 to 1948, and stamps of the previous issues (circulated in 1918–1921) as well as special purpose stamps.

In 1955, in Moscow the next edition of the Soviet Union stamp catalogue was published. It was compiled by a team of authors including M. T. Mil'kin, A. A. Shirokov, A. S. Chumakov, and A. Ya. Zezin. It was printed by the Chief Philatelic Bureau of the Ministry of Culture of the RSFSR.

In 1970, a new edition, The Catalogue of Postage Stamps of the USSR, 1918–1969, was published in Moscow. It was supplemented yearly afterwards.

In 1976, the publication of The Catalogue of Stamps of the USSR, 1918–1974 occurred followed up by annual additions.

== See also ==
- Definitive stamps of Russia
- Definitive stamps of the Soviet Union
- Postage stamps and postal history of Russia
- Stamps of the Soviet Union
