= Thomas Lera =

American philatelist

Thomas M. Lera
- Education: University of Illinois; University of Pennsylvania
- Occupation: Philatelist

Thomas M. Lera is an American philatelist who was the Winton M. Blount Research Chair at the Smithsonian National Postal Museum until 2021. He is also an expert on the preservation and the conservation of bats and caves and has been a vice-president of the National Speleological Society.

== Early life ==
Lera received his advanced education at the University of Illinois from where he received a Bachelor of Science degree in 1969 and the University of Pennsylvania from where he received a Master of Science degree in 1971.

== Philately ==
Lera was appointed the Winton M. Blount Research Chair at the Smithsonian National Postal Museum in 2008. He retired November 1, 2021. During his appointment he created the NPM Philatelic Forensic Laboratory through the purchase of specialised scientific equipment for the examination of paper, ink and color. Lera's research interests include the Underground Railroad Post Office and Confederate official and semi-official envelopes.

In 2012, Lera and Leon Finik produced a book on the Georges Henri Kaestlin collection of Russian Imperial and Zemstvo stamps held by the National Postal Museum which was published by the Smithsonian Institution Scholarly Press in their Smithsonian Contributions to Knowledge series.

Lera was elected to membership of the Royal Philatelic Society London in 2009 and became a fellow in 2012. He was inducted into the American Philatelic Society's writers hall of fame in 2015 and in 2016 received the Distinguished Philatelic Texan Award.

== Bats and caves ==
Lera is an expert on the conservation and preservation of bats and caves about which he has written management plans for the International Union for Conservation of Nature and Natural Resources. In 2006 he was appointed chairman of the Virginia Cave Board by governor Mark Warner. He has been a vice-president of the National Speleological Society.

== Selected publications ==
- Bat management in the United States : a survey of legislative actions, court decisions and agency interpretations. Environmental Protection Agency, United States, 1978. (With Sue Fortune)
- Bats in philately. American Topical Association, 1995. ISBN 978-0935991246
- Winton M. Blount Symposia: 2006 - 2009
- Cave post offices. Cave Books, 2011. ISBN 9780939748761
- The G.H. Kaestlin collection of Imperial Russian and Zemstvo stamps. Smithsonian Institution Scholarly Press, Washington DC, 2012. (With Leon Finik) (Smithsonian Contributions to Knowledge) ISBN 978-1935623113
