= Lera =

Lera may refer to:

== Given name ==
- Lera Auerbach (born 1973), Russian classical pianist
- Lera Boroditsky (born 1976), Belarusian scientist
- Lera Doederlein (born 2003), American sledge hockey player
- Lera Kudryavtseva (born 1971), Russian television presenter
- Lera Loeb, Ukrainian writer
- Lera Lynn (born 1984), American singer-songwriter
- Lera Millard Thomas (1900-1993), American politician

== Surname ==
- Antonio F. Lera (born 1952), Spanish writer
- Joe Lera (born 1961), Papua New Guinean politician
- Marie Léra (1864-1958), French journalist, novelist, translator
- Thomas Lera, American philatelist

== Places ==
- Lera, Bitola, a village in North Macedonia
- Monte Lera, a mountain in Italy
- Lera, a village in Chiojdu Commune, Buzău County, Romania
