= Georges Henri Kaestlin =

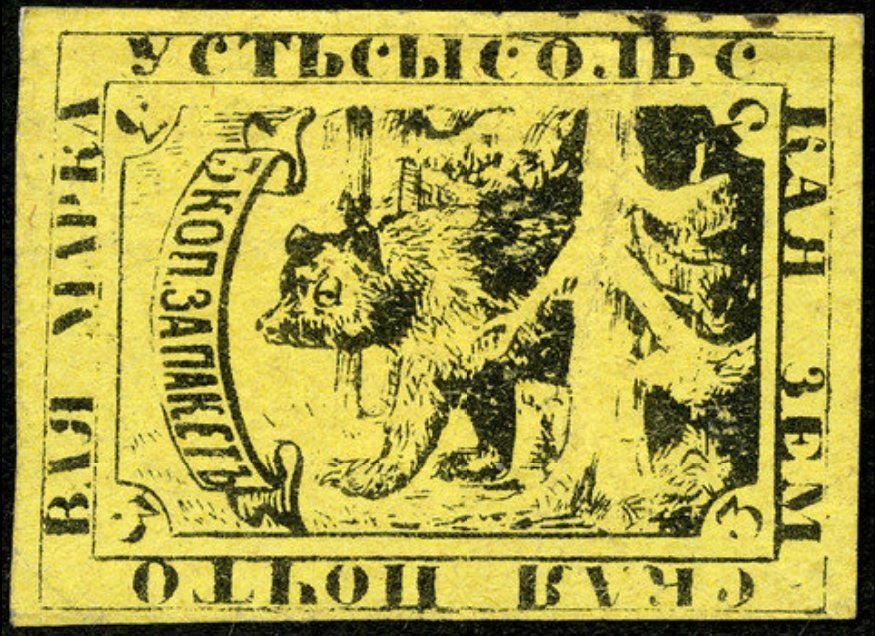
An 1872 3k Zemstvo stamp of Ustsysolsk from the Kaestlin collection.

Georges Henri Kaestlin (1892 – 18 February 1981) was a banker who formed a leading collection of Russian Imperial and Zemstvo stamps after he and his family were forced to leave Russia following the 1917 revolution. His collection was donated to the Smithsonian Museum in 1984 following his wish that it not be dispersed as other important collections had been.

== Early life ==
Georges Henri Kaestlin was born in Saint Petersburg in 1892 to Swiss parents. His father was the president and chairman of the Russian Bank for Foreign Trade. He was educated at the Prince Tenisheff Private School for Boys and later at the Imperial Polytechnic Institute from where he earned a degree in political economy. He was a keen sportsman, enjoying sailing, skiing and mountain climbing which he practiced during holidays at the family's Swiss home. By the age of 17 he had climbed many of the Swiss peeks.

== Life in England ==
Kaestlin embarked on a career in banking in Russia and married but was forced to leave the country with his family at the time of the revolution, never to return. They travelled to Sweden and Norway before settling in England where Kaestlin resumed his banking career. He lived in London and later Twickenham. His business career was uneventful and he devoted his energies to collecting and tennis which he played into his 70s. His only son died in an accident and his wife became seriously ill. After her death he retired to Switzerland. He later married Vera Bock, a Russian-born artist and illustrator who left St. Petersburg at the same time Kaestlin did.

== Philately ==
Kaestlin began to collect Russian Imperial stamps as a young man, widening his collection to include Zemstvo stamps when he arrived in England and later concentrating on just that area. The Zemstvo stamps were a form of local stamp issued from 1865 by the Zemstvo unit of local administration to rectify the deficiencies of the Imperial Post which only covered the major towns, leaving rural areas without a postal service.

He did not join philatelic societies, exhibit his collection, or write articles about it, however, he did make copious notes, research forgeries, and produce a typewritten catalogue of the collection. His write-up was meticulous and included hand-drawn maps. It is thought he also collaborated with Karl Schmidt, author of important Zemstvo catalogues of the 1930s. Despite his lack of participation in organised philately, Kaestlin was not completely unknown to the philatelic world, contributing to the guarantee fund for the Stamp Centenary Exhibition 1940, bidding in the Fabergé auctions of 1940, and entering into correspondence with Sir John Wilson, keeper of the Royal Philatelic Collection.

Kaestlin's collection consists of 13 volumes of stamps and covers, and 15 staging albums of stamps and postal stationery covering the period 1865 to 1917. In total, it has more than 1,500 pages and 14,000 stamps including many acquired from the Agathon Fabergé and Philipp von Ferrary collections. In 2012, the Smithsonian Institution Scholarly Press published a detailed account of the Kaestlin collection by Thomas Lera and Leon Finik in their Smithsonian Contributions to Knowledge series.

== Death and legacy ==
Kaestlin died in Zurich, Switzerland, on 18 February 1981. He left instructions that his stamp collection should not be auctioned or dispersed, as Agathon Fabergé's had out of necessity and against his wishes, and accordingly, in 1984, it was donated to the Smithsonian Museum by his wife, Vera Madeleine Kaestlin-Bock.

== Bibliography ==
- The GH Kaestlin Collection of Imperial Russian and Zemstvo Stamps (Smithsonian Contribution to Knowledge) (2012) ISBN 9781935623113

== See also ==
- Postage stamps and postal history of Russia
