= Maksut Shadayev =

Minister of Digital Development, Communications and Mass Media of the Russian Federation

- Максут Шадаев
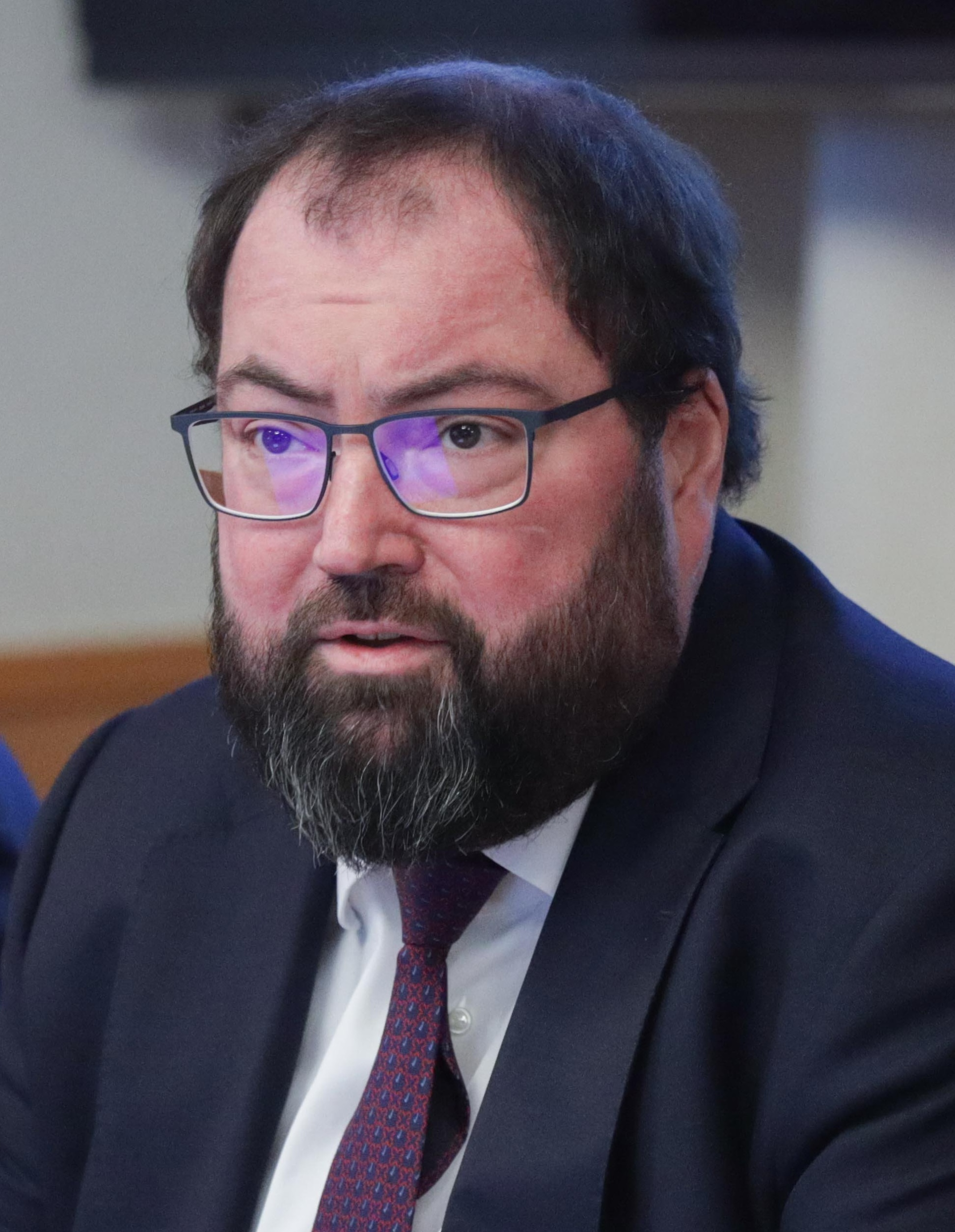
- Shadayev in 2025

Minister of Digital Development, Communications and Mass Media
- Incumbent
- Assumed office 21 January 2020
- Prime Minister: Mikhail Mishustin; Andrey Belousov (acting); Mikhail Mishustin
- Preceded by: Konstantin Noskov

Personal details
- Born: 11 November 1979 (age 46) Moscow, Soviet Union
- Education: Russian State Social University
- Profession: Sociologist
- Awards: Order of Honour; Medal of the Order "For Merit to the Fatherland", 2nd class

Maksut Igorevich Shadayev (Russian: Максут Игоревич Шадаев; born 11 November 1979) is a Russian politician serving as Russia's Minister of Digital Development, Communications and Mass Media since 21 January 2020.

== Biography ==
Since 1999, Shadayev has worked in companies within the information and communications technology sector. From 2000 to 2001, he worked at Arrava Internet Management, a company founded by Ilya Ponomarev and established by former executives of the oil company Yukos, registered in San Mateo, California. In October 2000, he held the position of Director of Internet Strategy at Arrava Internet Advisors.

In 2004, Shadayev graduated from the Russian State Social University with a degree in sociology. That same year, he was appointed Advisor to Leonid Reiman, then Russia's Minister of Information Technologies and Communications. On 6 February 2006, he became Director of the Department for State Programs, Infrastructure Development, and Limited Resource Utilization at the Ministry of Information Technologies and Communications. In 2007, he joined Minister Reiman on the Board of Directors of the venture fund Rosinfocominvest, which belonged to the Federal Agency for State Property Management and whose creation had been lobbied for by the Ministry of Information Technologies and Communications.

In May 2008, when the Ministry of Information Technologies and Communications was dissolved and replaced by the Ministry of Communications and Mass Media, headed by Igor Shchyogolev, Shadayev took the office of Director of the Department of State Policy in the Field of Informatization and Information Technologies.

In the autumn of 2008, he became an Assistant to the Kremlin chief of staff, Sergey Naryshkin. In this role, he was responsible for organizing the work of the Presidential Council for the Development of the Information Society, as well as overseeing the project to introduce biometric passports.

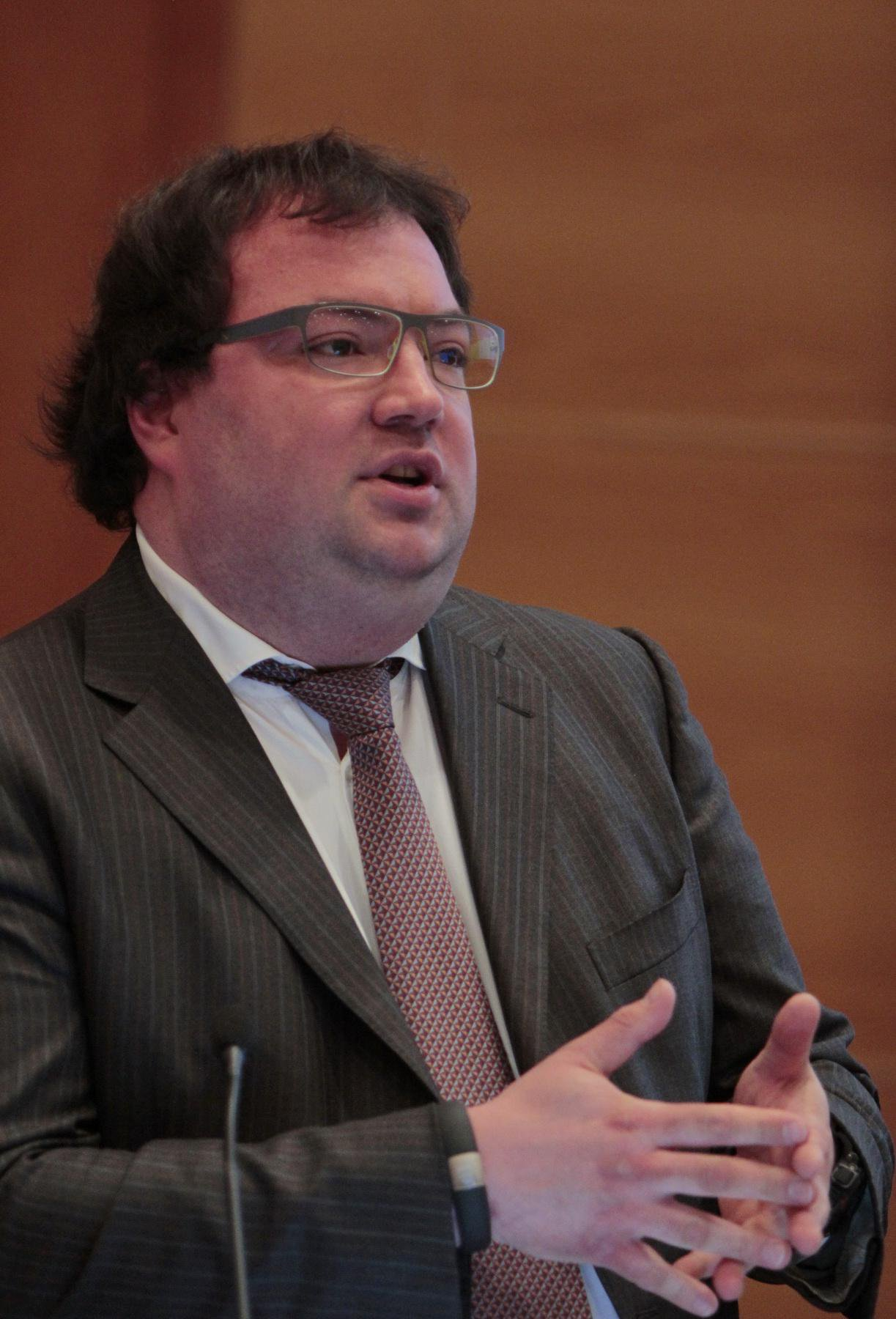
Shadayev in 2013

In 2012, Shadayev became an Advisor to the State Duma Speaker, Sergey Naryshkin. He was responsible for the implementation of the "Electronic Parliament" project.

On 11 February 2014, he was appointed Minister of Public Administration, Information Technologies, and Communications of Moscow Oblast. He joined the Moscow Oblast Government, headed by Governor Andrey Vorobyov. On 29 September 2016, he was also appointed Deputy Chairman of the Moscow Oblast Government. Under his leadership, the portal "Dobrodel", a unified online platform for complaints and suggestions from residents of Moscow Oblast, was launched. On 14 September 2018, following the resignation of the Moscow Oblast Government, Shadayev was not included in the new cabinet and instead assumed the role of Advisor to Governor Andrey Vorobyov on a pro bono basis.

According to Kommersant, since May 2017, Shadayev also served as a pro bono advisor to Sergey Kiriyenko, First Deputy Chief of Staff of the Presidential Administration of Russia, overseeing the social media information policy of regional authorities. On 26 September 2018, he was appointed Vice President for Digital Platforms at the state-owned telecom giant Rostelecom.

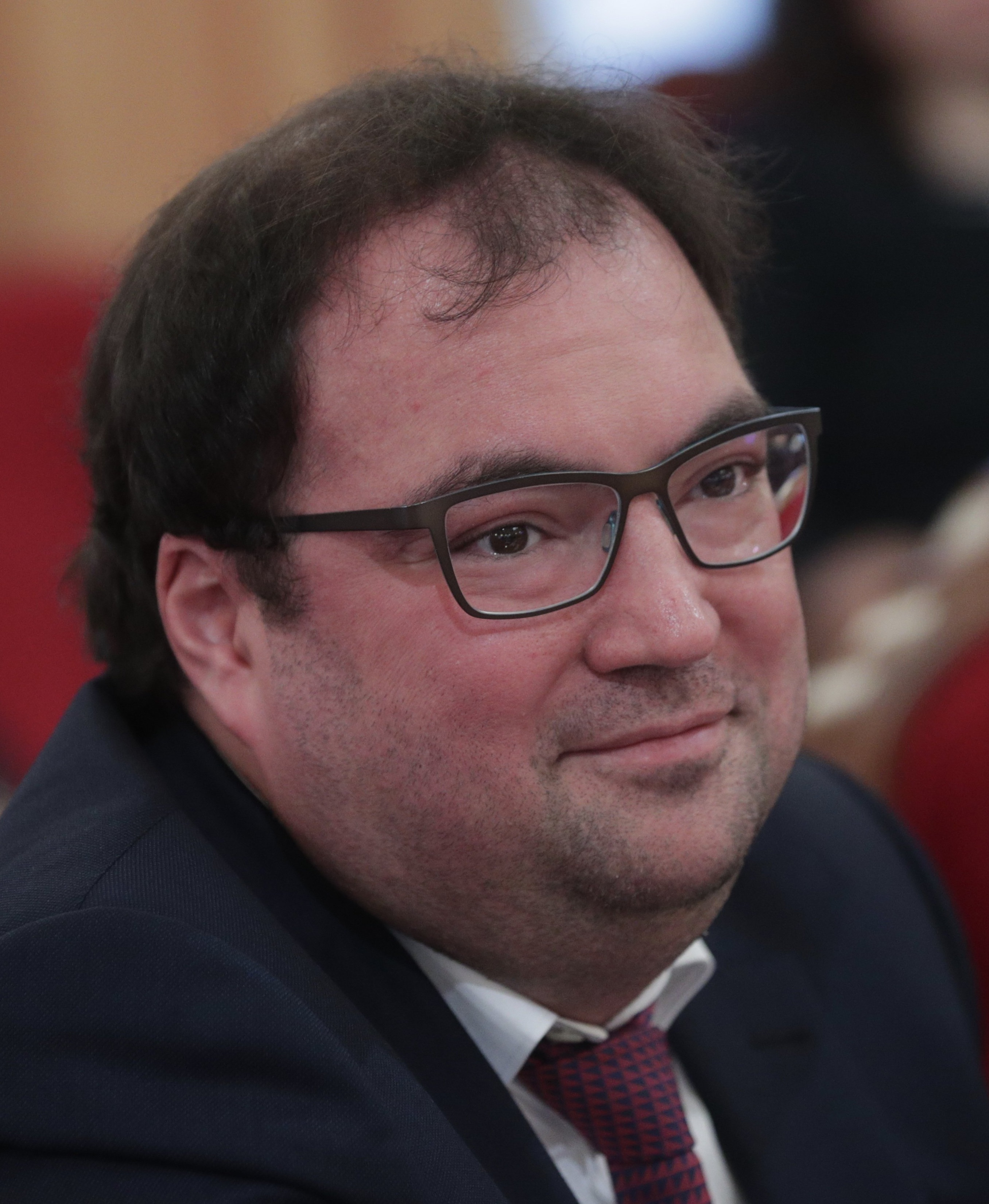
Shadayev in 2020

On 21 January 2020, he was appointed Russia's Minister of Digital Development, Communications and Mass Media in Mikhail Mishustin's First Cabinet. His first initiative in this new role, announced at a State Council meeting, involved granting law enforcement operatives online access to citizens' data without a court order. However, following a cautious reaction from Kremlin spokesman Dmitry Peskov, Shadayev stated that his position had been misunderstood.

On 14 May 2024, he was reappointed Minister of Digital Development, Communications, and Mass Media in Mikhail Mishustin's Second Cabinet. His previous tenure as minister and his reappointment were generally viewed positively by representatives of the industry.

== Personal life ==
Shadayev has never listed his spouse in his asset declarations. In the minister's declarations for 2020 and 2021, only two minor daughters are mentioned. During his tenure in the Moscow Oblast Government, Shadayev likewise did not include a spouse in his financial disclosure statements. According to Proekt, Shadayev's wife is one Aleksandra Viktorovna Melnikova (born 1983). They have had children together since 2014.

Shadayev is a fan of the Star Wars franchise, Cypress Hill, and New York Knicks.

== Sanctions ==
On 9 June 2022, Ukraine imposed sanctions against Shadayev in connection with Russia's invasion of Ukraine, noting that the Ministry of Digital Development, Communications and Mass Media "assists with mobilisation, therefore contributing directly to Russia's war of aggression against Ukraine".

On 8 July 2022, he was added to Canada's sanctions list targeting "Russian disinformation agents".

On 16 December 2022, he was added to the European Union's sanctions list for supporting and implementing policies that undermine or threaten the territorial integrity, sovereignty and independence of Ukraine. The European Union noted that activities under Shadayev's leadership were carried out for the extension of digital and telecommunications services into the illegally annexed regions of Donetsk, Luhansk, Kherson and Zaporizhzhia, to connect them directly to Russia, as well as to the illegally annexed Crimea. The Ministry also assists with the mobilisation, therefore contributing directly to Russia’s war of aggression against Ukraine.

On 24 February 2023, the U.S. Department of State included Shadayev in its sanctions list of individuals involved in "implementing Russian operations and aggression against Ukraine, as well as the illegal administration of occupied Ukrainian territories in the interests of the Russian Federation".

On similar grounds, he has also been placed on the sanctions lists of the United Kingdom, Australia, New Zealand, and Switzerland.

== Awards ==
- Medal of the Order "For Merit to the Fatherland", 2nd class (2019)
- Order of Honour (2010)
