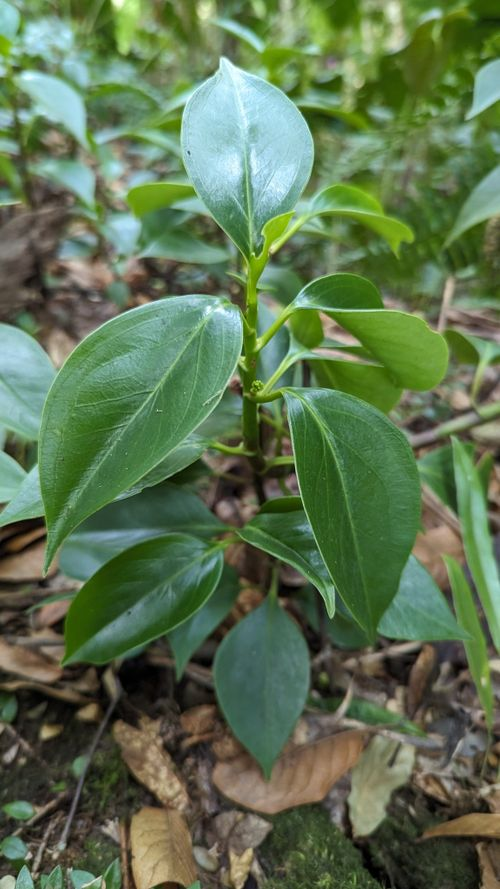

Scientific classification
- Kingdom: Plantae
- Clade: Embryophytes
- Clade: Tracheophytes
- Clade: Angiosperms
- Clade: Magnoliids
- Order: Piperales
- Family: Piperaceae
- Genus: Peperomia
- Species: P. dotana

Binomial name
- Peperomia dotana Trel.

= Peperomia dotana =

Species of epiphyte

Peperomia dotana is a species of epiphyte in the genus Peperomia that is endemic in Costa Rica and Panama. It grows on wet tropical biomes. Its conservation status is Threatened.

== Description ==
The type specimen was collected in Costa Rica and Panama at an altitude of 1800 meters.

Peperomia dotana is a rather large, rhizomatous, erect, nearly unbranched, hairless herb. The stem is stout at 3 to 6 millimeters thick. The leaves are alternate, somewhat diamond-shaped to lance-shaped, pointed at both ends, and rather large at 6 to 7 by 13 centimeters. They are thick with edges rolled downward, have pinnate veins below, and the delicate branches of the midrib number about 5 pairs by 2. The petiole is rather elongate at 2.5 centimeters long. The spikes are about 4 in number, scattered or bunched on slender branches growing from the leaf axils, with those branches measuring 5 or 6 centimeters long. The spikes are moderately slender and short at 30 to 40 millimeters. The peduncles are about 5 millimeters long. The floral bracts are round and peltate. The berries are gray, ellipsoid in shape, with a stout beak. The stigma is positioned at the front, at the base of the beak.

== Taxonomy and naming ==
It was described in 1929 by William Trelease in Contributions from the United States National Herbarium. The epithet dotana refers to the Dota region or Dota Valley in Costa Rica, where the type specimen was collected.

== Distribution and habitat ==
It is endemic in Costa Rica and Panama. It grows as an epiphyte and is a herb. It grows on wet tropical biomes.

== Conservation ==
This species is assessed as Threatened.
