= Stanislav Kudzh =

Russian scientist

Stanislav Alekseevich Kudzh
- Станислав Алексеевич Кудж
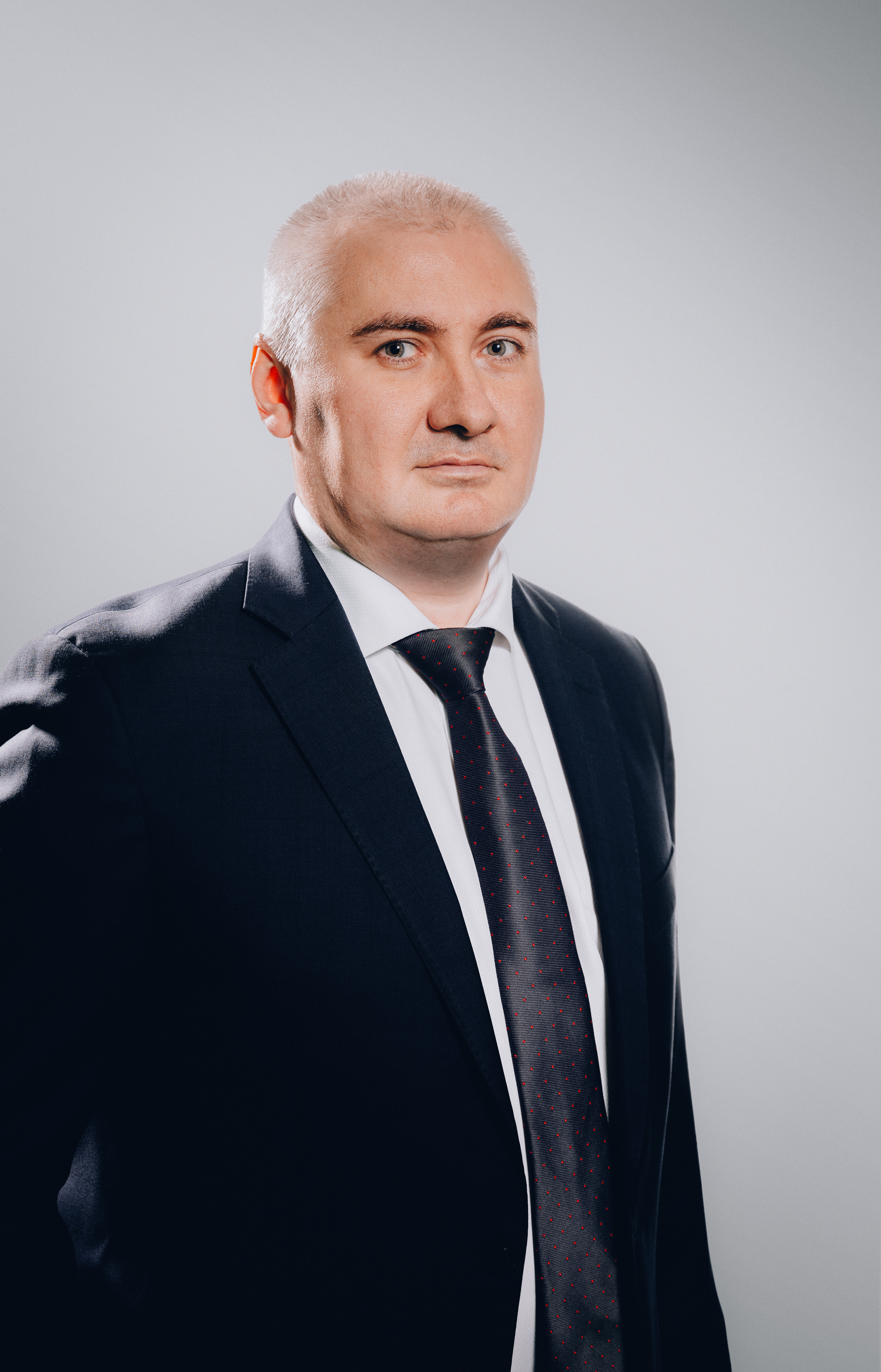
- Born: March 14, 1979 (age 47); Moscow, Soviet Union
- Citizenship: Soviet Union, Russian Federation
- Education: Moscow State University of Geodesy and Cartography
- Known for: Rector of MIREA – Russian Technological University
- Scientific career
- Workplaces: Rector of MIREA – Russian Technological University professor, Doctor of Technical Sciences

Stanislav Alekseevich Kudzh (born March 14, 1979, in Moscow) is a Russian scientist, specialist in automated public administration systems, multidisciplinary and multifunctional information systems. One of the authors of the concept of network-centric management of complex organizational and technical systems. Rector (since 2013) and Chairman of the Scientific Council of RTU MIREA, Doctor of Technical Sciences, full member of the Academy of Military Sciences.

== Career ==
In 2001, S. Kudzh graduated from Moscow State University of Geodesy and Cartography (MIIGAiK) with a degree in information systems; in 2002–2004, he worked at the University as an engineer and a leading programmer. Since 2010, S. Kudzh headed a department at the Ministry of Education and Science of Russia. In 2012–2013, he worked as Director of the Department of Civil Service, Personnel and Mobilization Training of the Ministry of Education and Science of the Russian Federation. On June 5, 2013, Stanislav Kudzh was appointed Rector of RTU MIREA.

== Academic and research interests ==
Scientific interests of S.A. Kudzh lie in the area of theoretical and applied problems and the solutions thereof at the nexus of systems theory, control theory, and informatics where related to reengineering of information processes and design of information infrastructure of complex organizational and technical systems, as well as computer learning technologies. In 2009–2013, using the concept of network-centric control, a model of the information and functional space of a complex organizational and technical system, methods of semantic and pragmatic assessment of information processes, S.A. Kudzh developed scientific and methodological basis for creation of the Unified State Information Support System for maritime activities, and substantiated the functional and technical architecture of this system. Stanislav Kudzh participates in multiple conferences in Russia and internationally. The citation index in the Russian scientific citation index is 856, the Hirsch index is 23. Over the past 5 years, he published 4 monographs and 31 scientific articles. Six textbooks were published under the authorship of S.A. Kudzh and with his participation.

S.A. Kudzh has copyright certificates and patents:

- Certificate of official registration of computer software No. 2001611294 Electronic Training System for Local and Global Internet (EOS) 2001 (co-authored).
- Certificate of state registration No. 2020663443 of computer software: Information system: State Register of Support of Educational Lending (IS Obrkredit (co-authored).
- Certificate of state registration No. 2019663701 of computer software Monitoring Information and Analytical System Version 1.1. (co-authored).
- Patent for the utility model RU 105051 U1, May 27, 2011, Comprehensive Engineering and Technical Protection of a Guarded Facility Using Speech Identification (co-authored).

== Achievements as the Rector ==
During S.A. Kudzh tenure of office, MIREA was significantly expanded in 2013–2015 following the accession of a number of universities, specifically: Lomonosov Moscow State University of Fine Chemical Technologies (MITHT), Moscow State University of Instrument Engineering and Computer Science (MGUPI), Russian Research Institute of Information Technologies and Computer-Aided Engineering Systems (Federal State Budget Institution ROSNIIITIAP), All-Russia Research Institute of Industrial Art (VNIITE), Institute of Professional Administration and Complex Energy Efficiency (IPK of the RF Ministry of Education and Science).

The University has mega-laboratories, academies of the leading world companies (Microsoft, Huawei, EMC, VMware, Samsung Electronics, Cisco, 1C-Bitrix); more than 50 specialized departments have been established at major high-tech enterprises and companies.

In 2019, the University established the Immunological Chemistry Chair under the N.F. Gamaleya National Research Center for Epidemiology and Microbiology, headed by D.Yu. Logunov, developer of Sputnik V, the world's first registered vaccine against COVID-19. In 2019, on the initiative of S.A. Kudzh, RTU MIREA created its own grant system. Research teams of the University can apply for the University grant provided they have applied for participation in the national competition to Russian Science Foundation (RSF), Russian Foundation for Basic Research (RFBR), the RF Ministry of Education and Science, etc., have received a positive assessment from experts or have passed the stage of selection on a formal basis while their own funds for the implementation of the project proved to be insufficient. Six grants were awarded in 2019, and nine, in 2020. Since 2019, Altair Children's Technopark has been functioning for high school students In 2021, the Technopark received the status of a federal innovation platform The Technopark hosts joint projects of the University and the Mail.ru Group, and Samsung IT School. Altair was commended by a special nomination for the Digital Summits 2020 national award

The Cyberzone Cybersport Center is open and has been functioning at RTU MIREA since November 2020.

In December 2020, the Situation Center was opened with the participation of V.N. Falkov, Head of the Ministry of Education and Science of Russia, and P.V. Malkov, Head of Rosstat Situation Center of the Ministry of Education and Science of Russia. This is a platform for collecting, accumulating and analyzing the relevant information on science and education indicators

== Public activities ==
S.A. Kudzh came up with a number of initiatives in science and higher education. According to S.A. Kudzh, the development of Russian science is impossible without big business investment: “The government faces an important task to make the economy knowledge-intensive. To change the balance of budgets towards private investment by 2035, measures must be taken now.”

S.A. Kudzh proposes combining methodological efforts of online schools and Russian technological universities. "It is obvious that there will be no mass migration from classroom education to online format... At the same time, Internet-based education is ultra-mobile and dynamic. Today in Russia, online platforms for teaching foreign languages and for corporate education have already firmly asserted themselves. Such experience needs to be transferred to other types of education, primarily focused on innovation and the future," he said in an interview to Rossiiskaya Gazeta (RG)

S.A. Kudzh came up with an initiative to legislatively establish the concept of "industrial design" and work towards creating a national style for this type of design. In a letter to the Ministry of Industry and Trade addressed to D. Manturov, he indicated a number of the measures to be taken: increasing the number of budget-funded places at universities, creating a system of state support for medium-sized businesses in the industrial sector of the economy for development of industrial design in cooperation with universities.

Addressing D. Chernyshenko, Deputy Prime Minister, within the framework of the Education National Project and the Personnel for Digital Economy Federal Project, he proposed including a special line in the graduation certificates, to reflect the digital skills acquired during training

== Awards and commendations ==
S.A. Kudzh has commendations and certificates of honor from the Federal Agency for Information Technologies (2005), the Ministry of Science and Higher Education of the Russian Federation (2009, 2016); the honorary title Honorary Worker of Science and Technology of the Russian Federation (2014), Medal of the Ministry of Emergency Situations of Russia XXV years of EMERCOM of Russia (2015), Commemorative Badge 50 years of the Space Era, Commemorative Medal XIX World Festival of Youth and Students in Sochi (2017), Honorary Badge of Academician A.I. Berg. S.A. Kudzh is awarded the Certificate of Honor of the President of the Russian Federation (2018).

== Family ==
Married, has two children.
