= Konstantin Noskov =

Russian economist and politician (born 1978)

- Константин Носков
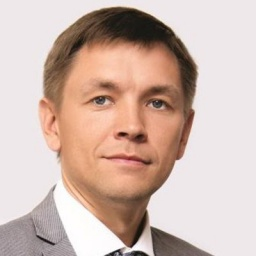
- Official portrait, 2018

Minister of Digital Development, Communications and Mass Media
- In office 18 May 2018 – 15 January 2020; Acting: 15 January 2020 – 21 January 2020
- Prime Minister: Dmitry Medvedev
- Preceded by: Nikolay Nikiforov
- Succeeded by: Maxut Shadayev

Personal details
- Born: 26 September 1978 (age 48) Oktyabrsky, Arkhangelsk Oblast, Soviet Union
- Education: MSUIECS; Higher School of Economics
- Profession: Economist

Konstantin Yurievich Noskov (Russian: Константин Юрьевич Носков; born 26 September 1978) is a Russian economist and politician, who served as Minister of Digital Development, Communications and Mass Media of Russia from 18 May 2018 to 15 January 2020.

He has the federal state civilian service rank of 1st class Active State Councillor of the Russian Federation.

== Biography ==
Konstantin Noskov was born on 26 September 1978 in the village of Oktyabrsky in Arkhangelsk Oblast.

In 2000, he graduated from the Moscow State University of Instrument Engineering and Computer Sciences with a degree in Automated information processing and management systems, and in 2001 he completed a master's degree in Strategic management at the Higher School of Economics.

From 2000 to 2001 he worked as an economic analyst of the program Big Money on NTV chanel.

In 2001 he joined the Ministry of Economic Development. For the first three years he held the positions of chief specialist, Deputy Head of the Department, Head of the Department of Economic Development Programs of the Department of Economic Development and Cooperation with International Financial Organizations.

In 2004 he was appointed Deputy Director of the Department of Socio-Economic Reform Strategy, and then - Deputy Director of the Department of Budgeting and Consolidated Financial Balance.

In 2008, Konstantin Noskov joined the Russian Government as Deputy Director of the Department of Public Administration, Regional Development and Local Self-government.

In 2009, by Order of the then Prime Minister Vladimir Putin, the Department of IT and Communications was established in the Government structure, and Noskov was appointed Director of this Department.

At the end of 2012, Konstantin Noskov was appointed head of the Analytical Center under the Government of Russia.

On 18 May 2018, was appointed Minister of Digital Development, Communications and Mass Media in Dmitry Medvedev's Second Cabinet. On 15 January 2020, he resigned as part of the cabinet, after President Vladimir Putin delivered the Presidential Address to the Federal Assembly, in which he proposed several amendments to the constitution.

Since September 2020, for four months, he headed the St. Petersburg Currency Exchange, which specializes in trading securities of "sanctioned" companies. Retired in January 2021.

Political offices
Preceded by Nikolay Nikiforov	Minister of Digital Development, Communications and Mass Media; 2018–2020	Succeeded by Maxut Shadayev
