= MIREA – Russian Technological University =

University in Moscow, Russia

Coordinates: 55.6700°N 37.4808°E

- МИРЭА – Российский технологический университет
- Other names: VZEI, MIREA, MIREA (TU), MGTU MIREA, MIREA, MGUPI, MITHT, Moscow Technological University
- Motto: Best among equal – equal among the best! Optimus inter pares — par inter optimos!
- Type: Public
- Established: 1947
- President: Alexander S. Sigov
- Rector: Stanislav A. Kudzh
- Undergraduates: More than 25000
- Location: Moscow, Russia
- Website: english.mirea.ru/

University rankings

Global – Overall
- USNWR Global: 1,960 (2023)

Regional – Overall
- QS Emerging Europe and Central Asia: 301-350 (2022)

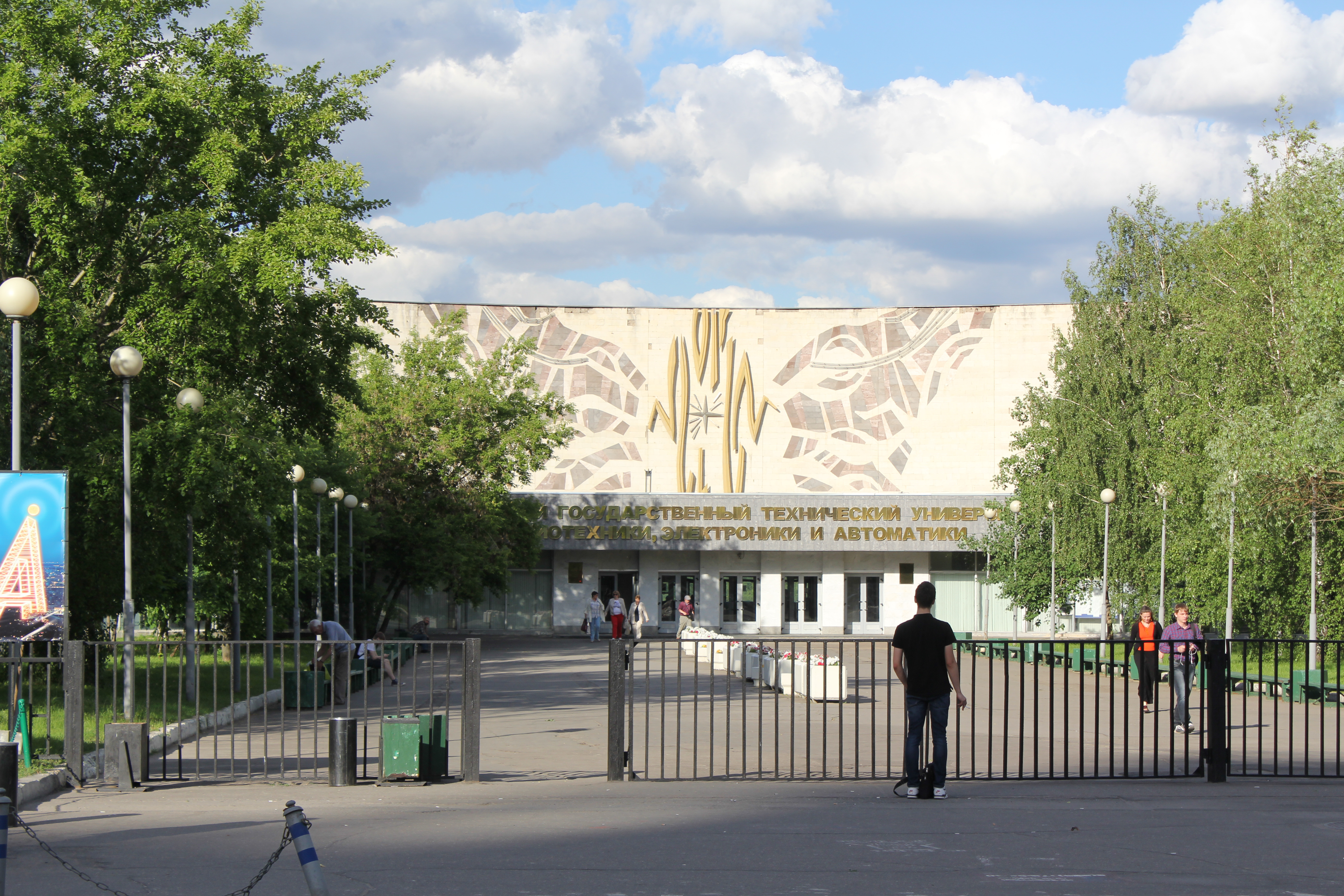
MIREA building in 2015

MIREA — Russian Technological University (RTU MIREA) is The Federal State Budget Educational Institution of Higher Education «MIREA — Russian Technological University» (RTU MIREA). It is a higher educational institution in Moscow, Russia, which is an educational, research and innovation complex. It was ranked # 1,960 globally in 2023 by US News & World Report.

== General information ==
RTU MIREA includes 8 institutes, 160 departments, 38 research units, and more than 50 specialized departments. The university provides training in 112 areas and specialties (bachelor's, specialist's, master's, postgraduate studies) in IT, cyber security, electronics, radio engineering, robotics, chemistry, biotechnology, etc. The university also provides an opportunity to receive additional education. Stanislav Alekseevich Kudzh, Doctor of Technical Sciences is Rector of RTU MIREA.

The university employs over 2,500 people as teaching staff (77% have an academic degree), including 21 academicians and corresponding members of the Russian Academy of Sciences, more than 280 members of other academies, Russian and international scientific societies, as well as more than 400 doctors of sciences and more than 1,300 candidates of sciences.

A number of lectures and training courses are delivered by visiting foreign professors. Practicing designers, chief engineers and general directors of partner enterprises act as lecturers and trainers at the specialized departments for students (starting from the 3rd year).

Every year the university is allocated 4,367 budgetary places and about 26,000 students are currently studying here. About 1,200 international students from 80 countries of the world study at the Institute of International Education of RTU MIREA. Upon graduation, a diploma is issued recognized both in the Russian Federation and abroad.

== Historical background ==
The history of RTU MIREA begins on May 28, 1947 when the Correspondence Institute for Advanced Training of Engineering and Technical Workers of the Ministry of Power Plants and Electrical Industry of the USSR was transformed into the All-Union Correspondence Power Engineering Institute for the Training and Improvement of Engineers (VZEI). It had branches in Leningrad, Kiev, Baku, Tashkent, Sverdlovsk, and Novosibirsk. Later, on the basis of these branches and training and consulting centers, a number of technical universities were opened in Omsk, Kemerovo, Kirov and other cities of the USSR.

The university got the name of the Moscow Institute of Radio Engineering, Electronics and Automation (MIREA) on June 30, 1967. The training of engineering personnel for the science-intensive industries of the electronic and radio industry, mechanical engineering and instrument making, automation equipment and control systems started in a full-time mode, not just by correspondence. Nikolai Nikolayevich Evtikhiev was elected Rector of MIREA.

In 1993, MIREA was granted the status of a technical university. Between 1998 and 2013, Alexander Sergeevich Sigov, Doctor of Physical and Mathematical Sciences, Professor, Academician of the Russian Academy of Sciences, was Rector of MSTU MIREA, and later, since 2013, he has been president of the university.

The year of 2013 Stanislav Alekseevich Kudzh takes up the position of rector, and a process of combining the potential of research and educational institutions begins: the Russian Research Institute of Information Technologies and Computer-Aided Engineering Systems (the Federal State Budget Institution ROSNIIITIAP) and the All-Russian Research Institute of Industrial Art (VNIITE) (2013), the Moscow State University of Instrument Engineering and Computer Science (MGUPI), the Institute of Professional Administration and Complex Energy Efficiency (IPAIKE) (2014), Lomonosov Moscow State University of Fine Chemical Technologies (MITHT) (2015). Today the latter has the name of Lomonosov Institute of Fine Chemical Technologies.

In 2018, by the decision of the Ministry of Education and Science of Russia, the Federal State Budget Educational Institution «MIREA — Russian Technological University» was created as part of the Moscow State Technical University of Radio Engineering, Electronics and Automation (MSTU MIREA), the Moscow State University of Instrument Engineering and Computer Science (MGUPI), Lomonosov Moscow State University of Fine Chemical Technologies, the Russian Research Institute of Information Technologies and Computer-Aided Engineering Systems (FSI ROSNIIITIAP), the All-Russian Research Institute of Industrial Art (VNIITE), the Institute of Professional Administration and Integrated Energy Efficiency (IPK Ministry of Education and Science of Russia) and the Institute of Modern Educational Technologies and Projects (ISEPP).

== RTU MIREA today ==
=== University structure (institutes and divisions) ===
Within its structure RTU MIREA has a number of institutes that implement higher education programs (bachelor's, specialist's, master's and postgraduate studies):

- Institute for Advanced Technologies and Industrial Programming;
- Institute of Information Technologies;
- Institute of Artificial Intelligence;
- Institute for Cybersecurity and Digital Technologies;
- Institute of Radio Electronics and Informatics;
- Lomonosov Institute of Fine Chemical Technologies;
- Institute of Management Technologies.

Apart from that, there are institutes of

- additional education;
- pre-university training;
- youth policy and international relations;
- international education.

Reserve officers, reserve sergeants and reserve soldiers are trained by the Military Training Center. Every year, students and graduates are selected for research squadrons/companies of the Russian Ministry of Defense.

The College of Instrumentation and Information Technologies provides training for students to further continue their study at RTU MIREA under higher education programs. The university has two branches, which are located in Stavropol (South of Russia) and Fryazino (Moscow region).

=== Educational activities ===
The educational programs of the university are certified in conformity with the international standards; modern laboratories and academies with the participation of manufacturers (Microsoft, Cisco, VMware, EMC, Huawei and others) have been opened, the Cyberzone Cybersport Center has started to operate.

RTU MIREA cooperates with enterprises in high-tech industries and research institutes of the Russian Academy of Sciences, and more than 50 specialized departments have been created in affiliation with them. Thanks to the cluster system «university — partner enterprise — specialized department», fundamental education in junior courses is combined with high-quality training of senior students at potential workplaces. In particular, since 2019, the Department of Immunological Chemistry has been functioning at the Federal State Budget Institution National Research Center for Epidemiology and Microbiology named after Honorary Academician N.F. Gamaleya of the Ministry of Health of the Russian Federation, which will be headed by Denis Yuryevich Logunov, Doctor of Biological Sciences, Deputy Director for Research of the Gamaleya Center, Corresponding Member of the Russian Academy of Sciences, who in 2020 led the team of developers of the world's first registered vaccine against coronavirus infection — «Sputnik V».

In May 2021, RTU MIREA signed a roadmap for long-term cooperation with the Federal State Budget Institution «National Medical Research Center of Radiology» of the Ministry of Health of Russia opening the Research and Educational Center for Medical Radiology and Dosimetry. The center is equipped with a high-tech system of virtual imaging in the field of radiation therapy VERT, and training is conducted with the participation of the leading specialists from the Research Center named after Tsyba, National Medical Research Radiological Centre of the Ministry of Health of the Russian Federation, Dmitry Rogachev National Research Center, and the Institute for Nuclear Research, RAS).

In July 2021, the university entered into a cooperation agreement with the educational platform Skillbox (its CEO, Dmitry Krutov, is an RTU MIREA alumnus). It is planned to develop and implement joint higher education programs, create conditions for both online and offline education and training, and conduct scientific and practical conferences and other events.

=== University and Research Mega-laboratories ===
Every year since 2015, laboratories have been launched at the university: universal research and technical centers where the developments of several departments or institutes, as well as educational, scientific and production capacities are combined.

2015: interdepartmental specialized educational and research laboratory «Intelligent autonomous and multi-agent robotic systems». 2016: Innovative technologies in microelectronics (2016).

2017: specialized educational and research laboratories of Information Technologies of the Internet of Things (the Samsung IT Academy educational project is under way) and Multimedia Technologies equipped within the framework of cooperation with Samsung Electronics.

2018: space center simulation equipment; a universal educational and research laboratory of technologies for analytics, modeling, design and digital prototyping on the basis of the Institute of Information Technologies.

2019: Inter-Institute Training Center «Industry 4.0 Digital Robotic Manufacturing»; educational and research center for catalytic and mass transfer processes; precision information-measuring analytical systems.

2020: Research and educational center for biosynthesis, isolation and purification of monoclonal antibodies, a number of laboratories — digital and additive technologies in mechanical engineering (3D modeling module); immersive technologies; digital design and modeling of radio electronic equipment; technological processes for the production of radio-electronic equipment; assembly and installation of radio electronic equipment; tuning and adjustments of radio electronic means; 3D prototyping and inspection of multilayer printed circuit boards; Geographic Information Systems; tracking and motion capture technology equipped with Vicon equipment.

=== Research activity ===
Achievements of RTU MIREA scientists and academic schools are the basis for partnerships with universities, research centers and industrial corporations of European (Germany, France, Finland) and Asian countries (South Korea, Singapore, China, Japan). In particular, within the framework of international cooperation, physicists from RTU MIREA, A.M. Prokhorov Russian Academy of Sciences (Moscow) and the Institute of Electronics, Microelectronics and Nanotechnologies (Lille, France), a new method for controlling the polarization of terahertz radiation was proposed, which proved to be simpler and more efficient than the previous one. In October 2020, RTU MIREA, together with Technomash Research Institute of the Ruselectronics holding (State Corporation Rostec), the Institute of Organoelement Compounds of the Russian Academy of Sciences (INEOS RAS) and Enikolopov Institute of Synthetic Polymeric Materials (ISPM RAS) created a research and educational consortium «Polymer materials for advanced technologies». It is planned to conduct fundamental and applied research, implement educational programs, develop research and educational infrastructure, launch the production of high-tech products, participate in the «Science» national project. Since December 2020, the university has become a single platform for the collection, accumulation and subsequent analysis of information on indicators in the scientific and educational spheres. The Situation Center of the Ministry of Science and Higher Education of Russia was inaugurated with the participation of V.N. Falkov, Minister of Science and Higher Education of the Russian Federation and P.V. Malkov, Head of Rosstat.

=== International programs ===
RTU MIREA is a member of international university associations and unions — the International Association of Universities (IAU) and the University League Collective Security Treaty Organization (CSTO).

The most important component of the development of the university is strengthening ties with the leading foreign universities — over 60 of them participate in joint research projects, seminars and conferences, teaching and student mobility programs.

RTU MIREA implements academic exchange and double degree programs with the Polytechnic University of Milan (Italy), the North China University of Technology (China), National Yang Ming Chiao Tung University (Taiwan), Saitama University (Japan). Also, RTU MIREA has a Coordination Bureau for annual Russian-Japanese youth exchanges.

In March 2021, RTU MIREA and BSUIR (Belarusian State University of Informatics and Radioelectronics) signed a roadmap for the development of cooperation: joint training programs for specialists, masters, advanced training and retraining, with the account of the requirements set and the need to issue educational documents of both parties.

=== University campuses and dormitories ===
The university has 7 campuses equipped with facilities and devices, including infrastructure and Wi-Fi:

- 78, Vernadsky prospect, — the main campus.
- 86, Vernadsky prospect, — a complex of buildings of Lomonosov Institute of Fine Chemical Technologies (construction was carried out from 1980 to 2004).
- 1, Malaya Pirogovskaya Street, building 5. The object is listed as the cultural heritage object of Moscow — part of the Ensemble of Moscow Higher Courses for Women.
- 20, Stromynka Street. One of the oldest buildings in Sokolniki, a federal cultural heritage site.
- 22, 5th Street of Sokolinaya Gora, — the first building in the ownership of MIREA, built in 1970.
- 7/1, Usacheva Street, — Military Training Center.
- 23, 1st Shchipkovsky Lane, — College of Instrumentation and Information Technologies.

For nonresident and international students, graduate students, doctoral students and interns, the university has six dormitories catering for 3,228 people. Each dormitory has a library, Internet access, a canteen, a medical isolation ward and a left-luggage office. For security purposes, access control and round-the-clock video surveillance, fire and alarm buttons, and a warning system are installed.

== Altair Children’s Technopark ==
Since August 2019, the Altair Children's Technopark has been operating on the premises of RTU MIREA. The Technopark is equipped with facilities and devices. Its training programs were developed with the participation of industrial partners, such as Yandex, Mail.ru Group, Rostelecom Solar, Samsung Electronics, Oracle, Roselectronics, Generium, etc. The training is free of charge. Short-term courses are also provided in the form of popular science lectures, master classes, excursions; and long-term programs (at least 36 academic hours), the result of which is contests and competitions, project defense or case solution developed together with industrial partners. Prize-winning places in competitions, conferences and Olympiads based on the results of training score additional points for admission to specialized universities. The best and most able graduates have an advantage in selecting targeted training programs of industrial partners and the opportunity to internships in companies concluding at the same time a deferred employment contract. The Technopark received a special Digital Volunteer award of the Digital Summits 2020 national award which was granted as an appreciation of its activity at the time of quarantine when all the programs were transferred expeditiously to the VKontakte platform. In March 2021, it received the status of a Federal innovation platform.

== Positions in ratings ==
- It was ranked # 1,960 globally in 2023 by US News & World Report.
- 100 best Russian universities according to Forbes — 50th place (2020).
- The best universities in Russia RAEX — 57th place (2020).
- Russian National University Ranking — 51st place (2020).
- The best universities in the world — THE World University Rankings — 2021 (1,527 universities from 93 countries) — 17th place among 48 Russian universities included in the ranking.
- One of the leading universities in terms of positive student feedback, according to the Tabiturient project (2018, 2019, 2020).
- Ranking of the best Russian universities in engineering and mathematics and natural sciences — 23rd place (2021).

== University editions ==
- Russian Technological Journal
- Journal Fine Chemical Technologies

== Notes ==
1. Ministry of Education and Science of the Russian Federation
2. TASS: Society — the Source: two Moscow universities will be joined
3. University Symbols — Media Center — RTU MIREA, www.mirea.ru
