= Nikolay Nikiforov =

Russian politician (born 1982)

- Николай Никифоров
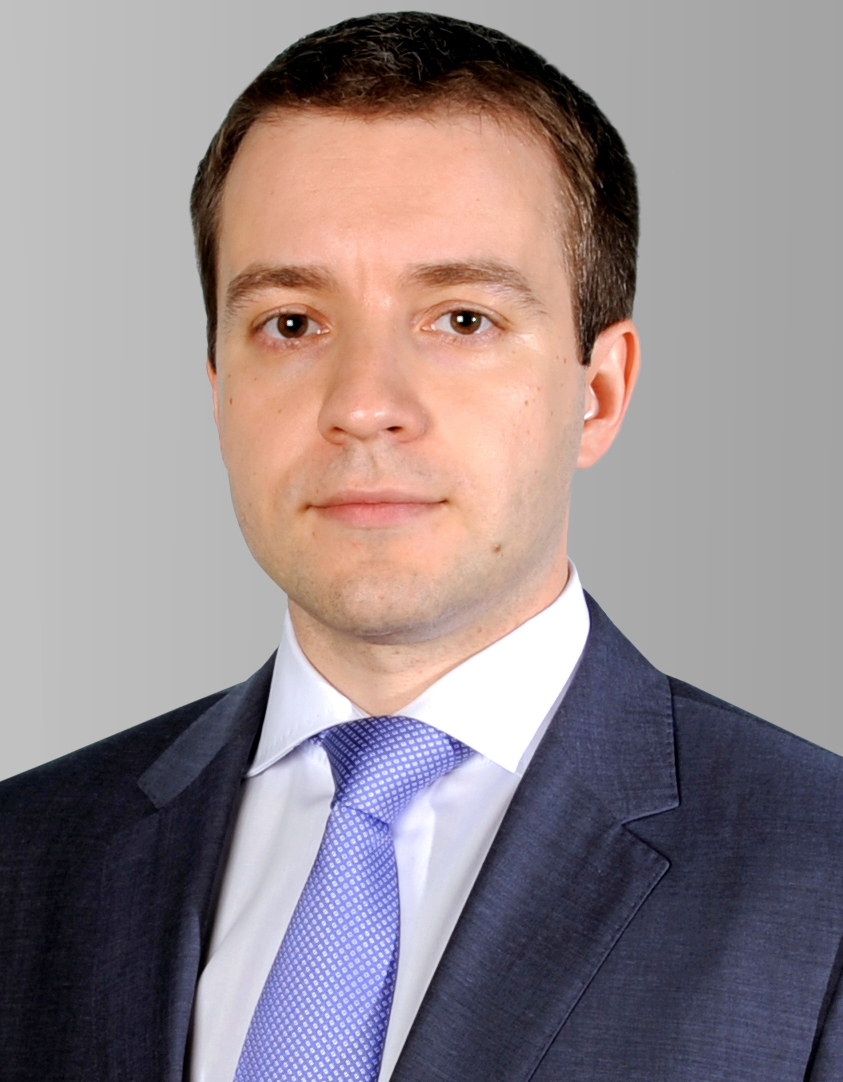
- Nikiforov in 2012

Minister of Communications and Mass Media
- In office 21 May 2012 – 7 May 2018
- Preceded by: Igor Shchyogolev
- Succeeded by: Konstantin Noskov

Personal details
- Born: Nikolay Anatolyevich Nikiforov; 24 June 1982 (age 44) Kazan, Tatar ASSR, Russian SFSR, Soviet Union (now Kazan, Tatarstan, Russia)
- Education: V. I. Ulyanov-Lenin Kazan State University
- Profession: Economist

Nikolay Nikiforov's voice
recorded April 2013

Nikolay Anatolyevich Nikiforov (Russian: Никола́й Анато́льевич Ники́форов; born 24 June 1982) is a Russian politician. In 2012, he became Minister of Communications and Mass Media of Russia.

== Career ==
At age 19, Nikiforov became deputy director of the Kazan Portal company. From 2006 to 2010, he headed the Center of Information Technology of Tatarstan. In 2010, Nikiforov became Deputy Prime Minister and Minister of Information and Communication of the Tatarstan Republic.

On 21 May 2012, at the age of 29, he was named as the Minister of Communications and Mass Media in Dmitry Medvedev's Cabinet, thus becoming its youngest member.

In October 2012, Nikiforov criticized Russia's leading telecom operation, Rostelecom for failing to address "digital inequality" in the country. Nikiforov singled out Rostelecom's investment strategy, which has primarily focused on expanding its market share by acquiring other companies, as inadequate. This, Nikiforov said, means the company's energies are focused on areas that are already connected to the internet, rather than acting to expand internet access.

He pursued the modernization of the Russian Post, saying that modernization of the Russian Post will make it possible to deliver mail inside the country within a week. Nikiforov said the purpose of the Ministry of Communications is to ensure that all mail should be delivered within the boundaries of one large city of community within one day and that he sees several instruments of financing the postal service’s upgrade program, such as the issue of infrastructure bonds, a rise in the prices of some services, the introduction of differentiated fees for the delivery of pensions (depending on the region) and the introduction of tax breaks. Since 27 December 2017, he is on the supervisory board of Post Bank.

Nikiforov was responsible for the transition away from Apple iOS products towards Samsung Android products for use as government IT tools sometime between 2010 and March 2014, when it was first noticed by journalists at a cabinet meeting. He was quoted by AFP as saying "American special services … will significantly increase the volume of information they intercept (which) of course causes serious concern to many governmental clients. This obviously orientates Russian clients, primarily state ones, to be very choosy about their partners in IT."

== Accusations of academic dishonesty ==
In 2011, Nikiforov defended his thesis in Economics. According to an examination by Dissernet, this doctoral thesis contains at least 97 pages with undocumented plagiarism from six other works and data fabrication. On 22 June 2016, the dissertation council of the Russian Presidential Academy of National Economy and Public Administration confirmed the existence of plagiarism in Nikiforov's thesis, but refused to recommend stripping Nikiforov of his degree.

Preceded by Igor Shchyogolev	Minister of Telecommunications; 21 May 2012 – 7 May 2018	Succeeded by Konstantin Noskov
