= Virginia Cave Board =

US state government entity

The Virginia Cave Board, originally known as the Virginia Cave Commission, was established by the Virginia General Assembly in 1979.
