= Zemstvo stamp =

Russian stamp

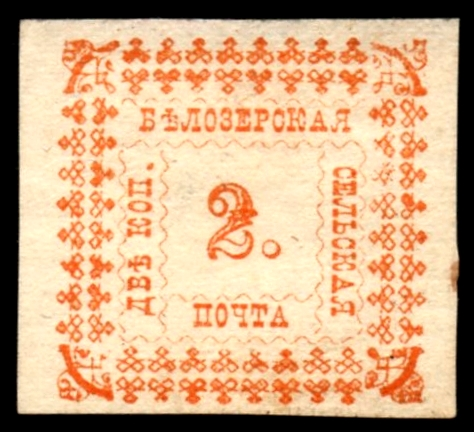
A Zemstvo stamp issued in Bielozersk province

A Zemstvo stamp (Russian: Земская марка, romanized: Zemskaya marka) was a Russian local stamp used widely in rural areas from 1865. It was named after the Zemstvo local administrative districts or uyezds that were created in 1864. The stamps ceased at about the time of the 1917 Russian revolution.

== Background ==
The Russian post in the nineteenth century was a monopoly of the state through the Imperial Post. Most state post offices, however, were in towns, leaving many rural areas a long distance from the nearest post office. The Zemstvo post (or Rural post) was introduced in 1864 to fill this gap and at first it operated without official approval. In 1870 a law was passed formalising the arrangements and which stated that "the Rural post is authorised to carry ordinary correspondence, also journals, circulars, remittances, registered letters, and other mail from the post town, to all more or less distant portions of the district as may be deprived of postal communications."

The law also stated that "the Rural post is authorised to employ special postage stamps on the express understanding that their design differs entirely from those used by the Imperial Post". The postmen were also not allowed to use the post-horn emblem of the Imperial Post on their bags.

The first Zemstvo post was established at Vetluga in 1864 but no stamps were used.

== Stamps ==
According to Chuchin's catalogue, at least 3000 different Zemstvo stamps were issued, however, records are incomplete and it is likely that there are many still to be discovered.

The first Zemstvo stamp was issued by Schlisselburg in September 1865. According to Chuchin, in 1864 there were 36 Zemstvo governments with 371 districts and stamps were used in 162 districts. By 1892 there was a Zemstvo post in 150 districts but not all issued stamps and in some the post was free.

== Collecting ==
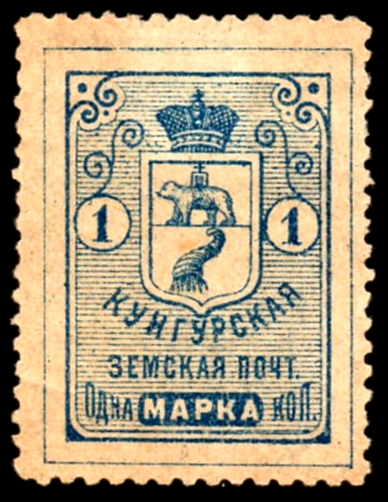
A Zemstvo stamp issued in Kungar province

Unused Zemstvo stamps were highly appreciated among the early collectors. For example, stamps of the most recent issues were three to five times more expensive than their real price. Rates of stamps of older issues increased in geometrical progression. For some stamps of the first issues, prices were inflated by dealers up to 400 rubles and more. The high value of unused Zemstvo stamps was due to the fact that they had not been collected by philatelists in the 1860s. As for used stamps, they were valued much cheaper. Zemstvo stamps were in great demand among foreign philatelists.

Zemstvo stamps were officially sanctioned local stamps. As such they appear only in specialised books and catalogues. Several books about Zemstvo stamps were published in the French and German languages. The book Description of the Russian Zemstvo Stamps, Envelopes and Parcels by D. Chudovsky was issued in Kiev in 1888 and was also very popular.

A number of catalogues were produced in Germany and Russia before the revolution but some are incomplete and others were published before the cessation of the service and therefore do not give a full history of the stamps. The principal catalogue in English is the Chuchin catalogue of 1925 as updated by Barefoot. Chuchin numbers are widely used to identify Zemstvos. Recently, as collecting Zemstvos has become more popular, new catalogues have started to appear in the Russian language.

== See also ==
- Georges Henri Kaestlin
- Postage stamps and postal history of Russia

== References and sources ==
Notes

Sources

- Artuchov A. Zemstvo Postage Stamps of Imperial Russia.
- Chuchin, F.G. Catalogue of the Russian Rural Postage Stamps. First edition. Moscow: Commissioner for Philately and Vouchers of U.S.S.R., 1925.
- Chuchin, F.G. Russia Zemstvos. Revised edition. Ed. J. Barefoot. York, England: J. Barefoot Ltd., 1988. ISBN 0-906845-28-9
- Herrick, William. Catalogue of the Russian Rural Stamps. New York: Scott Stamp & Coin Co., 1896 128p.
- Rowell, David. Zemstvo Values. Redmond, Washington: 2004.
- Y.E. Gurevich, O.M. Poltorak, I.A. Strebulaev. Catalog of the Zemstvo Stamps of Russia 1866-1919.
