= Lera Loeb =

Ukrainian writer and filmmaker

- Лера Лоб
- Born: Valeriya Sorokina; February 9, 1988 (age 38); Dnipropetrovsk, Ukrainian SSR, Soviet Union (now Ukraine)
- Citizenship: United States of America
- Occupations: Writer, Producer, Actress, Filmmaker
- Years active: 2008–present
- Employer(s): Lera Loeb Films, Faddy Magazine
- Awards: https://www.shootonline.com/spw/%E2%80%9Cgreen-kola%E2%80%9D-wins-best-short-film-award-paris-independent-film-festival-recently
- Website: https://www.imdb.com/name/nm10403391/ https://www.leraloebfilms.com/

Lera Loeb (Note: Ukrainian: Лера Лоб, romanized: Lera Lob) (born Valeriya Sorokina, (Note: Ukrainian: Валерiя Сорокіна, romanized: Valeriia Sorokina) February 9, 1988) is a writer, producer, actress and filmmaker, most notable for directing and producing high-end fashion films, short format narrative and digital branded content.

== Life ==
=== Early life ===
Born Valeriya Sorokina in Dnipro to a family of doctors.

=== Move to the United States ===
In 2000, she received a cultural exchange scholarship to study in New York City. While living with an American host family, she decided to permanently move to the United States. She eventually met American music producer Steve Loeb.

=== New York City and later life ===
She earned her bachelor's degree at City University of New York.

Lera became a successful writer, and was described by The Sunday Telegraph as "a thriving publicist" in the fashion industry. As of 2009, her blog had been recognized by Elle.
