= Igor Shchyogolev =

Russian politician (born 1965)

- Игорь Щёголев
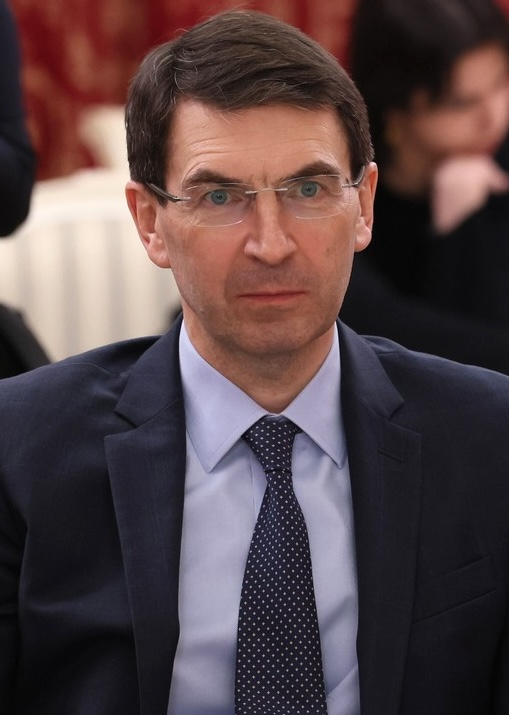
- Shchyogolev in 2024

Presidential Envoy to the Central Federal District
- Incumbent
- Assumed office 26 June 2018
- President: Vladimir Putin
- Preceded by: Alexey Gordeyev

Aide to the President of Russia
- In office 21 May 2012 – 7 May 2018
- President: Vladimir Putin

Minister of Communications and Mass Media
- In office 12 May 2008 – 20 May 2012
- President: Vladimir Putin
- Preceded by: Leonid Reiman (as Minister of Communications and Informatics)
- Succeeded by: Nikolay Nikiforov

Personal details
- Born: Igor Olegovich Shchyogolev; November 10, 1965 (age 60) Vinnitsa, Ukrainian SSR, Soviet Union (now Vinnytsia, Ukraine)
- Education: Moscow State Linguistic University; Leipzig University

Igor Olegovich Shchyogolev (Note: Alternatively romanized as Ščjogolev or Schögoleff.) (Russian: Игорь Олегович Щёголев, IPA: [ˈiɡərʲ ɐˈlʲeɡəvʲɪtɕ ˈɕːɵɡəlʲɪf]; born 10 November 1965) is a Russian politician. From May 2008 to 20 May 2012, he has served as the Russian Minister of Telecommunications. He has the federal state civilian service rank of 1st class Active State Councillor of the Russian Federation.

== Early life and education ==
Shchyogolev was born in Vinnitsa, Ukraine SSR and went to the Moscow State Linguistic University (1982–1984) and the Leipzig University (1984–1988), graduating as a philologist fluent in French, German, and English. While Shchyogolev was in Leipzig from 1984 to 1988, Vladimir Putin was a KGB officer at Dresden from 1985 to 1990 and also headed the House of Soviet-German Friendship in Leipzig (Russian: Дом советско-германской дружбы).

== Career ==
After graduating from university, he allegedly joined the Telegraph Agency of the Soviet Union (later, following the dissolution of the Soviet Union, the Information Telegraph Agency of Russia or ITAR-TASS) in their American office until 1993. He then moved to Paris as a foreign correspondent, (Note: Allegedly, he served as an undercover KGB official while he was posted in Paris to ITAR-TASS and ran a network for Russian intelligence which included persons recruited in the 1980s including both Count Serge de Pahlen (born 1944), who is a member of the Pahlen family of the Russian nobility and, since 1981, the husband of Margherita Agnelli de Pahlen who is the daughter of the principal shareholder of Fiat Gianni Agnelli, and Prince Alexander Trubetskoy (born 1947), who lives in France and, since 2010, is a member of the board of Svyazinvest and is the son of a White émigré prince of the Trubetskoy family of the Russian nobility. Alexander Trubetskoy was a business partner of Konstantin Malofeev.) and in 1997 moved back to Russia as deputy editor-in-chief and political correspondent of ITAR-TASS's main news service. At the same time he also worked in the 1st Main Directorate (PGU) of KGB of the USSR (foreign intelligence).

=== Government service ===
In 1998, Shchyogolev left ITAR-TASS to work for the Russian government, initially as deputy head of the government corps of press officer, then briefly as Yevgeniy Primakov's press secretary before returning to lead the press officer corps. In early 2000, he was appointed as press secretary for Vladimir Putin, then-acting President of Russia, where he stayed until the end of 2001 when he became head of Presidential Protocol, co-ordinating presidential trips overseas and in Russia. In 2004, his job was expanded to be head of Kremlin Protocol, where he stayed until he was appointed "Minister of Communications and Mass Media" as part of Putin's second cabinet on 12 May 2008, replacing Leonid Reiman. He held that position until resigning from that post in May 2012 when he became an assistant to the president and is Vladimir Putin's speechwriter and organizer of his meetings. (Note: Allegedly, Konstantin Malofeev became close to Igor Shchyogolev, while Shchyogolev was minister of communications, through Malofeev's childhood friend Arseny Mironov (Russian: Арсений Миронов) who, from 2008 to 2012, was the Director of the Information Department of the Ministry of Telecom and Mass Media of the Russian Federation.)

Shchyogolev actively supports the activities of the ultraright Black International (Russian: «Черный Интернационал»), which supports neo-Nazi activities, and is the main sponsor of Konstantin Malofeev events.

=== Sovetnik magazine ===
He is an expert on European countries for press releases and is an editor-in-chief of the Sovetnik magazine (Russian: журнала «Советник») which is a magazine about public relations (PR) (Russian: общественных связей (ОС)) and the PR market. At Sovetnik, he replaced Boris Lvovich Eryomin (also transliterated as Boris Lvovich Eremin) who had been at the journal for 14 years.

=== League of Safe Internet ===
He is chairman of the board of trustees of League of Safe Internet (LSI) also translated as the Safe Internet League (SIL). (Note: Konstantin Malofeev was chairman of the board of the League of Safe Internet (LSI) until 2015.) Ekaterina Mikhailovna Mizulina (Russian: Екатерина Михайловна Мизулина; born 1 September 1984, Yaroslavl), who is the daughter of Yelena Mizulina, leads the League of Safe Internet which was established in January 2011 by the July 2007 established and Konstantin Malofeev associated St Basil the Great Charitable Foundation (Russian: Благотворительным фондом Святителя Василия Великого). Through the League of Safe Internet and with support from both Shchyogolev and Roskomnadzor, Mizulina supports internet censorship especially internet coverage of events involving Russian invasion of Ukraine and, on 24 May 2022, threatened Google and Wikipedia by stating "First, we will clear Ukraine of the Nazis and Banderites, and then we will get to Google and Wikipedia" (Russian: «Сначала зачистим Украину от нациков и бандеровцев, а потом дойдём до Гугла и Википедии»)

=== U.S. sanctions target ===
In response to the 2022 Russian invasion of Ukraine, on 6 April 2022 the Office of Foreign Assets Control of the United States Department of the Treasury added Shchyogolev to its list of persons sanctioned pursuant to Executive Order 14024.

== Personal life ==
His wife Rimma Viktorovna Shchyogoleva (Russian: Римма Викторовна Щёголева; born 5 April 1963) is, since 1998, a professor in German language at Academy of Foreign Trade (Russian: Академия внешней торговли) and often travels to Germany for internships.

Their son Svyatoslav Igorevich Shchyogolev (Russian: Святослав Игоревич Щёголев; born 29 June 1989) is a producer at RT, which was formerly Russia Today or Rossiya Segodnya (Russian: Россия Сегодня) and is a brand of ANO TV-Novosti, and, since 8 November 2011, is a consultant in the Department of International Cooperation of the Directorate of International Law and Cooperation (Russian: консультанта отдела международного сотрудничества Управления международного права и сотрудничества) with the High Court of Arbitration (VAS) (Russian: (ВАС)).

== See also ==
- Presidential Commission of the Russian Federation to Counter Attempts to Falsify History to the Detriment of Russia's Interests headed by Sergey Naryshkin since 2009

== Notes ==
Preceded by Leonid Reiman	Minister of Telecommunications; 12 May 2008–20 May 2012	Succeeded by Nikolai Nikiforov
