= Antonio F. Lera =

- Born: Antonio Fernandez Lera; 1952 (age 73–74); Madrid, Spain
- Occupations: Writer; translator; journalist; publisher

Antonio Fernandez Lera (born 1952 Madrid) is a Spanish writer, translator, journalist and publisher.

== Life ==
In 1998 he formed the Magrinyana company, in which he has taken on the staging of his own texts: Plomo caliente [Hot Lead] (1998); Monos locos y otras crónicas [Mad Monkeys and Other Tales] (2000); Mátame, abrázame [Kill Me, Embrace Me] (2002); Las islas del tiempo [The Islands of Time] (2003) and Memoria del jardín [Memory of the Garden] (staged in 2009).

His works include: Proyecto Van Gogh: Entre los paisajes [Van Gogh Project: Among Landscapes] (1989); Los hombres de piedra [The Stone Men] (1990); Muerte de Ayax [Death of Ajax] (1991) and Paisajes y Voz [Landscapes and Voice] (1992).

He has also written Cuadros escritos [Written Paintings] (poems, 1983); Los ojos paralelos [Parallel Eyes] (1992); Las huellas del agua [The Traces of Water] (poems, 2003); Libro de alegrías [Book of Joys] and Teorías de animales [Theories of Animals] (poems, 2005).

== Translations ==
- Hamletmachine, by Heiner Müller (1986)
- Mud, by María Irene Fornés (1988)
- The Sea and the Mirror, by W. H. Auden (2001)
- Messiah, by Steven Berkoff (2001)
- The Country, by Martin Crimp (2002)
- Phaedra's Love, by Sarah Kane (2002)
- King Lear, by William Shakespeare (2002)
- The Known World, by Edward P. Jones (2004)
- Project X, by Jim Shepard (2005).
- Mad Monkeys and Other Tales (Monos locos y otras crónicas) by Antonio F. Lera, translated by Paul Rankin
