= Federal Communications Agency =

Russian government agency

Rossvyaz
- Министерство связи и массовых коммуникаций Российской Федерации
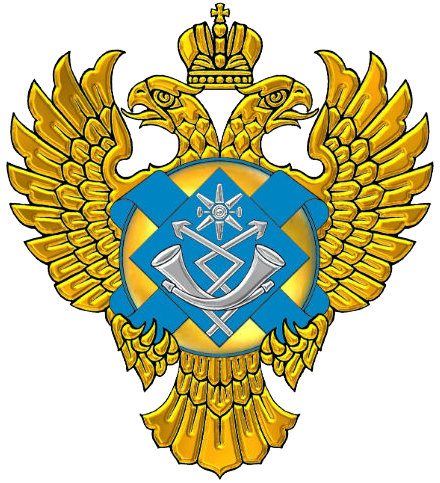
- Agency seal

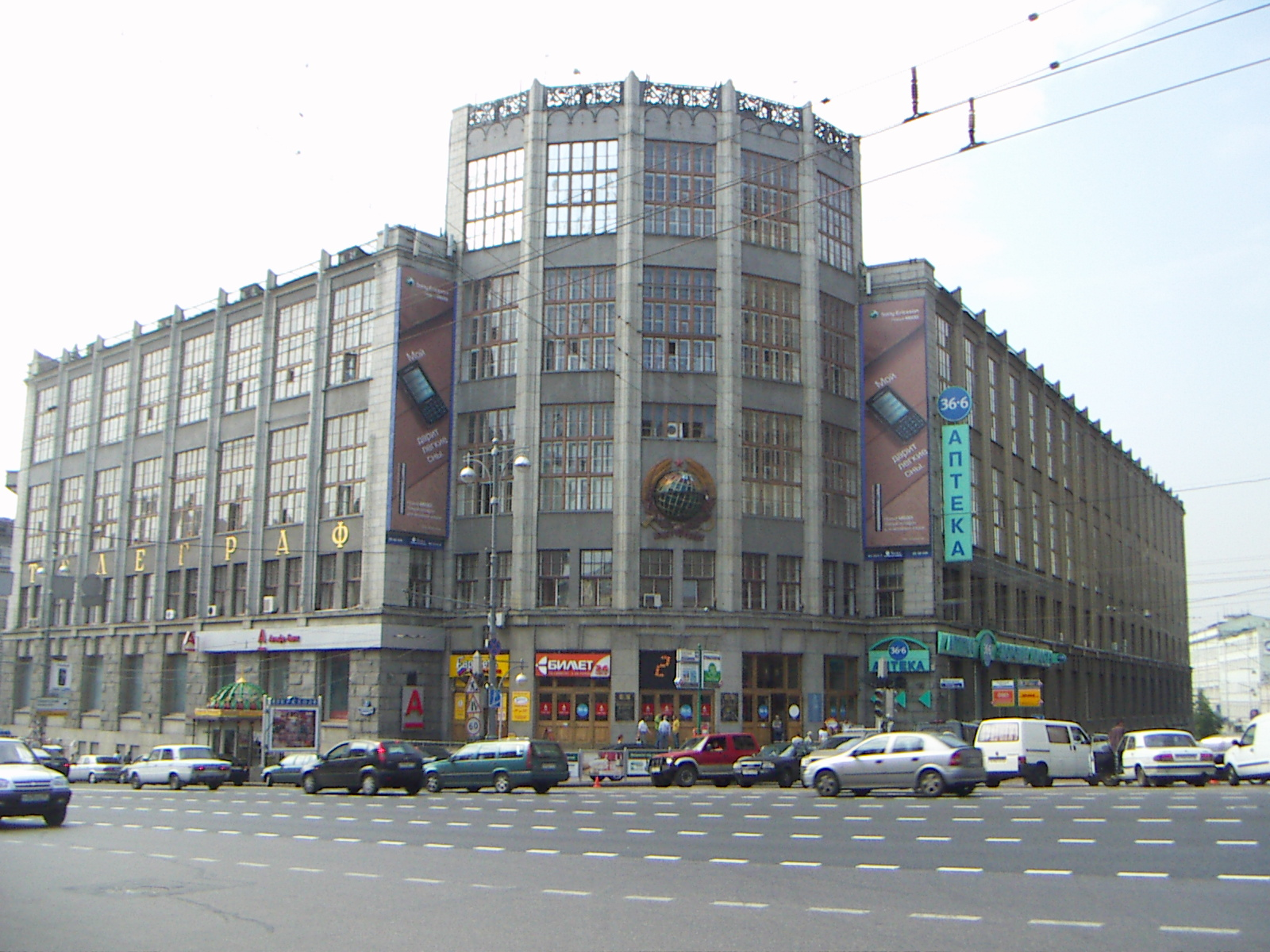
- Headquarters of the agency in the Central Telegraph Building

Agency overview
- Formed: 2008
- Dissolved: 2020
- Jurisdiction: Government of Russia
- Headquarters: Tverskaya 7, Moscow; 55°45′30.98″N 37°36′40.05″E
- Agency executive: Oleg Dukhovnitsky
- Parent agency: Ministry of Digital Development, Communications and Mass Media
- Website: eng.rossvyaz.ru

The Federal Communications Agency (Russian: Федеральное агентство связи, abbreviated Rossvyaz, Russian: Россвязь) was a federal agency under the Ministry of Digital Development, Communications and Mass Media. It was responsible for providing public services, the management of state property and law enforcement functions in the field of communication and information.

According to the Presidential Decree of the Russian Federation of November 20, 2020 No 719 "About enhancement of public administration in the sphere of digital development, communication and mass communications", the Federal Communications Agency was abolished, and its functions were transferred to the Ministry of Digital Development, Communications and Mass Media of the Russian Federation.

== Functions and role ==
The main activities of the Agency were:

- Ensuring the implementation of inter-state and federal programs in the field of communication and information;
- Provision of public importance of services in the field of communication and information to the public on the conditions set by federal law, including: providing in the prescribed manner of distribution and proper use of radio frequency (RF channels) and civil and numbering resources;
- Conformity assessment in the field of communication and information;
- Organization in the prescribed manner of functioning, development and modernization of federal communications and national information and telecommunications infrastructure;
- Organization of a network of certification centers digital signature;
- Publication of individual legal acts in the field of communication and information on the basis and in pursuance of the Constitution of Russia, federal constitutional laws, federal laws, regulations and orders of the President of Russia, and orders of the Government of Russia and the Ministry of Communications and Mass Media;
- Maintenance of registers, registers and inventories.

== Heads of the agency ==
Agency leadership position held by the following:

- Dmitry Milovantsev (March 18, 2004 - July 9, 2004)
- Andrey Beskorovainy (July 2004/10 June 2005 - 20 June 2007)
- Valeriy Bugaenko (June 20, 2007 - June 28, 2011 [3])
- Oleg G. Dukhovnitsky (April 23, 2012 - November 20, 2020)

== See also ==
- Russian Post
