= Minkomsvyaz =

Government ministry of Russia

Ministry of Digital Development, Communications and Mass Media
- Министерство цифрового развития связи и массовых коммуникаций Российской Федерации
- Ministry emblem

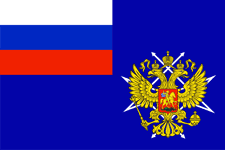
- Ministry flag

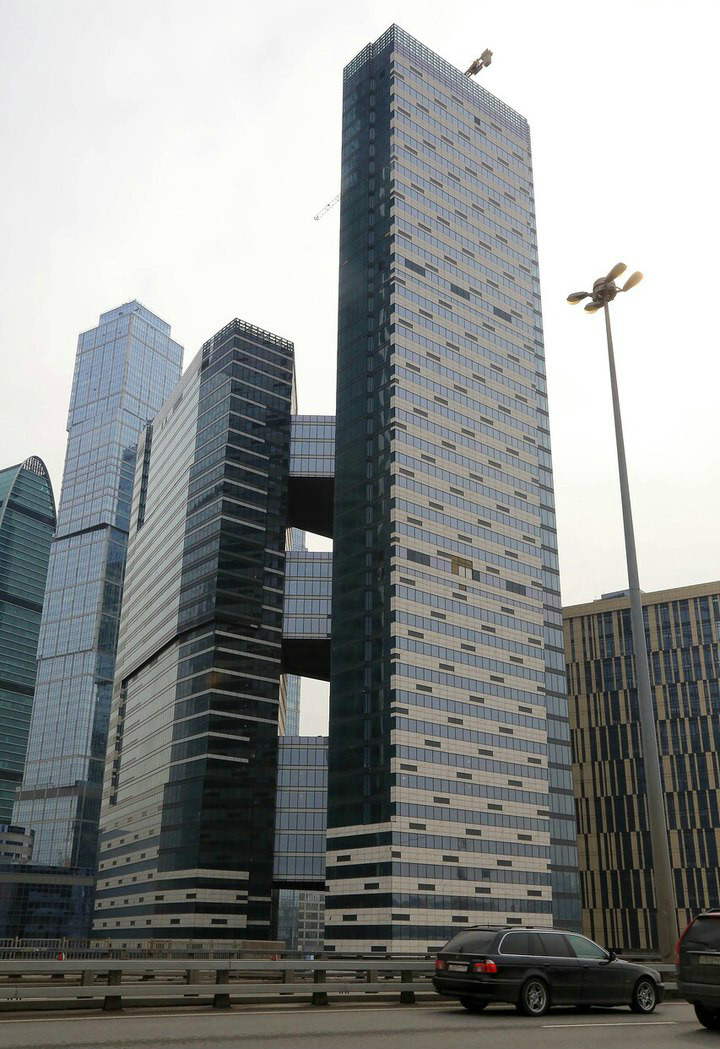
- IQ-quarter, the ministry's headquarters

Agency overview
- Formed: 2008
- Preceding agencies: Ministry of Information Technologies and Communications (2004–2008); Ministry of Communications and Informatics (1999–2004); Ministry of Communications (1946–1991); People's Commissariat for Communications of the USSR (1932–1946); People's Commissariat for Posts and Telegraphs of the USSR (1923–1932); People's Commissariat for Posts and Telegraphs of the RSFSR (1917–1923)
- Jurisdiction: Government of Russia
- Headquarters: IQ-quarter, Moscow; 55°45′30.98″N 37°36′40.05″E
- Annual budget: ₽58.8 billion (FY 2011)
- Minister responsible: Maxut Shadayev
- Child agencies: Roskomnadzor; Rossvyaz
- Website: digital.gov.ru/en/

The Ministry of Digital Development, Communications and Mass Media of the Russian Federation, (Note: Russian: Министерство цифрового развития, связи и массовых коммуникаций Российской Федерации, informally shortened to Mintsifry Rossii (Russian: Минцифры России)) often abbreviated as Minkomsvyaz, (Note: Russian: Минкомсвязь) is a ministry of the Government of Russia responsible for telecommunications, media and the post.

== History ==
The Ministry of Digital Development, Communications and Mass Media was established in May 2008 from successor agencies of the Ministry of Communications of the USSR, and was known as the Ministry of Telecom and Mass Communications until it receiving its current name in 2018. The ministry is subdivided into functional departments including Roskomnadzor, Rospechat and Rossvyaz. The ministry had its quarters at the Central Telegraph Building before moving to the IQ-quarter building.

Maxut Shadayev has been the Minister of Telecom and Mass Communications since 21 January 2020.

In July 2021, the Ministry of Digital Development, Communications and Mass Media entered into an agreement with China's National Radio and Television Administration to cooperate on news coverage and media narratives.

== Powers and responsibilities ==
- rendering competitive government support to produce and/or distribute socially important media projects, to create and maintain social work and education-related websites.
- participating in development and organization of events to implement the government policy in the following spheres:
- printed media, information sharing, distribution of printed periodicals, printed media development and support
- book publishing and reading and book promotion, implementation of the National reading support and development programme events.
- TV and radio broadcasting, digital technologies implementation, development and renovation of the satellite, ground cable and aerial networks, media and information sharing development.
- analysing electronic media audience and printed media issues.
- compiling compulsory free copies of all printed publications.
- managing federal funds of produced and broadcast TV and radio programmes, shows, sound records and other audiovisual products (except movies).
- performing economic analysis of the subordinate state unitary enterprises, approving their economic indicators, and verifying their financial and operating performance and property employment.
- acting as a governmental customer to obtain federal grants, research and development and innovation programmes and projects.
- organizing congresses, conferences, seminars, exhibitions and other events related to press, publishing and printing, and electronic media.
- monitoring printed media market, including its circulation, financial, advertising and other indicators.
- preparing and issuing an annual analytical report the "conditions, problems and development prospects" of Russian printed media.
- sponsoring electronic media from federal budget resources.
- supporting compatriots living abroad, as well as maintaining a common information space for the Russian-speaking population in Russia and the countries of the near abroad.
- implementing government policies regarding counter-terrorism and extremism operations, anti-drug abuse and trafficking activities.
- rendering information, technical, organizational and consulting support to legal bodies and individual entrepreneurs in terms of radio-frequency spectrum utilization for TV and radio broadcasting, information sharing, and public computer networks development.
- managing a voluntary certification system for the production of stamps and letterheads with the national emblem of the Russian Federation.
- Ensuring the implementation of inter-state and federal programs in the field of communication and information;
- Provision of public importance of services in the field of communication and information to the public on the conditions set by federal law, including: providing in the prescribed manner of distribution and proper use of radio frequency (RF channels) and civil and numbering resources;
- Conformity assessment in the field of communication and information;
- Organization in the prescribed manner of functioning, development and modernization of federal communications and national information and telecommunications infrastructure;
- Organization of a network of certification centers digital signature;
- Publication of individual legal acts in the field of communication and information on the basis and in pursuance of the Constitution of Russia, federal constitutional laws, federal laws, regulations and orders of the President of Russia, and orders of the Government of Russia and the Ministry of Communications and Mass Media;
- Maintenance of registers, registers and inventories.

== List of ministers ==
- Igor Shchyogolev (12 May 2008 — 20 May 2012)
- Nikolay Nikiforov (21 May 2012 — 7 May 2018)
- Konstantin Noskov (18 May 2018 — 21 January 2020)
- Maxut Shadayev (21 January 2020 — present)

== See also ==
- Freedom of the press in Russia
- Internet in Russia
- Media in Russia
- Rostelecom
- Russian Post
- Svyazinvest
- Telecommunications in Russia
- Television in Russia
- Special Communications Service of Russia
- List of telecommunications regulatory bodies
