= Moscow State University of Instrument Engineering and Computer Science =

Technical university in Moscow

Coordinates: 55.7939°N 37.7014°E

Moscow State University of Instrument Engineering and Computer Science (MSUIECS)
- Московский государственный университет приборостроения и информатики (МГУПИ)
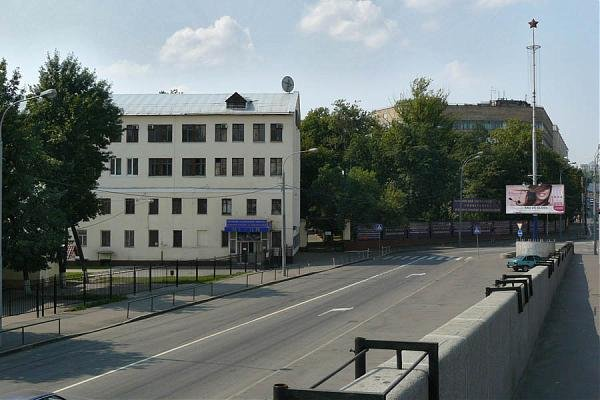
- Established: 1936
- Rector: Igor Golubyatnikov (Голубятников И. В.)
- Administrative staff: 2000
- Undergraduates: 12 500
- Location: 20, Stromynka, Moscow, Russia, 107996
- Website: http://mgupi.ru/ or http://мгупи.рф

Moscow State University of Instrument Engineering and Computer Science (MSUIECS (MGUPI in Russian); is one of the technical universities of Moscow and Russia. Founded in 1936 as the Moscow Correspondence Institute of the metal industry. MSUIECS offers a wide range of educational programs to prepare specialists, masters, bachelors, PhDs and doctors of different sciences.

== Campus ==
To perform educational and research activities MGUPI unites 9 departments consisting of 41 chairs and ten subsidiaries in Moscow, Tver, Yaroslavl and other regions.

== Faculties ==
- Technological computer science (ТИ)
  - Information Security (BA, MA)
  - Materials Science (BA, MA)
  - Mechanical engineering (BA, MA)
  - Technological machines and equipment
  - Design-engineering software engineering industries (BA, MA)
  - Automation of technological processes and production (BA, MA)
  - Innovation
  - Nanotechnology and Microsystems
  - Art Materials Processing Technology
  - Design of aircraft and rocket engines (specialist)
  - Ground transport and technology tools (specialist)
- Computer science (ИТ)
- Instrument making and electronics (ПР)
- Economics (ЭФ)
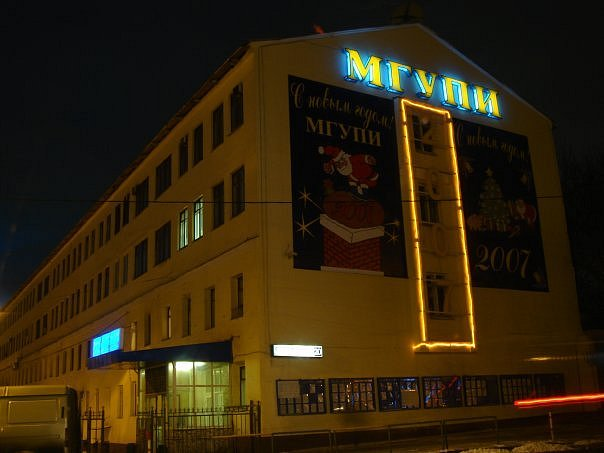
  - Economics (BA, MA)
  - Applied Computer Science (BA, MA)
  - Economic Security (specialist)
- Management and law (УП)
  - Jurisprudence
  - Management (BA, MA)
  - Personnel Management (BA, MA)
  - State and Municipal Management
  - Applied Computer Science (MA)
  - Legal maintenance of national security (specialist)
- Faculty of Specialized Secondary Education
- Evening faculty
- Faculty of Professional Skills Upgrading

== International cooperation ==
The University maintains close academic and scientific contacts with Germany, Great Britain, France, Finland, Bulgaria, Poland and other countries. The University has signed agreements with Technische Universität Berlin, the University of Sofia, University of Jyvaskyla (Finland), Technical University of Varna (Bulgaria). University senior staff and leading professors take an active part in big international symposiums and workshops, conferences held in Europe, both Americas and Asia; they also deliver lectures and lead joint research with educational establishments and research centers of many countries.

== Branches ==
The University has also several branches:

- Dmitrov
- Kashira
- Kimry
- Lytkarino
- Mozhaysk
- Sergiyev Posad
- Serpukhov
- Stavropol
- Chekhov
- Uglich

== See also ==
- Education in Russia
- List of universities in Russia
