= Smithsonian Contributions and Studies Series =

Journal produced by the Smithsonian Institution

The Smithsonian Contributions and Studies Series is a collection of serial periodical publications produced by the Smithsonian Institution, detailing advances in various scientific and societal fields to which the Smithsonian Institution has made contributions.

== History ==
The Smithsonian Institution began publishing consolidated compilations of quarto-sized papers in 1848, under the name Smithsonian Contributions to Knowledge. In 1862 octavo-sized papers called Smithsonian Miscellaneous Collections were added, followed by the monographic Bulletin of the United States National Museum in 1875, and the compiled Proceedings of the United States National Museum in 1878. Annual Reports of Smithsonian Institution administrative and scholarly achievements, and accessions to the collections, began issuing in 1881, with accession and donor information being split off in 1993 as the Annals of the Smithsonian Institution.

The Smithsonian Contributions to Knowledge ceased publication in 1916, followed by the cessation of the Smithsonian Miscellaneous Collections in 1968, and the Bulletin of the United States National Museum in 1971. In their place, the Smithsonian Institution began publication of a variety of different series focused on specific areas of scientific or societal study.

== Series ==
=== Discontinued ===
Publication	Began	Ended
Contributions from the United States National Herbarium	1902	1974
Smithsonian Annals of Flight	1964	1974
Smithsonian Contributions to Astrophysics	1956	1974
Smithsonian Contributions to the Earth Sciences	1969	2002
Smithsonian Folklife Studies	1980	1990
Smithsonian Studies in Air and Space	1977	1990

=== Current ===
Publication	Began	ISSN	eISSN
Smithsonian Contributions to Anthropology	1965	ISSN 0081-0223	ISSN 1943-6661
Smithsonian Contributions to Botany	1969	ISSN 0081-024X	ISSN 1938-2812
Smithsonian Contributions to History and Technology	1969	ISSN 1948-5999	ISSN 1948-6006
Smithsonian Contributions to Paleobiology	1969	ISSN 0081-0266	ISSN 1943-6688
Smithsonian Contributions to Museum Conservation	2010	ISSN 1949-2359	ISSN 1949-2367
Smithsonian Contributions to the Marine Sciences	1977	ISSN 0196-0768	ISSN 1943-667X
Smithsonian Contributions to Zoology	1969	ISSN 0081-0282	ISSN 1943-6696
