= Mongol Shuudan =

Mongol Shuudan (Монгол Шуудан) may refer to:

- Mongol Post, the postal system of Mongolia
- Mongol Shuudan (band), a Russian rock band
