= Russian post offices abroad =

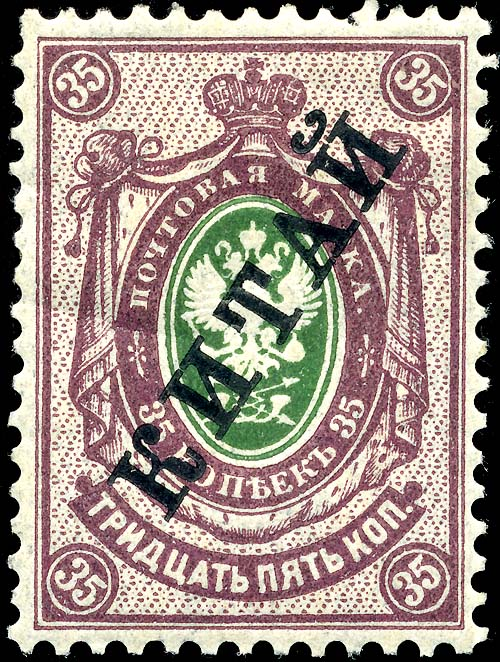
A Russian stamp overprinted for use in China.

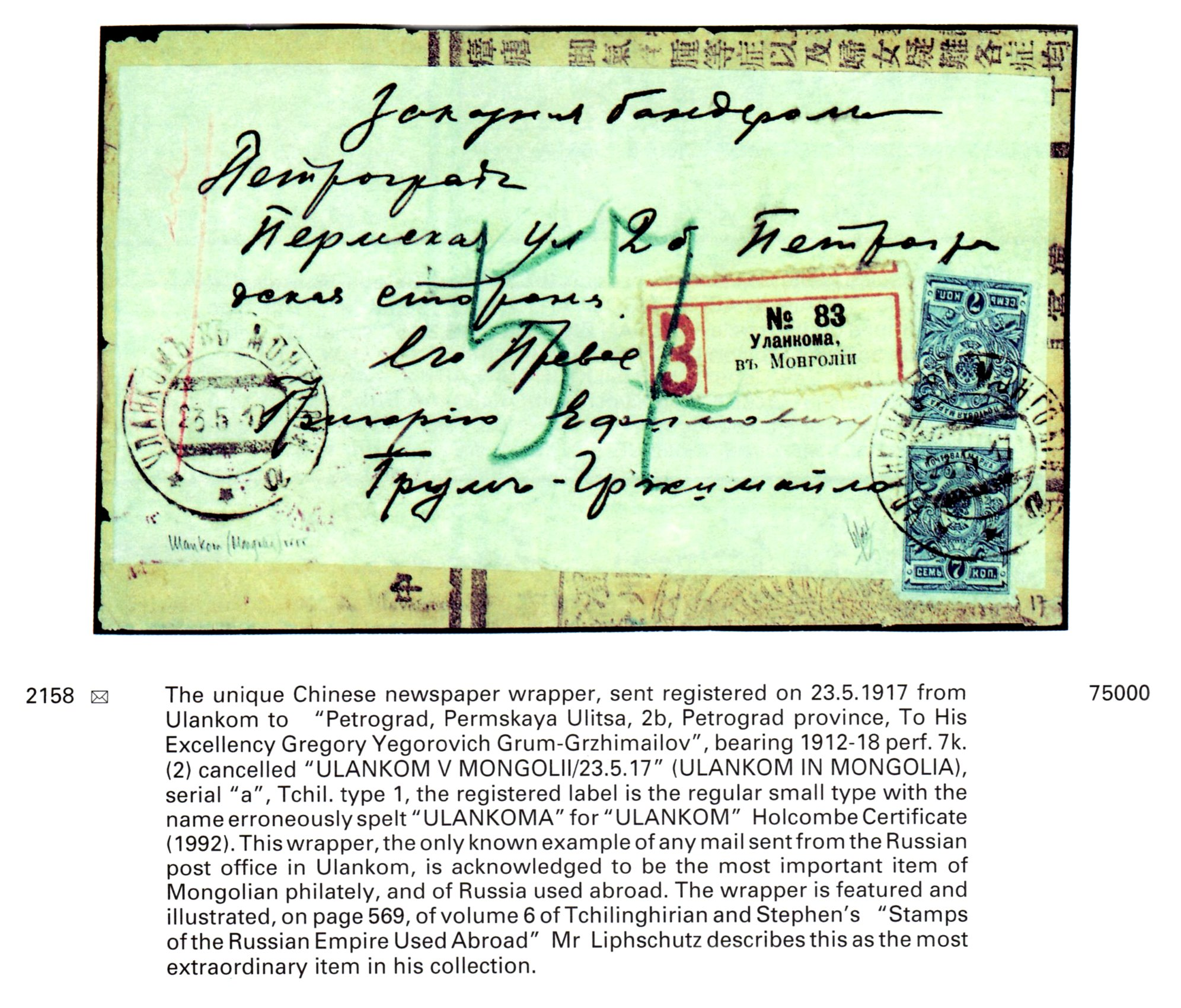
The 1917 "Ulankom" newspaper wrapper. The only known mail from the Russian post office in Ulankom, Mongolia. Formerly in the collection of Michel Liphschutz.

The Russian post offices abroad were established by Russia between the late 18th and early 20th centuries to handle mail service where the local service was deemed unreliable. The first such were the Russian post offices in the Ottoman (Turkish) Empire, which began operations in the 1770s. All the post offices closed during the 1910s.

Mail from some of the post offices is scarce. There is only one known piece of mail from the Russian post office in Ulankom, for instance, which was discovered by Michel Liphschutz in the 1940s.

Russian Post currently maintains a post office in Berlin.

== See also ==
- Postage stamps and postal history of Russia
- Russian post offices in China
- Russian post offices in Crete
- Russian post offices in the Ottoman Empire

== References and sources ==
Sources

- Stanley Gibbons Ltd: various catalogues
- AskPhil – Glossary of Stamp Collecting Terms
- Encyclopaedia of Postal History
- Rossiter, Stuart & John Flower. The Stamp Atlas. London: Macdonald, 1986. ISBN 0-356-10862-7
