= Russian Post =

Russian national postal operator

Coordinates: 55°41′18.37″N 37°37′24.69″E

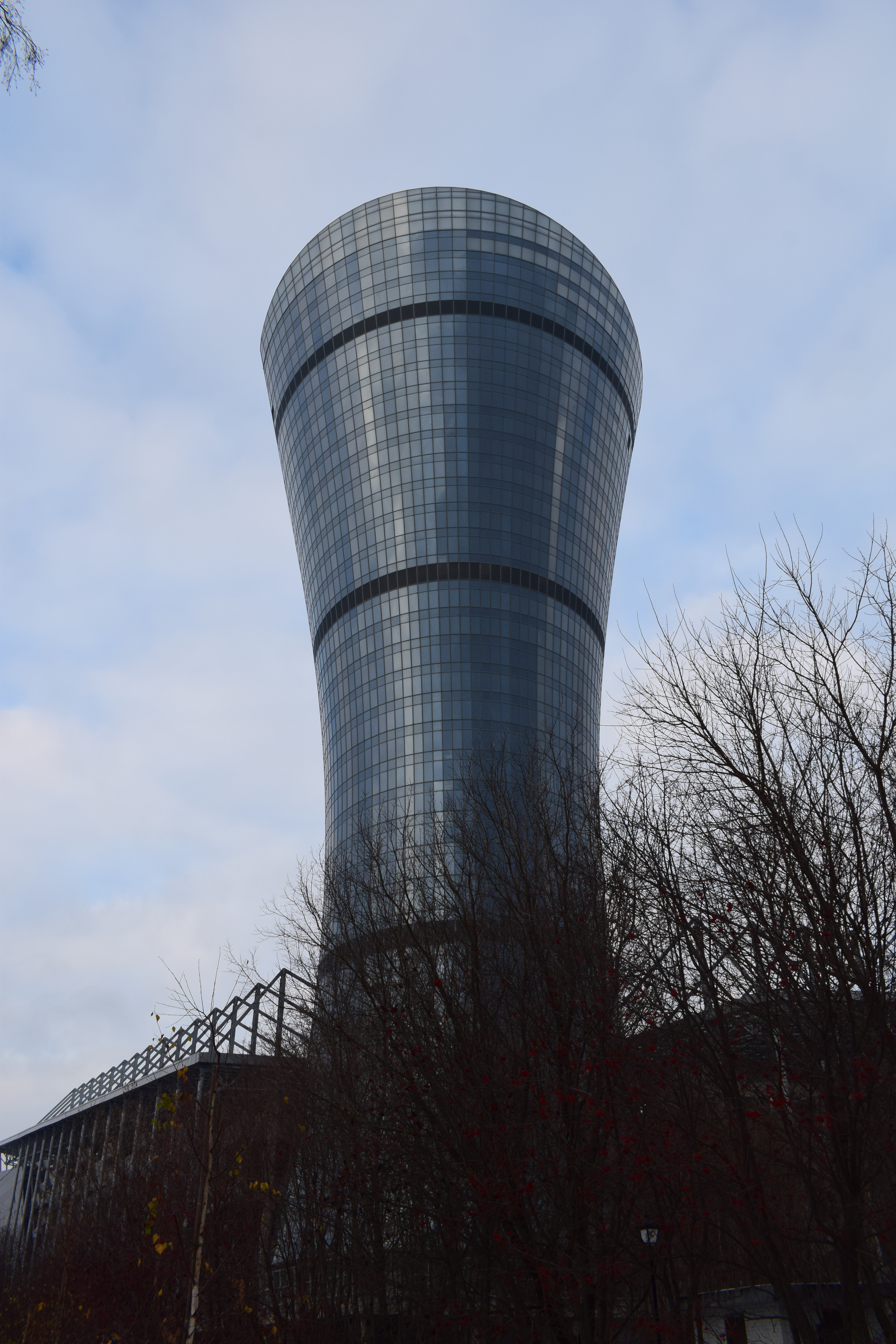
- Russian Post headquarters, the Tower of VEB Arena Stadium in Moscow
- Native name: Акционе́рное о́бщество «По́чта Росси́и»
- Romanized name: Aktsionernoye obshchestvo "Pochta Rossii"
- Company type: Federal state unitary enterprise, joint-stock company
- Industry: Postal services, courier
- Founded: 2002; 24 years ago (current form)
- Headquarters: Varshavskoye shosse 37, Moscow, Russia
- Area served: Russia (undisputed territory only)
- Key people: Mikhail Volkov (CEO)
- Services: Letter post, parcel service, EMS, delivery, freight forwarding, third-party logistics, deposit accounts
- Revenue: $2.46 billion (2016)
- Operating income: $139 million (2016; 2021)
- Net income: $25.9 million (2016)
- Owner: Government of Russia (100%)
- Number of employees: 390,000
- Parent: Ministry of Communications and Mass Media
- Subsidiaries: Pochta Bank (49.99%) JSC "Marka" (100%)
- Website: pochta.ru

Russian Post (Russian: Почта России, romanized: Pochta Rossii) is the national postal operator of Russia. The company is responsible for the delivery of mail in Russia, and the issuing of postage stamps. Russian Post employs about 390,000 people and has over 42,000 post offices, with its headquarters in Moscow. In 2012 the Russian Post delivered more than 2.4 billion pieces of mail and accounted for more than 54 million parcels and more than 100 million in remittances. In March 2013 a presidential decree signed by President Vladimir Putin included the Russian Post in a list of so-called strategic enterprises.

Russian Post owns 49.99% of the "Pochta Bank" (formerly Leto-Bank).

Postal services in Crimea are handled by a separate company, Post of Crimea.

== History ==
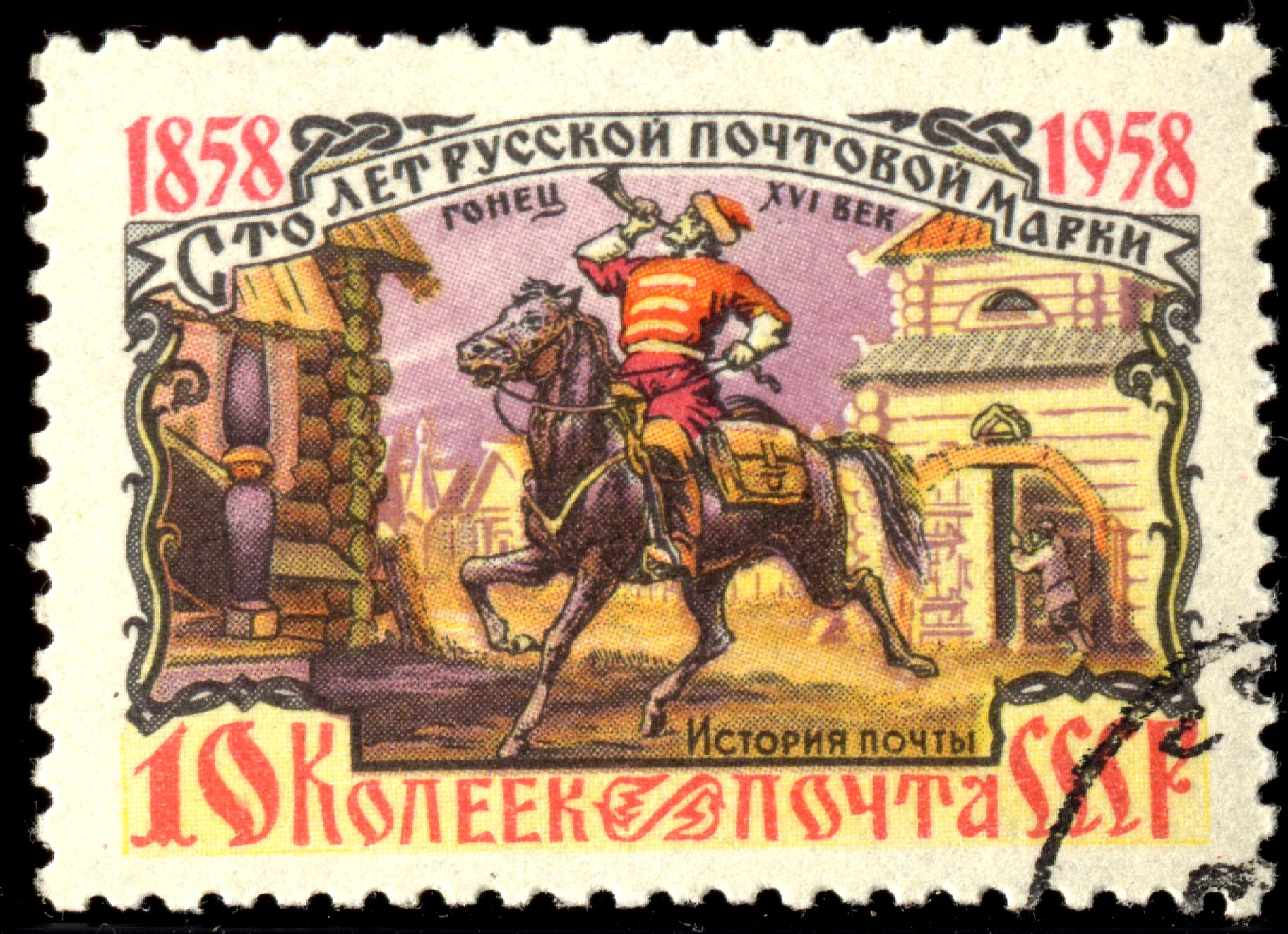
A 1958 stamp of the Soviet Union depicting a 16th-century mail courier, issued for the 100th anniversary of Russian postage stamps

=== Early history ===
Records mention a system of messengers in the 10th century. Early letters were carried in the form of a roll, with a wax or lead seal; the earliest known of these seals dates from 1079, and mentions a governor Ratibor of Tmutarakan.

By the 16th century, the postal system included 1,600 locations, and mail took three days to travel from Moscow to Novgorod. In 1634, a peace treaty between Russia and Poland established a route to Warsaw, which became Russia's first regular international service.

=== Russian Empire ===
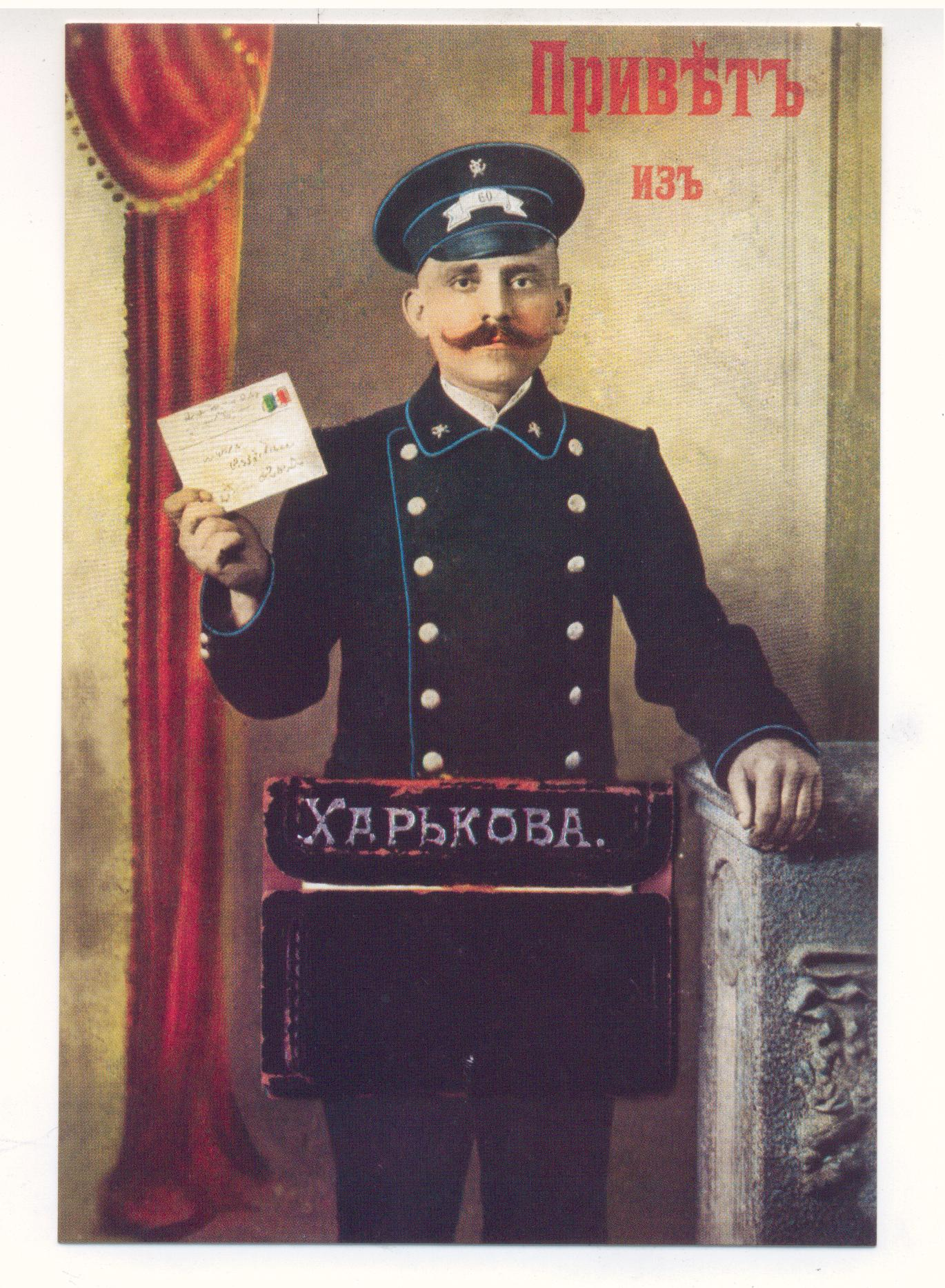
A Russian Empire postman

Peter the Great enacted reforms making the postal system more uniform in its operations, and in 1714 the first general post offices opened in Saint Petersburg and Moscow. “Regular post service” was established along the Moscow and Riga routes. In February 1714, the postal service started biweekly runs from St. Petersburg to Riga; in June of that year it started runs from St. Petersburg to Moscow. The field post office was founded in 1716, and the so-called ordinary post service in 1720, for fast conveyance of state ordinances and papers. Regular delivery of private parcels (the so-called heavy post) was organized in the 1730s and ’40s. In 1746, parcels and private correspondence were first delivered by courier, and starting in 1781 money, too, could be delivered to one's door. The earliest known Russian postmark dates from July 1765; it is a single line reading "ST. PETERSBOVRG" (in Latin letters), but the first official recommendation to use postmarks did not come until 1781.

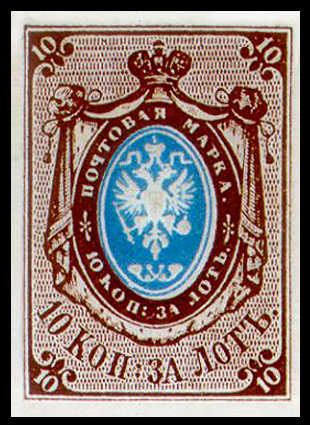
First Russian stamp, 1857

Post coaches appeared in 1820. In 1833, the St. Petersburg City Post was created, and the city was divided into 17 districts with 42 correspondence offices located in trade stores. In 1834, reception offices appeared in the suburbs (in St. Petersburg there were as many as 108). Delivery of printed periodicals was organized in St. Petersburg in 1838. The Department of Coaches and T-carts was opened in 1840 at the Moika Embankment; light cabriolets carried surplus-post, coaches delivered light post, and T-carts dealt with “heavy" post. Green street mail boxes were installed in 1848, the same year stamped envelopes were issued; orange mailboxes for same day service appeared near railway stations in 1851, with the first prepaid postage stamps appearing in 1857.

The Imperial Russian Historical Society estimated that in 1854 the Russian postal system was formed by a network of 16,510 mail couriers and of 3,950 relay stations, positioned every around 85,000 versts (roughly 90,500 kilometres). This structure was capable of delivering packages and letters twice a week in most of the Russian cities, 6 days in 63 cities and two times a year in the Kamchatka.

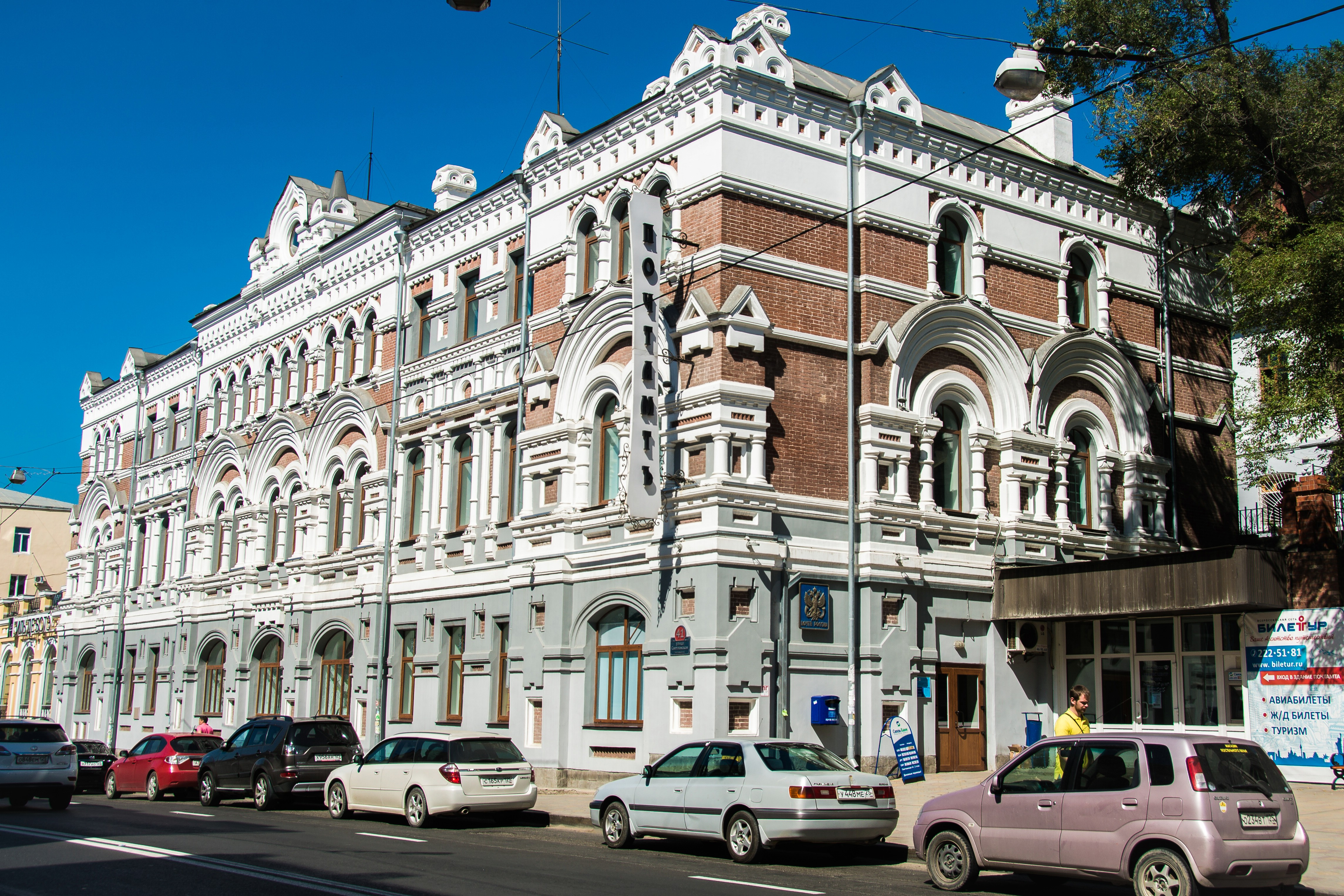
Post and telegraph office in Vladivostok, built in 1897-1899

Local postal systems used stamps referred to as Zemstvo stamps, from the term for local government begun under Alexander II in 1864.

Russian Post is a founding member of the Universal Postal Union created in 1874. In 1902 Chief Postal Service was made part of the Internal Affairs Ministry and in 1917 under the Provisional Government it became part of Ministry of Posts and Telegraphs.

=== Soviet Union ===
During World War II, known in Russia as the Great Patriotic War, Soviet postal service was a part of the People's Commissariat for Communications of the USSR. It delivered up to 70 million parcels per month to the Soviet Army front from the rear under extremely difficult and often very dangerous conditions. In the postwar years, mail service has undergone quantitative and qualitative changes. In 1946, the People's Commissariat for Communications was transformed into the USSR Ministry of Communications. Postal service has been carried out by the Post Office, which was part of the Ministry of Communications, along with other offices of telecommunications industries. By 1950, the postal industry, destroyed by the war, was restored to the pre-war level.

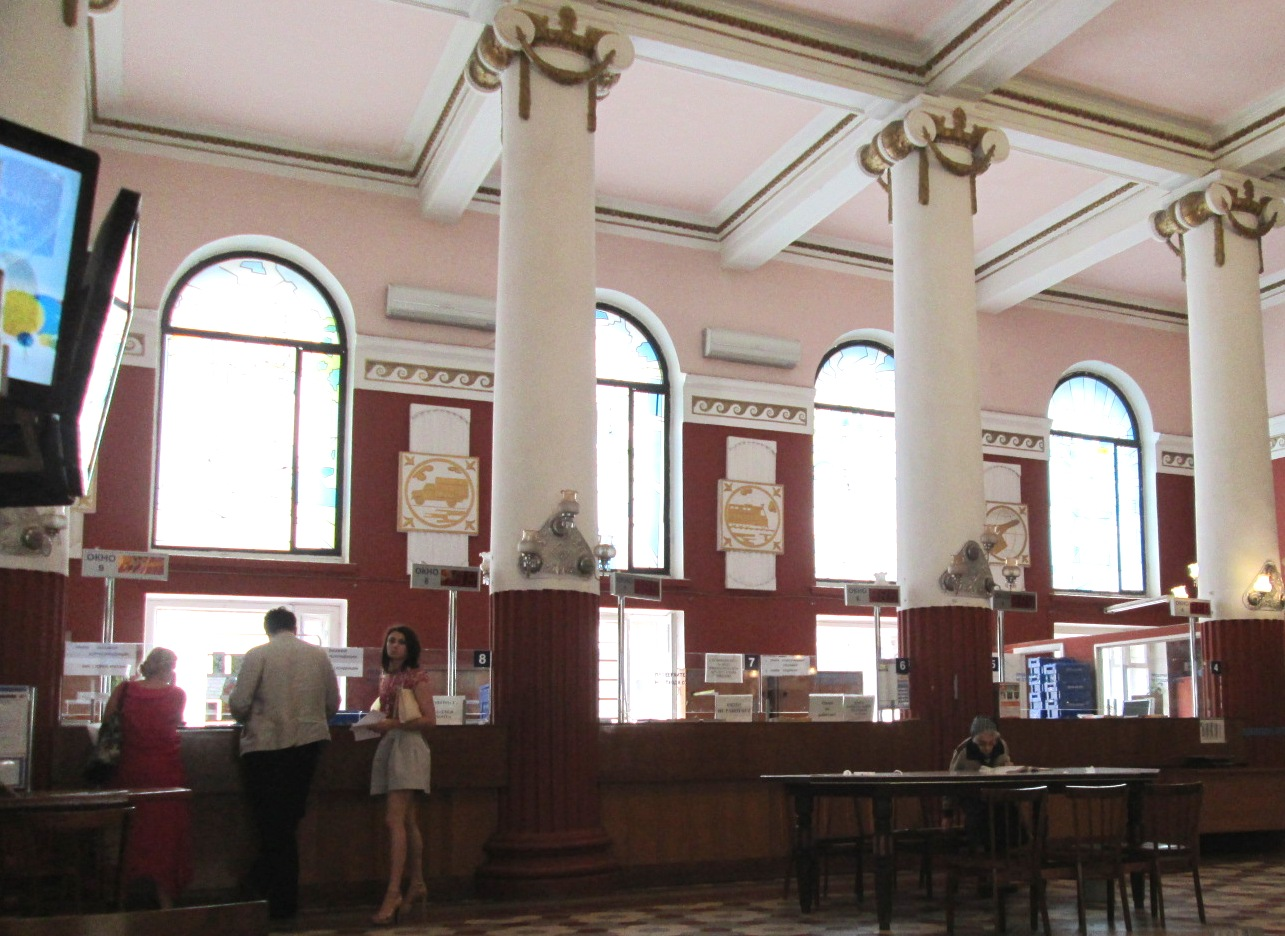
Post office in Voronezh

=== Russian Federation ===
During the Soviet era, postal and telecommunications enterprises were unified, initially existing within regional and republican communications departments, and later within state-owned communications and information technology enterprises; the USSR Ministry of Communications was at the top of the communications hierarchy. Following the collapse of the USSR, a decision was made to separate postal services into an independent industry: on November 16, 1992, the Federal Postal Administration (Russian: Федеральное управление почтовой связи) was established under the Ministry of Communications of the Russian Federation. which was supplemented with a governmental resolution no. 798 issued on August 14, 1993. By order of the Ministry of Communications, effective January 1, 1993, territorial (regional, territorial, and republican) federal postal administrations and postal institutions in Moscow and St. Petersburg were established within the Federal Postal Administration. This order also approved the list of activities for separating postal and telecommunications structures and the principles for separating postal and telecommunications.

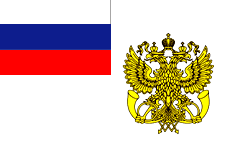
Flag of the Federal Postal Service of the Russian Federation

In 1994, a professional holiday for postal workers was established – Russian Post Day. Furthermore, in 1997, in order to restore the heraldic traditions of the Russian postal service and enhance its authority, a flag and emblem were established for the federal postal service organizations of the Russian Federation.

On October 17, 1995, the Federal Postal Administration was reorganized into the Federal Postal Service (Russian: Федеральная почтовая служба). On August 14, 1996, the Federal Postal Service was abolished, and its functions were transferred to the Ministry of Communications of Russia.

In 1996, for the first time in the centuries-long history of the Russian postal service, the Ministry of Communications of Russia decided to break the state postal monopoly on certain postal services, resulting in the emergence of commercial postal companies in Russia. The services of these new companies included courier delivery of mail, pensions and benefits, parcel forwarding, and distribution of periodicals. Another presidential decree in 1997 restored the heraldic traditions of the Russian postal service—the emblem and flag.

In 1998, the country's postal network included 149 post offices, 28 mail delivery offices at railway stations and airports, and 43,000 post offices. The state postal service's gross revenue in 1997 amounted to 9 billion rubles.

==== 2002 reform ====
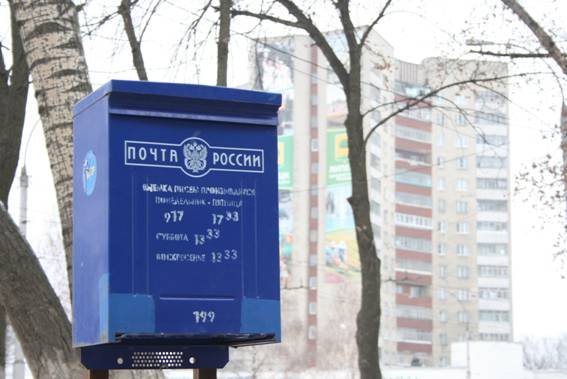
A mailbox in Lipetsk

Since the Soviet Union dissolved, the Federal Postal Service consisted of a network of 90 disparate entities which were mainly listed as state institutions or federal state unitary enterprises. In legal terms, they were completely independent concerns. They were linked to the Federal Postal Network only by a trunk intrazonal and inter-district transmission and delivery system. Different parts of the same system, connected by a single mechanism in adjacent regions, were in outright competition with each other, trying to lure corporate clients away from other competitors even if it involved an operating loss. There were no uniform budgeting, planning or other processes. These companies operated using outdated postal facilities representing as many as 50 different IT solutions in terms of industry technology.

On June 28, 2002, the Government of the Russian Federation approved the Concept for the Restructuring of Federal Postal Service Organizations. The Concept proposed merging all existing federal postal service organizations and creating a federal state unitary enterprise called Russian Post, based on economic management rights, with subsequent corporatization while maintaining state control.

The Russian Post was established by a decree of the Government of Russia on September 5, 2002. Its charter was approved on February 11, 2003. State registration of the enterprise was completed on February 13, 2003.

The formation of the enterprise and the restructuring of the postal network occurred in several stages. In 2004, the existing unitary enterprises of the postal industry were merged with Russian Post: the International Post Office, the St. Petersburg Center for Automated Information Technology Systems of Postal Communications, the Federal Postal Service Administration of Moscow (Moscow Post Office), the Center for Automated Operational and Technical Management of Communications, and the Federal Postal Service Administration of St. Petersburg and the Leningrad Oblast. In 2005, 81 federal government institutions were liquidated: the federal postal service administrations of the republics, regions, and districts, as well as the Main Center for Trunk Mail Transportation; their property was assigned to Russian Post.

==== Post-reform period ====
In 2004 Elsag Datamat won the tender to build Russian Post's first automated sorting centre. In 2008, Andrey Kazmin, former CEO of Sberbank was appointed to the CEO of the company.

In January 2009 it was announced that Kazmin was to leave his position as CEO of the Russian Post due to a financial crisis from ambitious but poorly implemented reforms. From 2009 until his ousting in the 2013 reforms the General Director was Aleksandr Kiselyov. The current CEO of Russian Post is Mikhail Volkov.

==== Growing inefficiency in the 2010s ====
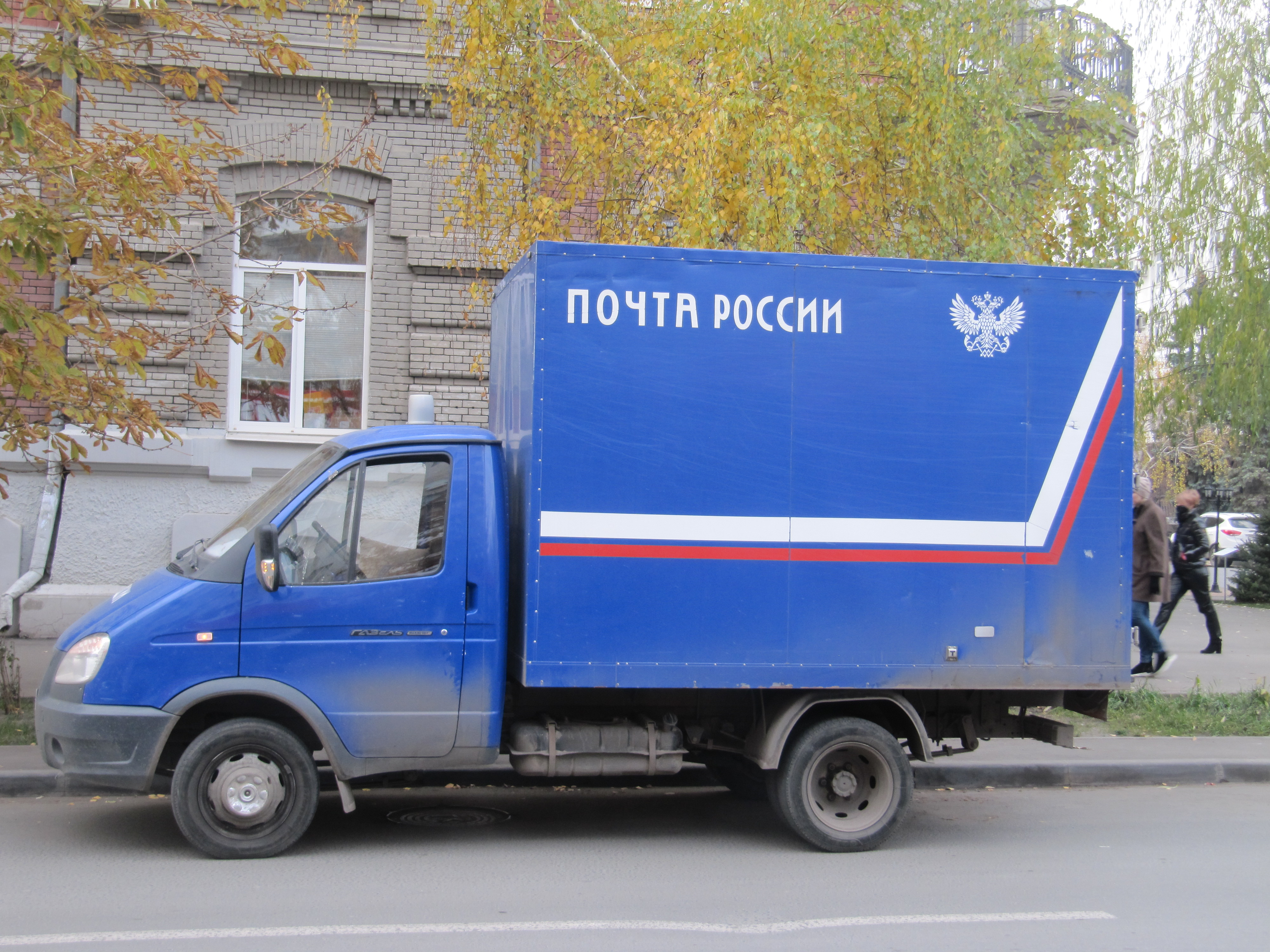
Russian Post delivery truck (GAZelle)

The early 2010s saw a rise in complaints. The number of parcels from foreign online retailers had been rising steadily for several years and was certain to rise further. According to Russian Post's own estimates, orders from Internet retailers are delivered to Russia mostly in ordinary or registered parcels; in 2009 there were 2.3 million, by 2012 the number had soared to 17 million. On March 6, 2012, five trucks from Germany were in queue to be unloaded at Vnukovo International Airport. At the International Post Office, 12,300 parcels, 5,300 EMS packages, and 36,000 minor incoming parcels had piled up. Another 2,000 parcels were waiting for customs clearance at Sheremetyevo International Airport.

In 2012 a group of people dissatisfied with the state of affairs established the website "anti-Russianpost.ru"; its goal was to allow users to highlight instances of disappointing or unsatisfactory service from Russian Post. In the middle of March the clients of on-line retailers launched a massive spam attack on the Moscow office of the Roskomnadzor watchdog. In this period the company received up to 1,000 messages from individuals with complaints about delayed deliveries of purchases made at Internet shops.

==== 2013 collapse and reform ====
In March 2013 Russian Post reported the unfavourable state of affairs. In a special message Russian Post's deputy general director, Nina Fetisova, told the Federal Communications Agency Rossvyaz and the Federal Customs Service that the processing of international mail was in a critical situation at the customs posts Vnukovo and Sheremetyevo International Airport and also at the Central International Post Office in Moscow. The director of the federal postal services of the Vologda Oblast said: "The reason for delays is not our own ineffectiveness, but the pressure of social factors. We have too many official functions: the delivery of pensions, of written correspondence, and subscriptions to newspapers and magazines".

In order to improve the services, Prime Minister Dmitry Medvedev signed a government decree to take the Russian Post out of the sphere of competence of the Federal Communications Agency Rossvyaz, and subordinate it directly to the Ministry of Communications and Mass Media. Also, On April of that year, the General Director of the Post, Alexander Kiselyov was ousted from the office.

The company's new management, in October 2013, declared an ambitious goal of doubling revenues to make the company ready for an initial public offering in 2018 by allowing it to provide banking services, reducing the number of unprofitable branches and focusing on providing deliveries from on-line retailers.

In order to handle the growth of parcels, production capacity has been expanded at regional exchange centres, with the company opening new international mail processing centres in Moscow at the Kazan station and in Yekaterinburg and Novosibirsk. In addition, Russian Post agreed with foreign postal operators on pre-sorting international mail delivery by region while the mail is still in the sender's country (pre-sorting began in China, the largest source of Russian imports), which allows a reduction in the delivery time of international mail. For example, after opening an exchange centre in Yekaterinburg, a parcel from China to Sverdlovsk can be delivered in five days, including all customs clearance.

In August 2013 Russian Post had launched its first regional flight in the far eastern Russian republic of Yakutia. The company held a ceremony at Yakutsk Airport to launch its second new airmail plane under a programme to expand links to remote areas, its first being a flight in the Khabarovsk Krai territory on Russia's east coast. Russian Post deputy director general Alexei Skatin said: "The mail must be delivered on time despite the difficult geography of the region. We are starting to improve the postal logistics in the remote regions of Russia".

==== 2014–2023 development program ====
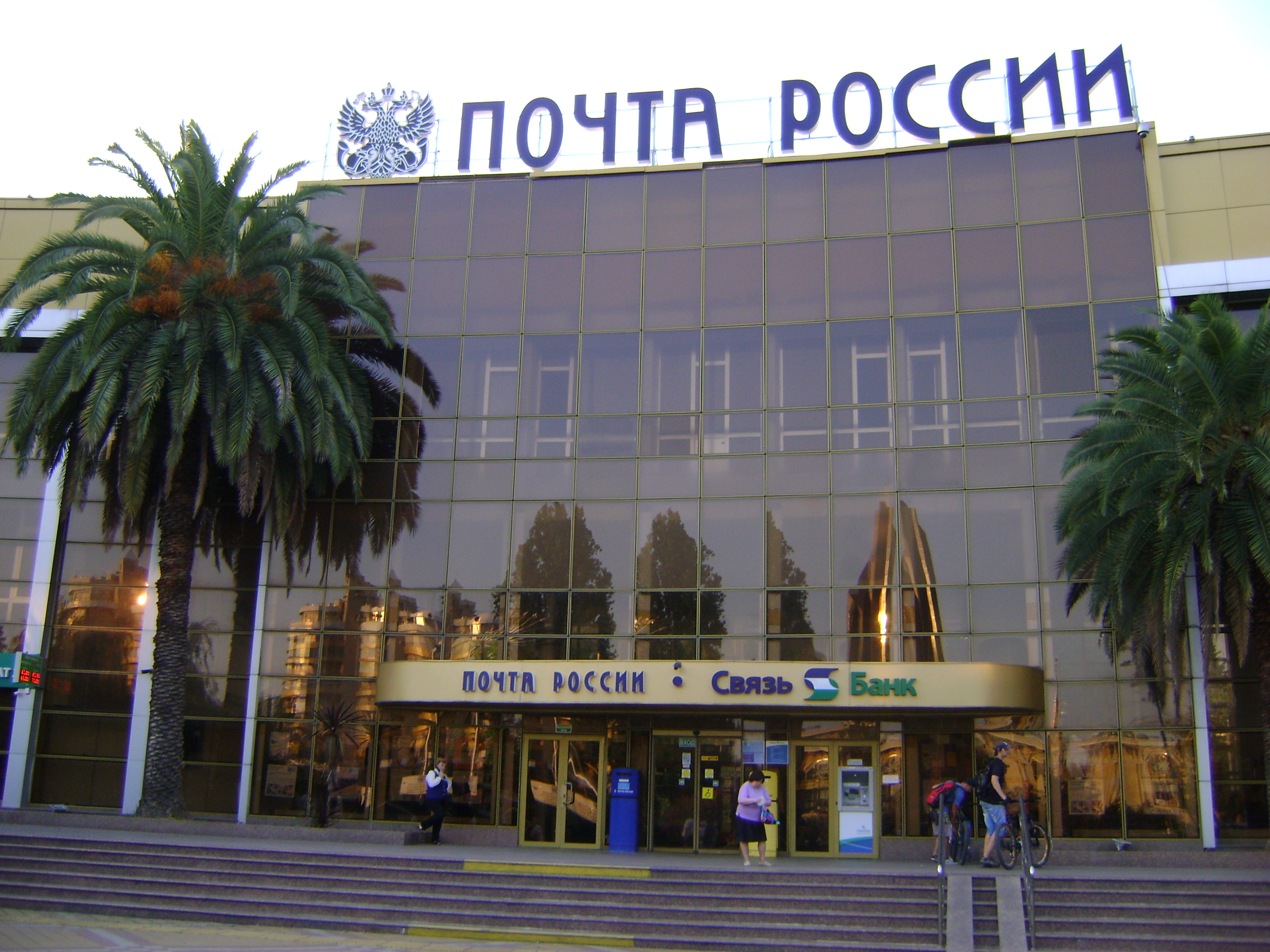
Post office in Sochi

In late October 2013 Prime Minister Medvedev generally approved the Post's development program in a meeting with Minister of Communications Nikolai Nikiforov. Among its goals are to turn the Russian Post from a model of "subsidized postal operator" to "self-sustaining postal business", modernization of its logistics infrastructure and making its work more efficient. Companies will create eight main hubs with automated sorting and direct exchange with each other. The service area of each hub will be about a 700-km radius. The number of branches in the cities will grow, while the placement of new areas will be determined by regulation. In rural areas, there will be new formats of work: "letter carrier plus internal transport," according to the reform. This is expected to reduce the number of unprofitable offices from 14 thousand to about 8.5 thousand, most of which are in rural areas. Also discussed in the draft is non-discriminatory access to the infrastructure of the postal service. In December 2013, the government published its draft Federal Law on Postal Communications, which is expected to be approved in Spring of 2014. In that year Russian Post was to begin deploying a unified ERP system — a set of integrated applications that allows creation of a single environment to automate planning, accounting, control and analysis of all core business operations across the enterprise. In September 2013 Deputy Minister of Communications Mikhail Evrayev said that one of the major problems of the Russian Post was the lack of a unified information system working both at the central office and at all branches. Russian Post at the end of 2015 presented a new digital subscription service. Russian Post acted as a subscription agency for direct cooperation with publishers.

Since 2015, Russian Post has ceased receiving state subsidies for the provision of socially significant services such as universal communication services and the distribution of periodicals. Subsidies allocated to cover a portion of the costs associated with the operation of post offices located in the Far North, related to the provision of regulated postal services, have ceased.

On March 6, 2016, the Russian Post launched a new website. In September 2021, Vladimir Putin charged to increase capitalization of Russian Post from state budget for modernization of branches in rural and hard-to-reach areas by 2025. Russian Post expects IPO in 2023 in a way to avoid probability of liabilities default as well as call for 500 billion roubles of pump priming in two years, accordingly to Russian Post strategy by 2030.

Since 2022, the Russian Post in 75 cities has been providing sellers of marketplaces with a service for the delivery of goods to warehouses of trading platforms. In May 2022, the Russian Post and JSC "Russian Railways" launched the first mail container train "Russia" on the route Moscow — Vladivostok. The service is focused on the transportation of postal items, as well as commercial bulk cargo. In June 2022, the company launched delivery from 60 minutes from retail and online stores. It plans to provide retailers with its couriers and IT infrastructure, and the stores themselves will be engaged in sales.

Since September 1, 2022, Stoloto lottery tickets have ceased to be sold through the Russian Post (40 thousand branches). Despite a 36% reduction, the number of Stoloto distribution points was about 70 thousand.

== Structure ==
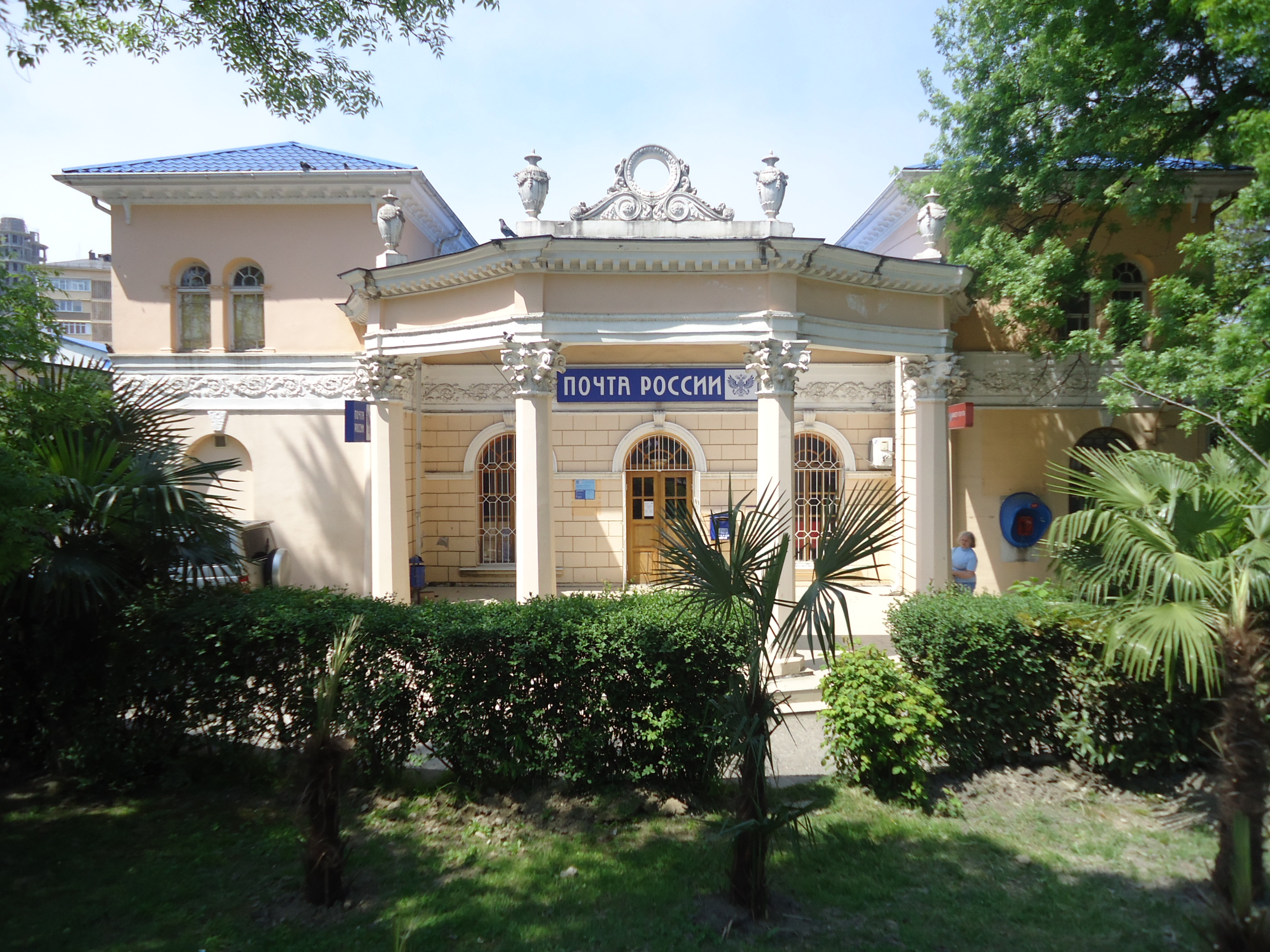
A post office in Sochi

Russian Post includes:

- central administrative apparatus, consisting of 22 units (Directorate departments, the Secretariat);
- 87 branches;
- 41,901 post offices.

Enterprise branches are divided into 82 territorial control federal postal service and 5 specialized, which include:

- The main centre-haul mail - Russian Post;
- EMS Russian Post;
- Automated sorting centres - branch office of Russian Post;
- Hybrid mail centres - branch office of the Russian Post;
- Russian Post - Russian Post in Berlin.

Branches are separate structural subdivisions, including post offices, a department for transportation of mail, and mainline and regional sorting centres.

In 2021, the company's revenue amounted to 217 billion rubles.

== Operations ==
Russian Post offers all traditional mail services in its 42,000 offices. In addition it offers to cash payment cards, accept utilities payments, execute cash transfers, receive and pay off consumer loans, and to sell lottery, rail, flight and theatre tickets. It also retails various products including phone cards, envelopes and, of course, postage stamps. In October 2012 the Russian Post had launched SMS notification for domestic shipments, and since December 2013 in a pilot program, Moscow clients of the Russian Post began to receive free SMS notification of passage of parcels from abroad. According to the postal operator, a notice will inform the customer about the admission of international mail at the point of issuance and will complement the traditional paper notices. In the future, the Post plans to inform the customer via SMS about all stages of the passage of parcels including delivery in Russia, customs control and admission to point of delivery.

The Russian Post has created a network of drop-off points where it accepts large shipments of parcels with orders, including those issued on marketplaces. The company is also providing a fulfillment service to e-commerce companies based on its logistics centers.

=== Pochtomat ===
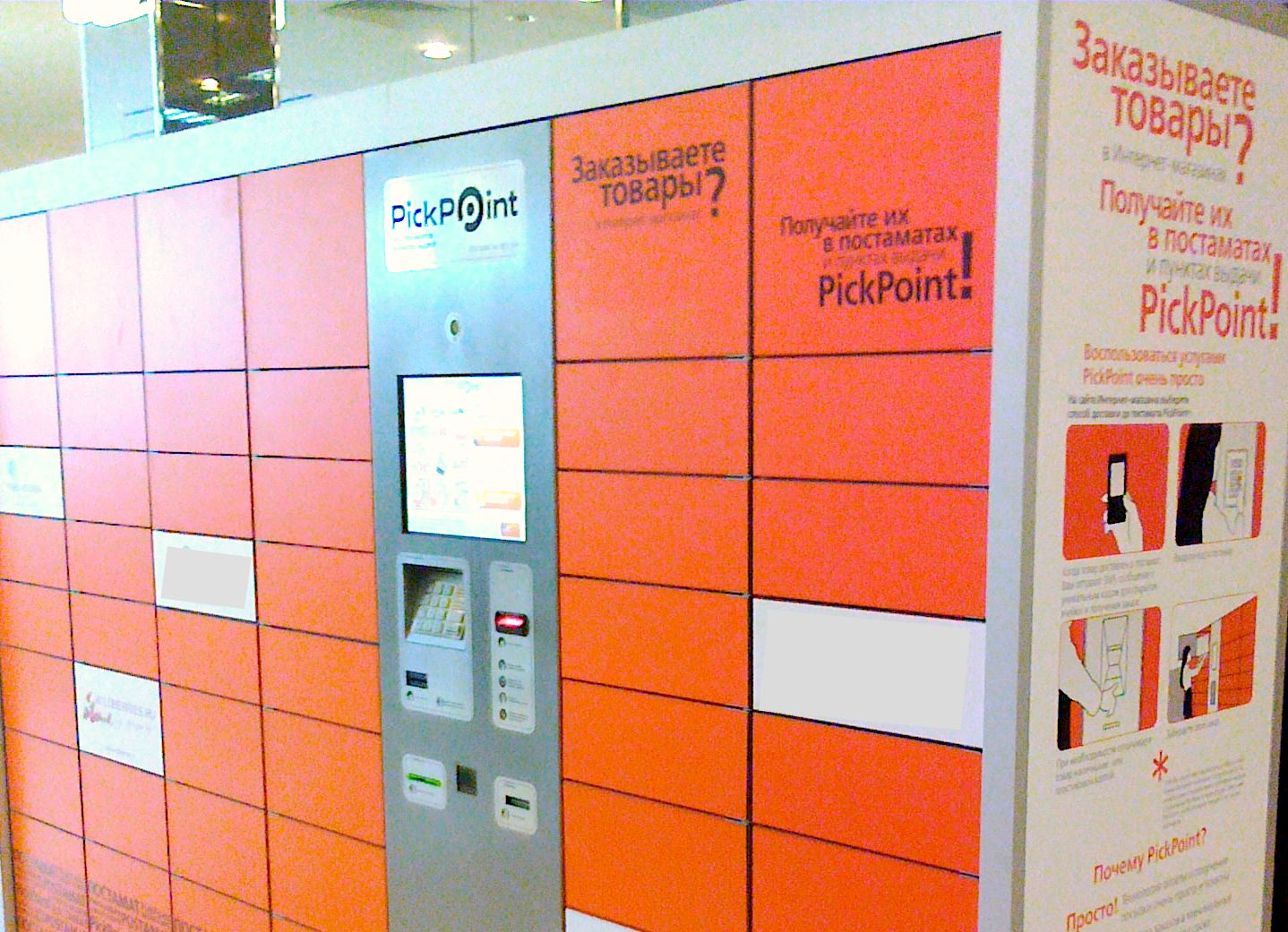
Pochtomat

In late 2010, a new delivery method with automated machines called Pochtomat (Russian: почтомат), is a parcel locker service, whose name is made up of a combination of the words "почта", "post" in Russian, and automat, came into use. In 2011, a number of those postmats were deployed in Moscow and Saint Petersburg. In April 2013 the first Pochtomat began working in Saransk and in the summer of 2013 first Pochtomat in the South Urals began in Chelyabinsk. Automatic issue of shipments is made under a special code that the recipient receives via cell phone as an SMS. By June 2013, Russian Post operated 145 Pochtomats in 60 cities.

=== Financial services ===
In August 2013 Russian Post began accepting loan payments on behalf of any Russian bank. Repayment of loan is made by postal transfer to a subsidiary of the Post, ООО "Rapid", then the money is sent by bank transfer to the appropriate bank. Postal employees themselves complete a payment form for the customer, then the postal order form is printed and signed by the customer. For the usage of postal services, operators charge a fee of 1.9 percent, with a minimum of 50 rubles.

=== Postal kiosks ===
In 2011 the Russian Post launched postal kiosks based on the results of a pilot project. This began in 2011 with seven stalls of 6 square meters each. Besides sending and receiving regular and express mail, insurance and credit cards can be issued, loan payments can be made, payments for cellular communication, Internet and utilities and the purchase of railway and flight tickets. In September 2013 the Russian Post management decided to radically revise its approach to retail, and in particular refused to sell food in the offices. It was decided to expand the idea of postal kiosks, and even entered the draft of a new strategy of development of the Russian Post until 2023, which was prepared by Boston Consulting Group. In 2014 the Russian Post plans to open 10-15 new kiosks in Moscow and another 150 in other regions.

=== Mobile post ===
Beginning in the 2010s Russian Post began using Mobile Post Van, also called "Post on Wheels" (Russian: Почта на колесах) which drive with driver and post seller into remote villages where the Post office was closed due to being ineffective (small rural communities), and provides all the post services that were once were in the post office.

=== Regional sorting center ===
Russia's first automated regional sorting center opened in Podolsk, near Moscow in late 2009, using equipment of Italian company Elsag Datamat, SpA. In June 2011 another center was opened, in Saint Petersburg, which serves the Leningrad, Novgorod and Pskov Oblasts.

=== UAV delivery ===
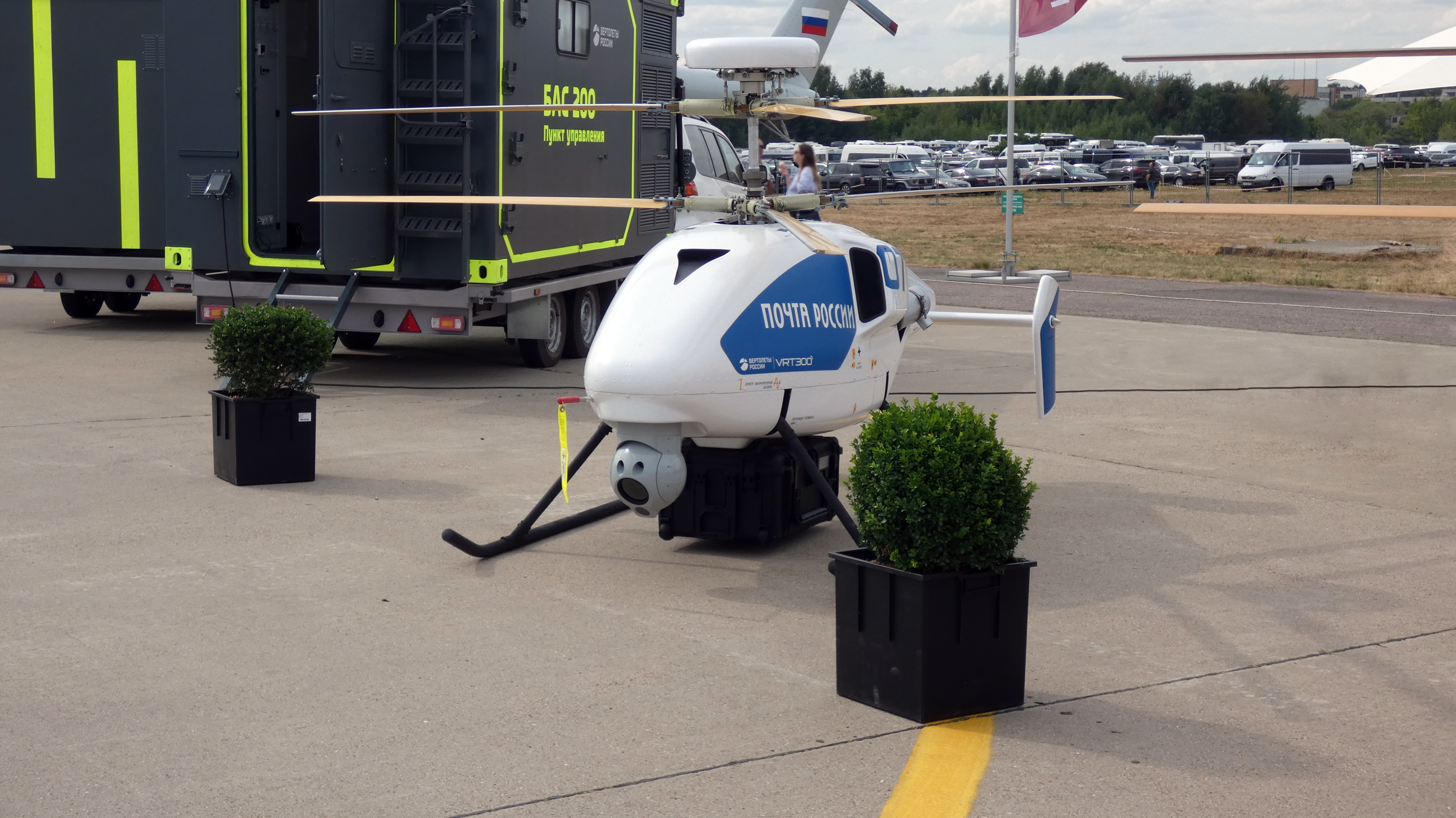
VRT 300 post edition drone

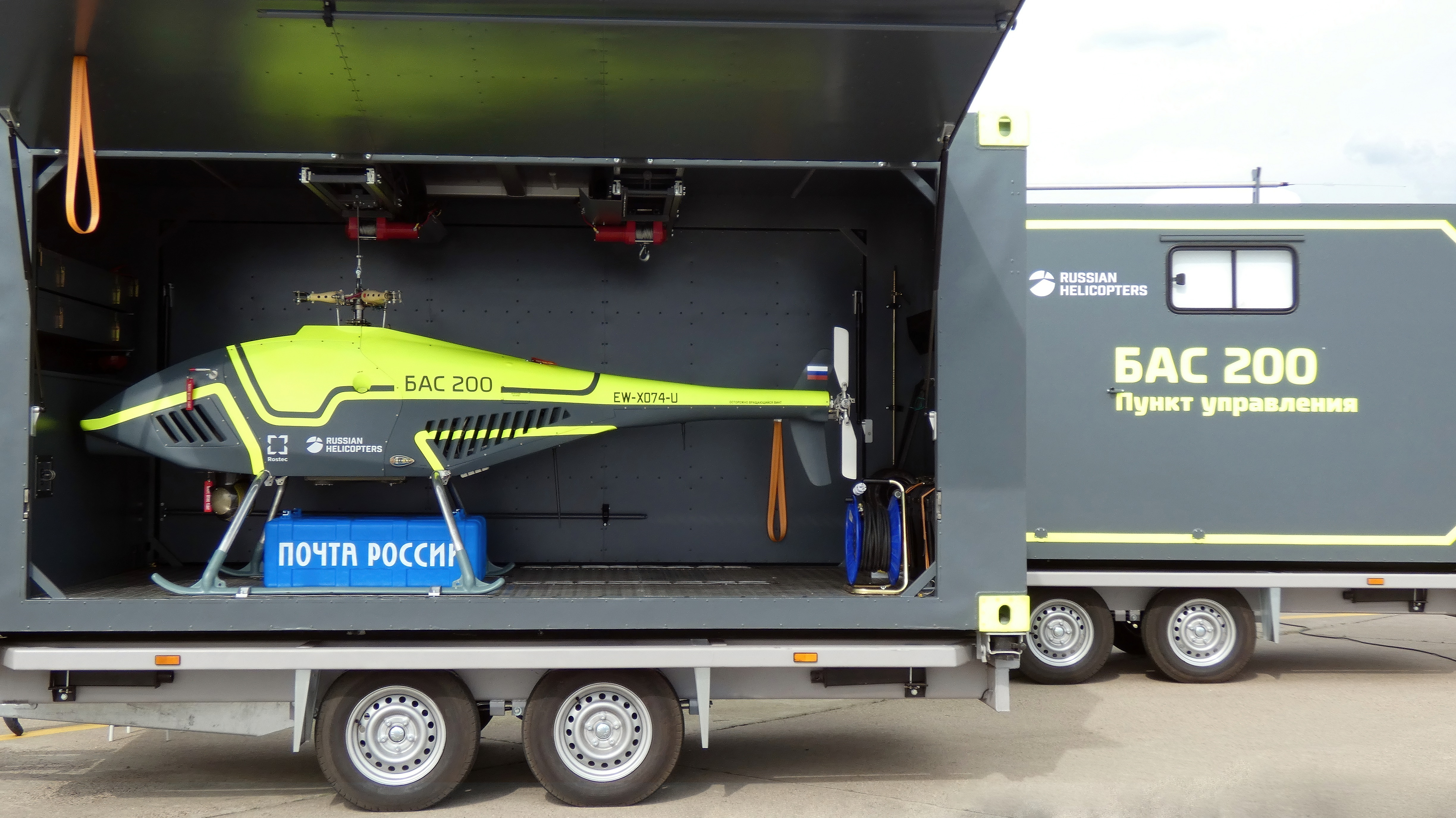
BAS 200 post edition drone

In 2021, Russian Post successfully tested UAV delivery and the commercial launch of Russian Post drones on 9 routes in Khanty-Mansi Autonomous Okrug region by the end of 2022.

=== International exchange points ===
Russian Post operates 13 points of customs clearance of postal items. Until 2013, the Moscow MMPO processed up to 80% of all incoming international shipments to Russia which created much stress on the Russian Post. In order to speed up the time for delivery of international parcels, the Russian Post opened two new international postal exchange points in Yekaterinburg and Novosibirsk. The latter one can process up to two thousand international EMS-daily departures, with an area more than 2,000 square meters. The Yekaterinburg Koltsovo international postal exchange point is the first international postal exchange in the Urals Federal District. It can handle up to 20,000 parcels and small packets per day in the 3,700m facility. Until the end of 2014 Russian Post expects to reduce the Moscow point of exchange share to 55%. In addition there are exchange points in Bryansk, Samara, Orenburg, Petrozavodsk and Vladivostok.

== Foreign cooperation ==
In 2009, a first formal cooperation agreement came between the Russia and Italy to work together to develop the postal system in Russia. On late November 2013 Russian Post and Poste Italiane have signed a new agreement to cooperate further in order to improve the Russian postal system. The agreement, which was signed along with their technology supplier Selex, was sealed at a trade summit in Trieste during an official visit of Russian president Vladimir Putin, following up earlier agreements between the three companies. Along with development of e-commerce and international express mail services, the new agreement aims to develop hybrid mail in Russia for businesses, direct marketing and e-government services. This would allow mailers to send information electronically to be turned into physical mailpieces local to the recipient.

Russian Post is currently suspended from PostEurop, due to the Russian invasion of Ukraine.

== See also ==
- Media of Russia
- Ministry of Communications and Mass Media
- Postage stamps and postal history of Russia
- Rostelecom
- Russian post offices in China
- Russian post offices in Crete
- Russian post offices in the Turkish Empire
- Soviet and post-Soviet postage rates
- Telecommunications in Russia
- Transport in Russia
