= Postage stamps and postal history of Mongolia =

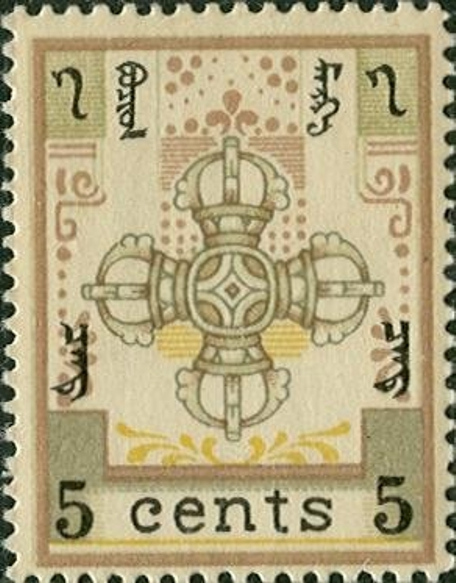
The first stamps of Mongolia, issued in 1924

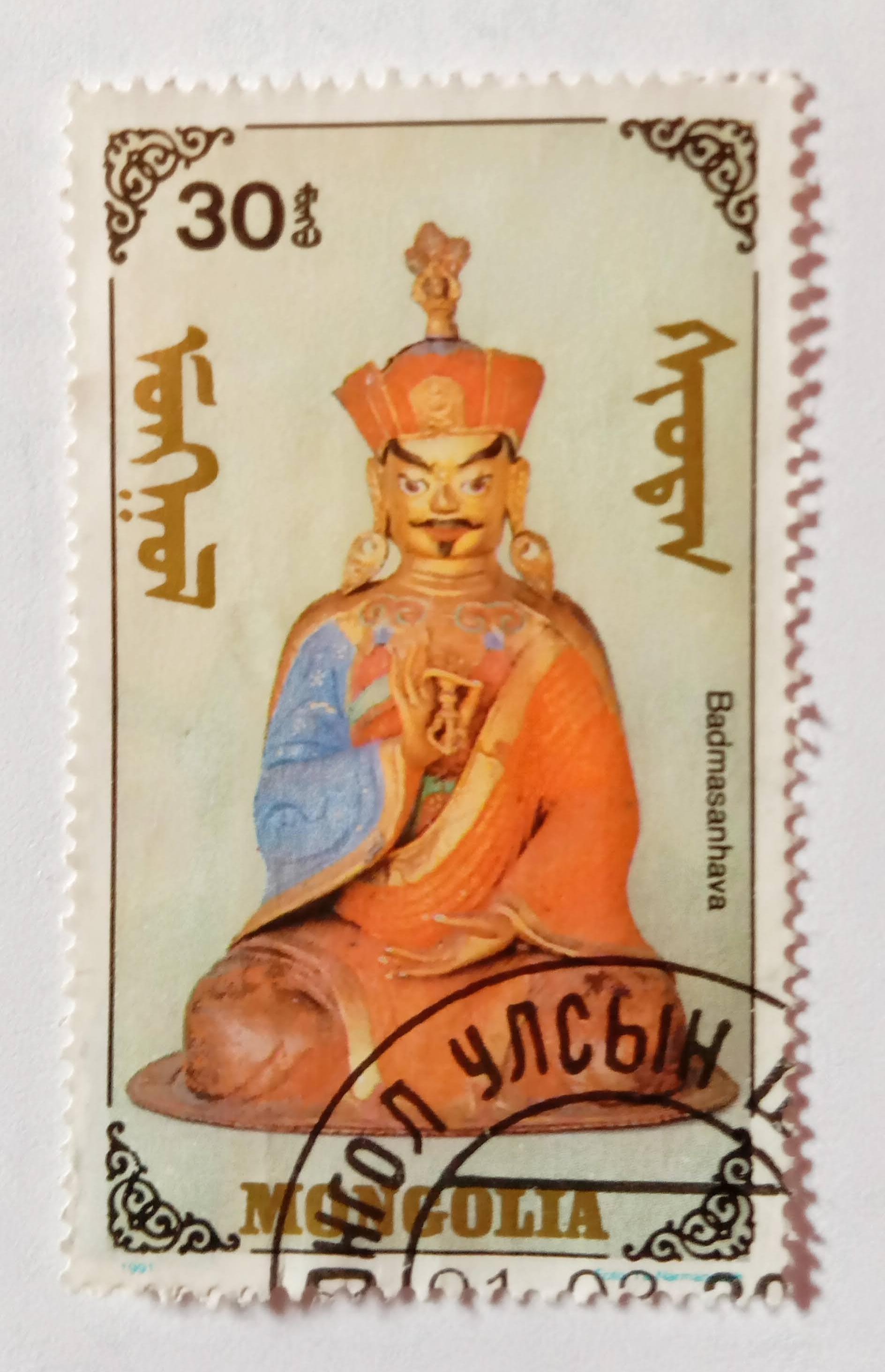
A modern postage stamp of Mongolia, featuring Padmasambhava, a founding figure in Tibetan Buddhism

This is a survey of the postage stamps and postal history of Mongolia.

Mongolia is a landlocked country in East and Central Asia. It is bordered by Russia to the north and the People's Republic of China to the south, east and west. Ulaanbaatar is the capital and largest city.

== First posts ==
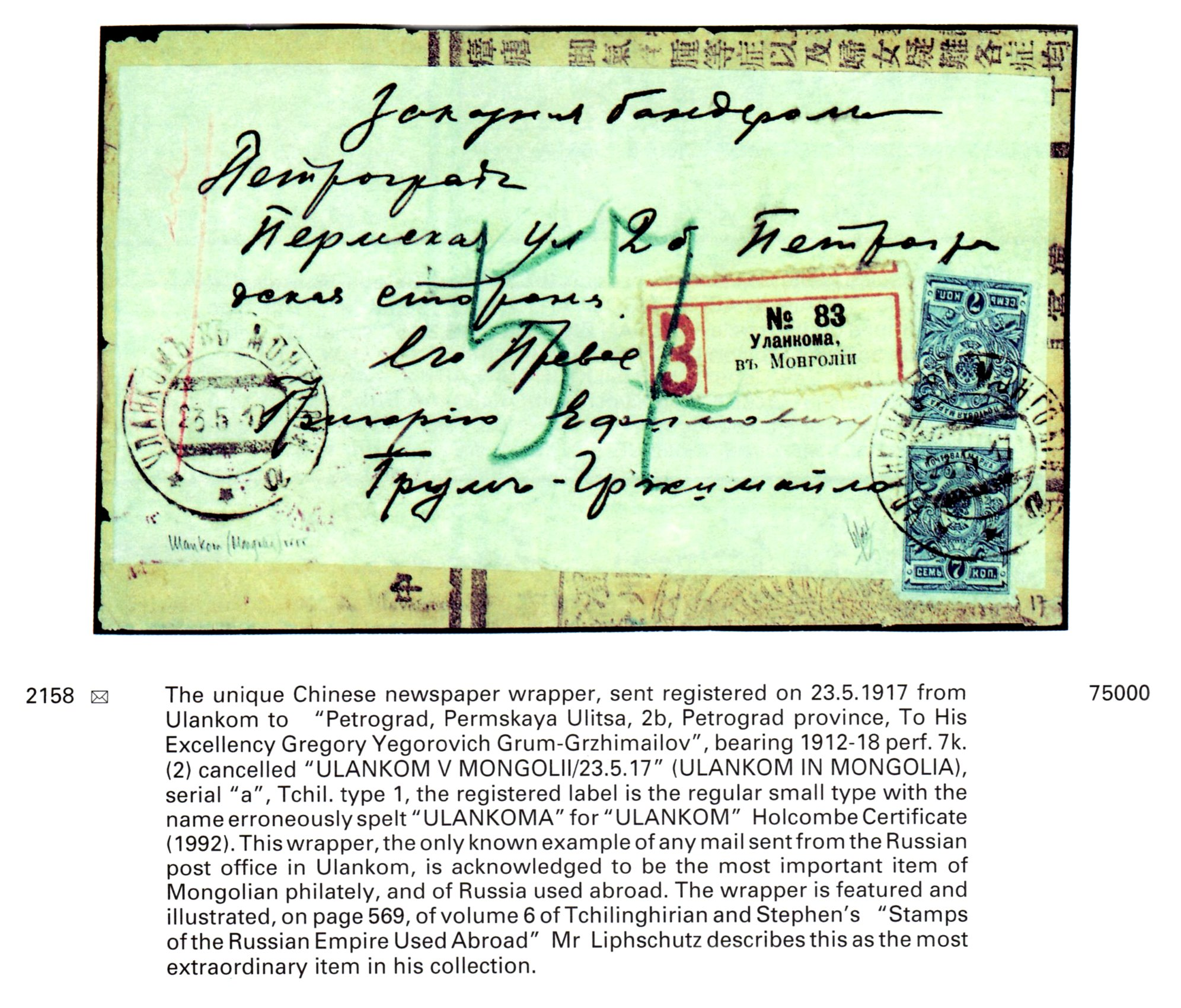
The 1917 "Ulankom" newspaper wrapper. The only known mail from the Russian post office in Ulankom, Mongolia. Formerly in the collection of Michel Liphschutz.

The first stamps used in Mongolia were those of Russia from 1858 who operated a number of post offices in the country.

== First Mongolian stamps ==
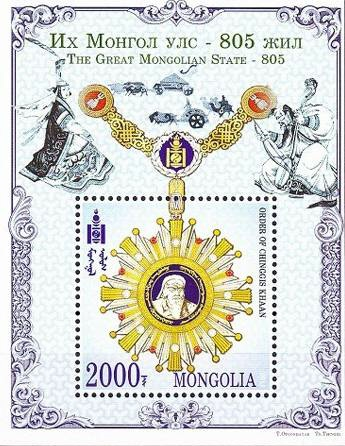
A 2011 souvenir sheet of Mongolia commemorating the 805th Anniversary of the Mongol Empire

The first stamps of Mongolia were issued in August 1924, depicting the Vajra, a scepter that is a religious symbol in Buddhism.

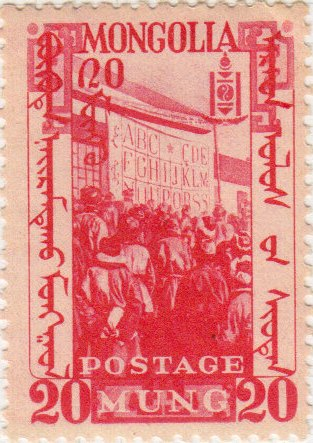
The 1932 series

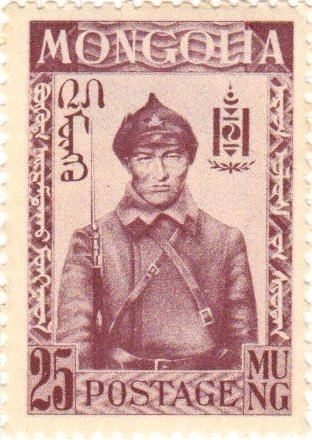
The 1932 series

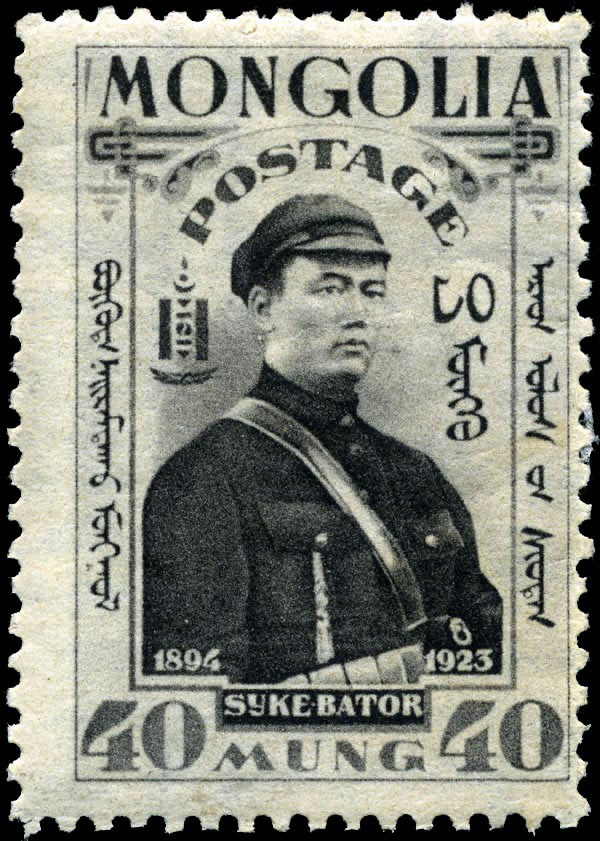
The 1932 series

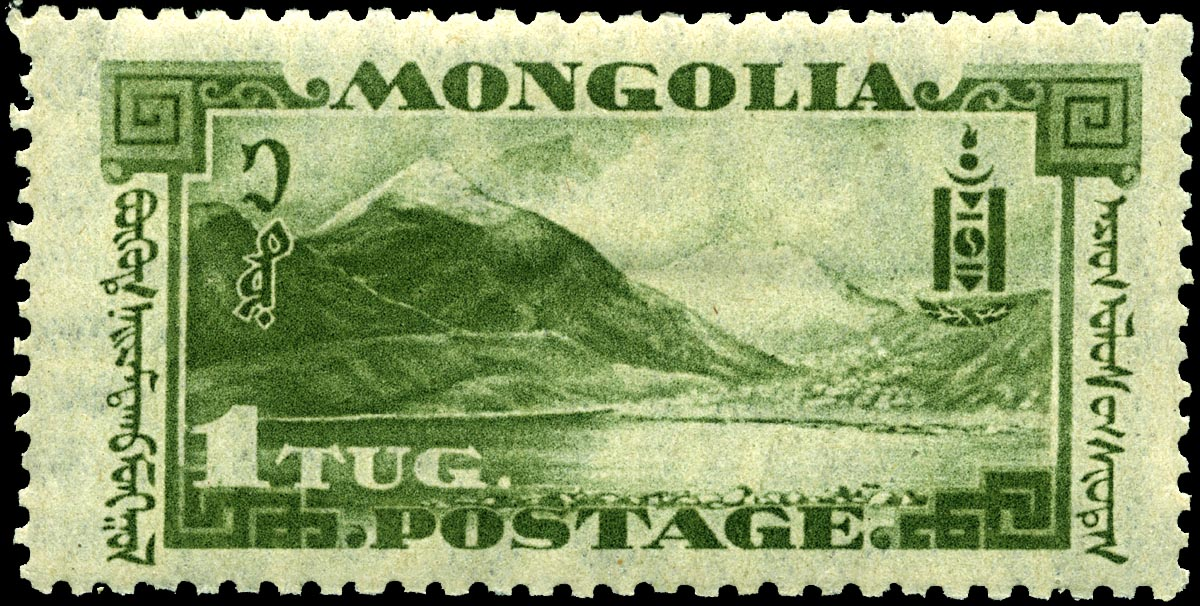
The 1932 series

== See also ==
- Postage stamps and postal history of Tannu Tuva
- Mongol Post
