= Financial Ombudsman Service of the Russian Federation =

The Financial Ombudsman Service of the Russian Federation
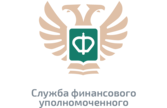

Overview
- Established: 2018
- State: Russia
- Headquarters: Moscow; Staromonetniy 3
- Website: finombudsman.ru

The Financial Ombudsman Service of the Russian Federation (FOS hereinafter) was created in 2018 to mediate consumer rights complaints and out-of-court disputes between consumers of financial services and financial organizations. It was created under federal law on June 4, 2018 (No. 123-ФЗ “On the Ombudsman for the Rights of Consumers of Financial Services”) to provide legal status of the Financial Ombudsman Service, the procedure for its activities, specific rules and regulation procedures as well as consideration of citizens’ complaints scheme and other legal relations. It was designed to help resolve disputes between consumers and financial institutions providing clients and considers claims against credit institutions, insurance organizations, microfinance institutions, credit consumer cooperatives, pawnshops and non-state pension funds on a mandatory and voluntary basis

== The Financial Ombudsman Service structure ==
The Financial Ombudsman Service of the Russian Federation: consists of

- Chief Financial Ombudsman and ombudsmen for financial services;
- the Financial Ombudsman Service Council;
- the Ombudsman for financial services consumers support Service;
- the Financial Ombudsman Service Expert Council.

== Main activities ==
The Financial Ombudsman Service of the Russian Federation performs out-of-court resolution of disputes between consumers of financial services and financial institutions that have provided them with a service:. In accordance with the applicable law and regulations, the interaction with the Financial Ombudsman is currently mandatory for

- insurance organizations that carry out activities in Compulsory Motor Liability insurance, Voluntary Third Party Liability insurance and insurance of land vehicles (except for railway) – since June 1, 2019;
- all insurance organizations (except for organizations that carry out compulsory health insurance exclusively) – since November 28, 2019;
- all microfinance institutions – since January 1, 2020;
- credit institutions, pawnshops, credit consumer cooperatives and non-state pension funds – since January 1, 2021.

== Performance results ==
In 2019, the Financial Ombudsman Service accepted 47,655 complaints for consideration.: 37,428 decisions were made, 10,227 complaints were in the process of consideration as at the end of 2019. Among the 37,428 made decisions 30,909 cases (82.6%) contain full or partial satisfaction of the applicants’ claims or on refusal to satisfy them (on the merits of the dispute) and 6,519 (17.4%) cases state the termination of consideration of the complaint. Overall, during the 2019 business year the total number of complaints received is 91,359 (around 609 applications on daily basis) with the mean value of 210,614 rubles: 70,267 complaints (77%) sent by consumers through the applicant's personal account on the Financial Ombudsman Service; and 21,092 complaints (23%) were delivered by hand or by the Russian Post
