= Russian post offices in China =

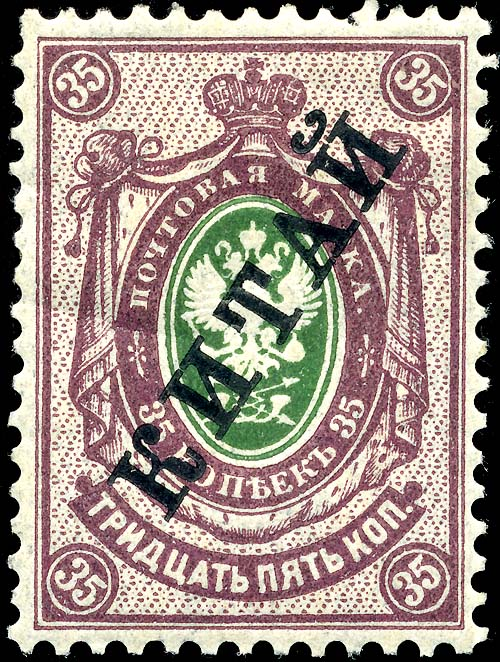
A 35 kopecks stamp of 1904

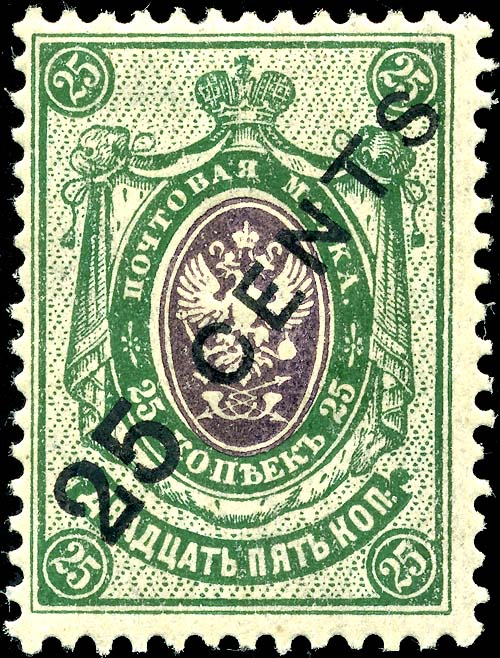
A 25 cents on 25 kopecks stamp of 1917

The Russian post offices in China were a collection of post offices established by Imperial Russia in various cities of China beginning in 1870.

== First offices ==
The first offices were in Beijing, Kalgan, Tientsin, and Urga (in Mongolia), all in areas near to Russian-controlled territory. In November 1886 additional offices opened in Shanghai, Chefoo, Hankow with offices in Port Arthur, and Dairen following soon afterwards. In addition, many Russian Field Post Offices operated throughout Manchuria and civilian mail was frequently accepted there as well. Finally, the Chinese Eastern Railway had Russian post offices operating at most of the major stations, and important cities along the railway such as Harbin had several Russian post offices in the town itself. In addition, Travelling Post Offices operated in trains along the Chinese Eastern Railway.

== Stamps ==
Initially, the offices used the regular stamps of Russia, but in 1899, they received stamps overprinted with "KITAI" (Russian for China) in Cyrillic script. This overprint was applied to all types of stamps up to 1916, including the varieties on horizontally laid, vertically laid, and wove paper. The overprint was also applied to postal stationery envelopes, postcards, letter cards and newspaper wrappers. The overprint itself was in black, blue, or red, generally being chosen to contrast with the stamp colors. Most of these types are commonly available today (less than one US$); the most problematic is the blue overprint on the 14-kopeck wove paper variety, whose existence has been questioned.

Although the offices had always accepted Chinese currency at par, a Chinese cent being considered equivalent to a kopeck, in 1917 the overprint was changed to clarify the situation, simply consisting of the value in Chinese money and using Latin letters. The valuation was still one-to-one. A later round of overprints, in 1920, changed to use a horizontal overprint in mixed case, but these saw little use, all Russian post offices in China being closed in that year.

== See also ==
- Postage stamps and postal history of Russia
- Russian post offices abroad
- Russian post offices in Crete
- Russian post offices in the Turkish Empire
