= Russian Steam Navigation and Trading Company =

Russian Steam Navigation and Trading Company's flag

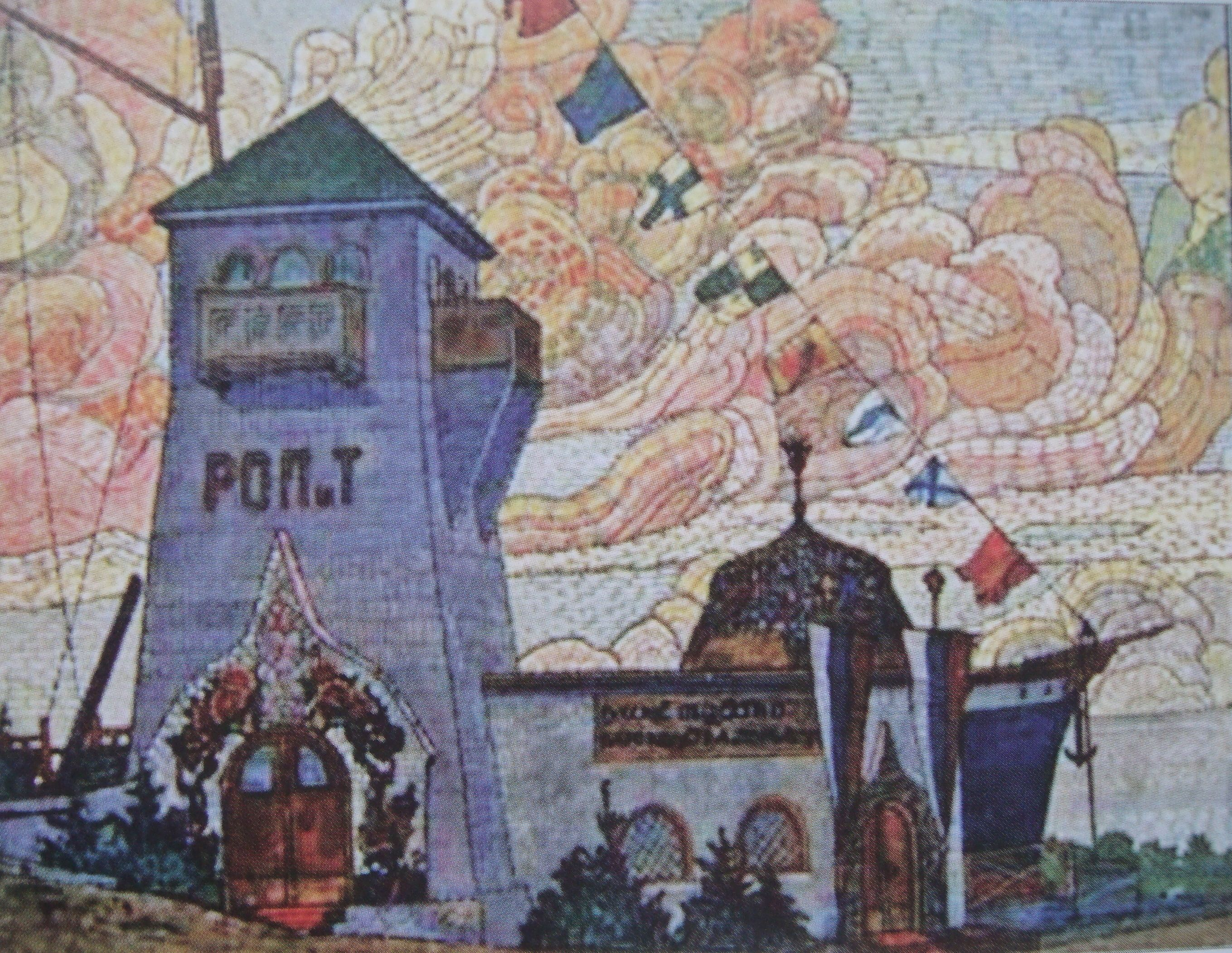
1910 postcard showing the Russian pavilion of the Russian Steam Navigation and Trading Company at the Odessa Exposition

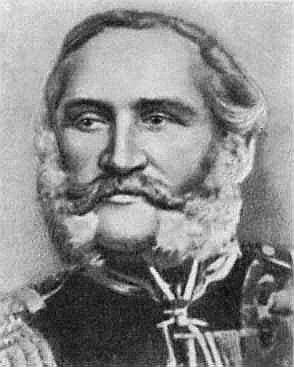
Nikolai Arkas, first director of ROPiT

The Russian Steam Navigation and Trading Company (Russian: Русское общество пароходства и торговли or ROPiT Russian: РОПиТ, also referred as Russian S.N.Co.) of Odessa was one of the biggest joint stock steamship companies in Imperial Russia.

== Structure ==
ROPiT was established in 1856 and ceased to exist in 1918 due to nationalization after the revolution in Russia. In 1858 the company obtained a 24-year contract for usage of the port of Villafranca Marittima, on the Mediterranean with the Kingdom of Sardinia. from 1863 to 1914 all Russian post offices in the Ottoman Empire were run by the ROPiT.

== Passenger lines ==
The company also offered passenger rides. For example, weekly services on the routes "Constantinople-Smyrna-Piraeus-Alexandria, Constantinople-Odessa" - every fortnight the Bulgarian ports of Burgas and Varna were also called in - and "Constantinople–Sevastopol". By 1914 the ROPiT operated a direct line from Odessa via Constantinople to Alexandria and a round trip line and a "Macedonian line" there. Also Black Sea cruises were offered. So changed weekly the "Bulgarian-Anatolian line" from Odessa to Burgas, Constantinople and Trebizond to Batum and the "Anatolian Line" from Constantinople to Batum.

== ROPiT fleet ==
In 1901 it had a fleet of 72 steamships. Company stock was listed on Saint-Petersburg Stock Exchange.

- Svet (Свет) (1815)
- Imperator Aleksander II (Император Александр II) (1858)
- Veliky Knyaz Konstantin (Великий Князь Константин) (1858)
- Oleg (Олег) (1859)
- Lazar (Лазар) (1863)
- Rostov (Ростов) (1867)
- Imperatritsa Maria (Императрица Мария) (1877)
- Askold (Аскольд) (1879, since 1886 till 1916)
- Chuanpu (Хуанпу) (1882)
- Tsar (Царь) (1883)
- Mechta (Мечта) (1884)
- Luch (Луч) (1886)
- Odessa (Одесса) (1889)
- Veliky Knyaz Aleksei (Великий Князь Алексей) (1890)
- Blesk (Блеск) (1890)
- Veliky Knyaz Konstantin (Великий Князь Константин) (II) (1890)
- Veliky Knyaz Konstantin (Великий Князь Константин) (III) (1890)
- Svyatoi Nikolai (Святой Николай) (1893)
- Korolyeva Olga (Королева Ольга) (1893)
- Imperator Nikolai II (Император Николай II)
- Chtyr Dag (Чатыр Даг) (1896)
- Diana (Диана) (1899)
- Chikhachyov (Чихачёв)
- Alton (Алтон) (1901)
- Meteor (Метеор) (1901)
- Khersones (Херсонес) (1903)
- Evfrat (Евфрат) (1906) called Euphrate in France (based in Marseille after the beginning of the October Revolution).
- Printsessa Yevgenia Oldenburgskaya (Принцесса Евгения Ольденбургская) (1903)
- Imperator Nikolai I (Император Николай I) (1913)
- Imperatritsa Yekaterina II (Императрица Екатерина II)
- Imperator Aleksander III (Император Александр III)
- Imperator Pyotr Veliky (Император Пётр Великий)
- Tsar Mikhail Fyodorovich (Царь Михаил Фёдорович) (1914)
- Tsarevich Aleksey Nikolayevich (Цесаревич Алексей Николаевич) (1914)

== Personnel ==
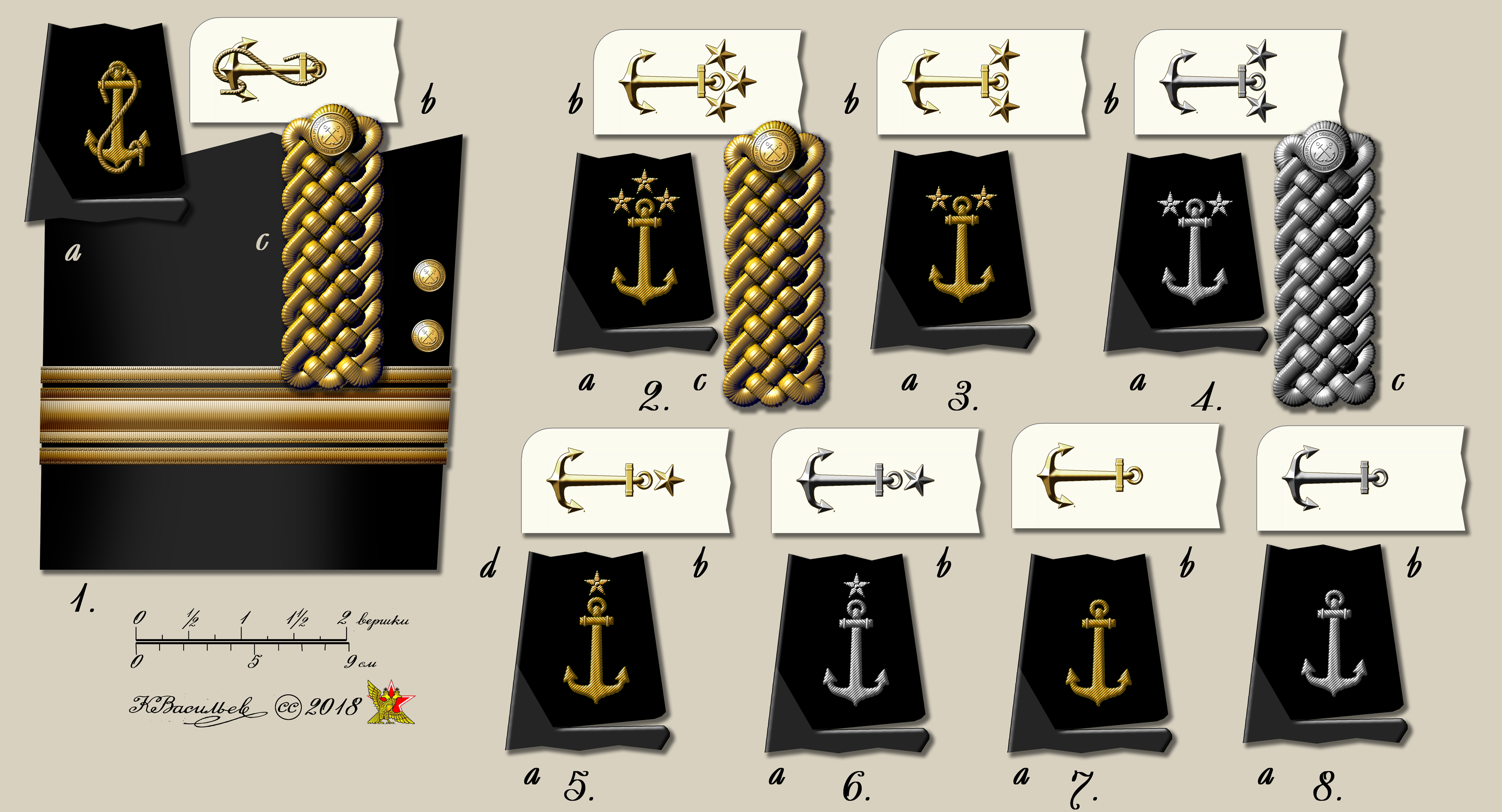
Rank insignia: a. Insignia on frock coat collars b. Insignia on summer jacket, coat and short coat collars c. Shoulder braids d. Sleeve insignia 1. Inspector of shipping 2. Captain 3. Chief mate 4. Chief engineer 5. Second mate 6. First engineer 7. Third mate 8. Second engineer

== See also ==
- Black Sea Shipping Company
