= Marka (company) =

Russian company

JSC "Marka"
- Type: Federal state unitary enterprise
- Industry: Philately
- Predecessor: DIEZPO
- Headquarters: Moscow, Russia
- Parent: Russian Post
- Website: rusmarka.ru

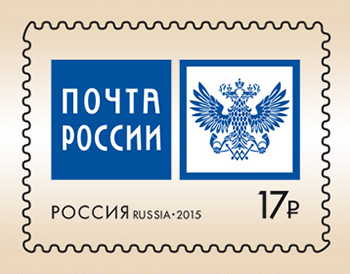
Stamp by Publishing and Trade Centre "Marka"

JSC Marka (Russian: АО «Марка») (until 2016 Federal State Unitary Enterprise "Publishing and Trading Center " Marka " (Russian: ФГУП Издательско-торговый центр «Марка»)) is a Russian company provides publishing and distribution of postage stamps - stamps, booklets, ASE, postal stationery, wire forms, FDC and special cancellation postmarks. The range of products also includes postcards and philatelic collections. The company also manufactures special postage stamp that has the original exterior design: drawing and additional memorable text. Philatelic products are distributed through post offices and philatelic specialty stores across the country.

== History ==
History of Publishing and Trade Center "Marka" begins with 1857, when at the main post office was founded Branded expedition and issued a circular Postal Department "On the introduction of postage stamps for public use", but then in December 1857, and in some provinces went on sale first grade. On January 1, 1858, began their official application for payment of simple written correspondence on the territory of Russia.

The predecessor of Marka in the Soviet period was the Directorate for the Publishing and Forwarding of Postage Stamps known by its acronym DIEZPO (Russian: ДИЭЗПО) of the Soviet Ministry of Communications, a state specialized organization that carried out the preparation, publication and forwarding of postage stamps and other postage marks in the USSR. The production of postage signs was carried out by the Expedition for the Procurement of State Papers.

In 1989 the DIEZPO was re-organized as Publishing Center "Marka". Following the dissolution of the Soviet Union it became subordinated to the Ministry of Communications of the Russian Federation.

Order no. 348 of the Ministry of Communications of the Russian Federation issued on October 3, 1992 "On approval of the Regulations on State postal payment marks and special postal stamps of the Russian Federation" defined the company's role as selling state postage stamps for collectibles and other uses.

Clause 1.8 of the order of the Ministry of Communications of the Russian Federation dated May 26, 1994 No. 115 stipulates that postal payment marks are introduced into postal circulation by orders of the Marka Publishing Center (stamped envelopes and cards). Clause 5.7 of that order stipulated that the publishing and trading center "Marka", in addition to providing applications for postal payment stamps of the Federal Postal Service, sells Indicias from the moment they go into postal circulation (as philatelic material) other legal entities and individuals.

On January 24, 2017, the Publishing and Trade Center "Marka" was reorganized into the Joint Stock Company "Marka" (AO "Marka"), 100% of the shares of which belonged to the state. By the end of the year, 36 branch stores were opened in various cities of Russia. A presidential decree transferred the company to the direct ownership of the Russian Post.
