= Mongol Post =

National post service of Mongolia

- Type: Joint-stock company
- Industry: Postal services, courier
- Founded: 1 November 1994; 31 years ago
- Headquarters: Ulaanbaatar, Mongolia
- Area served: Mongolia
- Services: Letter post, parcel service, delivery, EMS, logistics
- Revenue: 10.8 billion tugrik annual report 2016
- Number of employees: 900 (2016)
- Website: mongolpost.mn

Mongol Post (Mongolian: Монгол Шуудан) is the national postal service of Mongolia. The formerly state-owned Mongol Post was transformed into a joint stock company on April 11, 2016, by offering 34 percent of the total shares to the public. It was founded by the Mongolian People's Republic in 1935 and went under several different names before its current structure was established in 1994. The Mongol Post JSC is charge of postal services, delivery and issuing of postage stamps. The headquarters are in Ulaanbaatar, and the company employs over 900 people and has over 389 post offices.

== Services ==
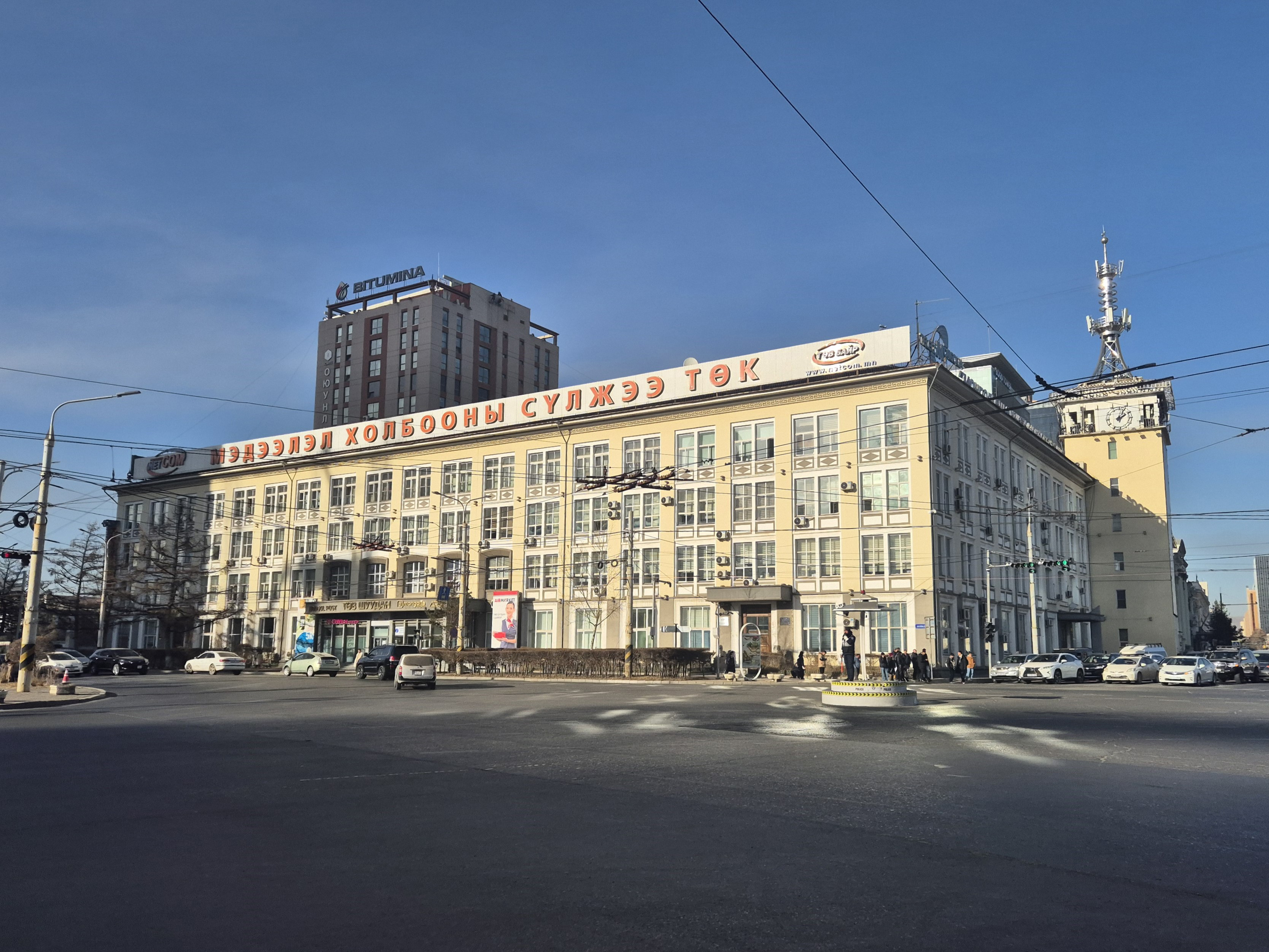
Central Post Office in Ulaanbaatar, Mongolia

The company is charged with providing the following postal and communication services at the post offices.

- Basic postal services (handling and delivering mail and parcels)
- Additional postal services (registered mail, customer pick-up, P.O. box, logistics, sales of postal products such as postcards, envelopes, and stamps)
- International postal services
- Express Mail Services (EMS)
- Postal Insurance

Of Mongolia's 3 million inhabitants, 30% are nomadic, and 61% of Ulaanbaatar's population live in informal settlements. This population had "no consistent addressing system" until May 2016 when Mongol Post started using a geocoding system provided by what3words.

== History ==
The modern postal system of Mongolia started with the establishment of a state committee for post and telegraph by the Mongolian People's Republic. From 1935 the postal system had a succession of names commencing as the 'City Post Committee', including 'Central Post', 'Telegraph, Post and Communication Office', until 2002 when finally renamed Mongol Post.

The 'Mongol Post Bank', a private bank that operated from 1994 to 2009, was never related to the 'Mongol Post' organisation.

== International postal service ==
For international mail, as of 2020, the following postal rates apply:

- postcard — 6000 tugriks;
- a letter weighing up to 20 g — 3200 tugriks;
- package (for 1 kg) — from 18 to 32 US dollars;
- depending on the country of destination.

Express mail is available to a limited number of foreign countries. The postal rate for a 1 kg parcel ranges from $29 to $48, depending on the country of destination.

In addition to the official postal operator, the following express delivery services operate in Mongolia:

- EMS;
- DHL;
- TNT etc.

== Mongol Shuudan Bank ==
In 1993, the Post Bank of Mongolia (Mongol. Mongol Shuudan Bank, English Mongol Post Bank) was established. However, by the second half of the 2000s, the bank had large tax debts to the state. In 2009, a decision was made to merge the institution with the Savings Bank of Mongolia (Mong. Khadgalamzhiin Bank, English Savings Bank), which was successfully completed in 2010.

== See also ==
- Postage stamps and postal history of Mongolia
- Mongol Shuudan, a rock band from Russia named after the Mongol Post
