= Mongol Shuudan (band) =

Russian punk rock band

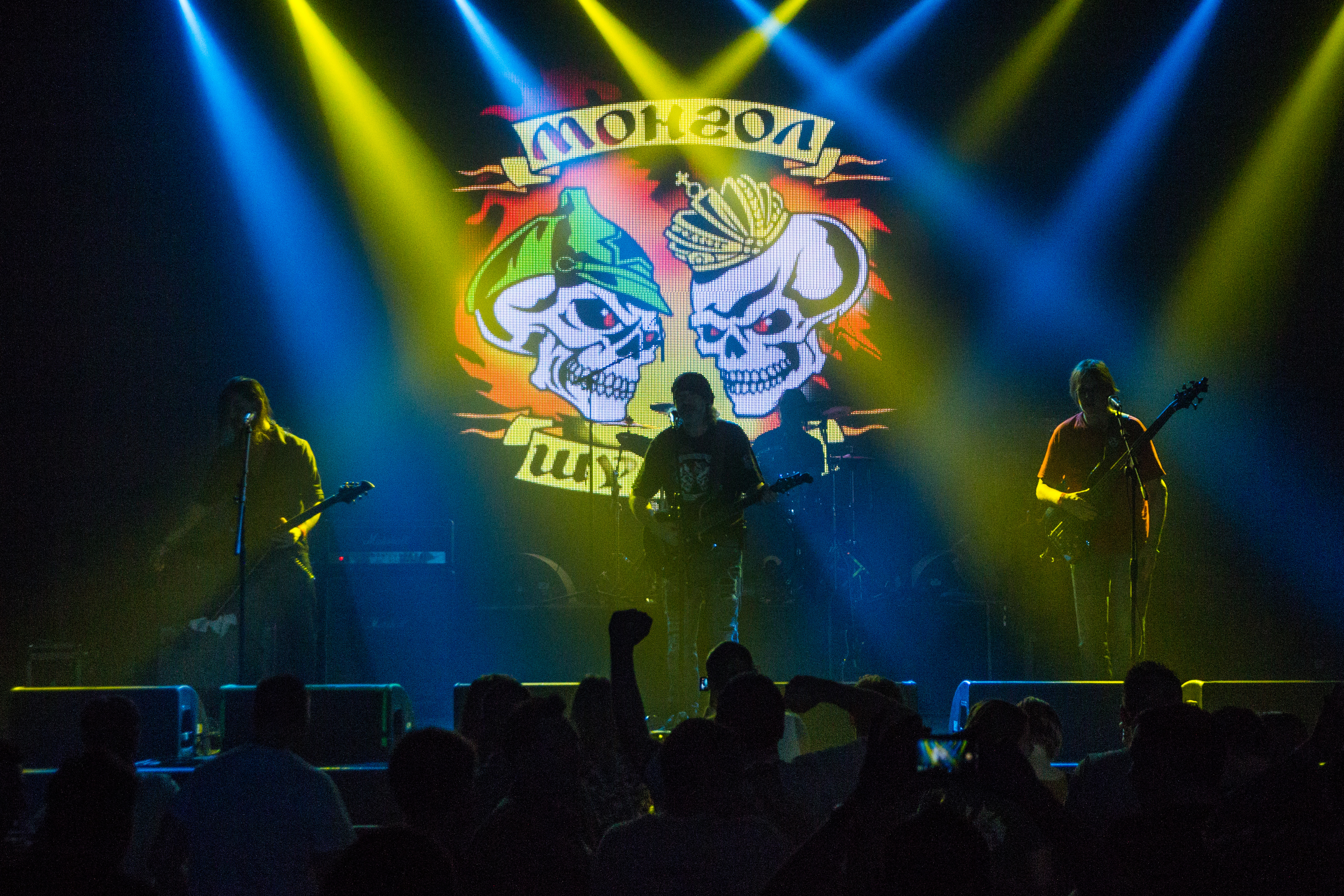
- Mongol Shuudan performing in Saint Petersburg, 2015

Background information
- Origin: Moscow, Russia
- Genres: Punk rock; folk punk; anarcho-punk; hardcore punk; alternative metal; thrash metal
- Years active: 1988-present
- Members: Valeriy Skoroded; Sergey Kryuchkov; Aleksey Portnov; Anton Ginzburg
- Past members: Vadim Kotelnikov; Aleksey Polyankov; Vladimir Dyagel
- Website: http://www.mongolshuudan.ru/

Mongol Shuudan (Russian: Монгол Шуудан, IPA: [mɐnˈɡoɫ ʂu.uˈdan], Mongolian pronunciation: [mɔɴ.ɢʊɮ ˈɕʊːtaŋ]) is a rock band formed in Moscow in 1988.

"Монгол Шуудан" means "Mongol Post" in the Mongolian language. This unusual choice is explained by the band vocalist Valeri Skoroded very simply: the band was standing at a bus stop next to a Soyuzpechat kiosk and their eyes were caught by fancy postage stamps with the exotic words on them.

The group's music is mostly anti-governmental, pro-anarchist in its message, with the group identifying themselves with the Black Guards and the Makhnovshchina of the Russian Civil War.

Many of their songs are modernized versions of anarchist civil war songs. Some of their songs include "Commissar," "Chekist," "Freedom or Death," "Sabbath on the Bald Mountain", "trin trava" , and so forth.

The band has performed over 100 shows and toured Europe, and throughout the Russian Federation.

== Genre ==
The musicians themselves define the genre as "anarcho-rock". The genre of various songs of the group can be defined as punk, ska-punk, hardcore-punk, heavy metal, grunge, chanson and most recently Speed metal . The main theme of the songs is the theme of the Russian Civil War. The early work of the group was influenced by the band DK, but "Mongol Shuudan" is a rather original group that has created its own signature style - songs in the style of the Makhnovshchina, which is dominant in the work of the group.

In 1994, a journalist from New Hot Rock noted that “Mongol Shuudan seems to be the most interesting phenomenon in Russian rock to lovers of Russian exotica, as well as to underage punks and various intellectuals”.

Answering a question about their attitude towards politics and religion, the group’s leader, Valery Skoroded, stated: “We are against everyone – we are for vodka!”.

== Members (2025) ==
- Valeriy Skoroded (Валерий Скородед) – vocal, guitar, all texts
- Eugeniy Put'makov aka Nicholas Crowen (Евгений Путьмаков) – bass
- Sergey Kryuchkov (Сергей Крючков) – lead guitar
- Aleksey Portnov (Алексей Портнов) – drums
- Gleb Gorshkov (Глеб Горшков) – sound engineering

== Discography ==
- 1989 "Паровоз анархия"
- 1991 "Гуляй поле"
- 1991 "Бандитский альбом"
- 1992 "Черемуха"
- 1993 "Собачья чушь"
- 1994 "Гомерический хохот"
- 1995 "Чересчур"
- 1996 "Истина"
- 1997 "ALIVE"
- 1999 "Абрикосы"
- 2001 "Дюжинолетие"
- 2001 "Скатертью дорога"
- 2002 "Choisis de.."
- 2002 "Свобода или смерть"
- 2003 "Жертва"
- 2004 "Заплати и свободен"
- 2004 "Сплошь и рядом"
- 2006 "Вечная мерзлота"
- 2006 "Собственность—это кража"
- 2011 "Естественный отбор"
- 2018 "Инстинкт агрессивности"
- 2019 "Паровоз Анархия Реинкарнация"
- 2019 "Гуляй Поле Реанимация"
- 2022 "Чересчур Реконструкция"
- 2024 "Ремешок"

Unfinished timeline.
