= Michel Liphschutz =

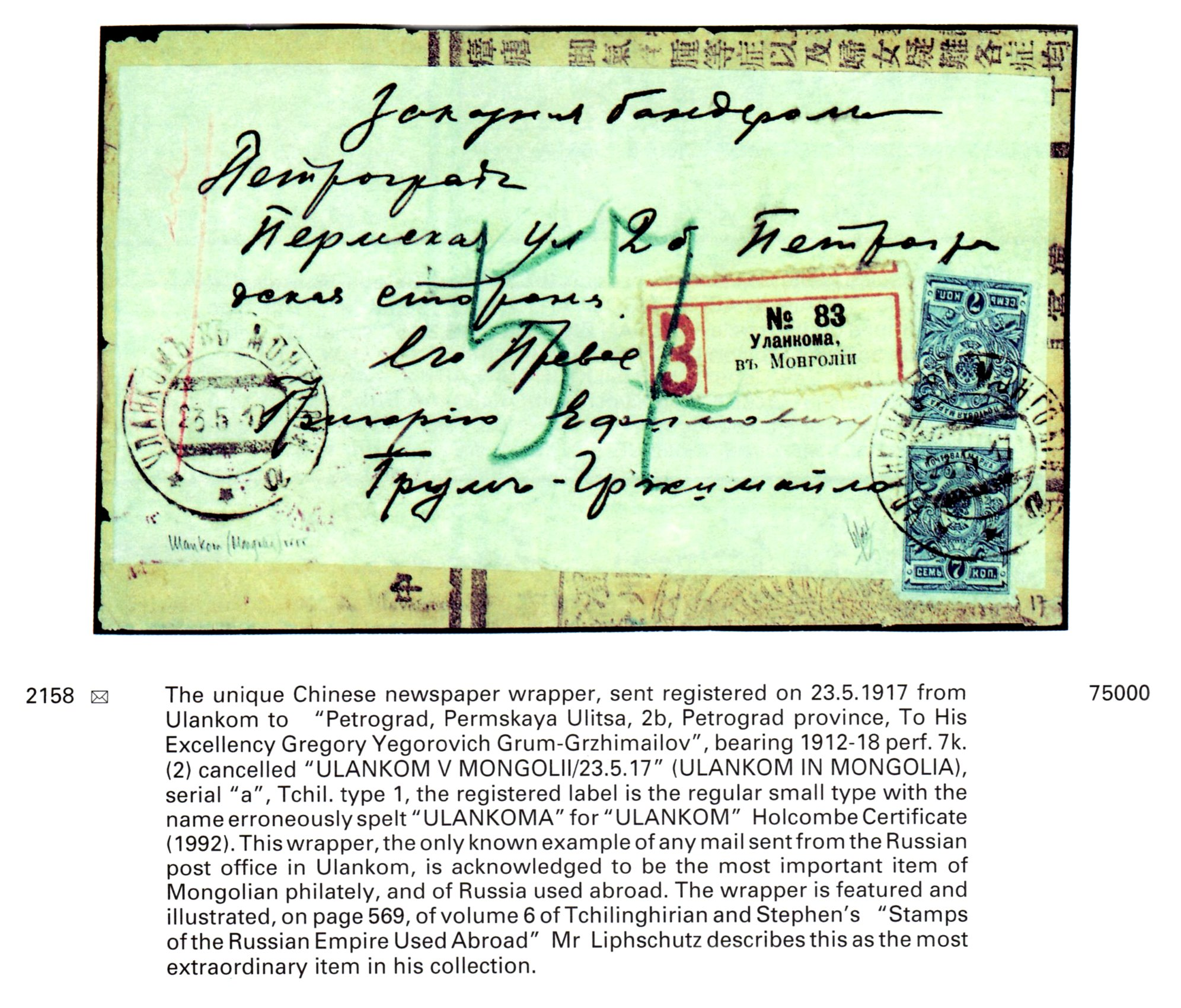
The 1917 "Ulankom" newspaper wrapper, the only known mail from the Russian post office in Ulankom, Mongolia.

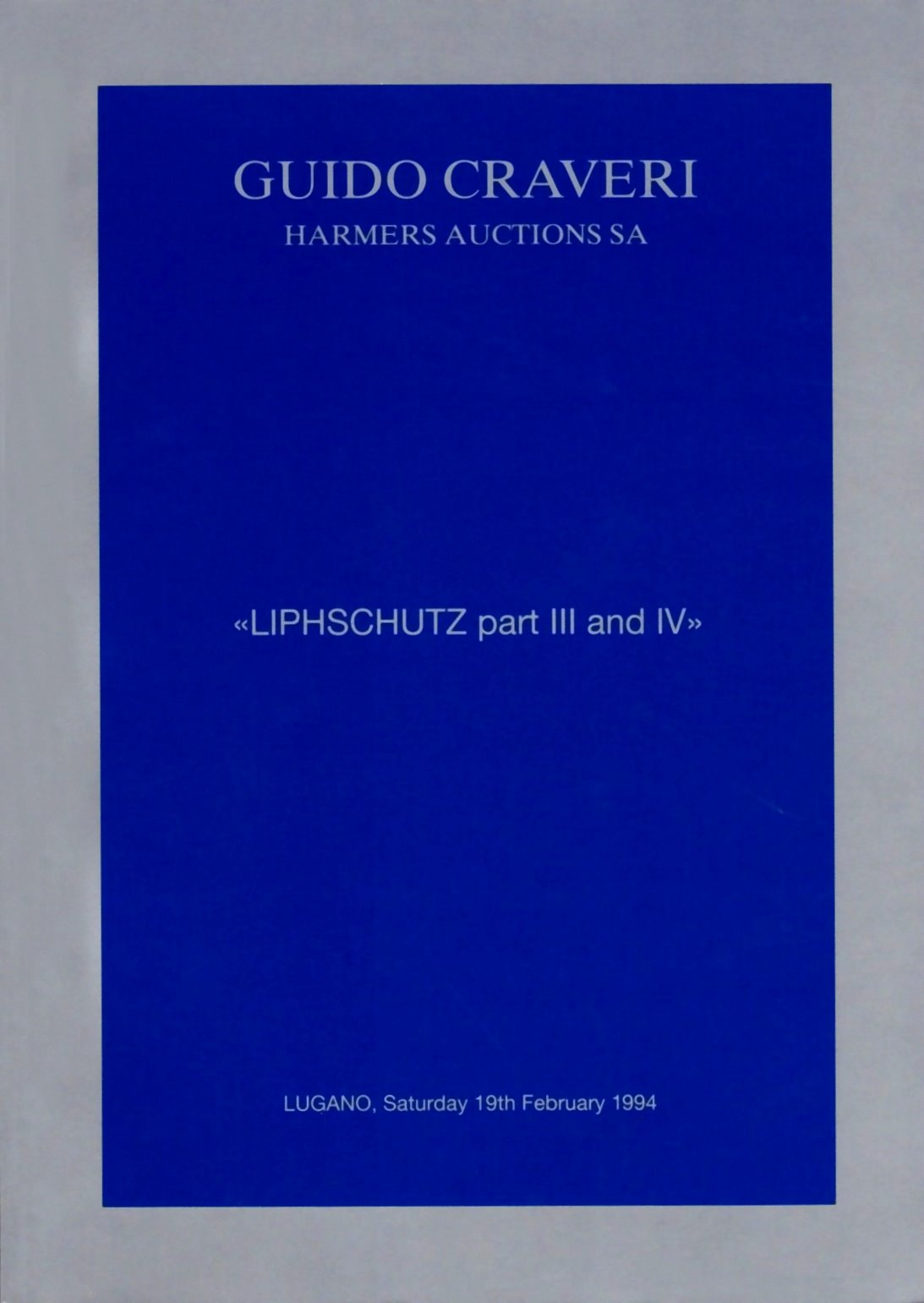
The catalogue for parts III and IV of the Liphschutz sale, 1994.

Michel Liphschutz (25 February 1910 – 5 September 1994) was a Russian philatelist who was entered on the Roll of Distinguished Philatelists in 1968. He was a specialist in the early stamps of Russia, including Zemstvo issues and Russian post offices abroad, the RSFSR and the Soviet Union.

== Early life ==
Michel Liphschutz was born in St Petersburg on 25 February 1910. In 1922, his parents moved to Paris with their son and daughter, leaving part of the family in Russia. A chemist and engineer, he started his industrial career in France in 1934, quickly growing his professional position thanks to his intelligence and dynamism.

== Collecting ==
Liphschutz began collecting Russian stamps in 1944, and over 50 years of dedicated research amassed the second greatest collection of Russian stamps in the world, second only to that of Oleg Fabergé. Particularly impressive was his collection of first issues, including many rarities. His collection of Russia No. 1 consisted of more than 300 copies, preceded by over 40 different unadopted essays of the famous Mercury or Eagle types (1854–57). He was one of the first to assemble an "ultimate" specialized collection of RSFSR and Soviet Union, during a time when those areas were quite unpopular. The world's first reference catalogue to be published on the subject (by the Cercle Philatélique France URSS in 1969) was largely based on the Liphschutz collection.

His Zemstvo and Russian Post Offices Abroad collections were some of the best ever realised. One of the greatest gems, in his own words, was the Mongolian "Ulankom" cover that he discovered in the 1940s. Unafraid of paying the price for a rare piece, he once lost during an auction the unique 1858 set in mint blocks of four (Mi 2–4), realizing that he had lost for basing his bids on the market's estimation, and not on his own wishes. When the same set was again offered 20 years later, he sent a French dealer in New York the sole instruction "BUY": he didn't want to make the same mistake twice.

Liphschutz was an educated scholar. Contemporaries tell of visiting the Liphschutz residence in Neuilly sur Seine, where they would exchange their views and knowledge surrounded by books. His life was of course much more than stamps; he spent time in the Soviet Union locating family members who were listed as missing after World War II. He was also known for having done a lot to help his family. His sister Ida was a medical doctor running a clinic in the south of France.

== Organised philately ==
A high level philatelist, Liphschutz was a member of the French Académie de Philatélie since 1958, signed the prestigious Roll of Distinguished Philatelists (RDP) in 1968, became President of the Académie de Philatélie in 1980 and second president of the Cercle Philatélique France URSS (after Gabriel Citerne).

== Sale of his collection ==
His prestigious collections were sold in Switzerland by Guido Craveri/Harmers in a series of auctions in 1993/94. The catalogues of those sales continue to be an important reference for collectors of this field.
