= Russian post offices in the Ottoman Empire =

The Russian post offices in the Ottoman Empire were a set of post offices operated by Russia in various cities of the Ottoman Empire from the late 18th century until September 1914.

== Earliest mails ==
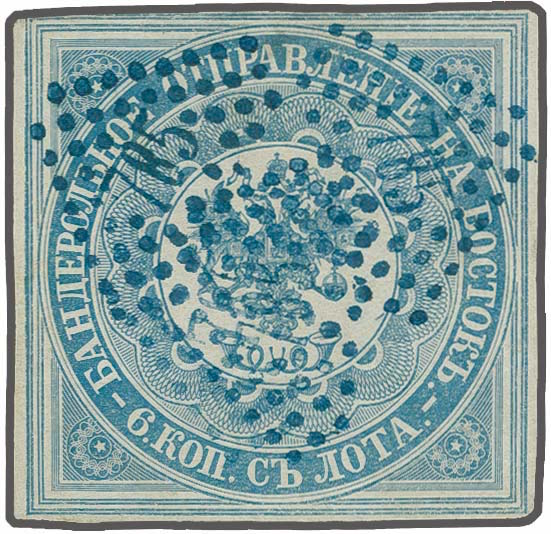
An extremely rare 6-kopeck stamp of 1863

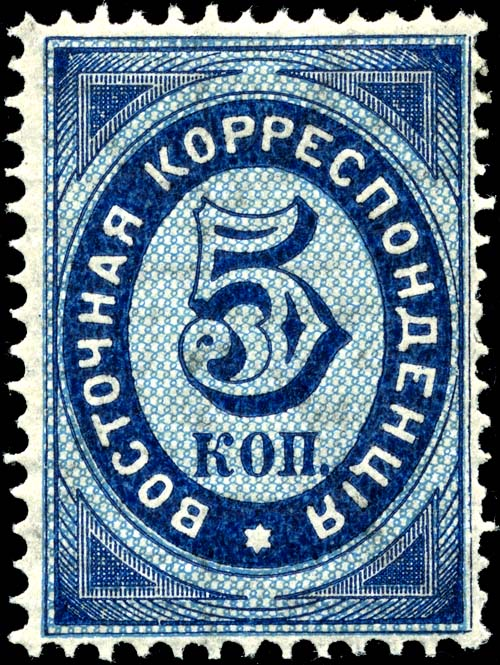
A 5-kopeck stamp of 1872

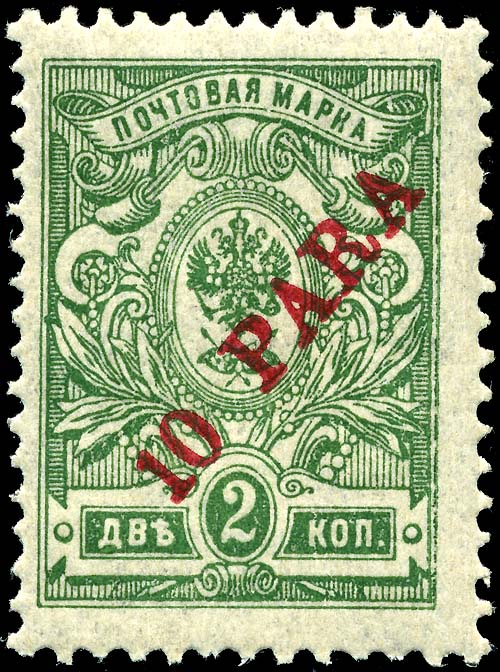
A 10-para overprint of 1910

The earliest mail service between St Petersburg and Constantinople consisted of diplomatic pouches carried from 1721 on. The Treaty of Küçük Kaynarca in 1774 provided for a regular mail service, for which a consular post office was established in Constantinople. It began using handstamped postal markings around 1830. Beginning in 1779 a mail boat circulated between Constantinople and Kherson, and 1781 saw the establishment of an overland route through Bucharest to Bratzlav.

In 1856, the Russian Steam Navigation and Trading Company (Russkoe Obschchestvo Parokhodstva i Torgovli or РОПиТ, ROPiT) took over postal operations. It handled mail service between the various offices, and funneled mail to the rest of Russia through Odessa. The ROPiT offices received a status equivalent to regular Russian post offices in 1863.

== First stamps ==
The first postage stamp of the offices was a large square design issued in 1863 and valued at six kopecks. This type is today rare, as were the normal-sized 2k and 20k stamps issued in 1865, which included a sailing ship along with the imperial coat of arms, and "ROPiT" in the inscription. A similar but better-executed design appeared in 1866.

Beginning in 1868, ROPiT switched to a design consisting of a large number of value in the center. As with the regular Russian stamps, they were originally printed on horizontally-laid paper, and on vertically-laid paper from 1872 on. Overprints for 8 kopeck and 7 kopeck values were used in 1876 and 1879. The colors were changed in 1879, and again in 1884, matching the contemporaneous stamps of Russia.

Beginning in 1900, the printing of special stamps was abandoned, in conjunction with the use of the local Ottoman currency of paras and piastres. Instead, regular Russian stamps were surcharged.

== Anniversary stamps ==
In 1909, a 50th-anniversary commemorative issue was produced by substituting the ROPiT sailing ship logo in the place of the imperial eagle. 1909 also saw the issuance of these stamps overprinted in French with the names of cities where the Russian post offices were located: "Beyrouth" - Beirut, "Constantinople" - Constantinople, "Dardanelles" - Dardanelles, "Jaffa" - Jaffa, "Jerusalem" - Jerusalem, "Kerassunde" - Giresun,"Mersine", "Mételin" - Mytilene, "Mont Athos" - Mount Athos, "Rizeh" - Rize, "Salonique" - Salonica, "Smyrne" - Smyrna, "Trebizonde" - Trabzon.

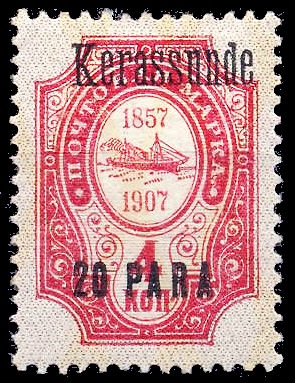

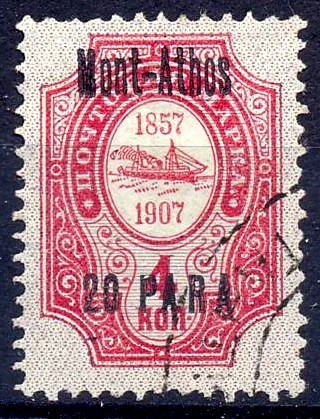

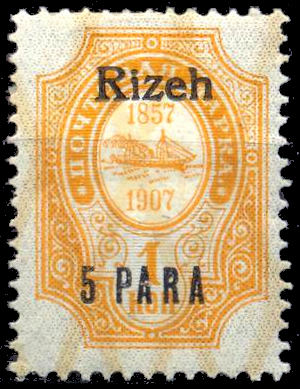

== See also ==
- Postage stamps and postal history of Russia

== References and sources ==
References

- Rossiter, Stuart & John Flower. The Stamp Atlas. London: Macdonald, 1986, pp. 214–215. ISBN 0-356-10862-7

Sources

- Scott catalog
- Stanley Gibbons Ltd: various catalogues
- AskPhil – Glossary of Stamp Collecting Terms
- Encyclopaedia of Postal History
