= Russian post offices in Crete =

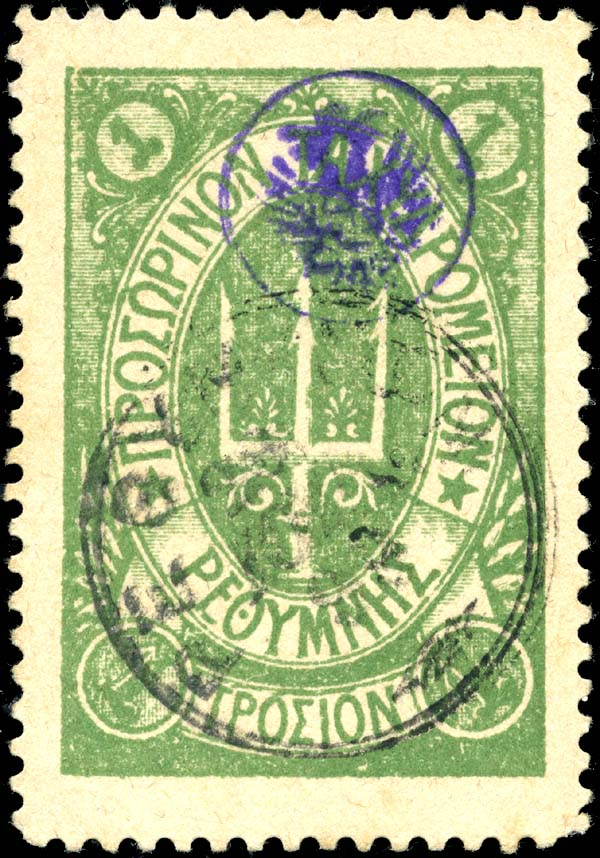
A one grosion green stamp with stars

The Russian post offices in Crete were established by Russia in the area of Crete it occupied as part of the joint occupying force that arrived in 1898.

Russia issued postage stamps for its district of Rethymno(n) in 1899. However, the postal service operated for only a very short period, from May to July.

A first set of four stamps was produced by handstamping two designs, both based on the imperial Russian double eagle emblem. One design was inscribed with colorless Greek letters in colored scrolls; the one metallik value was handstamped in green, while the two metallik was issued first in rose-red shades and then in black. The other design used colored Latin letters on a white background, and appeared only as a one metallik value in blue.

Regularly printed stamps came out later in 1899, printed by Grundman & Stangel of Athens, using a design based on Poseidon's trident. They came in three values, one and two metallik and one grosion (equivalent to four metallik or one piastre), and seven colors (orange, green, yellow, rose, lilac, blue, and black). A third set was issued using a variation of this design, adding five-pointed stars in the frame around the trident, and was printed in blue, rose, green, and lilac.

The stamps also received a violet or blue control mark, in the form of a double eagle, before being issued. They are known without the control mark, and have been extensively counterfeited as, for example, in the example shown in the picture above. It is a forged stamp with a forged control mark and a forged postmark.

The Cretan government issued its own stamps on 1 March 1900; see postage stamps and postal history of Crete.

== See also ==
- Postage stamps and postal history of Russia

== References and sources ==
References

- Feenstra, Rienk M. (2001). Crete: Postal History, Postage and Revenue Stamps, Coins & Banknotes. Athens: Collectio. pp. 65–90. ISBN 960-85275-6-2.
- Karamitsos, A. (2004). Hellas 2004: stamp catalog and postal history, Volume II. Thessaloniki: A. Karamitsos. pp. 234–238. ISBN 960-87500-6-7.
- Vlastos (2004). Vlastos 2005, Volume 3, Hellenic Territories. Orestes Vlastos. pp. 249–258.
- Wellsted; Rossiter; Flower (1986). The Stamp Atlas. Macdonald. pp. 124–125. ISBN 0-8160-1346-2.

Sources

- Scott catalogue
- Stanley Gibbons Ltd: various catalogues
- AskPhil – Glossary of Stamp Collecting Terms
- Encyclopaedia of Postal History
