= Dziewulski =

Dziewulski may refer to:

- Dziewulski (crater), a lunar crater
- Dziewulski (surname), a Polish surname
