= Dziewulski (surname) =

Dziewulski (feminine: Dziewulska; plural: Dziewulscy) is a Polish surname. Notable people with this surname include:

- Jan Dziewulski, founder of Opoczno S.A., the largest producer of ceramic tiles in Poland
- Jerzy Dziewulski (1943–2025), Polish politician
- Marcin Dziewulski (born 1982), Polish footballer
- Maria Dziewulska (1909–2006), Polish composer and music educator
- Władysław Dziewulski (1878–1962), Polish astronomer and mathematician
