= Moebius =

Moebius, Möbius, Mœbius or Mobius may refer to:

== Mathematics ==
- Möbius strip (also Möbius band or Möbius loop), a non-orientable surface
- Möbius transformation, a conformal map in complex analysis
- Möbius inversion formula, a theorem in number theory
- Möbius function, an arithmetic function in number theory

== Medicine ==
- Möbius syndrome (or Moebius syndrome), a neurological disorder

== People ==
- August Ferdinand Möbius (1790–1868), German mathematician and astronomer
- Theodor Möbius (1821–1890), German philologist, son of August Ferdinand
- Karl Möbius (1825–1908), German zoologist and ecologist
- Paul Julius Möbius (1853–1907), German neurologist, grandson of August Ferdinand
- Friedrich Möbius (art historian) (1928–2024), German art historian and architectural historian
- Mark Mobius (1936–2026), American-born German emerging markets fund manager
- Jean Giraud (1938–2012), French comics artist who used the pseudonym Mœbius
- Dieter Moebius (1944–2015), Swiss-born German musician

== Fictional characters ==
- Mobius M. Mobius, a character in Marvel Comics
- Anti-Monitor, also known as Mobius, DC Comics character
- Johann Wilhelm Möbius, a character in the play The Physicists by Friedrich Dürrenmatt
- Mobius, or Dr. Ignatio Mobius, a character in the Command & Conquer series
- Moebius the Timestreamer, a character in the Legacy of Kain series
- Mobius 1, the call sign of the main character of Ace Combat 04: Shattered Skies
- Mobius, the main antagonist of the Old World Blues DLC of Fallout: New Vegas
- Mobius, a character from the game Honkai Impact 3rd
- Moebius, the main antagonist of Fresh Pretty Cure!

== Fictional entities ==
- Moebius Foundation and its military wing Moebius Corps, a faction in StarCraft II
- Mobius, the main antagonist organization from The Evil Within series
- Moebius, the main antagonistic faction in the video game Xenoblade Chronicles 3
- Mobius, an Earth-like planet and setting of several early Sonic the Hedgehog adaptations on TV and in comics
- Moebius, a gang in the Tokyo Revengers manga

== Art, media and entertainment ==
- Mobius Artists Group, international group of experimental artists

=== Television and film ===
- "Moebius" (Stargate SG-1), a 2005 two-part episode of the science fiction TV series Stargate SG-1
- Moebius (1996 film), an Argentine film
- Moebius (2013 film), a South Korean film
- Möbius (film), a Russian-French 2013 film with Jean Dujardin
- Mobius (TV series), a 2025 Chinese science fiction series

=== Music ===
- Mobius Band, an American electronic rock trio
- Mobius (album), a 1975 album by pianist Cedar Walton
- "The Moebius", a song by Orbital on Orbital, 1991
- "Mobius", a song by A Tribe Called Quest on the 2016 album entitled: We Got It from Here... Thank You 4 Your Service

=== Video games ===
- Moebius: The Orb of Celestial Harmony (1985)
- Moebius: Empire Rising (2014)
- Mobius Final Fantasy (2015)

== Organizations and companies ==
- Mobius Digital, the developer of Outer Wilds
- Rockstar Leeds, formerly known as Möbius Entertainment
- MOBIUS, a library consortium in Missouri, United States
- Moebius Models, a company that makes plastic scale models.
- Mobius Motors, a Kenyan car manufacturer
- Mobius, an American publisher owned by Hachette UK

== Science and technology ==
- Möbius (crater), a lunar crater
- Mobius Discovery Center, a science museum in Spokane, Washington, United States

== See also ==
- Morbius (disambiguation)
- Ultraman Mebius, a Japanese television series, and the titular superhero
- Mevius, a derivative of the name Möbius used as a brand name for Japanese cigarettes
