= A.S. Popov Central Museum of Communications =

Postal and telecommunications museum in Saint Petersburg, Russia

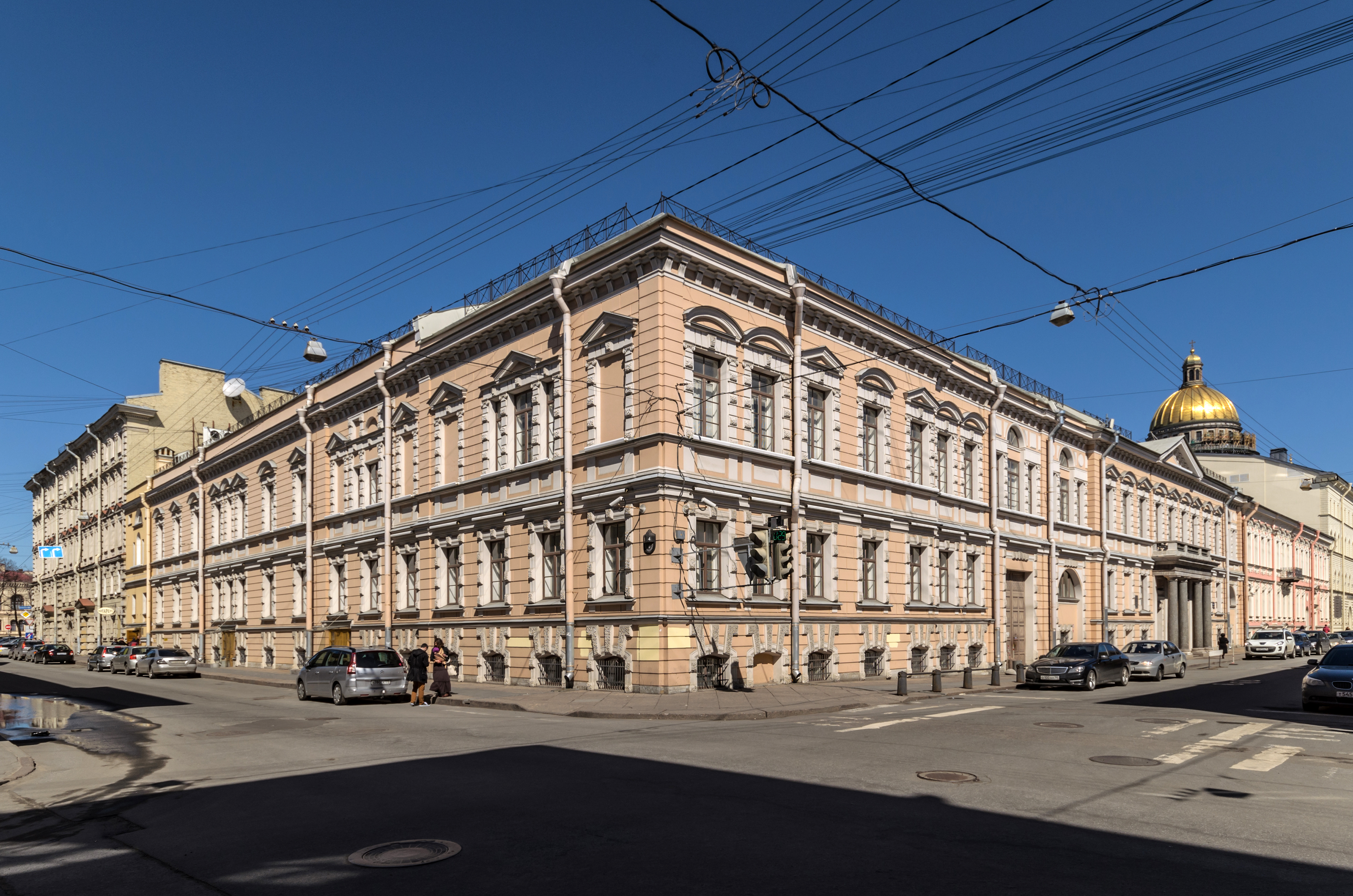
- The museum building

- Location within Saint Petersburg
- Established: 11 September 1872; 153 years ago
- Location: Saint Petersburg, Russia
- Coordinates: 59.932581°N 30.301967°E
- Type: postal & telecommunications museum
- Key holdings: Russian National Collection of Philately
- Collections: stamps, documents, devices
- Director: Alexander I. Burdin (as of 2015)
- Website: www.rustelecom-museum.ru

The A.S. Popov Central Museum of Communications is a museum of science and technology founded in 1872. It is located in the historic centre of Saint Petersburg, Russia, near Saint Isaac's Square.

== History ==
The museum was opened on 11 September 1872 as the Telegraph Museum. The head of the Telegraph Department of Russia Carl Luders proclaimed the foundation of this museum:

…For the purpose of familiarisation of all the telegraph workers and other interested persons with all innovations and improvements in the field of telegraphy, it is proposed to organise a permanent museum in Saint Petersburg, based on objects presented at the Moscow Polytechnic Exhibition…

In 1884, the post office branch was added and the museum was transformed into the Postal and Telegraph Museum.

In 1945, the museum was named after the Russian scientist and inventor Alexander Stepanovich Popov.

By the late 1970s, the museum housed more than 4 million stamps, stamped envelopes, and postcards.

Nowadays, the museum is a leading institution in its field in the Russian Federation. As such, it provides consulting supervision for other telecommunications museums.

== Collections ==
The museum archives and collections include over 8 million items including:

- documents and items related to the history of post, telegraph and telephone, radio and broadcasting, space communication, and modern means of telecommunications,
- 15,000 apparatuses and technical pieces,
- 50,000 archival documents,
- vast collections of stamps and postal stationery, including 8 million items of the Russian National Collection of Philately,
- 50,000 books and periodicals of the specialised research library.

== Address ==
The museum is situated at the address: 7 Pochtamtskaya Street, Saint Petersburg, 190000, Russia.

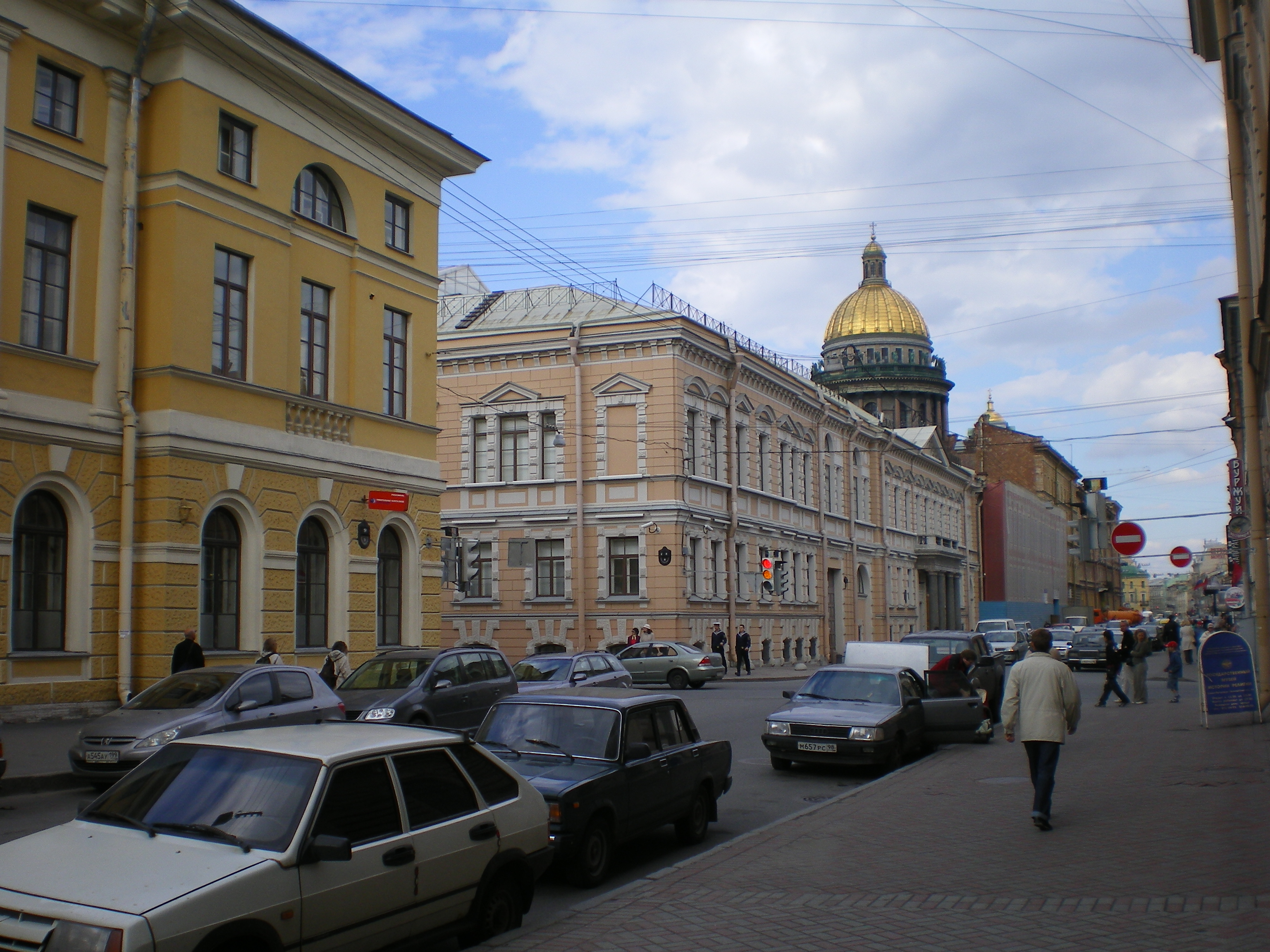
View of the museum
at Pochtamtskaya Street

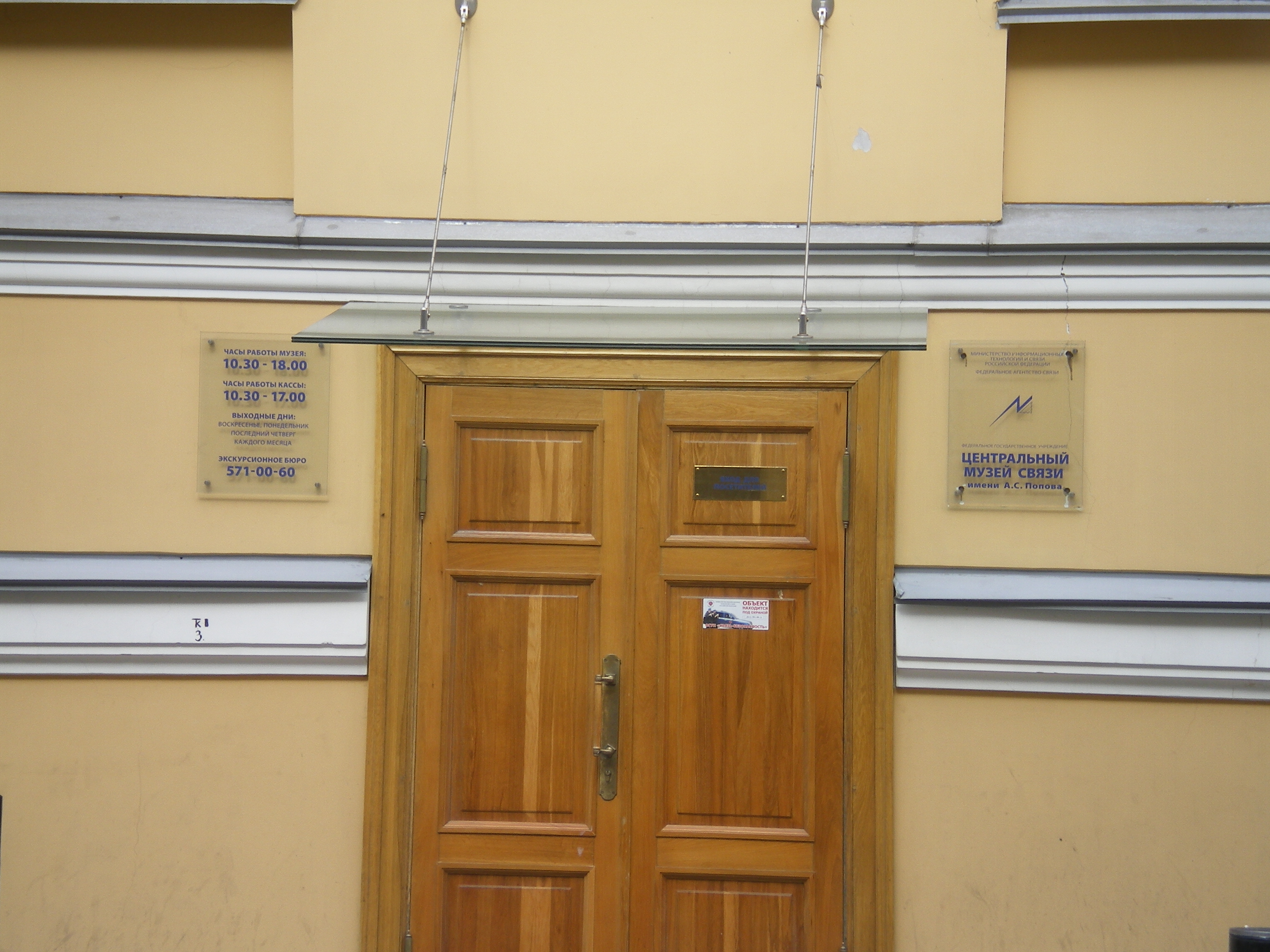
Main museum entrance
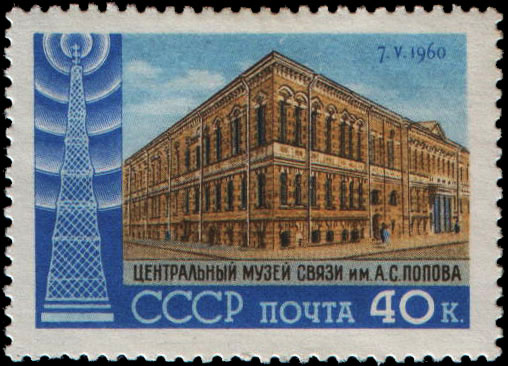
1960 USSR stamp celebrating Radio Day and showing the museum building

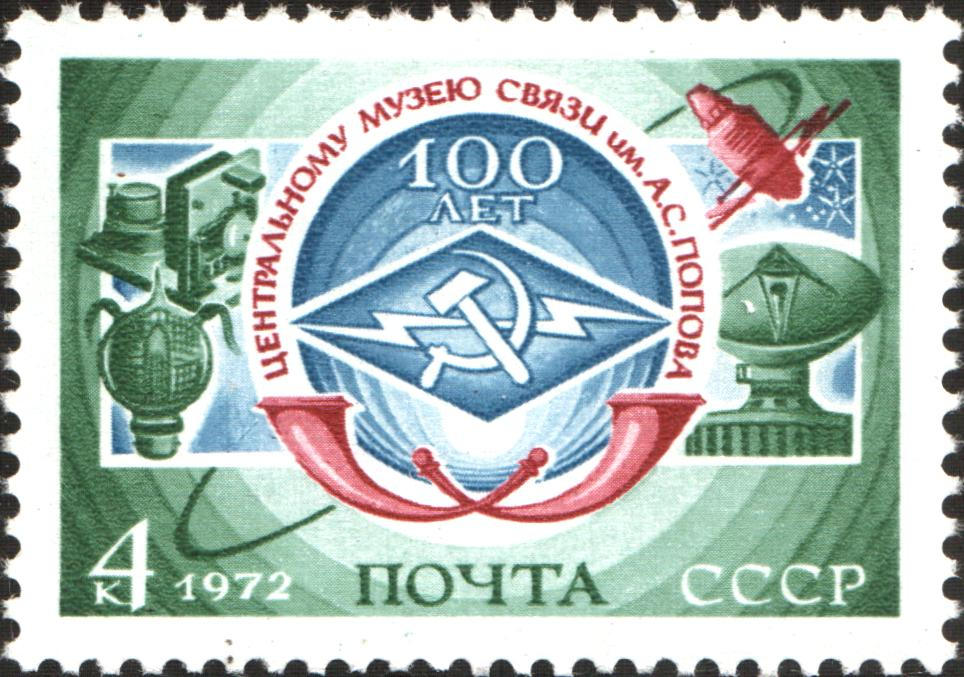
1972 USSR stamp commemorating the 100th anniversary of the museum

== See also ==
- List of philatelic museums
- Ministry of Communications and Mass Media (Russia)
- Polytechnic Museum
- Postage stamps and postal history of Russia
- Postal museum
- Russian Post
- Soviet and post-Soviet postage rates
- Telecommunications in Russia
