= Aleksandr Popov (physicist) =

Russian physicist (1859–1906)

Alexander Popov
- Александр Попов
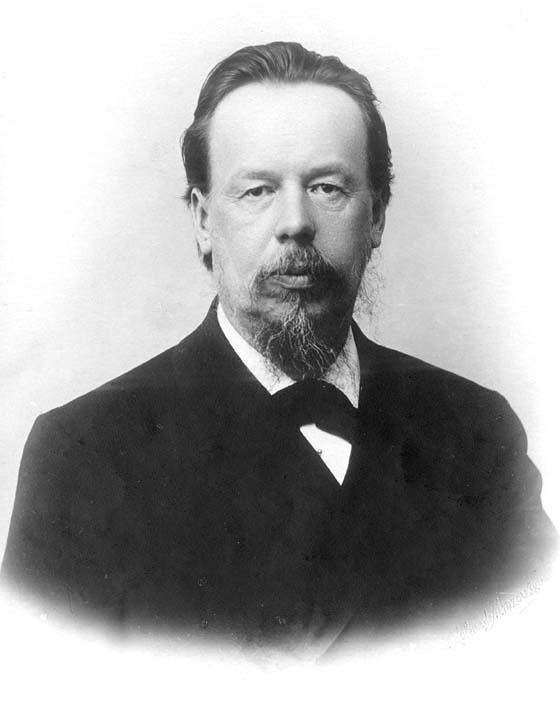
- Born: Alexander Stepanovich Popov; 16 March 1859; Turyinskiye Rudniki, Perm Governorate, Russian Empire
- Died: 13 January 1906 (aged 46); St. Petersburg, Russian Empire
- Resting place: Volkovo Cemetery, St. Petersburg
- Known for: Radio
- Awards: Order of St. Anna III (1895); Silver medal of Alexander III (1896); Order of Saint Stanislaus II (1897); Prize of Russian Technical Society (1898); Order of St. Anna II (1902)

Alexander Stepanovich Popov (sometimes spelled Popoff; Russian: Александр Степанович Попов; 16 March [O.S. 4 March] 1859 – 13 January 1906 [O.S. 31 December 1905]) was a Russian physicist who was one of the first people to invent a radio receiving device.

Popov's work as a teacher at a Russian naval school led him to explore high-frequency electrical phenomena. On 7 May 1895, he presented a paper on a wireless lightning detector he had built that worked via using a coherer to detect radio noise from lightning strikes. This day is celebrated today in Russia as Radio Day. In a 24 March 1896 demonstration, he transmitted radio signals 250 meters between different campus buildings in St. Petersburg. His work was based on that of another physicist, Oliver Lodge, and contemporaneous with the work of Guglielmo Marconi.

== Early life ==
Born in the town of Krasnoturyinsk, currently Sverdlovsk Oblast, in the Urals as the son of a priest, he became interested in natural sciences when he was a child. His father wanted Alexander to join the priesthood and sent him to the Seminary School at Yekaterinburg. There he developed an interest in science and mathematics and instead of going on to Theology School in 1877 he enrolled at Saint Petersburg University, where he studied physics. After graduation with honors in 1882, he stayed on as a laboratory assistant at the university. However, the salary at the university was inadequate to support his family, and in 1883 he took a post as teacher and head of laboratory at the Russian Navy's Torpedo School in Kronstadt on Kotlin Island.

== Radio wave receiver ==
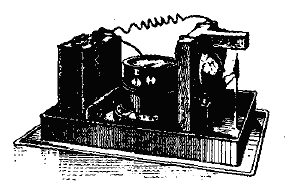
Drawing of Popov's radio wave based lightning detector

Along with his teaching duties at the naval school, Popov pursued related areas of research. Trying to solve a problem with the failure in the electrical wire insulation on steel ships (which turned out to be a problem with electrical resonance) led him to further explore oscillations of high-requency electrical currents. His interest in this area of study (including the new field of "Hertzian" or radio waves) was intensified by his trip in 1893 to the Chicago World's Columbian Exposition in the United States, where he was able to confer with other researchers in the field.

Popov also read an 1894 article about British physicist Oliver Lodge's experiments related to the discovery of radio waves by German physicist Heinrich Hertz 6 years earlier. On 1 June 1894, after the death of Hertz, British physicist Oliver Lodge gave a memorial lecture on Hertz experiments. He set up a demonstration on the quasi optical nature of Hertzian waves (radio waves) and demonstrated their transmission at distances up to 50 meters. Lodge used a detector called a coherer, a glass tube containing metal filings between two electrodes. When received waves from an antenna were applied to the electrodes, the coherer became conductive allowing the current from a battery to pass through it, with the impulse being picked up by a mirror galvanometer. After receiving a signal, the metal filings in the coherer had to be reset by a manually operated vibrator or by the vibrations of a bell placed on the table nearby that rang every time a transmission was received. Popov set to work to design a more sensitive radio wave receiver that could be used as a lightning detector, to warn of thunderstorms by detecting the electromagnetic pulses of lightning strikes using a coherer receiver.

=== Operating principle ===
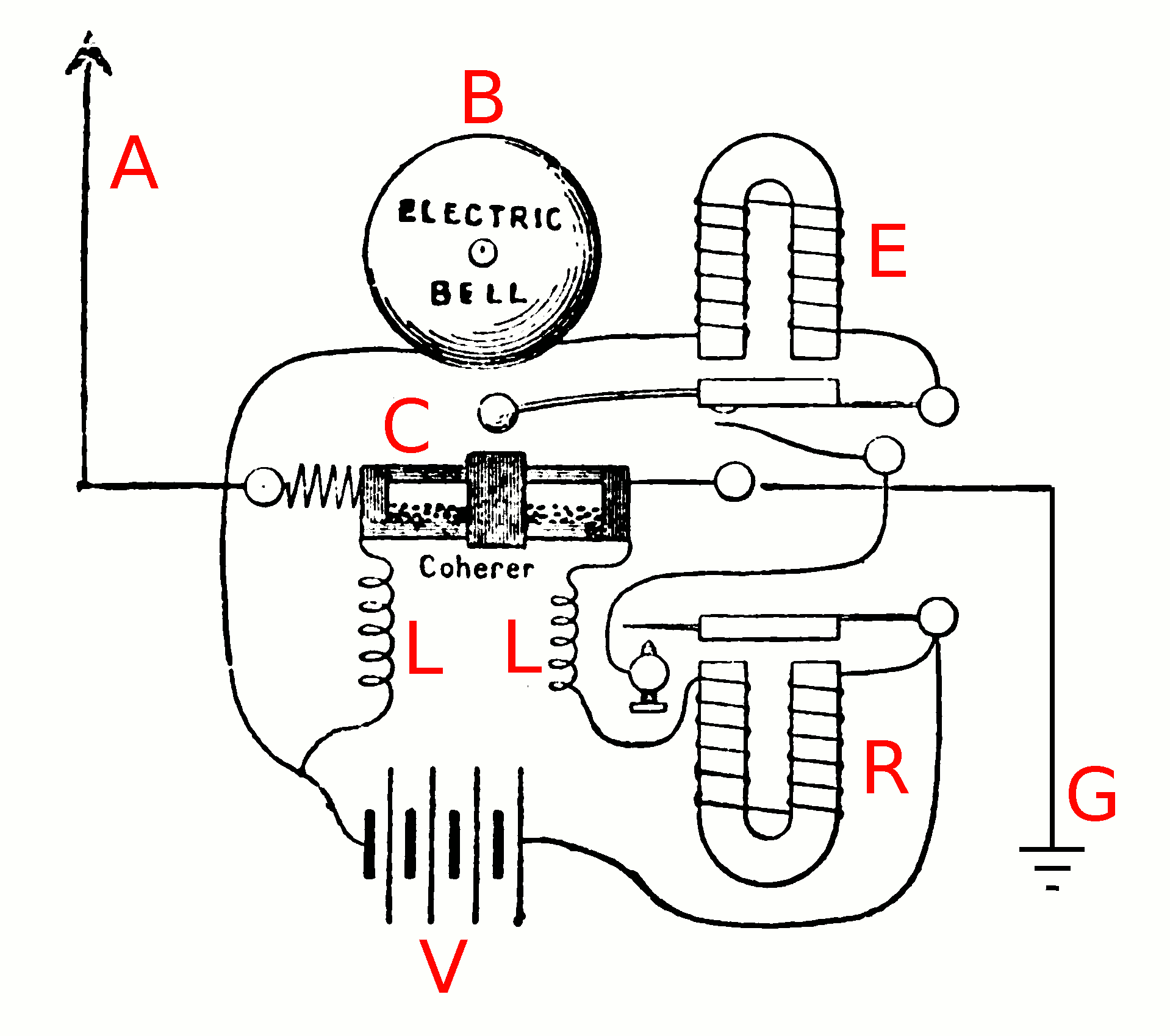
Circuit of Popov's lightning detector

In Popov's lightning detector the coherer (C) was connected to an antenna (A), and to a separate circuit with a relay (R) and battery (V) which operated an electric bell (B). The radio noise generated by a lightning strike turned on the coherer, the current from the battery was applied to the relay, closing its contacts, which applied current to the electromagnet (E) of the bell, pulling the arm over to ring the bell. Popov added an innovative automatic reset feature of a "self tapping" coherer where the bell arm would spring back and tap the coherer, restoring it to its receptive state. The two chokes (L) in the coherer's leads prevented the radio signal across the coherer from short circuiting by passing through the DC circuit. He connected his receiver to a wire antenna (A) suspended high in the air and to a ground (earth) (G). The antenna idea may have been based on a lightning rod and was an early use of a monopole wire aerial.

=== Demonstrations ===
On 7 May 1895 Popov presented the paper "On the Relation of Metallic Powders to Electric Oscillations", which described his lightning detector, to the Russian Physical and Chemical Society in St. Petersburg. Most Eastern sources regard Popov's lightning detector as the first radio receiver, and 7 May has been celebrated since 1945 in the Russian Federation as "Radio Day". However, there is no evidence Popov sent any type of message on that occasion. The first account of communication by Popov was a demonstration on 24 March 1896 at the Physical and Chemical Society, when some accounts say the Morse code message "ГЕНРИХ ГЕРЦ" ("HEINRICH HERTZ" in Russian) was received from a transmitter 250 meters away and transcribed on the blackboard by the Society president. Historian Charles Susskind in 1962 concluded that Popov did not use radio waves for actual wireless communication before mid-1896.

In 1895 Italian inventor Guglielmo Marconi began work on a purpose-built wireless telegraphy system based on "Hertzian" (radio) waves, developing a spark-gap transmitter and a much improved automatically reset coherer receiver. By mid-1895 Marconi had transmitted messages 1/2 mile (800 meters). He then came up with the idea grounding his transmitter as well as his receiver, and by mid-1896 he was transmitting radio messages a mile and a half (2400 meters). Popov and Marconi's early work seems to have been done without knowledge of each other's system, although reading Marconi's June 1896 patent disclosures led Popov to develop a long-range wireless telegraphy system.

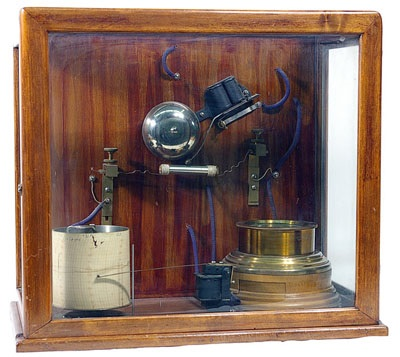
One of Popov's receivers, with chart recorder (white cylinder) to record lightning strikes

His paper on his experiments: "On the relation of metallic powders to electrical oscillations", was published 15 December 1895. He did not apply for a patent for his invention. In July 1895 he installed his receiver and a siphon recorder on the roof of the Institute of Forestry building in St. Petersburg. and was able to detect thunderstorms at a range of 50 km, however he was also aware of its communication potential. His paper, read at 7 May 1895 meeting, concluded:

I can express my hope that my apparatus will be applied for signaling at great distances by electric vibrations of high frequency, as soon as there will be invented a more powerful generator of such vibrations.

In 1896, the article depicting Popov's invention was reprinted in the 'Journal of the Russian Physical and Chemical Society'. In March 1896, he effected transmission of radio waves between different campus buildings in St. Petersburg. In November 1897, the French entrepreneur Eugène Ducretet made a transmitter and receiver based on wireless telegraphy in his own laboratory. According to Ducretet, he built his devices using Popov's lightning detector as a model. By 1898 Ducretet was manufacturing equipment of Wireless telegraphy based on Popov's instructions. At the same time Popov effected ship-to-shore communication over a distance of 6 miles in 1898 and 30 miles in 1899.

== Later work ==
In 1900 a radio station was established under Popov's instructions on Hogland island (Suursaari) to provide two-way communication by wireless telegraphy between the Russian naval base and the crew of the battleship General-Admiral Apraksin. The battleship had run aground on Hogland island in the Gulf of Finland in November 1899. The crew of the Apraksin were not in immediate danger, but the water in the Gulf began to freeze. Due to bad weather and bureaucratic red tape, the crew of Apraksin did not arrive until January 1900 to establish a wireless station on Hogland Island. By 5 February, however, messages were being received reliably. The wireless messages were relayed to Hogland Island by a station some 25 miles away at Kymi (nowadays Kotka) on the Finnish coast. Kotka was selected as the location for the wireless relay station because it was the point closest to Hogland Island served by telegraph wires connected to Russian naval headquarters.

By the time the Apraksin was freed from the rocks by the icebreaker Yermak at the end of April, 440 official telegraph messages had been handled by the Hogland Island wireless station. Besides the rescue of the Apraksin's crew, more than 50 Finnish fishermen, who were stranded on a piece of drift ice in the Gulf of Finland, were saved by the icebreaker Yermak following distress telegrams sent by wireless telegraphy. In 1901 Alexander Popov was appointed as professor at the Electrotechnical Institute. In 1905 he was elected director of the institute.

== Death ==
In 1905 he became seriously ill and died of a brain hemorrhage on 13 January 1906.

He was succeeded as head of the Russian national wireless organisation by Simeon Aisenstein with whom he had worked closely.

== Honors ==
=== Radio Day ===
In 1945 on the 50th anniversary of Popov's experiment the old Soviet Union made 7 May a new holiday, Radio Day, the day they claim Popov invented radio. Historians note this holiday may be more due to Cold War era politics than historical evidence. Radio Day is still officially marked in Russia and Bulgaria.

=== Named after ===
- A minor planet, 3074 Popov, discovered by Soviet astronomer Lyudmila Zhuravlyova in 1979.
- Crater Popov on the back side of the Moon.
- A huge conference room "Alexander Stepanovich Popov" at the ITU's headquarters in Geneva was inaugurated at the ITU Telecom World 2011 by Igor Shchyogolev, Minister of Telecom and Mass Communications of the Russian Federation alongside Hamadoun Touré, Secretary General of the ITU.

=== Monuments ===
1. Monument to A. S. Popov, Nizhny Novgorod, Museum of Radiophysics
2. Monument to A. S. Popov, Yekaterinburg, Popov Square on Pushkin Street.
3. Monument to A. S. Popov, Rostov-on-Don, Radio Frequency Center of the Southern Federal District, main entrance, 50 Budennovsky Ave., the opening took place on 7 May 2009, on Radio Day
4. Monument to A. S. Popov, Krasnoturinsk
5. Monument to A. S. Popov, Peterhof, Naval Institute of Radio Electronics named after A.S. Popov, main entrance
6. Monument to A. S. Popov, Peterhof, Naval Institute of Radio Electronics named after A.S. Popov, entrance from the Scout boulevard
7. Monument to A. S. Popov, Saint Petersburg, sculptors: V. Ya. Bogolyubov and V.V. Isaev, architect: N.V. Baranov – (1959; Kamennoostrovsky Prospekt, in the square between houses 39 and 41), at the station Petrogradskaya
8. Monument to A. S. Popov, Moscow, Alley of Scientists, Sparrow Hills, Moscow State University n.a. M.V. Lomonosov
9. Monument to A. S. Popov, Ryazan, at the main entrance to the Ryazan State Radio Engineering University
10. Monument to A. S. Popov, Kronstadt, square at the memorial museum of the inventor of radio A. S. Popov
11. Monument to A. S. Popov, Perm, architects: D. Lapshin, E. Koltsova; artist I. Dymshakov; sculptor A. Matveev
12. Monument to A. S. Popov, Kotka, Finland
13. Monument to A. S. Popov, Dnipro, st. Stoletova
14. Monument to A. S. Popov on the territory of Odessa Electrotechnical Institute of Communications named after A.S. Popov (now Odessa National Academy of # Communications named after A.S. Popov)
15. Monument to A. S. Popov, Dalmatovo in the territory of school No. 2, named after the inventor.
16. Monument to A. S. Popov, Omsk, the territory of "Radio Plant named after A. S. Popov", a bust.
17. The obelisk, a memorial stone and a stele in honor of the implementation in 1900 by inventor A.S. Popov of the first practical radio communication session, Hogland
18. Memorial stone in honor of the invention of the radio in 1895 by A. S. Popov, Kronshtadt, Toulonskaya Alley, Yachtennaya Square
19. Sign 100 years of radio (1997), Sevastopol
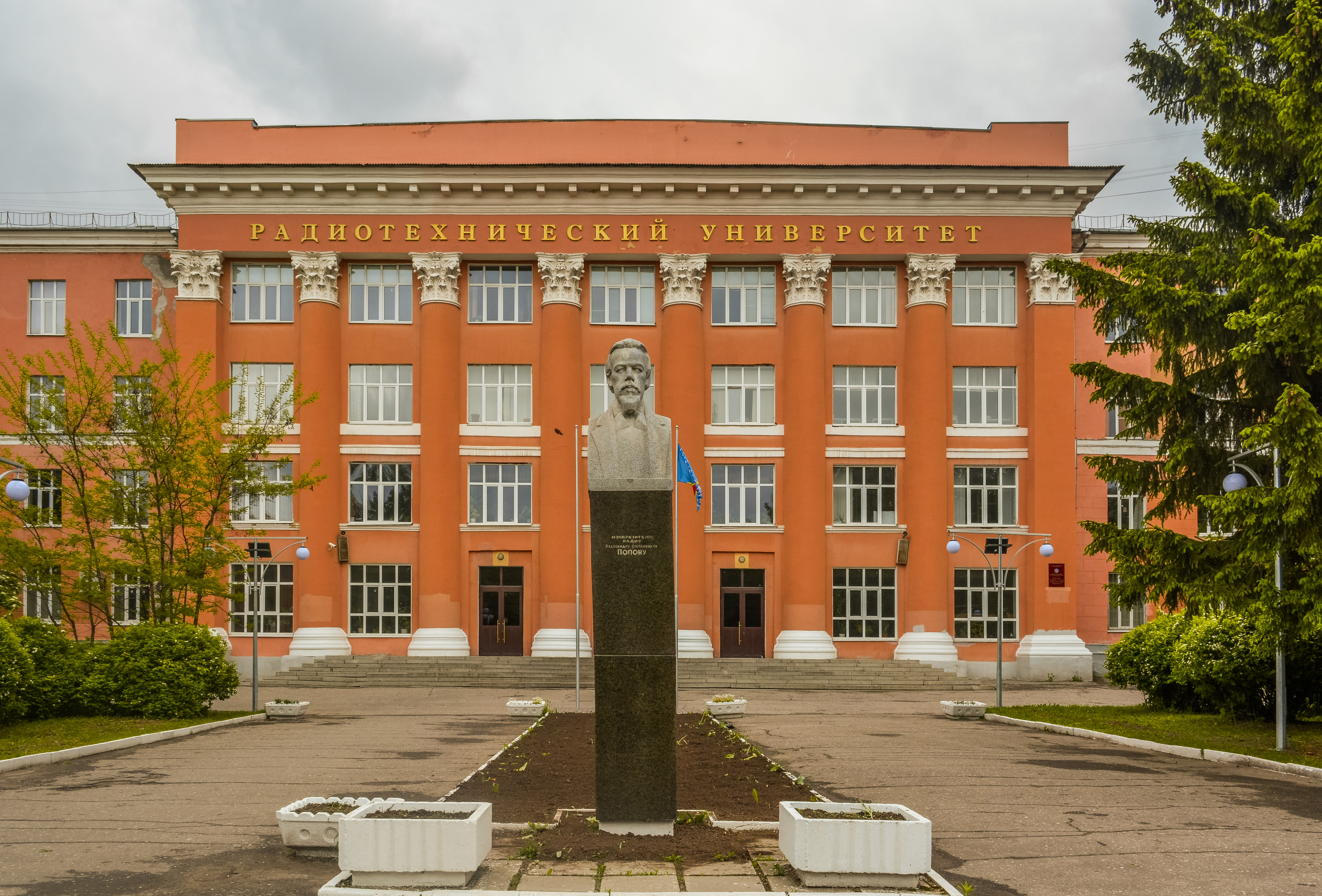
Bust of Popov at the entrance to Ryazan State Radio Engineering University

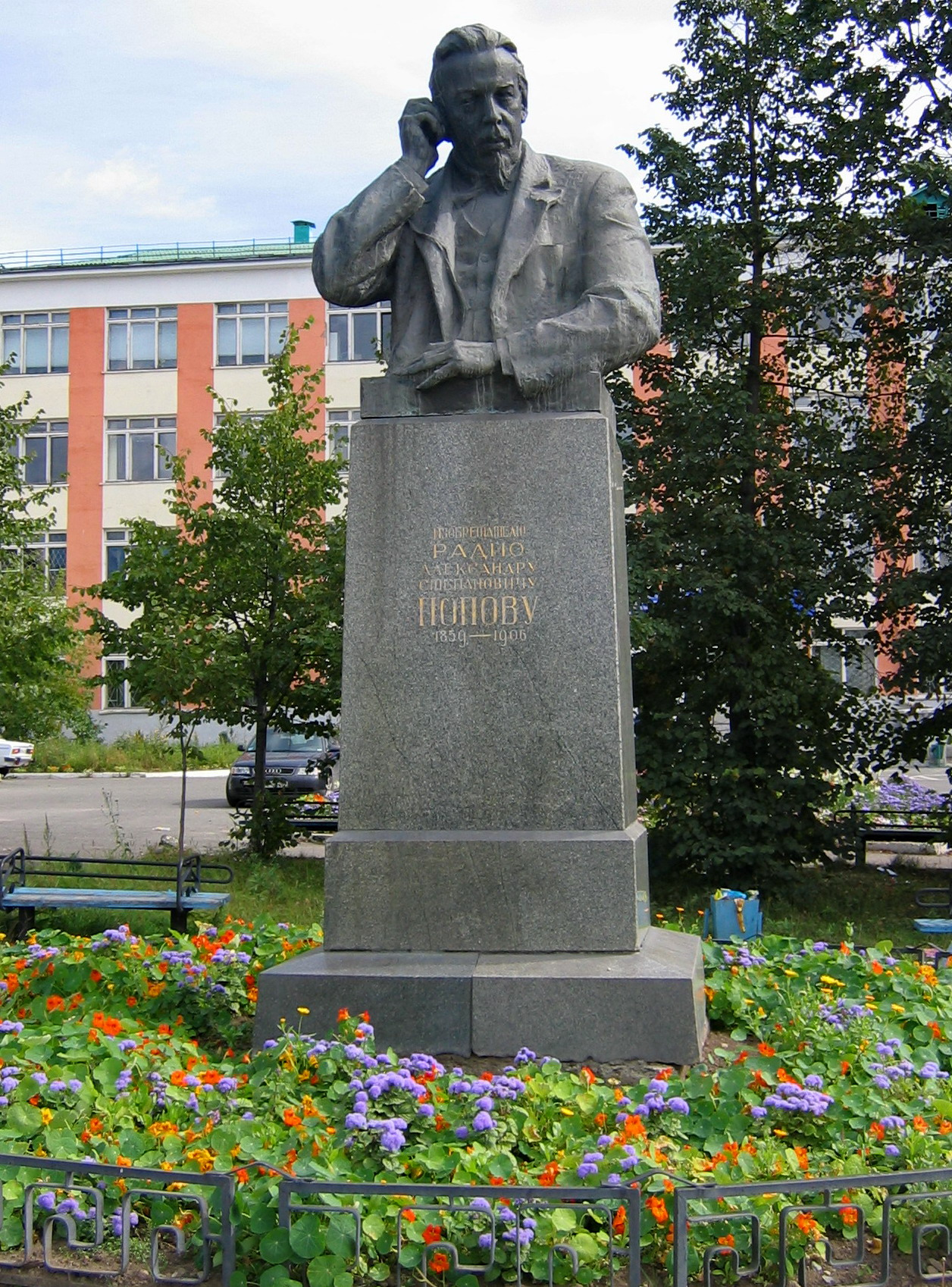
Monument to A.S.Popov in Krasnoturinsk

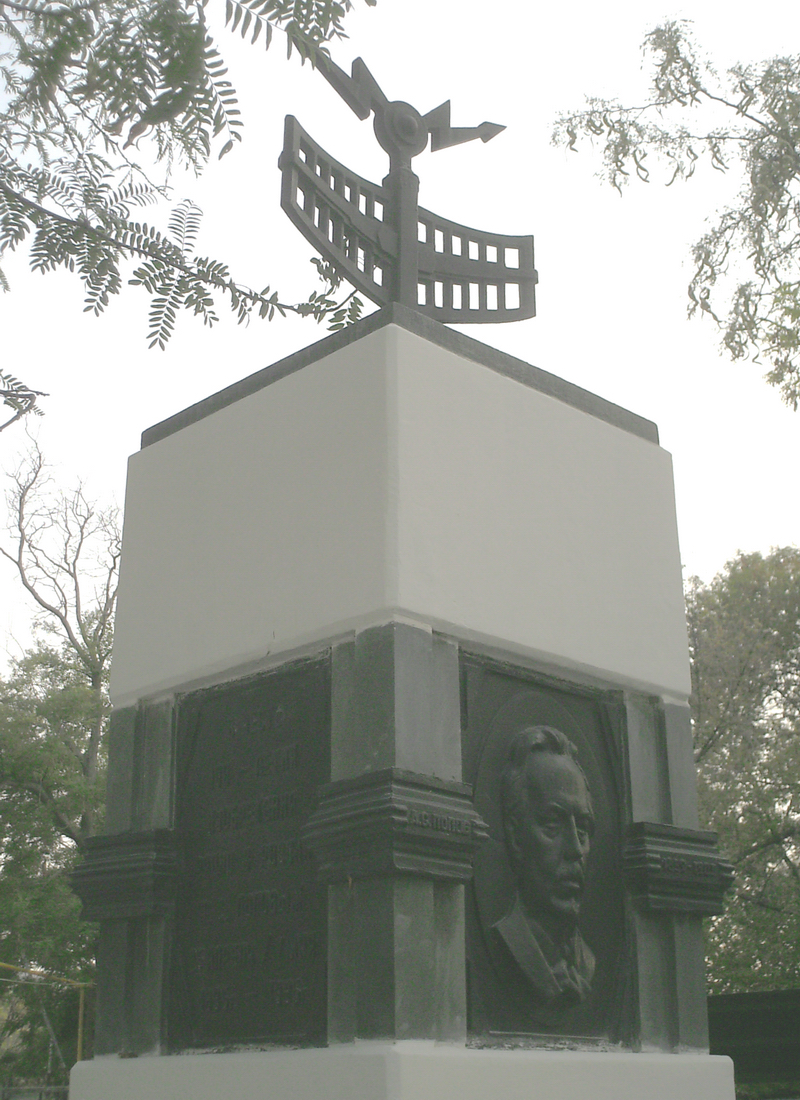
100 years sign of radio in Sevastopol

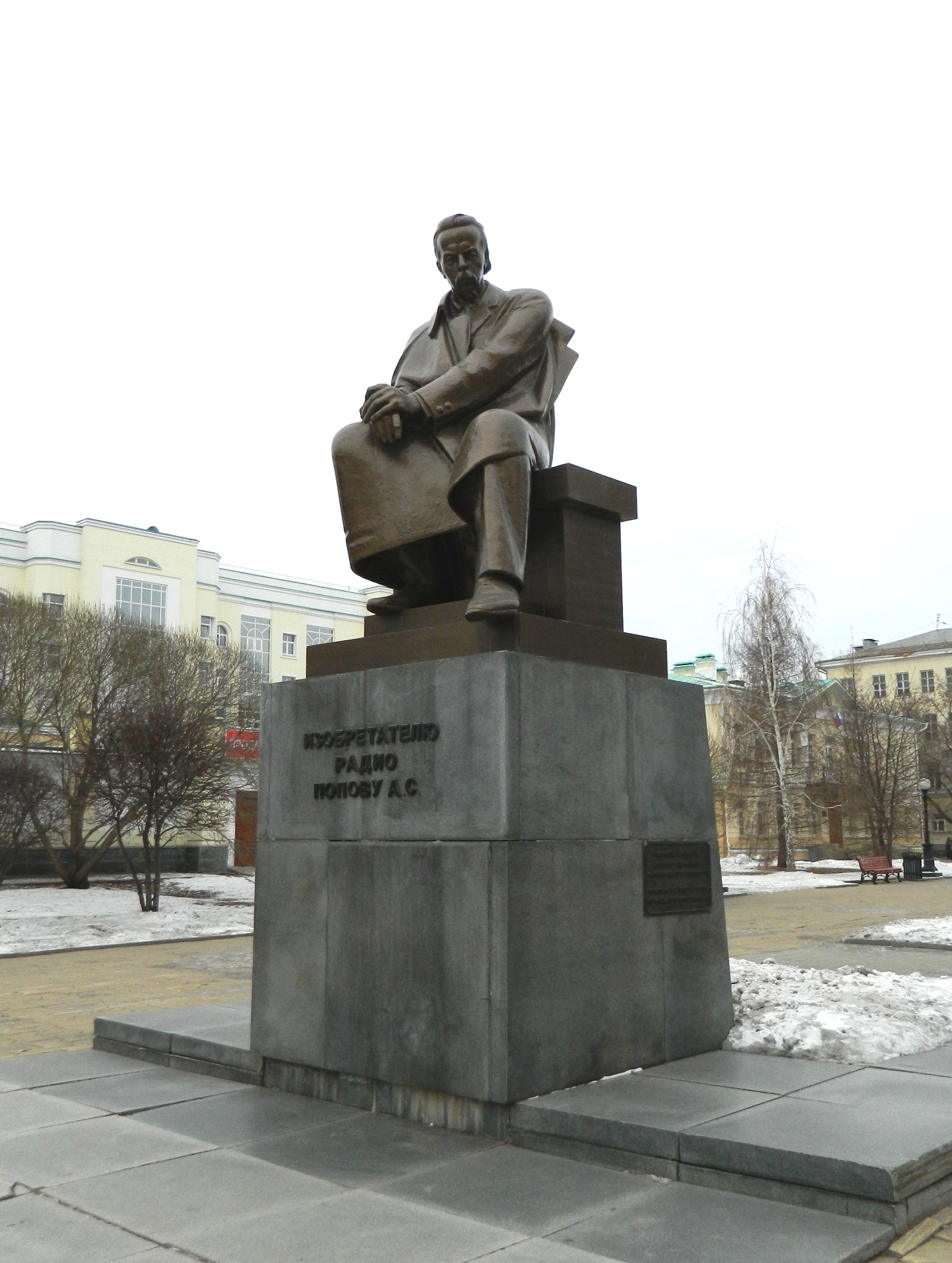
Monument to Popov in Yekaterinburg city

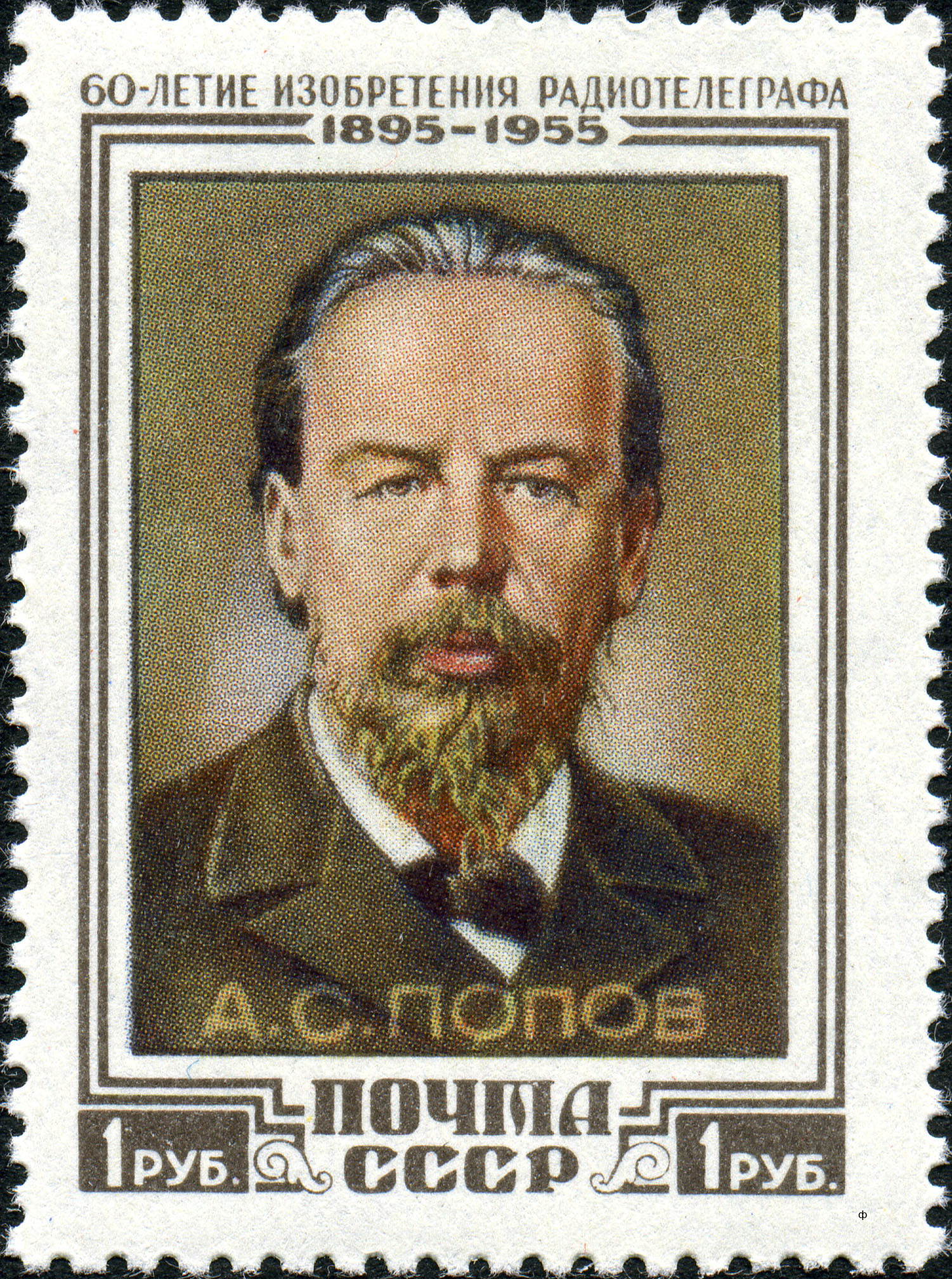
1955 postage stamp

=== Commemorative plaques ===
1. In Kronstadt, Sovetskaya St., at the house 43 a memorial plaque states: "Here, in the naval assembly, in 1886–1898 the inventor of the radio A. S. Popov gave public lectures", 1995. Sculptor Sidorenko V. G. Marble, bronze.
2. In Kronstadt, Makarovskaya St., there is a memorial plaque on the house states: "Here, in the former marine technical school, in 1890–1901, radio inventor A. S. Popov worked as a teacher", 1995. Sculptor Sidorenko V. G. Marble, bronze.
3. In Kronstadt, Makarovskaya St., there is a memorial plaque on the house: "Here, in the former mine officer class, the inventor of the radio A. S. Popov worked. 1883–1901", 1945. Marble.
4. In Kronstadt, 1 Makarovskaya St., a gazebo in the courtyard, memorial plaque: "Here, in April–May 1895, the inventor of the radio A. S. Popov tested the world's first radio receiver", 1945. Marble.
5. In Kronstadt, Uritsky St., on the house 35 a plaque: "I, the great Russian scientist, inventor of radio Alexander Stepanovich Popov, lived here in 1895–1901.", 1945. Marble.
6. In Kronstadt, Ammerman St., on the house 31 a plaque: "The great Russian scientist, inventor of radio Alexander Stepanovich Popovlived here from 1886 to 1898", 1974. Marble.
7. In Saint Petersburg, Admiralteysky passage, 2. In the building of the Higher Naval Engineering School. F. E. Dzerzhinsky memorial plaque states: "The great Russian scientist, radio inventor A. S. Popov taught at the Marine Engineering School from 1890 to 1900." Until 1977. Marble, bronze.
8. In Saint Petersburg, Makarova Embankment (formerly Tuchkova Embankment) at building 22, in which A.S. Popov lived in 1901–1902, a memorial plaque was installed. Marble.
9. In Saint Petersburg, Professor Popov Str., On the house 3 there is a plaque: "Inventor of the radio A. S. Popov lived, worked and died on December 31, 1905", 1925 – originally installed, 1945 – renewed. Marble.
10. In Saint Petersburg, Professor Popov St., 5/3. Electrotechnical University, memorial plaque: "In this room in 1903–1905 Alexander Stepanovich Popov was a lecturer", 1959. Arch. Ivanov A.I., Gellerstein R.I. Marble
11. In Saint Petersburg, Professor Popov St., 5/3. University of Electrical Engineering, memorial plaque: "Office of the inventor of radio, Professor A. S. Popov. 1901–1905.", 1948. Marble.
12. In Saint Petersburg, Professor Popov St., 5/3. Electrotechnical University, memorial plaque: "In 1905 Radio inventor Professor Alexander Stepanovich Popov was the first elected director of this institute" 1947. Arch. Smirnov N.I. Marble.
13. In Saint Petersburg, V.I., Szedovskaya line, on house 31/22, a plaque: "In this house in 1901–1902 lived the inventor of the radio A. S. Popov", 1947. Smirnov N. I. Marble.
14. In Saint Petersburg, Pochtamtskaya St., 7. Central Museum of Communications named. A. S. Popov, lobby, memorial plaque: "In 1945 the Central Museum of Communications was named after A. S. Popov", marble.
15. In Saint Petersburg, V.I., in the courtyard of Saint Petersburg State University on the building of the Russian Physics-chemical Society, Universitetskaya emb., memorial plaque: "Here on March 24 (12), 1896 A.S. Popov received the very first radiogram using the device he invented", 1961. Marble.
16. With the support of the International Telecommunication Union (ITU) in Geneva from 5 to 9 October 2009, the World Exhibition "Telecommunication World 2009" was held (ITU Telecom World 2009). Among the events was the opening of a plaque to A. S. Popov at the world communications management center.

=== Museums ===
1. Museum of Radio named after A. S. Popova, Ekaterinburg
2. House-Museum of Alexander Stepanovich Popov, Krasnoturyinsk
3. Memorial Museum of Radio Inventor A.S. Popov, Kronstadt
4. Museum-cabinet and museum-apartment of A. S. Popov, LETI, St. Petersburg
5. The postal and telecommunications museum in Saint Petersburg, the leading museum in its field in the Russian Federation, has since 1945 bore the name A.S. Popov Central Museum of Communications.
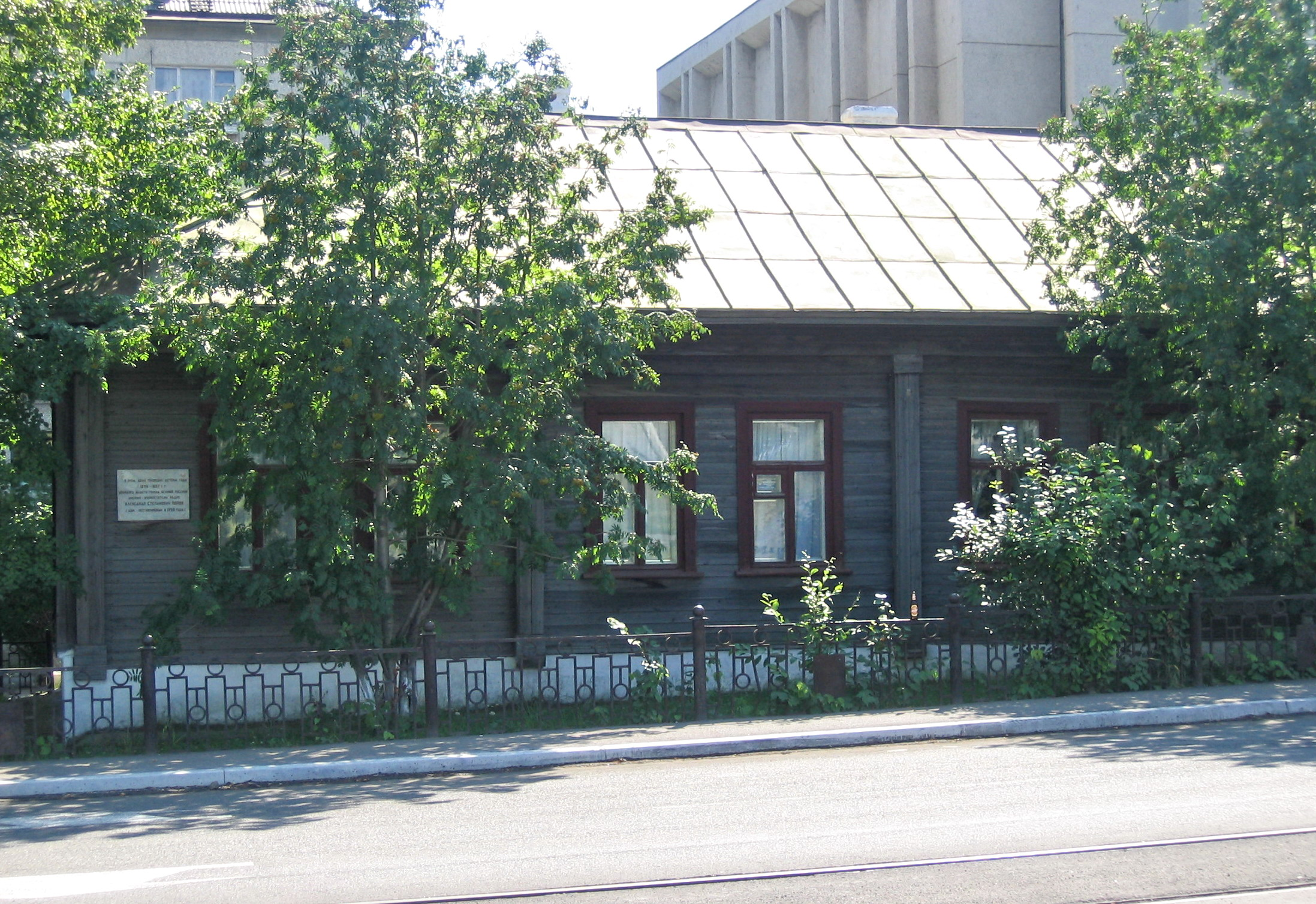
House-Museum of Alexander Stepanovich Popov, Krasnoturyinsk in Popov street

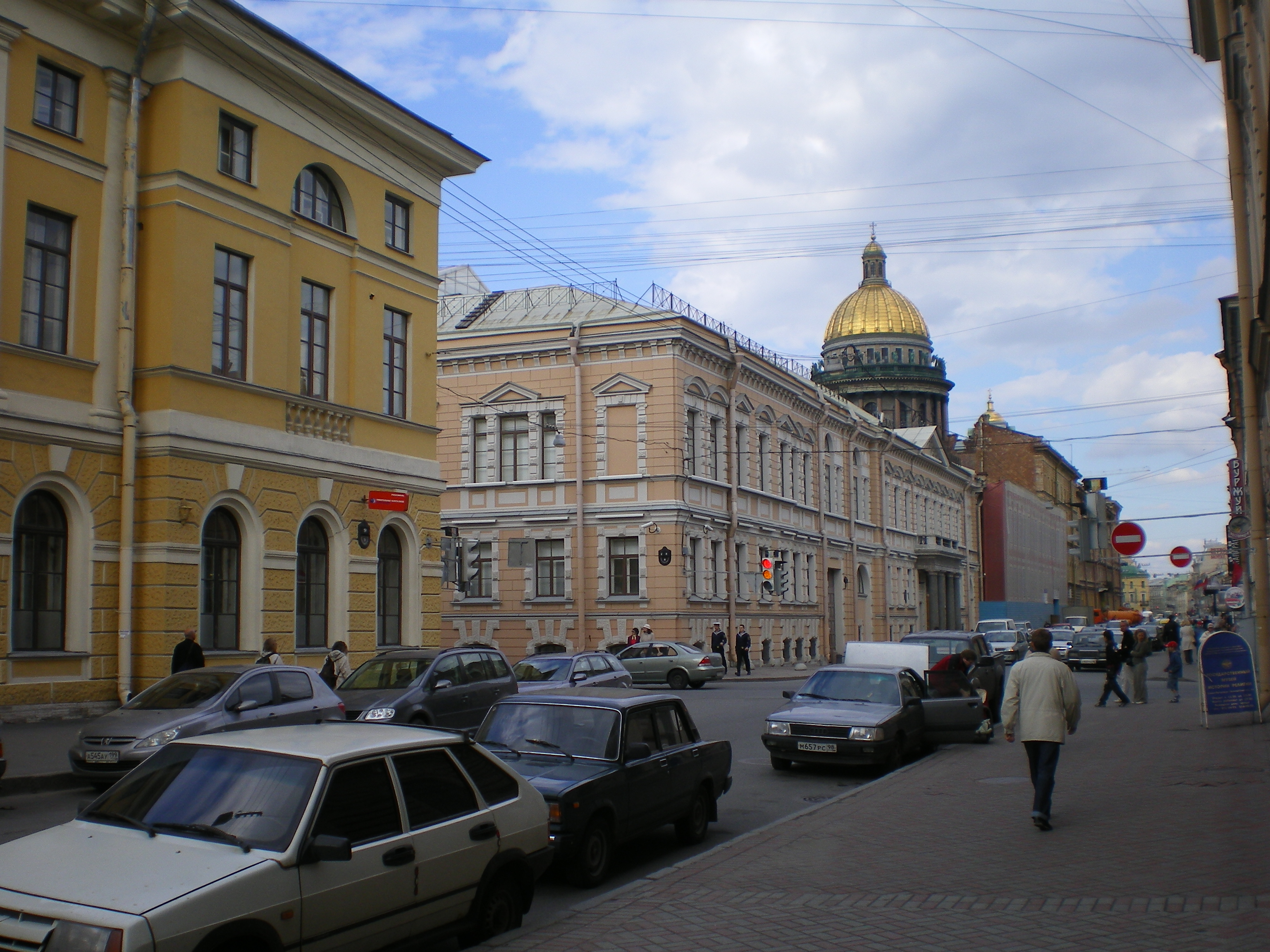
A.S. Popov Central Museum of Communications in Saint Petersburg

=== Books ===
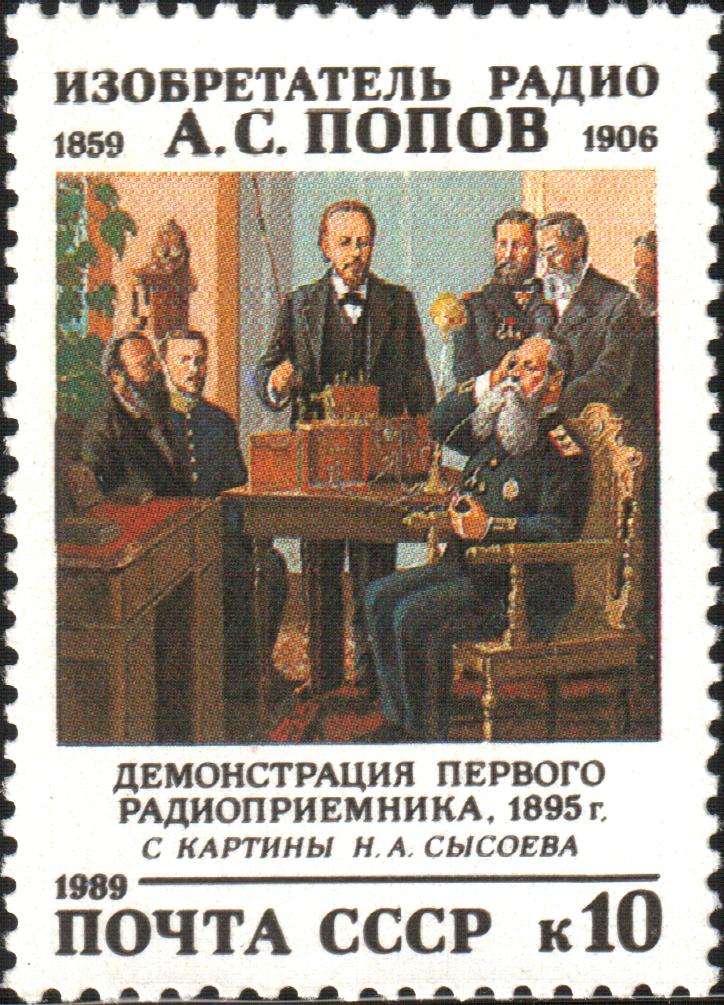
Radio pioneer Alexander Popov on the 1989 USSR stamp. The text says "Inventor of radio, A. S. Popov, 1859–1906. Demonstration of the first radio, 1895"

Books about A. S. Popov:

Golovin G.I. ("The life of wonderful people" Series, No. 141): Alexander Stepanovich Popov – 1945, 88 pp., 50

=== Movies ===
Films about A. S. Popov:

Alexander Popov (film) is a 1949 biographical film about the life and work of Alexander Stepanovich Popov.

=== Holidays ===
16 March is the birthday of A. S. Popov 7 May – Radio Day

=== Numismatics ===
In 1984, the USSR State Bank issued a jubilee coin with a face value of 1 ruble dedicated to A.S. Popov.

=== Philately ===
Many stamps have been issued depict A.S.Popov bearing the honor of him inventing radio.

== Family ==
Some of his descendants escaped to Manchuria during the Bolshevik Revolution and eventually made their way to the United States. Among others were his cousin, Paul Popov, who became a prominent physician in San Francisco and Paul's son, Egor Popov (1913–2001), who became a UC Berkeley Professor Emeritus of Civil and Environmental Engineering.

== See also ==
- All-Russia Exhibition 1896
- Invention of radio
- Radio Day
