= Popov (crater) =

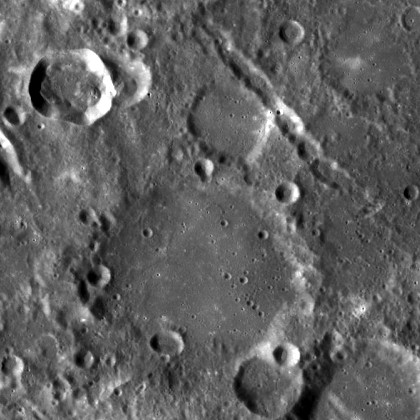
- LRO image
- Coordinates: 17.2°N 99.7°E
- Diameter: 71.4 km
- Depth: unknown
- Colongitude: 261° at sunrise
- Eponym: Aleksander S. Popov, Cyril Popov

Popov is a crater on the far side of the Moon, just beyond the eastern limb. It measures approximately 71.4 kilometers (44.4 miles) in diameter and is located along the very edge of the area of surface that is sometimes brought into view of the Earth during periods of favorable libration and illumination. However even at such times it is not prominent and can only be viewed edge-on.

== Description ==
This crater lies due south of Dziewulski, and the crater chain designated Catena Dziewulski passes just to the northeast of Popov's outer rim. Just to the southeast of Popov lies Möbius, and the two are joined together by a smaller crater that lies along the south-southeast rim of Popov. To the southwest lies the crater Ginzel and Mare Marginis.

Popov is a worn crater with a damaged outer rim that is little more than a circular, jumbled series of ridges in the surface. Several small craters lie along the rim and inner wall, particularly along the western side. The interior floor is otherwise relatively level and nearly without any features.

It is named after Russian physicist Alexander Stepanovich Popov, who is considered to be the inventor of radio in his homeland and eastern European countries. A small and currently unnamed crater to the south of Popov was originally proposed to be named Popov in 1961, but the larger crater was ultimately assigned the name.

== Satellite craters ==
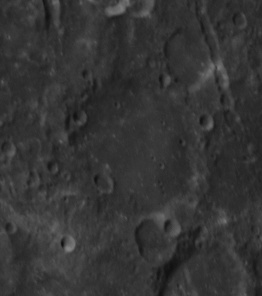
Oblique Apollo 14 image

By convention these features are identified on lunar maps by placing the letter on the side of the crater midpoint that is closest to Popov.

Satellite	Latitude	Longitude	Diameter	Ref
D	17.8° N	102.6° E	17.48 km	WGPSN
W	19.1° N	97.8° E	26.3 km	WGPSN

== See also ==
- 3074 Popov, asteroid
