= 3074 Popov =

Main-belt asteroid

Discovery
- Discovered by: L. Zhuravleva
- Discovery site: Crimean Astrophysical Obs.
- Discovery date: 24 December 1979

Designations
- Named after: Alexander Stepanovich Popov (Russian inventor of radio)
- Alternative designations: 1979 YE_{9} · 1964 TZ; 1975 XK_{1} · 1978 RF_{14}
- Minor planet category: main-belt · (inner) · Nysa–Polana complex

Orbital characteristics
- Epoch 23 March 2018 (JD 2458200.5)
- Uncertainty parameter 0
- Observation arc: 52.74 yr (19,262 d)
- Aphelion: 2.5981 AU
- Perihelion: 2.0800 AU
- Semi-major axis: 2.3391 AU
- Eccentricity: 0.1107
- Orbital period (sidereal): 3.58 yr (1,307 d)
- Mean anomaly: 228.45°
- Mean motion: 0° 16^{m} 31.8^{s} / day
- Inclination: 2.4157°
- Longitude of ascending node: 348.70°
- Argument of perihelion: 151.19°

Physical characteristics
- Mean diameter: 9.875±0.064 km
- Geometric albedo: 0.070±0.008
- Spectral type: SMASS = B
- Absolute magnitude (H): 13.7

3074 Popov, provisional designation 1979 YE_{9}, is a carbonaceous asteroid from the inner regions of the asteroid belt, approximately 10 kilometers (6 miles) in diameter. It was discovered on 24 December 1979, by Soviet–Russian astronomer Lyudmila Zhuravleva at the Crimean Astrophysical Observatory in Nauchnyj on the Crimean peninsula. The B-type asteroid has an unknown rotation period. It was named after Russian physicist Alexander Stepanovich Popov, an early radio pioneer in Russia.

== Orbit and classification ==
Popov is a member of the carbonaceous subgroup of the Nysa–Polana complex, a collection of overlapping asteroid families in the inner main-belt not far from the Kirkwood gap at 2.5 AU, a depleted zone where a 3:1 orbital resonance with Jupiter exists.

It orbits the Sun in the inner asteroid belt at a distance of 2.1–2.6 AU once every 3 years and 7 months (1,307 days; semi-major axis of 2.34 AU). Its orbit has an eccentricity of 0.11 and an inclination of 2° with respect to the ecliptic.

The asteroid was first observed as 1964 TZ at the Purple Mountain Observatory in October 1964. The body's observation arc begins with its observations as 1975 XK_{1} at Crimea–Nauchnij in December 1975, or four years prior to its official discovery observation.

== Physical characteristics ==
In the SMASS classification, Popov is a B-type asteroid, which have a "brighter" surface than the common carbonaceous C-types.

=== Diameter and albedo ===
According to the survey carried out by the NEOWISE mission of NASA's Wide-field Infrared Survey Explorer, Popov measures 9.875 kilometers in diameter and its surface has an albedo of 0.070.

=== Rotation period ===
As of 2018, no rotational lightcurve of Popov has been obtained from photometric observations. The body's rotation period, shape and poles remain unknown.

== Naming ==
This minor planet was named after Russian physicist Alexander Stepanovich Popov (1859–1906), who is considered to be the inventor of radio in his homeland and in eastern European countries. The official naming citation was published by the Minor Planet Center on 31 May 1988 (M.P.C. 13174). The lunar crater Popov was also named in his honor.
