= Morbius (disambiguation) =

Morbius is a Marvel comic book character.

Morbius may also refer to:

- "Morbius", a 1995 episode of Spider-Man: The Animated Series, "Chapter VI" of Neogenic Nightmare
- Morbius (film), a 2022 American superhero film based on the Marvel Comics character
  - Morbius (soundtrack), the soundtrack of the 2022 film
  - Milo Morbius, a character in the film Morbius
- The Brain of Morbius, a Doctor Who serial
  - Morbius (Doctor Who villain), a character in the Doctor Who serial
- Edward Morbius, a character in the 1956 science fiction film Forbidden Planet

== See also ==
- Moebius (disambiguation)
