= Möbius (crater) =

Crater on the Moon

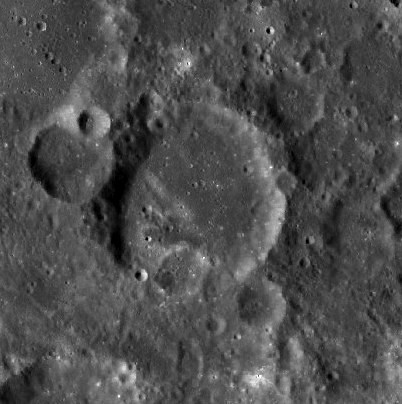
- LRO image
- Coordinates: 15.8°N 101.2°E
- Diameter: 50 km
- Depth: Unknown
- Colongitude: 259° at sunrise
- Eponym: August F. Möbius

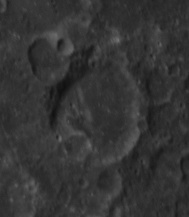
Oblique Apollo 14 Hasselblad camera image

Möbius is a lunar impact crater that is located on the Moon's far side, beyond the eastern limb and northeast of the Mare Marginis. It lies less than one crater diameter to the northwest of the larger, 90-km-diameter Hertz, and just to the southeast of Popov. To the north of Mobius is the crater chain designated Catena Dziewulski, which takes its name from the crater Dziewulski to the north-northwest.

This is a moderately worn crater formation, with a smaller crater intruding into the western rim and a small crater cutting across the rim at the southern end. The rim is relatively low and the interior is marked only by a few tiny craterlets and some higher-albedo markings in the southwestern quadrant.

Prior to naming in 1970 by the IAU, this crater was known as Crater 196.
