= Władysław Dziewulski =

Polish astronomer and mathematician (1878–1982)

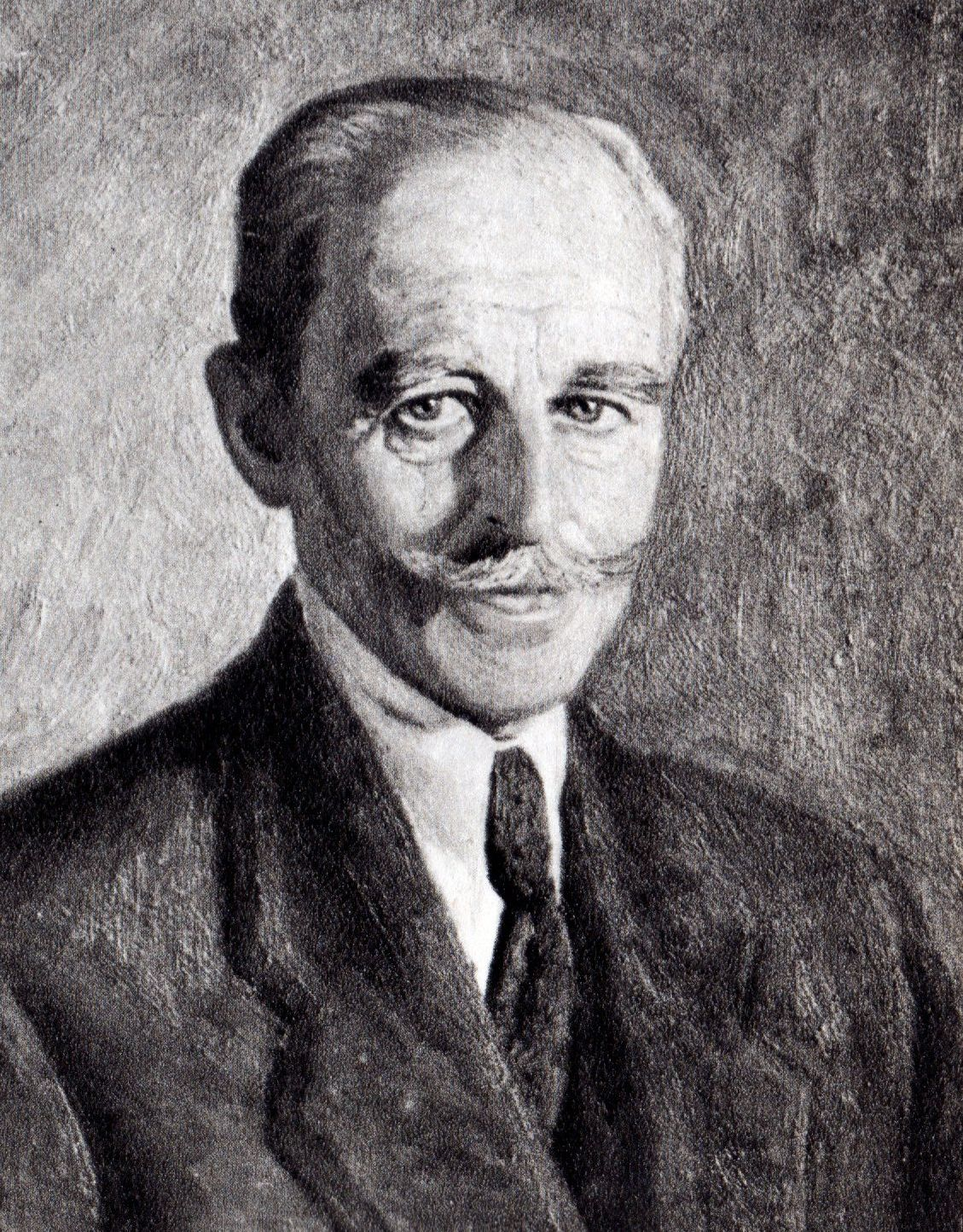
- Portrait published in 1973
- Born: 2 September 1878; Warsaw, Congress Poland
- Died: 6 February 1982 (aged 83); Toruń, Poland
- Occupations: Astronomer, mathematician
- Known for: Rector of Batory University

Władysław Dziewulski (2 September 1878 – 6 February 1982) was a Polish astronomer and mathematician. He spent most his life performing astronomical research, and published over 200 papers.

== Life ==
He studied mathematics and astronomy in his native Warsaw. Then in 1902 he went to the University of Göttingen in Germany to complete his education. In 1903, he was named as an assistant at the astronomical observatory in Kraków that belonged to the Jagiellonian University and in 1906, he gained his PhD there. In 1919, he became a professor of the Batory University in Vilna and director of its Astronomical Observatory. He was also the rector of Batory University in 1924–25. Later he moved to Nicolaus Copernicus University in Toruń. He spent the last part of his life in Toruń.

He focused on the gravitational perturbations of minor planets, movements of stellar groupings, and photographic photometry.

The crater Dziewulski on the Moon, the Wladyslaw Dziewulski Planetarium in Toruń, and the main-belt asteroid 319636 Dziewulski are all named in his honor.
