= Maria Dziewulska =

Polish composer

Maria Amelia Dziewulska (1 June 1909 – 18 April 2006) was a Polish composer, music theoretician and music educator. She was born in Warsaw and studied music theory at the State Conservatoire in Warsaw from 1928 to 1933 with Kazimierz Sikorski. She studied special effects for radio, film and recording in London and worked as a music arranger for the BBC and Decca from 1936 to 1937. She then took a position as professor of Music Theory at the Academy of Music in Warsaw, later becoming dean. She died in Warsaw in 2006.

== Works ==
Dziewulska composed in traditional style. Selected works include:

- Ave Maria
- Inwencje
- String Quartet
- Folk songs arranged for children's chorus
- Duetti per Flauti (1970)

She published material for music study including:

- Everything for Mixed Choir
- Materials for Aural Training
- Inventions (1959)
