= Jerzy Dziewulski =

Polish politician (1943–2025)

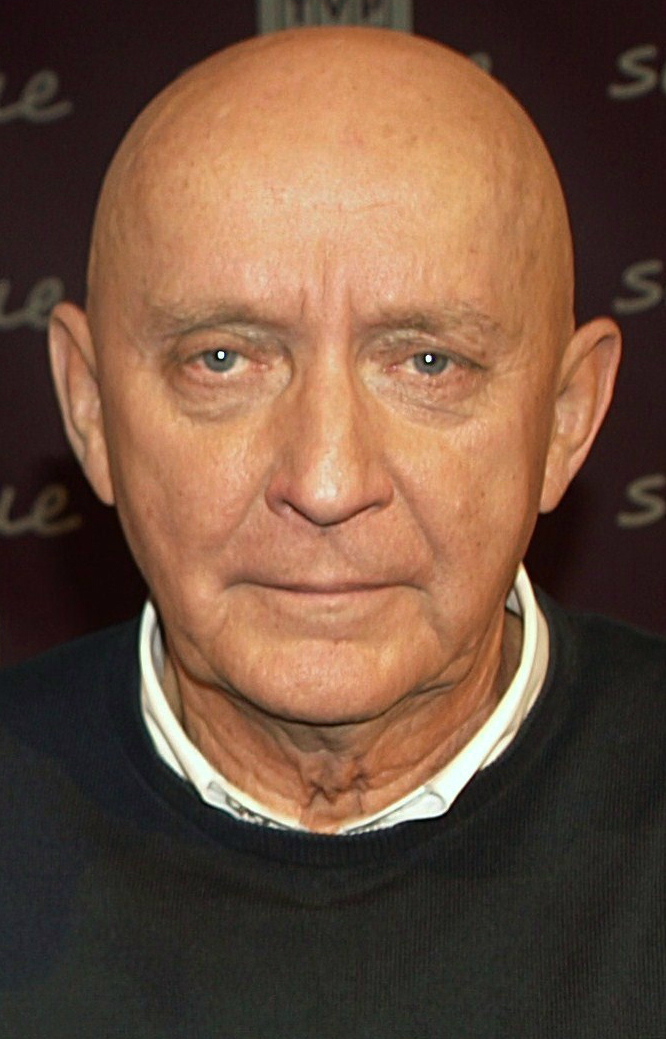
Jerzy Dziewulski

Jerzy Dziewulski (15 December 1943 – 11 August 2025) was a Polish politician.

== Life and career ==
Dziewulski was born in Warsaw on 15 December 1943. After completing his military service, he took up professional service in the Citizens' Militia. In 1966, he started working at the Warsaw Citizens' Militia Headquarters (later known as the Warsaw Police Headquarters).

On 14 March 1980, he was one of the first people to undertake a reconnaissance and rescue operation at the site of the "Nicolaus Copernicus" plane crash. On 9 May 1987, he conducted similar activities after a plane crash in the Kabacki Forest.

He was a member of the Polish United Workers' Party. In 1991, he was elected to the Sejm as a candidate of the Polish Beer-Lovers' Party. In 1993, 1997 and 2001, he was re-elected on behalf of the Democratic Left Alliance.

From 1996 until 1997, he was an aide to President Aleksander Kwaśniewski, advising him on security matters.

Dziewulski was awarded the Officer's Cross of the Order of Restitution and the Knight's Cross of the Order of Restitution. He died on 11 August 2025, at the age of 81.
