= Radio Day =

National holiday in Russia on 7 May

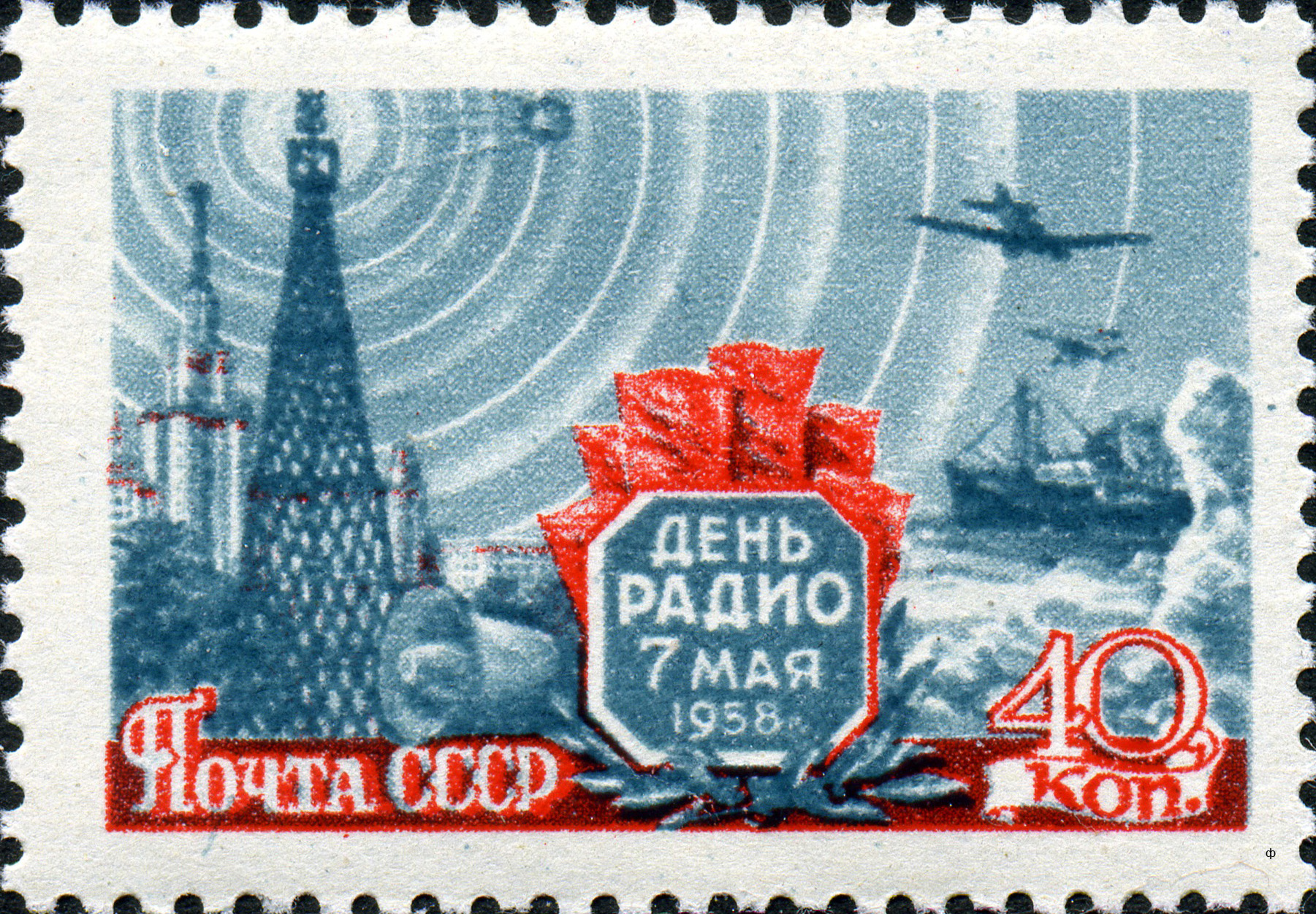
- Radio Day
- Also called: Communications Workers' Day (in Russia), Radio and Television Day (Ден на радиото и телевизията, in Bulgaria)
- Observed by: Soviet Union, Russia, Bulgaria
- Date: 7 May
- Next time: 7 May 2027
- Frequency: annual

Radio Day (Russian: День радио, Den' Radio), Communications Workers' Day (as it is officially known in Russia) or Radio and Television Day (Bulgarian: Ден на радиото и телевизията, as it is known in Bulgaria) is a commemoration of the development of radio in Russia. It takes place on 7 May, the day in 1895 on which Alexander Stepanovich Popov demonstrated a radio based lightning detector.

== Origins ==
On 7 May 1895, Alexander Stepanovich Popov presented the paper "On the Relation of Metallic Powders to Electric Oscillations" before the Russian Physical and Chemical Society in St. Petersburg, which described his radio wave based device that used Sir Oliver Lodge's coherer as a lightning detector. Popov's device was just a radio receiver, he would not develop a radio transmitter until over a year later (a year and a half after Guglielmo Marconi developed a similar device).

Popov's presentation was declared the "inventor of radio" in the former Soviet Union and Eastern Europe (although historians note it may be more due to Cold War era politics than historical evidence). The first Radio Day was observed in the Soviet Union in 1945, on the 50th anniversary of Popov's experiment, and some four decades after his death. Radio Day is officially marked in Russia and Bulgaria.

== See also ==
- Telecommunications in Russia
- World Radio Day
