= Dziewulski (crater) =

Lunar impact crater

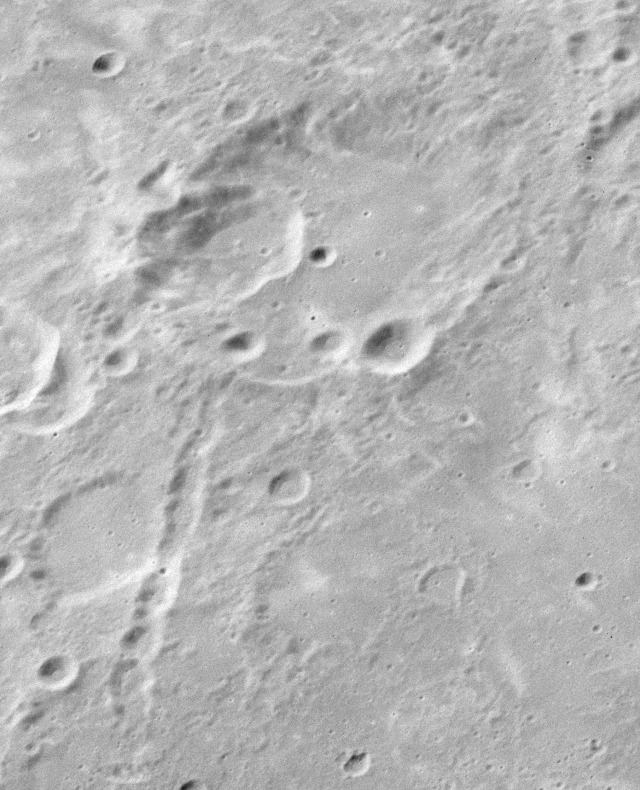
- Oblique Apollo 16 mapping camera image Dziewulski crater is at top, Catena Dziewulski is linear feature at lower left
- Coordinates: 21.2°N 98.9°E
- Diameter: 68.90 km (42.81 mi)
- Depth: Unknown
- Colongitude: 262° at sunrise
- Eponym: Władysław Dziewulski

Dziewulski is a lunar impact crater on the far side of the Moon. It lies between the craters Edison to the north and Popov to the south. The outer rim of this crater has been considerably worn by impacts, particularly along the southwest quadrant where the satellite crater Dziewulski Q overlies the rim and the interior floor. The northern rim is also heavily disrupted, and several small crater lie along the southeast rim. The interior floor and surrounding terrain has been resurfaced.

Beginning at the southern edge, a chain of craters forms a linear formation running to the southeast past Popov. Named Catena Dziewulski, this feature it is 70 km long and radial to the center of the Mare Orientale impact basin.

This formation is named after Polish astronomer Władysław Dziewulski (1878-1962). Its designation was formally adopted by the International Astronomical Union in 1970.

== Satellite craters ==
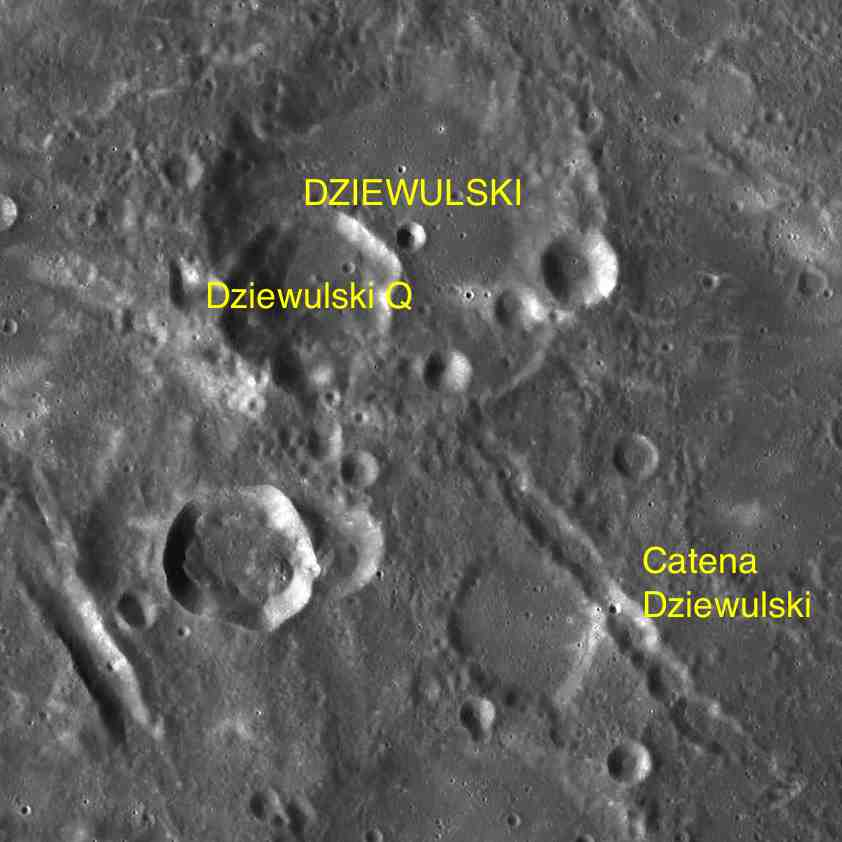
Satellite features

By convention these features are identified on lunar maps by placing the letter on the side of the crater midpoint that is closest to Dziewulski.

Dziewulski	Latitude	Longitude	Diameter
Q	20.5° N	98.2° E	32 km
