= List of communications ministers of Russia =

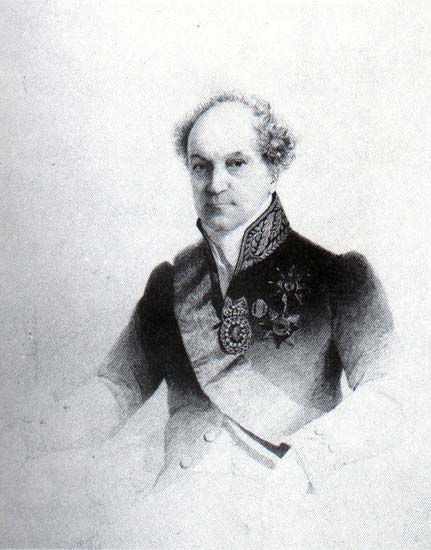
Prince Alexander Golitsyn, who held the post of Chief of the Postal Department of the Russian Empire in the first half of the 19th century

This list of ministers of communications of Russia contains the names of the people who held this position in the Russian Empire, the Russian Soviet Federative Socialist Republic, the Soviet Union and the modern Russian Federation.

== Russian Empire ==
=== Postal Department of the Ministry of Internal Affairs ===
The Postal Department of the Ministry of the Interior of the Russian Empire was formed by the Highest registered decree on November 9, 1819.

Name	Date of taking office	Date of removal from office
Alexander Golitsyn (1773–1844)	November 9, 1819	October 22, 1830

In 1830, it was transformed into the Postal Department of the Russian Empire.

=== Postal Department of the Russian Empire ===
It was formed as a ministry in 1830 with separation from the Ministry of the Interior.

Name	Date of taking office	Date of removal from office
Alexander Golitsyn (1773–1844)	October 22, 1830	March 27, 1842
Vladimir Adlerberg (1791–1884)	March 27, 1842	January 1, 1857
Fedor Pryanishnikov (1793–1867)	January 1, 1857	January 1, 1863
Ivan Tolstoy (1806–1867)	January 1, 1863	June 15, 1865

On June 15, 1865, it was transformed into the Ministry of Posts and Telegraphs of the Russian Empire.

=== Ministry of Posts and Telegraphs ===
It was established on June 15, 1865, by combining the Postal Department and the Telegraph Unit separated from the Ministry of the Interior (Personal Decree of June 15, 1865).

Name	Date of taking office	Date of removal from office
Ivan Tolstoy (1806–1867)	June 25, 1865	September 21, 1867
Alexander Timashev (1818–1893)	December 14, 1867	March 9, 1868

On March 9, 1868, it was abolished, the Postal and Telegraph Departments were created as part of the Ministry of the Interior.

=== Postal and Telegraph Departments of the Ministry of Internal Affairs ===
Formed on March 9, 1868, instead of the Ministry of Posts and Telegraphs. Both departments were headed by Ivan Velio, then Gubaidulla Chingizkhan, who was also the director of the Department of Railways of the Ministry of Internal Affairs of the Russian Empire.

Name	Date of taking office	Date of removal from office
Ivan Velio (1830–1899)	June 21, 1868	August 6, 1880
Gubaidullah Chingizkhan (1840–1909)	August 1, 1876	August 6, 1880

On August 6, 1880, they were transferred to the reconstituted Ministry of Posts and Telegraphs.

=== Ministry of Posts and Telegraphs ===
It was re-established on August 6, 1880, from the Department of Posts and Telegraphs of the Ministry of the Interior.

Name	Date of taking office	Date of removal from office
Leo Makov (1830–1883)	August 6, 1880	March 16, 1881

On March 16, 1881, it was again divided into the Postal and Telegraph Departments, which became part of the Ministry of the Interior.

=== Telegraph Department of the Ministry of Internal Affairs ===
It was founded on March 16, 1881.

Name	Date of taking office	Date of removal from office
Karl Lueders (1815–1882)	March 16, 1881	1882
Nikolay Bezak (1836–1897)	August 31, 1882	May 22, 1884

On May 22, 1884, it was merged with the Postal Department of the Ministry of the Interior into the Main Directorate of Posts and Telegraphs of the Ministry of the Interior.

=== Postal Department of the Ministry of Internal Affairs ===
It was founded on March 16, 1881.

Name	Date of taking office	Date of removal from office
Stepan Perfiliev (1849–1919)	March 16, 1881	March 1, 1882
Peter Morozov (18**–19**)	1883	May 22, 1884

On May 22, 1884, it was merged with the Telegraph Department of the Ministry of the Interior into the Main Directorate of Posts and Telegraphs of the Ministry of the Interior.

=== Main Directorate of Posts and Telegraphs of the Ministry of Internal Affairs ===
It was established on May 22, 1884, at the merger of the Postal and Telegraph Departments of the Ministry of the Interior.

Name	Date of taking office	Date of removal from office
Nikolay Bezak (1836–1897)	May 22, 1884	July 22, 1895
Nikolay Petrov (1841–1905)	July 31, 1895	January 3, 1903
Evgeny Andreevsky (1847–1917)	January 3, 1903	December 1903
Peter Durnovo (1845–1915)	September 16, 1904	December 5, 1904
Mikhail Sevastyanov (1848–1925)	December 5, 1904	October 1, 1913
Vladimir Pokhvisnev (1858–1925)	October 1, 1913	February 28, 1917

== Provisional Government ==
=== Ministry of Posts and Telegraphs ===
Name	Date of taking office	Date of removal from office
Irakli Tsereteli (1881–1959)	May 5, 1917	July 24, 1917
Alexey Nikitin (1876–1939)	July 24, 1917	October 25, 1917

== Russian Socialist Federative Soviet Republic ==
=== People's Commissariat of Posts and Telegraphs ===
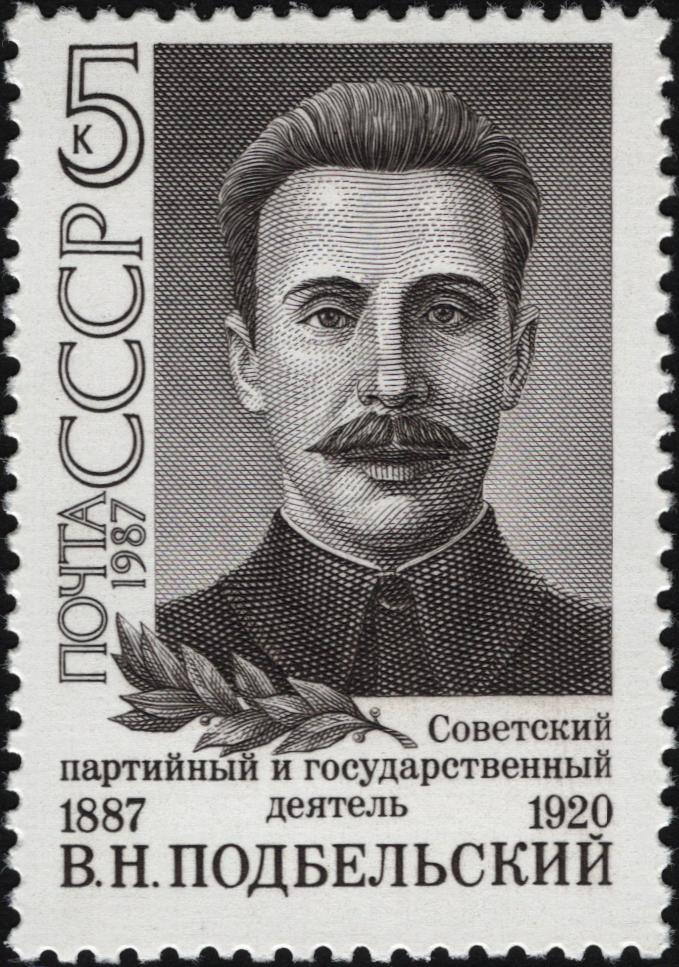
Postage Stamp of the Soviet Union (1987): Vadim Podbelsky – People's Commissar of Posts and Telegraphs of the Russian Socialist Federative Soviet Republic

Name	Date of taking office	Date of removal from office
Nikolay Avilov (1887–1937)	October 26, 1917	December 9, 1917
Prosh Proshyan (1883–1918)	December 9, 1917	March 18, 1918
Vadim Podbelsky (1887–1920)	April 11, 1918	February 25, 1920
Artemy Lyubovich (1880–1938)	March 24, 1920	May 26, 1921
Valerian Dovgalevsky (1885–1934)	May 26, 1921	July 6, 1923

=== Ministry of Communications ===
It was founded on January 3, 1955.

Name	Date of taking office	Date of removal from office
Alexey Cherenkov	January 18, 1955	April 18, 1963

It was abolished in 1963 (Decree of the Presidium of the Supreme Council of the Russian Soviet Federative Socialist Republic of April 18, 1963 "On the Abolition of the Union–Republican Ministry of Communications of the Russian Soviet Federative Socialist Republic" and the Law of the Russian Soviet Federative Socialist Republic of December 25, 1963 "On the Approval of Decrees of the Presidium Supreme Council of the Russian Soviet Federative Socialist Republic and on Amendments and Additions to Articles 47, 54 and 55 of the Constitution (Basic Law) of the Russian Soviet Federative Socialist Republic").

It was re-formed in 1979 (Decree of the Presidium of the Supreme Council of the Russian Soviet Federative Socialist Republic of July 13, 1979 "On the Establishment of the Ministry of Communications of the Russian Soviet Federative Socialist Republic" and the Law of the Russian Soviet Federative Socialist Republic of August 3, 1979 "On the Council of Ministers of the Russian Soviet Federative Socialist Republic").

Name	Date of taking office	Date of removal from office
Gleb Baytsur (b. 1927)	September 17, 1979; June 15, 1990 (acting)	June 15, 1990; July 14, 1990 (acting)

On July 14, 1990, it was transformed into the Ministry of the Russian Soviet Federative Socialist Republic for Communications, Informatics, and Space. However, no amendment was made to the Law of the Russian Soviet Federative Socialist Republic "On the Council of Ministers of the Russian Soviet Federative Socialist Republic".

=== Ministry of Communications, Informatics and Space ===
It was established on July 14, 1990, on the basis of the Ministry of Communications of the Russian Soviet Federative Socialist Republic (Law of the Russian Soviet Federative Socialist Republic "On Republican Ministries and Committees of the Russian Soviet Federative Socialist Republic" of July 14, 1990).

Name	Date of taking office	Date of removal from office
Vladimir Bulgak (b. 1941)	July 14, 1990	November 10, 1991

On November 10, 1991, the Ministry of Communications of the Russian Soviet Federative Socialist Republic was restored.

=== Ministry of Communications ===
Established on November 10, 1991, on the basis of the Ministry of the Russian Soviet Federative Socialist Republic for Communications, Informatics and Space (Decree of the President of the Russian Soviet Federative Socialist Republic of November 10, 1991, No. 181).

Name	Date of taking office	Date of removal from office
Vladimir Bulgak (b. 1941)	November 10, 1991	December 25, 1991, or May 16, 1992

On December 25, 1991, the Supreme Council of the Russian Soviet Federative Socialist Republic adopted a law on the renaming of the Russian Soviet Federative Socialist Republic into the Russian Federation. On April 21, 1992, the Congress of People's Deputies of the Russian Soviet Federative Socialist Republic approved the renaming, introducing corresponding amendments to the Constitution of the Russian Soviet Federative Socialist Republic, which entered into force on May 16, 1992.

== Soviet Union ==
=== People's Commissariat of Posts and Telegraphs ===
It was founded on July 6, 1923.

Name	Date of taking office	Date of removal from office
Ivan Smirnov (1881–1936)	July 6, 1923	November 12, 1927
Artemy Lyubovich (1880–1938)	November 12, 1927	January 16, 1928
Nikolay Antipov (1894–1938)	January 16, 1928	March 30, 1931
Alexey Rykov (1881–1938)	March 30, 1931	January 17, 1932

On January 17, 1932, it was renamed the People's Commissariat of Communications of the Soviet Union.

=== People's Commissariat of Communications ===
It was formed on January 17, 1932, by renaming the People's Commissariat of Posts and Telegraph of the Soviet Union.

Name	Date of taking office	Date of removal from office
Alexey Rykov (1881–1938)	January 17, 1932	September 26, 1936
Genrikh Yagoda (1891–1938)	September 26, 1936	April 3, 1937
Innokenty Khalepsky (1893–1938)	April 5, 1937	August 16, 1937
Matvey Berman (1898–1939)	August 16, 1937	December 24, 1938
Victor Yartsev (1904–1940)	December 24, 1938	May 10, 1939
Ivan Peresypkin (1904–1978)	May 10, 1939	July 22, 1944
Konstantin Sergeychuk (1906–1971)	July 22, 1944	March 15, 1946

On March 15, 1946, it was transformed into a ministry of the same name.

=== Ministry of Communications ===
It was founded on March 15, 1946, from the People's Commissariat of the same name.

Name	Date of taking office	Date of removal from office
Konstantin Sergeychuk (1906–1971)	March 19, 1946	March 30, 1948
Nikolay Psurtsev (1900–1980)	March 30, 1948	September 3, 1975
Nikolay Talyzin (1929–1991)	September 3, 1975	October 24, 1980
Vasily Shamshin (1926–2009)	October 24, 1980	July 11, 1989
Erlen Pervyshin (1932–2004)	July 11, 1989	December 26, 1990
Gennady Kudryavtsev (b. 1941)	March 2, 1991; August 28, 1991 (acting)	August 28, 1991; November 26, 1991 (acting)

It was liquidated on December 26, 1991, in connection with the termination of the existence of the Soviet Union.

== Russian Federation ==
=== Ministry of Communications ===
Name	Date of taking office	Date of removal from office
Vladimir Bulgak (b. 1941)	December 25, 1991	March 17, 1997

On March 17, 1997, it was transformed into the State Committee of the Russian Federation for Communications and Informatization.

=== State Committee of Communications and Informatization ===
It was established on March 17, 1997, on the basis of the Ministry of Communications of the Russian Federation (Decree of the President of the Russian Federation of March 17, 1997, No. 249).

Name	Date of taking office	Date of removal from office
Alexander Krupnov (b. 1941)	March 25, 1997	May 25, 1999

On May 25, 1999, it was transformed into the State Committee of the Russian Federation for Telecommunications.

=== State Committee of Telecommunications ===
It was formed on May 25, 1999, on the basis of the State Committee of the Russian Federation for Communications and Informatization (Decree of the President of the Russian Federation of May 25, 1999, No. 651).

Name	Date of taking office	Date of removal from office
Alexander Ivanov (b. 1940)	June 1, 1999	August 27, 1999
Leonid Reiman (b. 1957)	August 27, 1999	November 12, 1999

On November 12, 1999, it was transformed into the Ministry of the Russian Federation for Communications and Informatization.

=== Ministry of Communications and Informatization ===
It was established on November 12, 1999, on the basis of the State Committee of the Russian Federation for Telecommunications (Decree of the President of the Russian Federation of November 12, 1999, No. 1487).

Name	Date of taking office	Date of removal from office
Leonid Reiman (b. 1957)	November 12, 1999	March 9, 2004

On March 9, 2004, it was merged with the Ministry of Transport of the Russian Federation into the Ministry of Transport and Communications of the Russian Federation.

=== Ministry of Transport and Communications ===
It was established on March 9, 2004, when the Ministry of the Russian Federation for Communications and Informatization and the Ministry of Transport of the Russian Federation merged (Decree of the President of the Russian Federation of March 9, 2004, No. 314).

Name	Date of taking office	Date of removal from office
Igor Levitin (b. 1952)	March 9, 2004	May 20, 2004

On May 20, 2004, it was divided into the Ministry of Transport of the Russian Federation and the Ministry of Information Technologies and Communications of the Russian Federation.

=== Ministry of Information Technologies and Communications ===
Established on May 20, 2004, under the division of the Ministry of Transport and Communications of the Russian Federation (Decree of the President of the Russian Federation of May 20, 2004, No. 649).

Name	Date of taking office	Date of removal from office
Leonid Reiman (b. 1957)	May 20, 2004	May 12, 2008

On May 12, 2008, it was transformed into the Ministry of Communications and Mass Media of the Russian Federation.

=== Ministry of Communications and Mass Media ===
It was established on May 12, 2008, on the basis of the Ministry of Information Technologies and Communications of the Russian Federation (Decree of the President of the Russian Federation of May 12, 2008, No. 724).

Name	Date of taking office	Date of removal from office
Igor Shchegolev (b. 1965)	May 12, 2008	May 21, 2012
Nikolay Nikiforov (b. 1982)	May 21, 2012	May 15, 2018

On May 15, 2018, it was renamed the Ministry of Digital Development, Communications and Mass Media (Decree of the President of the Russian Federation of May 15, 2018, No. 215).

=== Ministry of Digital Development, Telecommunications and Mass Media ===
Formed on May 15, 2018, by renaming the Ministry of Communications and Mass Communications of the Russian Federation (Decree of the President of the Russian Federation of May 15, 2018, No. 215).

Name	Date of taking office	Date of removal from office
Konstantin Noskov (b. 1978)	May 18, 2018	January 21, 2020
Maksut Shadaev (b. 1979)	January 21, 2020	Present

== Sources ==
- Abel Yanovsky. Ministry of the Interior // Brockhaus and Efron Encyclopedic Dictionary: in 86 Volumes (82 Volumes and 4 Additional) – Saint Petersburg, 1890–1907
- State Power of the Soviet Union. The Supreme Bodies of Power and Administration and Their Leaders, 1923–1991: Historically–Biographical Information / Author, Compiled by Vladimir Ivkin – Moscow: ROSSPEN, 1999 – 637, [2] Pages – ISBN 5-8243-0014-3
- Mail // Brockhaus and Efron Encyclopedic Dictionary: in 86 Volumes (82 Volumes and 4 Additional) – Saint Petersburg, 1890–1907
- Denis Shilov. Statesmen of the Russian Empire. Heads of Higher and Central Institutions. 1802–1917: Bibliographic Information / Denis Shilov; European University in Saint Petersburg – Saint Petersburg: Dmitry Bulanin, 2001 – 830 Pages – ISBN 5-86007-227-9
