= People's Commissariat for Posts and Telegraphs =

People's Commissariat for Posts and Telegraphs may refer to:

- People's Commissariat for Posts and Telegraphs of the RSFSR (1917–1923)
- People's Commissariat for Posts and Telegraphs of the USSR (1923–1932)

== See also ==
- Council of People's Commissars
- Minister for Posts and Telegraphs
- Minister of Posts, Telegraphs, and Telephones
- Ministry of Post and Telegraphs (Poland)
- People's Commissariat for Communications of the USSR
- Post & Telegraph
- P&TLuxembourg
- Post and Telegraph Department (disambiguation)
- Postal, telegraph and telephone service
- Postes, télégraphes et téléphones (France)
