= Ministry of Communications (Soviet Union) =

Government ministry of the Soviet Union

- Министерство связи СССР
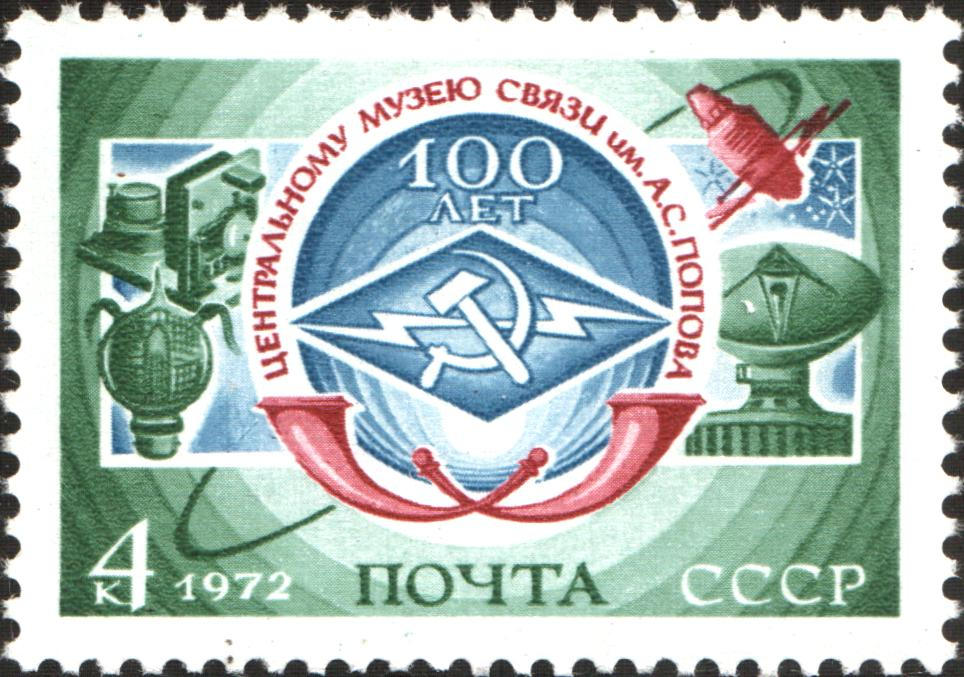
- Official emblem of the Ministry on a Soviet Union stamp (1972). The Ministry was responsible for issuing postage stamps in the USSR

Agency overview
- Formed: 6 July 1923
- Preceding agency: People's Commissariat for Communications
- Dissolved: 26 December 1991
- Superseding agency: Ministry of Communications of the Russian Federation
- Jurisdiction: Government of the Soviet Union
- Headquarters: 7 Gorky Street, Moscow, RSFSR, Soviet Union; 55°45′26″N 37°36′53″E
- Annual budget: varied
- Child agency: Soyuzpechat

The Ministry of Communications of the Union of Soviet Socialist Republics (USSR) (Russian: Министерство связи СССР) was the central state administration body on communications in the Soviet Union from 1923 to 1991. During its existence it had three names: People's Commissariat for Posts and Telegraphs (1923–32), People's Commissariat for Communications (1932–46) and Ministry of Communications (1946–1991). It had authority over the postal, telegraph and telephone communications as well as public radio, technical infrastructure of radio and television broadcasting, and the distribution of periodicals in the country.

== History ==
=== Posts and Telegraphs (1923–32) ===
In 1922, the Soviet Union was formed. Its founding document stated that, among different areas, "jurisdiction of the Union of Soviet Socialist Republics, as represented by its supreme bodies shall be":

h) the establishment of the principles and the general plan of the national economy of the Union, as well as to conclude concession agreements;
and) regulate the transport and postal-telegraph case.

— Agreement on the Formation of the USSR (1922), Resolution of the First Congress of Soviets of the Union of Soviet Socialist Republics, Ed. CEC of the USSR, Moscow.

The same document defined that "the Executive Body of the Central Executive Committee of the Union is the Council of People's Commissars of the Union of Soviet Socialist Republics (CPC Union), elected by the Central Executive Committee of the Union for the term of the latter," and it would comprise the People's Commissar for Posts and Telegraphs. In the Council of People's Commissars of the Union republics, the People's Commissariat for Posts and Telegraphs had "an advisory capacity."

Accordingly, after the formation of the Soviet Union, the People's Commissariat for Posts and Telegraphs of the USSR was created in 1923 instead of the similar agency of the RSFSR. Regulations on the new Commissariat were approved by the USSR Central Executive Committee session on 12 November 1923.

In 1924, the People's Commissariat for Posts and Telegraphs set up a mobile postal service, providing it to rural localities. In 1925, an area inhabited by 68% of the USSR population (27% of the population centres) was covered by home delivery of mail. Regular radio broadcasting started in 1924, with radio broadcast stations being established in 1925 in Leningrad, Kiev, Minsk, Nizhny Novgorod, and other cities.

By 1929, the telegraph networks destroyed in the Civil War of 1918–1920 were restored to the pre-World War I level. Further improvement of telegraph communication was aimed at a conversion to letter-printing telegraphs. The first facsimile communications line was opened in 1929. In the same year, an automatic switching system for 6,000 numbers was opened in Rostov-on-Don. In 1930, two regional automatic switching systems were launched in Moscow.

On 17 January 1932, the Commissariat was re-organised and renamed the People's Commissariat for Communications.

=== 1932–1946 ===
The Commissariat was organised on 17 January 1932 by renaming from the People's Commissariat for Posts and Telegraphs of the USSR.

Over the years of the pre-World War II five-year plans (1929–1940), there was a rapid development of the Soviet communication system and industry. High-frequency equipment was introduced for long-distance communication. Use of such equipment allowed to transmit three, four, or 12 telephone calls over a pair of wires or 16 telegrams over a single telephone channel. In 1939, construction of a high-frequency three-channel line between Moscow and Khabarovsk (8,600 km) provided dependable communication between the USSR central regions and the Far East. By late 1940, the Moscow Central Telegraph Office had 22 facsimile lines. In 1941, a 12-channel line between Moscow and Leningrad was put into operation that meant the concurrent transmission of 12 telephone calls over a single pair of wires.

In the 1930s, the rural (intraraion) telephone communication was first set up. In 1940, it reached 70% of the areas under rural soviets, 76.3% of the sovkhozes, and 9.2% of the kolkhozes.

The radio broadcasting network experienced significant expansion. In the early 1930s, the Comintern Radio Station, with a power of 500 kW, was constructed along with a number of other stations with a power of 100 kW each. The receiving network was augmented, while a system for wired broadcasting via rebroadcasting centres was arranged. Regular television programming was initiated in 1939.

During the Great Patriotic War of 1941–1945, steady communication was organised between the General Headquarters of the Supreme Command and the fronts. Soviet postal service administered by the People's Commissariat for Communications of the USSR delivered billions of letters via the postal network and the military postal units of the army in the field. Up to 70 million parcels per month were delivered to the Soviet Army front from the rear under extremely difficult and often very dangerous conditions.

Because of the war time, almost half the telephone offices became inoperative but were restored soon after the war. By 1948, telephone system capacity and number of installed telephone sets exceeded the prewar level.

In the postwar times, mail service had undergone quantitative and qualitative changes. In 1946, the People's Commissariat for Communications of the USSR was transformed into the Ministry of Communications.

=== As a ministry (1946–1991) ===
It was originally set up as an all-Union ministry, and in December 1954 transformed into a Union-Republican one.

The Ministry of Communications of the USSR was responsible for the maintenance and further development of all types of communications in general use, and technical means of radio and television broadcasting. It was also in charge of the periodicals distribution as well as the provision of technological progress in the industry, the quality of communication services, and the most complete and continuous needs of the country media and communication services. Additionally, the Ministry was responsible for issuing postage stamps and postal stationery (envelopes, postcards, etc.), which were used in the postal system of the Soviet Union.

The Ministry was terminated on 26 December 1991 due to the abolition of the Soviet Union. All Ministry assets, premises and other facilities in the territory of the Russian Federation were delegated to the Ministry of Communications of the Russian Federation.

Examples of postal and telegraph sendings at the time of the Ministry of Communications of the USSR

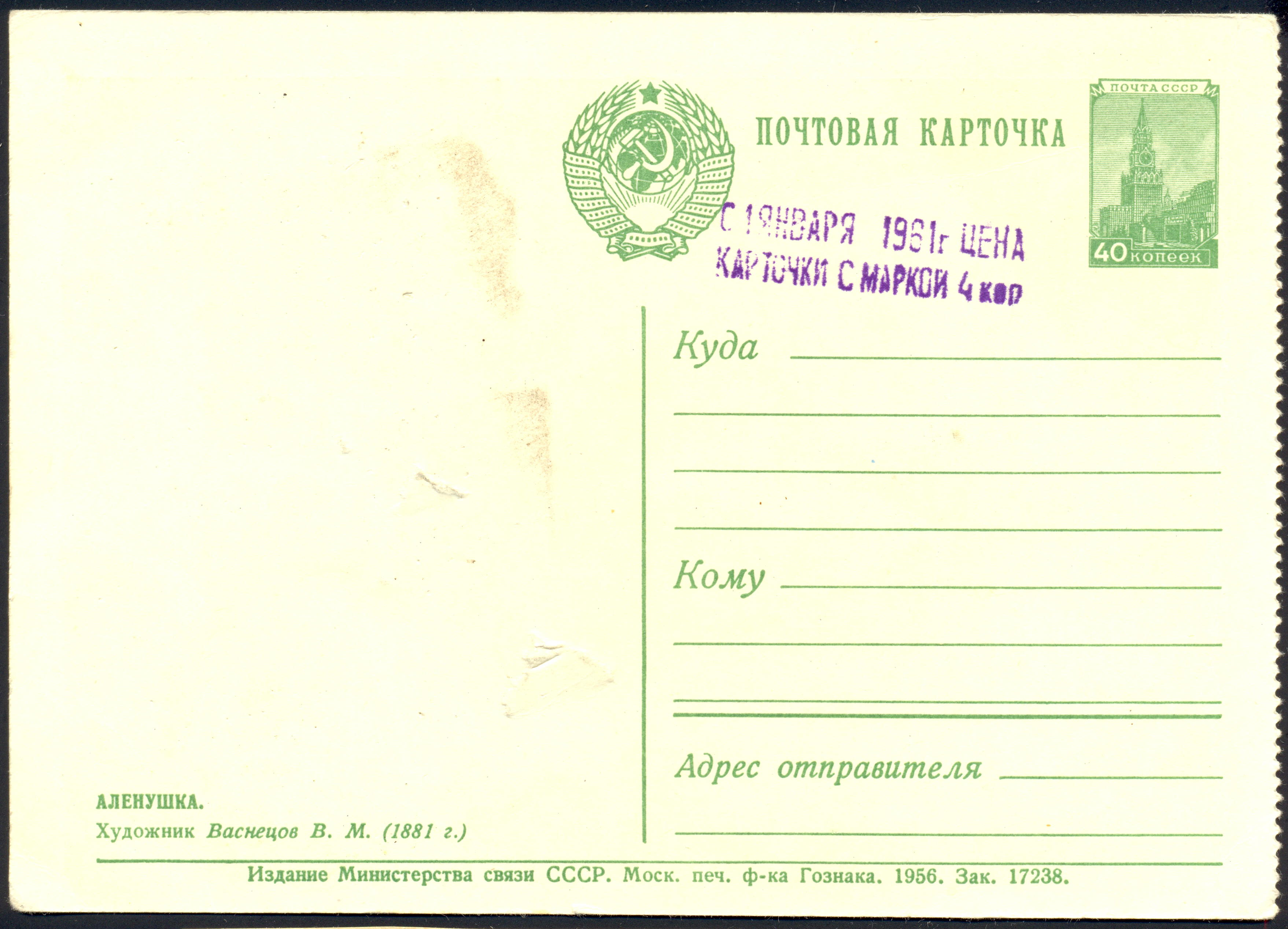
Address side of a 1956 illustrated stamped postcard marked with a surcharge of the new price in 1961

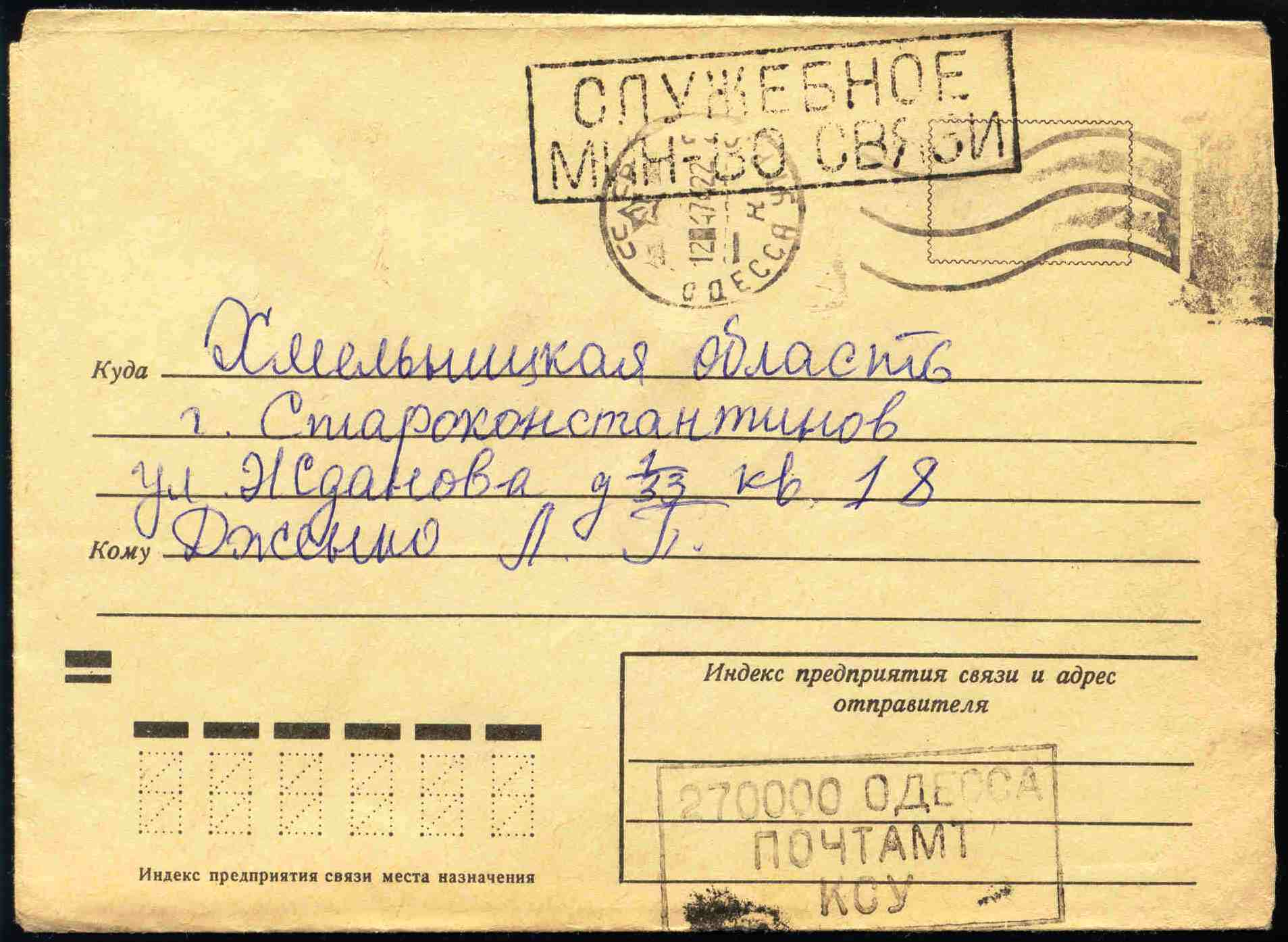
Official mail cover postmarked in Odessa on 12 April 1974. The auxiliary postal marking states: "Official / Ministry of Communications" (Russian: СЛУЖЕБНОЕ / МИН-ВО СВЯЗИ)

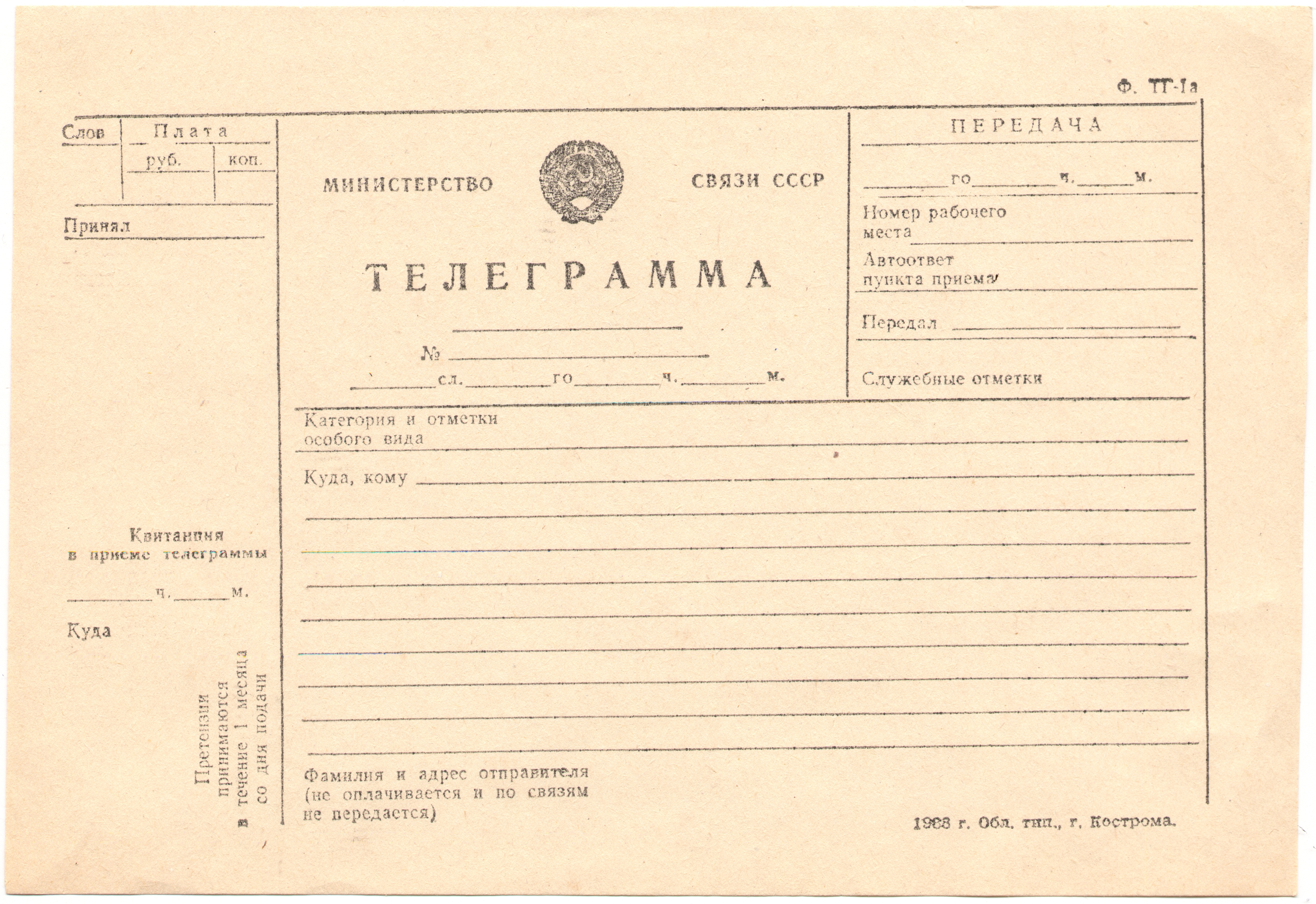
A blank telegram form (1988)

== Philatelic policy ==
=== 1923–1932 ===
The Commissariat was the central office responsible for issuing postage stamps of the Soviet Union. In addition to overprinting older issues, the government created new postage stamps. Between 1922 and 1930, there were also stamps meant to raise money for famine relief, child welfare and other charity purposes.

The government also tried to generate money from stamp sales abroad. However, at the beginning this amount was quite small as compared, for example, to the total of 522.6 million rubles for all Soviet exports during 1923–1924. Since 1929, the Soviet government had started paying more attention to this revenue source and selling more stamps abroad. Such sales had both financial and propagandistic objectives.

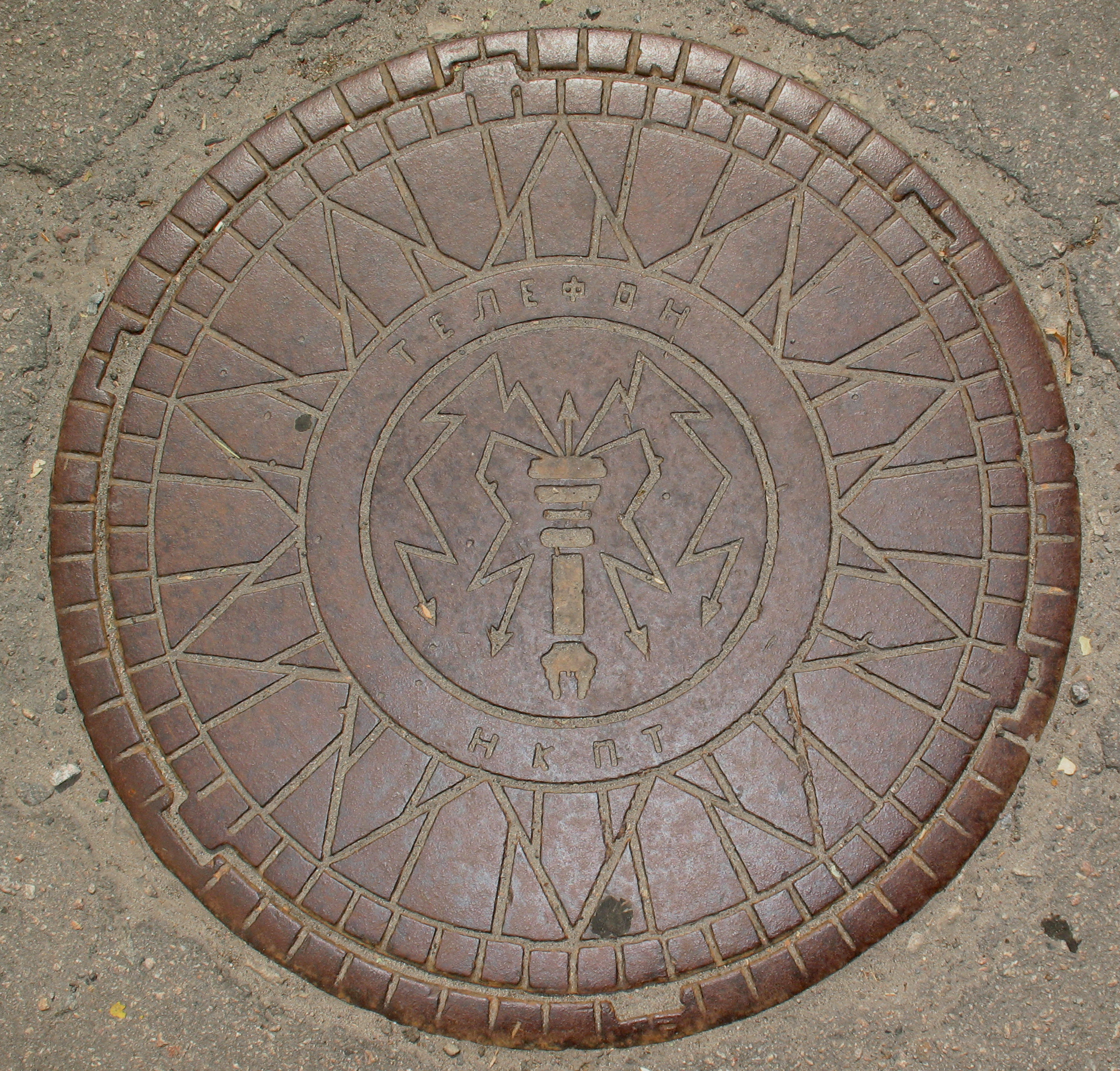
Another telephone hatch version, with the official emblem of the Commissariat, Kharkov, 1929

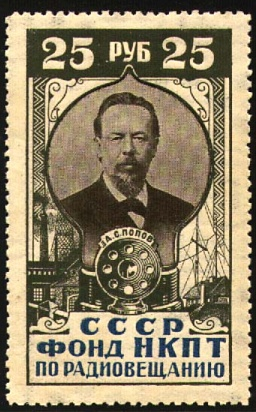
Revenue stamp issued by the Commissariat to support radio broadcasting that depicts A.S. Popov, 1926

=== 1932–1946 ===
The People's Commissariat for Communications of the USSR was responsible for issuing postage stamps. It also sold stamps to philatelic organisations and collectors. By 1939–1940, the revenue from stamp sales through philatelic organisations was significant. In that same year, it secured over 85% of the total income of the Commissariat (or 17.28 million rubles of 19.833 million rubles). The Soviet government was not an exception among the other states in terms of deriving a profit from the postage stamp trade. In fact, many governments around the world developed similar policies for issuing stamps:

Most stamps, particularly in the 1920s and afterwards, lost their purely postal character in favour of other ends. Some countries began to give philatelic issues their special attention in order to derive a sizable part of the national income from the sale of stamps.

— Carlos Stoetzer, "Postage Stamps as Propaganda", Washington, D.C.: Public Affairs Press, 1953, 2.

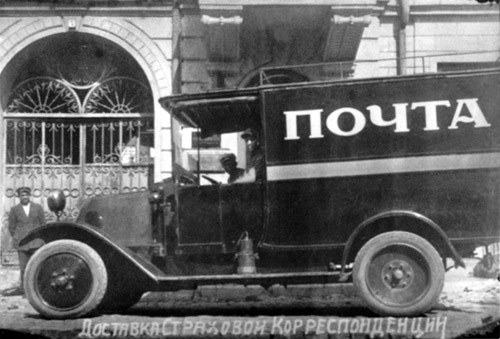
Soviet postal truck in the 1930s

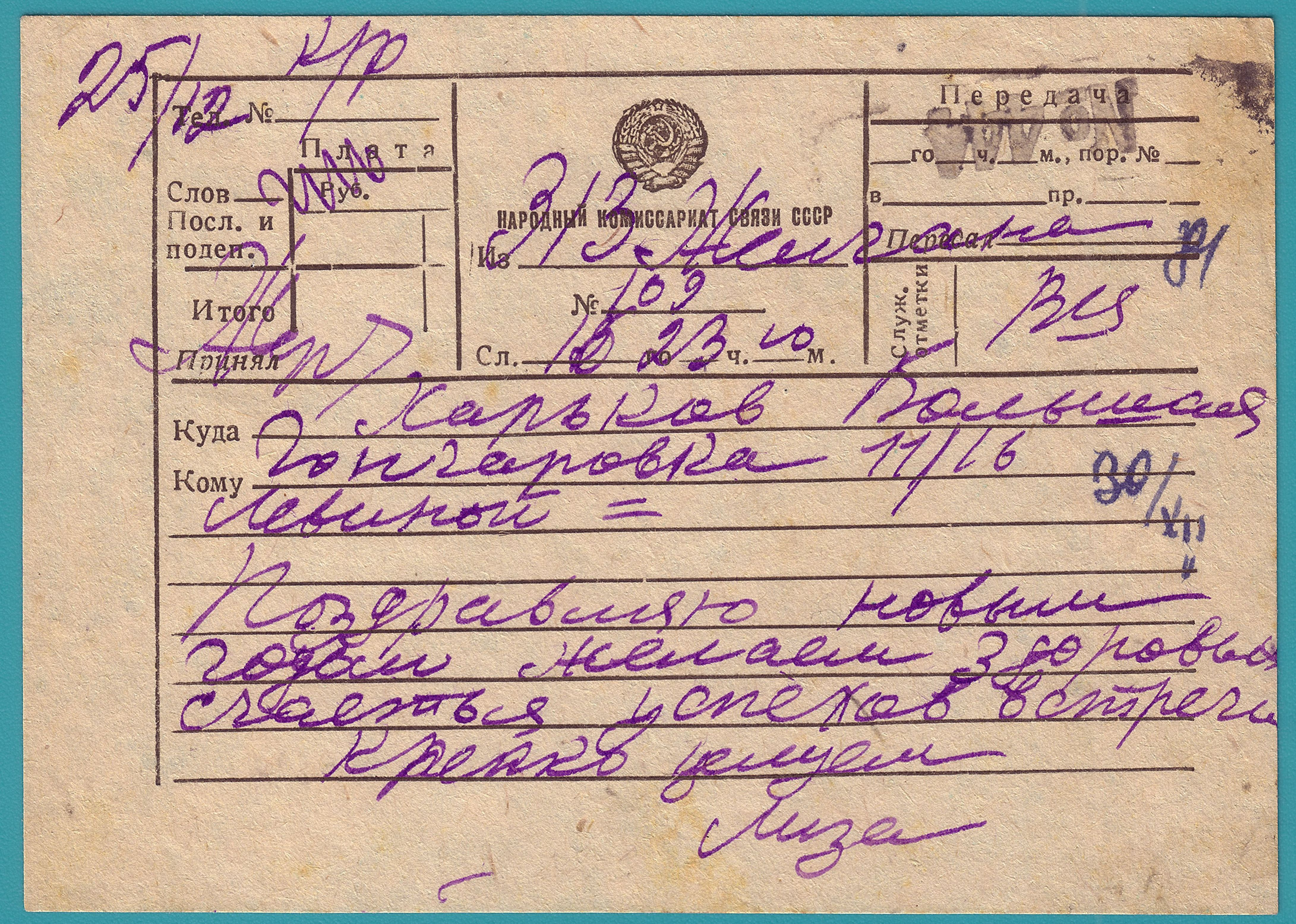
Telegramme of the People's Commissariat for Communications sent to freed Kharkov, 1944

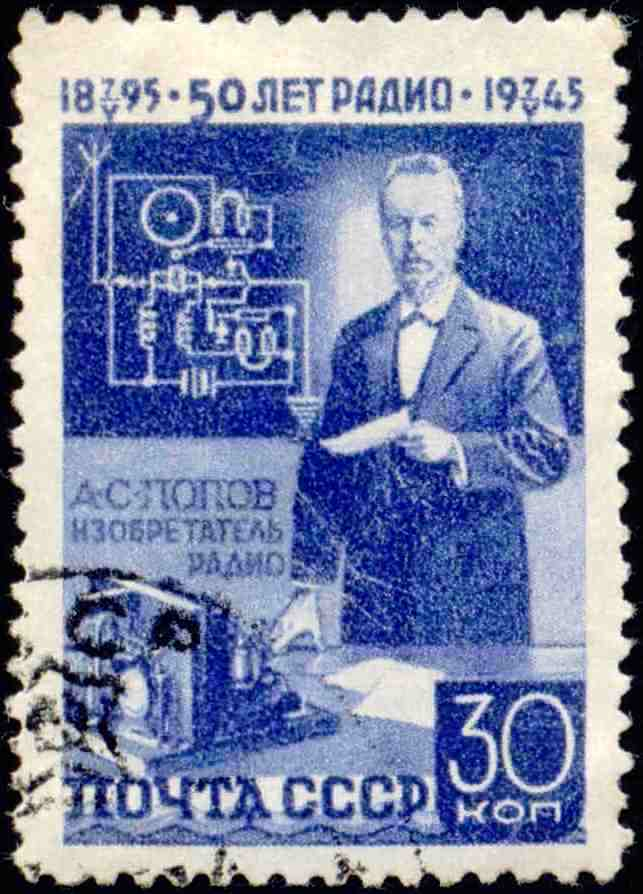
Stamp issued by the People's Commissariat for Communications to commemorate the 50th anniversary of the invention of radio by A.S. Popov, 1945

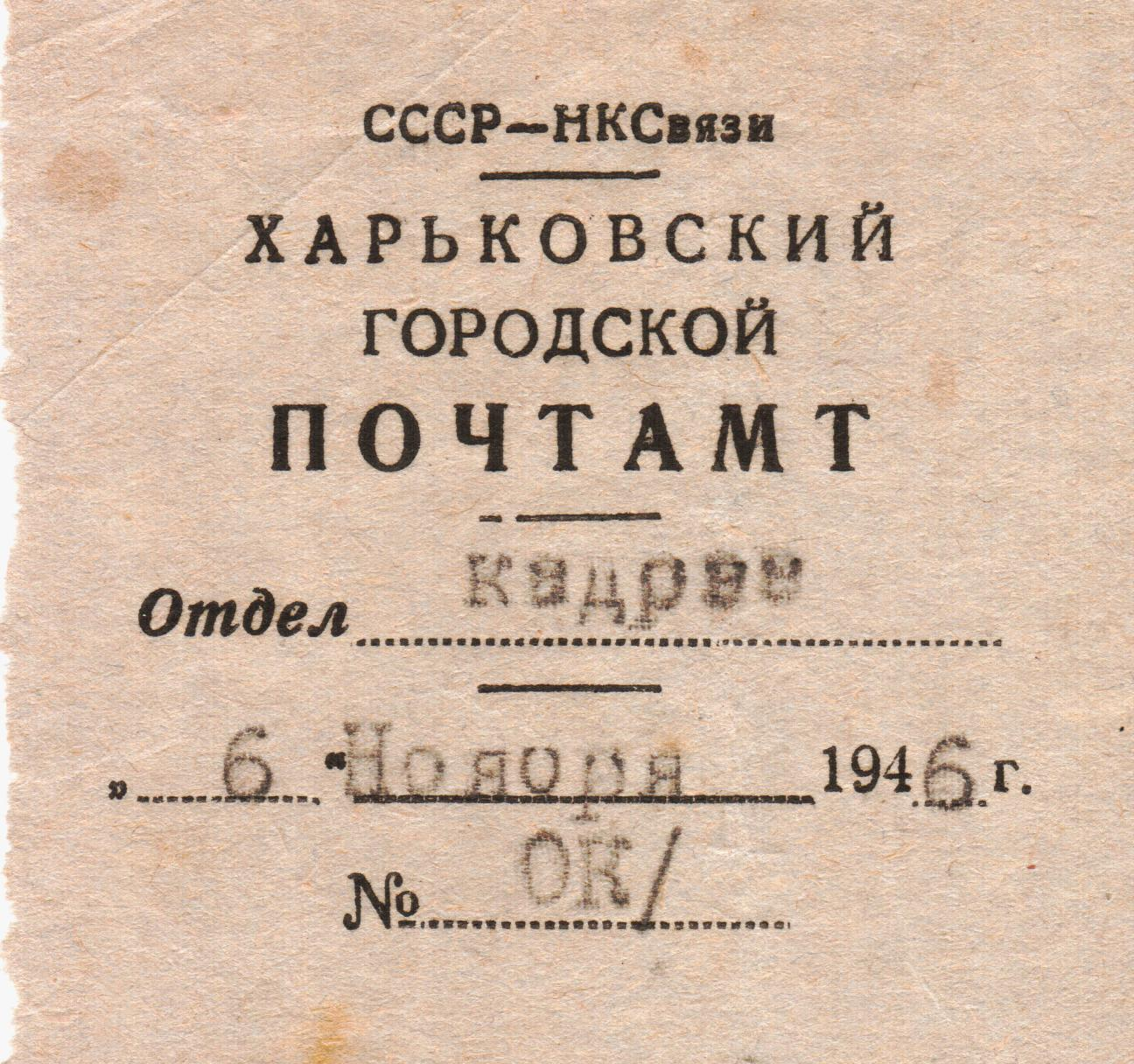
Letterhead of the Kharkov City Post Office, People's Commissariat for Communications, 1946

== Departments ==
The Ministry included two major departments:

- General Directorate of Post, whose administrative tasks were organization and management of the postal system in the USSR, and
- General Directorate of Periodicals Distribution Soyuzpechat (later, the Central Retail and Subscription Agency Soyuzpechat and since 1994, JSC 'Agency Rospechat') that was also in charge of organizing trade of philatelic materials through its unit, the “Soyuzpechat” Central Philatelic Agency (CPA).

== People's Commissars and Ministers ==
Heads	Term of office
Ivan Smirnov	6 July 1923 – 1 January 1927
Artemi Lyubovitsh	1 January 1927 – 17 January 1928
Nikolai Antipov	17 January 1928 – 30 March 1931
Alexey Rykov	30 March 1931 – 26 September 1936
Genrikh Yagoda	26 September 1936 – 5 April 1937
Innokenty Khalepsky	5 April 1937 – 17 August 1937
Matvei Berman	17 August 1937 – 1 July 1938
(vacant)	1 July 1938 – 7 May 1939
Ivan Peresypkin	10 May 1939 – 20 July 1944
Konstantin Sergeychuk	20 July 1944 – 30 March 1948
Nikolai Psurtsev	30 March 1948 – 3 September 1975
Nikolai Talyzin	3 September 1975 – 24 October 1980
Vasily Shamshin	24 October 1980 – 7 June 1989
Erlen Pervyshin	6 June 1989 – 26 December 1990
Gennady Kudryavtsev	26 December 1990 – 26 December 1991

== Publications ==
Under the auspices of the USSR Ministry of Communications and Soyuzpechat, the following periodicals and publications were issued:

- magazine Vestnik Sviazi (Russian: «Вестник связи»; Communications Journal),
- magazine Filateliya SSSR (Russian: «Филателия СССР»; Philately of the USSR), jointly with the All-Union Society of Philatelists (Russian: Всесоюзное общество филателистов),
- stamp catalogs, and price sheets of stamps of the USSR and other philatelic materials.

== See also ==
- Ministries of the Soviet Union
- Ministry of Communications and Mass Media of Russia
- People's Commissariat for Posts and Telegraphs of the RSFSR
- Postage stamps and postal history of Russia
- Soviet and post-Soviet postage rates
- Soviet Union stamp catalogue
- Stamps of the Soviet Union
