= Konstantin Sergeychuk =

- Константин Сергейчук

Minister of Communications of the Soviet Union
- In office 20 July 1944 – 30 March 1948
- Prime Minister: Joseph Stalin
- Preceded by: Ivan Peresypkin
- Succeeded by: Nikolay Psurtsev

Personal details
- Born: 1 January 1906 Kiev, Kiev Governorate, Russian Empire
- Died: 22 March 1971 (aged 65) Moscow, Soviet Union
- Resting place: Novodevichye Cemetery
- Party: CPSU
- Education: Kiev Energy Institute

Konstantin Yakovlevich Sergeychuk (Russian: Константин Яковлевич Сергейчук; 23 January 1906 - 22 March 1971) was a Soviet politician who served as the People's Commissar of Communications and then as the Minister of Communications of the Soviet Union from 1944 to 1948.

== Biography ==
In 1926, he graduated from the electrical engineering department of the Kyiv Railway Technical School, and in 1930, from the Kiev Energy Institute. He worked as an electrician on the Southern Railway in Simferopol, then as an engineer, deputy head of the communications department, head of the communications group of the 5th operational region, and deputy head of the 12th signaling and communications section of the Southwestern Railway in Odessa. From November 1934 to September 1938, he was head of the 1st signaling and communications section of the Southwestern Railway in Kyiv.

In September 1938, by order of the People's Commissariat of Railways of the Soviet Union, he was sent to graduate school at the Leningrad Institute of Communications Engineers but was unable to complete his studies as in June 1939 he was summoned to Moscow by the Central Committee of the Communist Party of the Soviet Union and by a resolution of the Council of People's Commissars of the USSR, he was confirmed as a member of the Board of the People's Commissariat of Communications of the Soviet Union and appointed as First Deputy People's Commissar of Communications. During the Great Patriotic War he was active establishing communications between the front and the rear, commissioning new communication lines and powerful radio stations, and restoring damaged and destroyed industries and communication lines. From 1944 to 1946 he served as People's Commissar of Communications in Stalin's first government and following the governmental reform which established the Council of Ministers, from 1946 to 1948 he served as Minister of Communications in Stalin's second government. In 1948-53, he was the director of the Research Institute of the Cable Industry of the Ministry of Electrical Industry. He was a member of the second convocation of the Supreme Soviet. From 1953 to 1970, he served again as First Deputy Minister of Communications. Since December 1970, he has been a personal pensioner of union significance. In 2005 the Russian Post issued a postal card honouring him. Following his death in 1971 he was buried at Novodevichy Cemetery.

== Awards ==
- Order of Lenin
- Order of the Patriotic War
- Order of the Red Banner of Labour
- Order of the Badge of Honour
- Jubilee Medal "In Commemoration of the 100th Anniversary of the Birth of Vladimir Ilyich Lenin"
