= People's Commissariat for Posts and Telegraphs of the USSR =

Soviet government agency (1923–1932)

- Народный комиссариат почт и телеграфов СССР (НКПТ, НКПиТ, Наркомпочтель СССР)
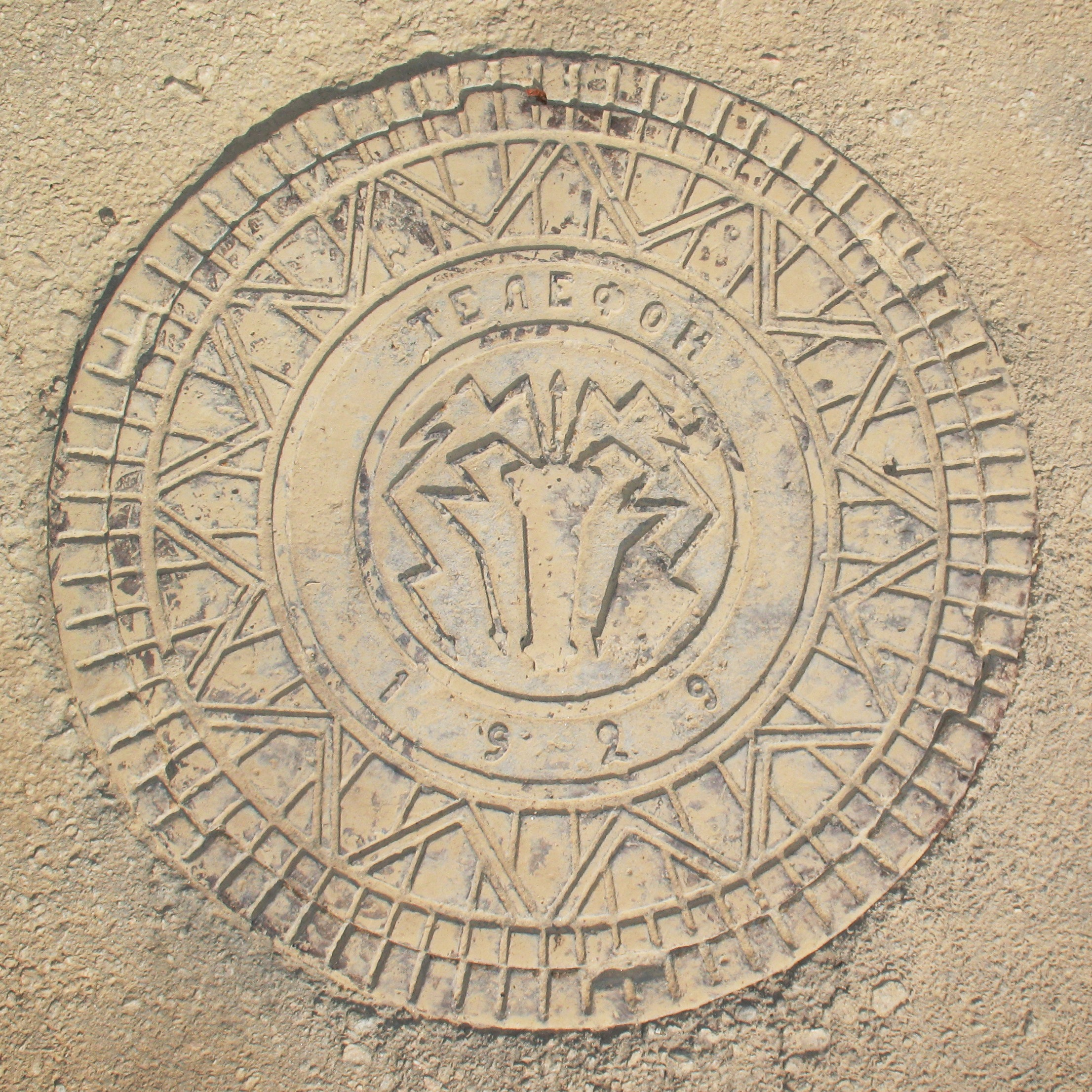
- Official emblem of the Commissariat on a telephone hatch in Kharkov

Agency overview
- Formed: 12 November 1923; 102 years ago
- Preceding agency: People's Commissariat for Posts and Telegraphs of the RSFSR (since 8 November 1917)
- Dissolved: 17 January 1932; 94 years ago
- Superseding agency: People's Commissariat for Communications
- Jurisdiction: Council of People's Commissars
- Headquarters: 7 Gorky Street, Moscow, RSFSR, Soviet Union; 55°45′26″N 37°36′53″E
- Annual budget: varied
- Agency executive: Alexey Rykov (1931–32), People's Commissar for Posts and Telegraphs
- Child agency: several

People's Commissariat for Posts and Telegraphs of the USSR was the central organ of the Soviet Union government that was in charge of the organisation and administration of the different forms of communication including posts. It existed between 1923 and 1932.

== History ==
In 1922, the Soviet Union was formed. Its founding document stated that, among different areas, "jurisdiction of the Union of Soviet Socialist Republics, as represented by its supreme bodies shall be":

h) the establishment of the principles and the general plan of the national economy of the Union, as well as to conclude concession agreements;
and) regulate the transport and postal-telegraph case.

— Agreement on the Formation of the USSR (1922), Resolution of the First Congress of Soviets
of the Union of Soviet Socialist Republics, Ed. CEC of the USSR, Moscow.

The same document defined that "the Executive Body of the Central Executive Committee of the Union is the Council of People's Commissars of the Union of Soviet Socialist Republics (CPC Union), elected by the Central Executive Committee of the Union for the term of the latter," and it would comprise the People's Commissar for Posts and Telegraphs. In the Council of People's Commissars of the Union republics, the People's Commissariat for Posts and Telegraphs had "an advisory capacity."

Accordingly, after the formation of the Soviet Union, the People's Commissariat for Posts and Telegraphs of the USSR was created in 1923 instead of the similar agency of the RSFSR. Regulations on the new Commissariat were approved by the USSR Central Executive Committee session on 12 November 1923.

In 1924, the People's Commissariat for Posts and Telegraphs set up a mobile postal service, providing it to rural localities. In 1925, an area inhabited by 68% of the USSR population (27% of the population centres) was covered by home delivery of mail. Regular radio broadcasting started in 1924, with radio broadcast stations being established in 1925 in Leningrad, Kiev, Minsk, Nizhny Novgorod, and other cities.

By 1929, the telegraph networks destroyed in the Civil War of 1918–1920 were restored to the pre-World War I level. Further improvement of telegraph communication was aimed at a conversion to letter-printing telegraphs. The first facsimile communications line was opened in 1929. In the same year, an automatic switching system for 6,000 numbers was opened in Rostov-on-Don. In 1930, two regional automatic switching systems were launched in Moscow.

On 17 January 1932, the Commissariat was re-organised and renamed the People's Commissariat for Communications of the USSR.

== Philatelic policy ==
The Commissariat was the central office responsible for issuing postage stamps of the Soviet Union. In addition to overprinting older issues, the government created new postage stamps. Between 1922 and 1930, there were also stamps meant to raise money for famine relief, child welfare and other charity purposes.

The government also tried to generate money from stamp sales abroad. However, at the beginning this amount was quite small as compared, for example, to the total of 522.6 million rubles for all Soviet exports during 1923–1924. Since 1929, the Soviet government had started paying more attention to this revenue source and selling more stamps abroad. Such sales had both financial and propagandistic objectives.

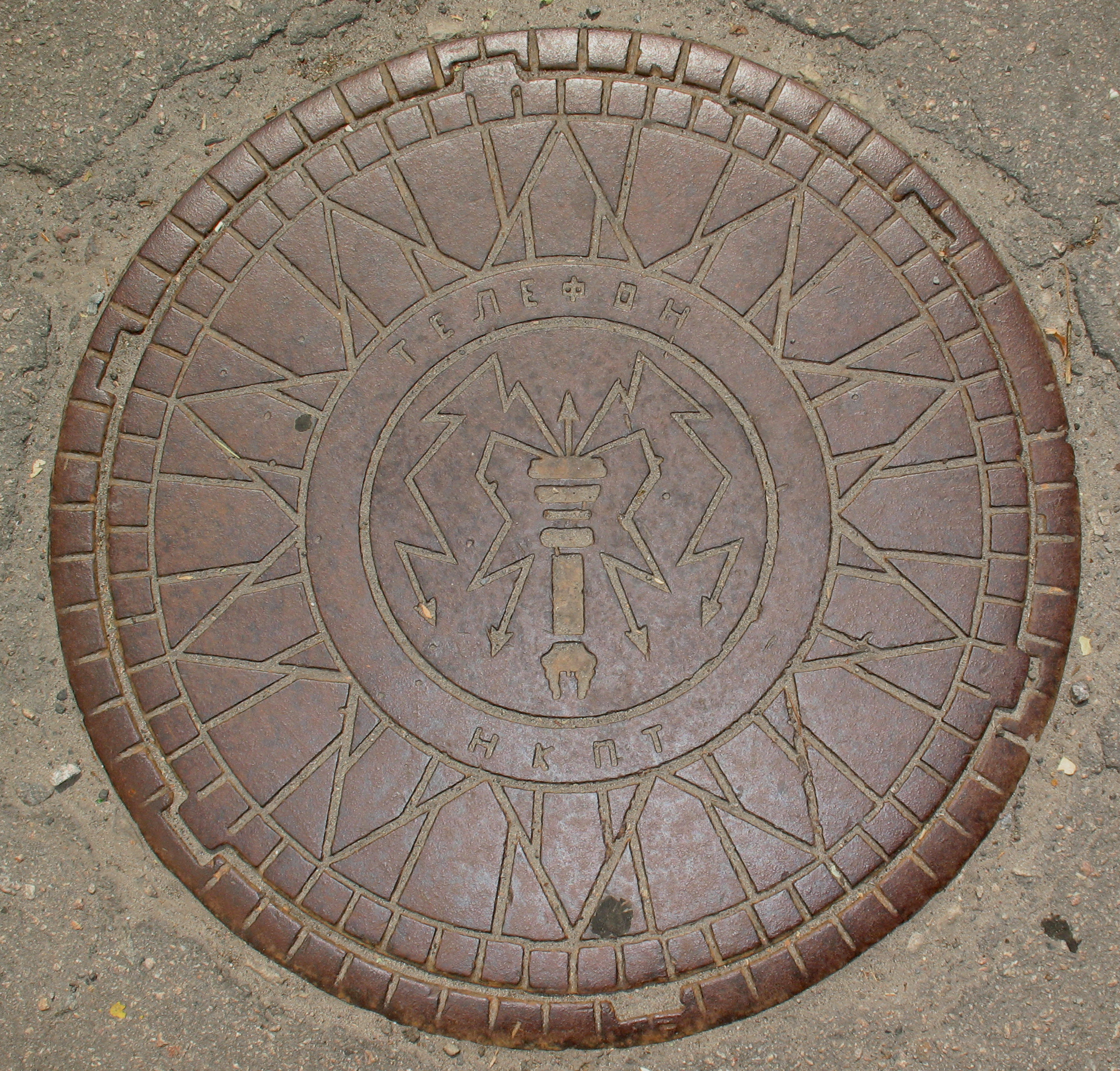
Another telephone hatch version, with the official emblem of the Commissariat, Kharkov, 1929

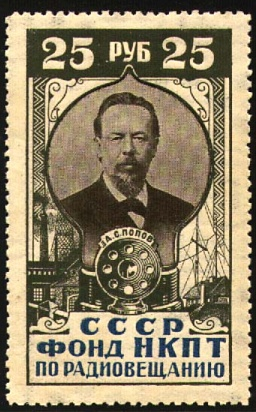
Revenue stamp issued by the Commissariat to support radio broadcasting that depicts A.S. Popov, 1926

== List of Commissars ==
The following chief officers supervised the Commissariat over the years:

People's Commissar for Posts and Telegraphs of the USSR	Term of office
Ivan Smirnov	6 July 1921 – 12 November 1925
Artemi Lyubovitsh	12 November 1927 – 17 January 1928
Nikolai Antipov	17 January 1928 – 30 March 1931
Alexey Rykov	30 March 1931 – 17 January 1932

== See also ==
- Council of People's Commissars
- International trading tax stamp
- People's Commissariat for Communications of the USSR
- People's Commissariat for Posts and Telegraphs of the RSFSR
- Postage stamps and postal history of Russia
- Soviet and post-Soviet postage rates
- Soviet Union stamp catalogue
- Stamps of the Soviet Union
