= Nikolay Psurtsev =

Soviet government activist, minister of communications in USSR (1948–1975)

- Николай Псурцев
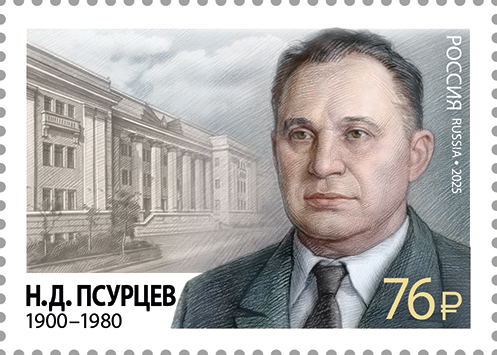
- Psurtsev on a 2025 stamp of Russia

Minister of Communications of the Soviet Union
- In office 30 March 1948 – 3 September 1975
- Prime Minister: Joseph Stalin; Georgy Malenkov; Nikolay Bulganin; Nikita Khrushchev; Alexey Kosygin
- Preceded by: Konstantin Sergeychuk
- Succeeded by: Nikolay Talyzin

Personal details
- Born: 4 February 1900 Kiev, Kiev Governorate, Russian Empire
- Died: 9 February 1980 (aged 80) Moscow, Soviet Union
- Resting place: Novodevichye Cemetery
- Party: All–Union Communist Party (Bolsheviks) – Communist Party of the Soviet Union (since 1919)
- Education: Military Electrotechnical Academy of Communications
- Awards: Hero of Socialist Labour; Order of Lenin; Order of the October Revolution; Order of the Red Banner; Order of Kutuzov; Order of Suvorov Medals: Medal "In Commemoration of the 100th Anniversary of the Birth of Vladimir Ilyich Lenin"; Medal "For the Defence of Moscow"; Medal "For the Defence of Stalingrad"; Medal "For the Victory over Germany in the Great Patriotic War 1941–1945"; Medal "For the Victory over Japan"; Jubilee Medal "XX Years of the Workers' and Peasants' Red Army"; Medal "Veteran of the Armed Forces of the Soviet Union"; Foreign Awards: Order of the British Empire

Military service
- Branch/service: Soviet Armed Forces
- Rank: Colonel General
- Commands: Communication Troops
- Battles/wars: Great Patriotic War

Nikolai Demyanovich Psurtsev (4 February 1900 – 9 February 1980) was a Soviet statesman and military leader who served as the Communication Troops and Minister of Communications of the Soviet Union.

== Biography ==
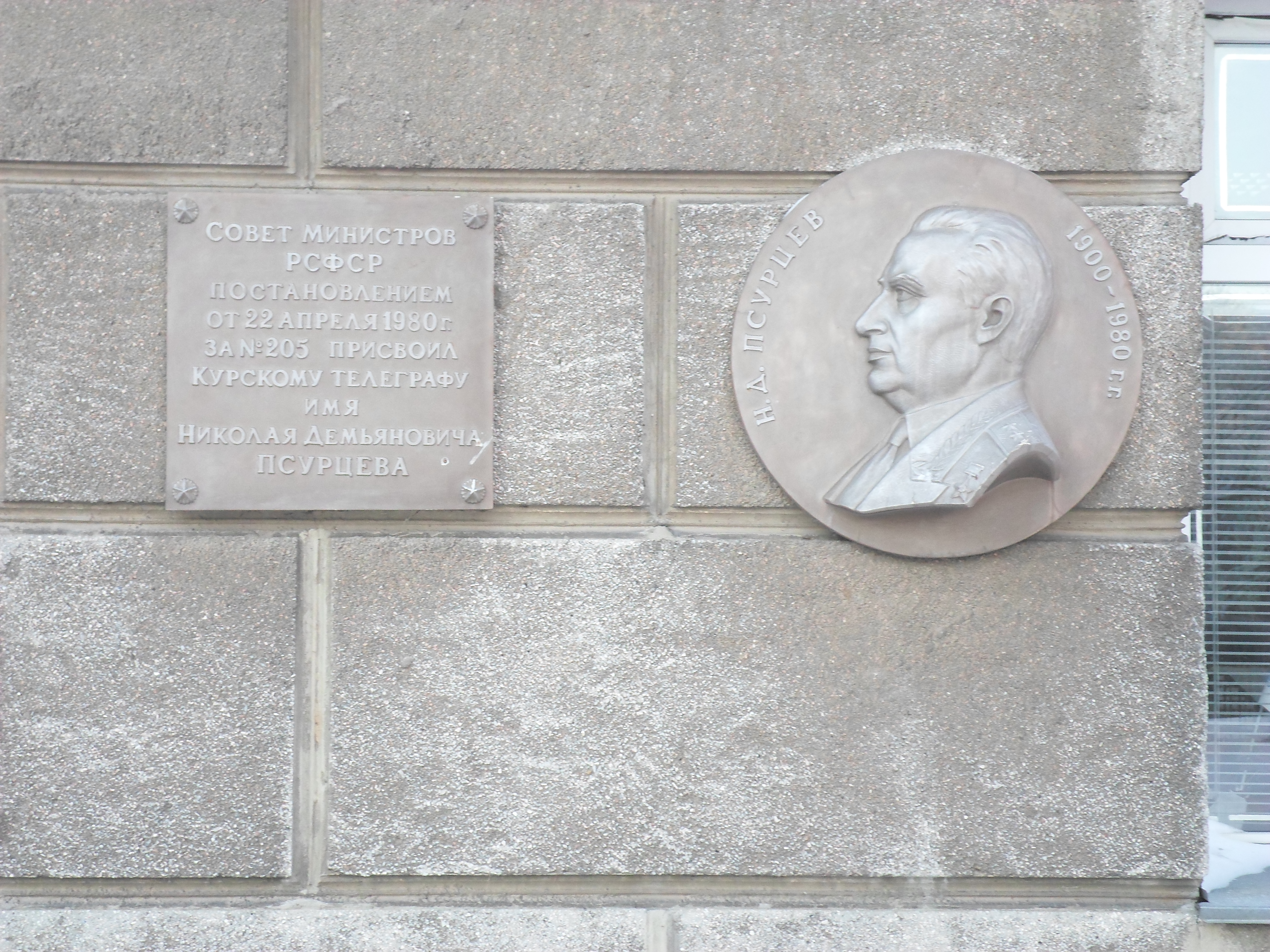
Memorial plaque to Nikolai Psurtsev in Kursk

From September 1915, he was an apprentice of a telegraph operator, then a telegraph operator at the Ponyri Station of the Kursk Railway, Kursk Station. From February to December 1918 he served as a Red Army soldier of Kozhevnikov's detachment, Ukrainian Front. From December 1918 to July 1920 he served as Telegraph operator of the Headquarters of the 9th Army, Commissar of the Telegraph of the Army. From July 1920 to January 1921 – Communications Commissioner of the 12th Army. From January to June 1921 he served as Commissioner of the Communications Department of the Headquarters of Ukraine and Crimea. From June to November 1921 he served as a Commissar of the 6th Communication Regiment. From November 1921, he was a student of the Higher Military School of Communications of the Red Army. From July 1924 he served as Deputy Chief of Communications of the Siberian Military District. Since November 1927 he served as Commander and commissar of the 10th Communications Regiment. From 1930 to 1934 he served as a Student of the Military Electrotechnical Academy of Communications.From February 1935 he served as Deputy Head of the Combat Training Department of the Communications Directorate of the Workers' and Peasants' Red Army. From January 1936, he was the Head of the Communications Center of the People's Commissariat of Defense of the Soviet Union. Since May 1937 he served as head of the Department of Long–distance Telephone and Telegraph Communications of the People's Commissariat of Communications of the Soviet Union. Since March 1938 he was Authorized by the People's Commissariat of Communications of the Soviet Union for the Far Eastern Krai. From April 1939 he served as Head of the Training Department of the Military Electrotechnical Academy of the Workers' and Peasants' Red Army. From December 1939 he served as Chief of Communications of the North–Western Front. Since April 1940 he served as head of the Training Department of the Military Electrotechnical Academy of the Workers' and Peasants' Red Army. From June 1940 he served as Deputy Head of the Communications Department of the Workers' and Peasants' Red Army. From July 1941 he served as head of the Communications Department of the Western Front. From February 1944 he served as First Deputy Head of the Main Directorate of Communications of the Workers' and Peasants' Red Army. From April 1946 he served as Chief of Communications of the General Staff of the Armed Forces of the Soviet Union. From November 1947 to March 1948 he served as First Deputy Minister of Communications of the Soviet Union. From March 1948 to September 1975 he served as Minister of Communications of the Soviet Union.

Since September 1975, he has been a personal pensioner of union significance.

He served as a deputy of the Supreme Soviet of the Soviet Union, 4–9 convocations (1954–1979). Candidate member of the Central Committee of the Communist Party of the Soviet Union in 1961–1976, Colonel General of the Communication Troops (1945).

He died on 9 February 1980, in Moscow. Buried at the Novodevichy Cemetery.

== Remembrance ==
- The Novosibirsk Electrotechnical Institute of Communications, the Kursk Telegraph and the Higher School for Training Communications Workers in Berlin (German Democratic Republic) are named after Nikolai Psurtsev.
- In 2000, a Russian postage stamp dedicated to Psurtsev was issued.

== Awards ==
- Hero of Socialist Labour (3 February 1975);
- 5 Orders of Lenin (21 February 1945; 3 February 1960; 18 July 1966; 3 February 1970; 3 February 1975);
- Order of the October Revolution (1 February 1980);
- 4 Orders of the Red Banner (21 March 1940; 2 January 1942; 3 November 1944; 24 June 1948);
- Order of Kutuzov, 1st Class (8 September 1945);
- Order of Suvorov, 2nd Class (9 April 1943);
- Order of Kutuzov, 2nd Class (28 September 1943);
- Medals.

=== Foreign awards ===
- Knight–Commander of the Order of the British Empire (Great Britain, 1944).

== Sources ==
- Nikolay Demyanovich Psurtsev // Big Philatelic Dictionary / Nikolay Vladyets, Leonid Ilyichev, Joseph Levitas ... [And Others]; Under the General Editorship of Nikolai Vladinets and Vadim Yakobs – Moscow: Radio and Communications, 1988 – Page 239 – 40,000 Copies – ISBN 5-256-00175-2
