= Saint Petersburg State University of Telecommunications =

University in Saint Petersburg, Russia

Coordinates: 59°56′05″N 30°19′04″E

The Bonch-Bruevich Saint Petersburg State University of Telecommunications
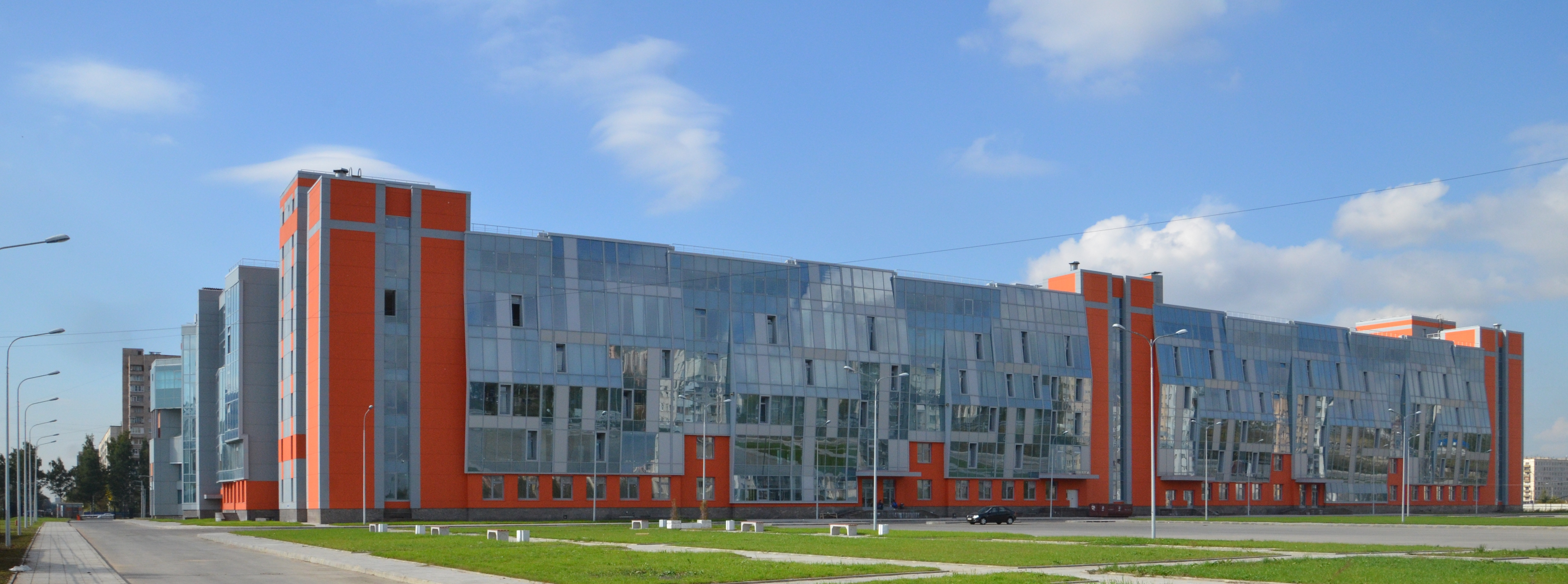
- Type: State
- Established: 1930
- Affiliations: European Universities and Companies of Informatics and Computer Electronics, Finish-Russian Innovation University
- Rector: Bachevsky Sergei Viktorovich
- Location: Saint Petersburg, Russia
- Website: www.sut.ru
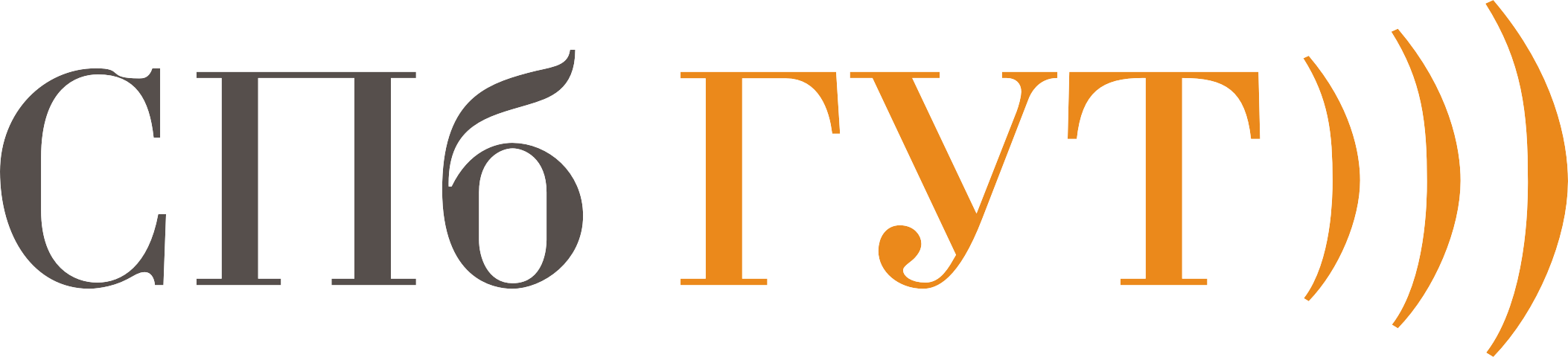

The Bonch-Bruevich Saint Petersburg State University of Telecommunications (Russian: Санкт-Петербургский государственный университет телекоммуникаций им. проф. М. А. Бонч-Бруевича; Russian: СПбГУТ, SPbSUT) is a communications university.

== History ==
The Saint Petersburg State University of Telecommunications was established in 1930 under the name Leningrad Institute of Communication Engineers. It offers training programs in various courses like: communications and telecommunications, information technologies, computer science, economics, management, advertising and public relations.

The Leningrad Institute of Communication Engineers was renamed as the Leningrad Electro-Technical Institute of Communications (LEIC), after Bonch-Bruevich.

In 1993, SPbSUT was reconstituted, and gained its new status as the Bonch-Bruevich Saint Petersburg State University of Telecommunications, by order of the Ministry of Communication of Russian Federation.

In 2017, SPbSUT took 1st place among 28 technical and technological universities in St. Petersburg in the “Best University of Russia” ranking and 4th place based on the results of grant activity of universities in St. Petersburg; entered the TOP 100 best industry universities in the annual National University Ranking; became a two-time winner of the St. Petersburg Government Prize in the categories “In the field of educational work with students, development of their professional skills” and “In the field of integration of education, science and industry."

In 2018, according to the results of the 2017/2018 academic year SPbSUT entered the TOP 10 best industrial universities of the IX annual National University Rating of the International Information Group "Interfax" and the international rating of higher education institutions ARES-2018 as a university demonstrating reliable quality of teaching, scientific activity and demand for graduates by employers. (Source)

In 2026 the university has a student enrollment ranging from 5,000 to 5,999.

== Structure ==
As of 2019, the university has 6 faculties, 3 institutes (including Institute of Military Education and the Research Institute of Communication Technologies), 19 Bachelor programs,11 Master programs, 7 PhD programs.

== Branches ==
Saint Petersburg College of Telecommunications

Arkhangelsk College of Telecommunications

Smolensk College of Telecommunications

== Notable alumni ==
- Boris Gryzlov
- Viktor Ivanov
- Leonid Reiman
