= Post and Telegraph Department =

Post and Telegraph Department may refer to:

- India Posts
- New Zealand Post Office
