= Artemy Lyubovich =

Soviet politician (1880–1938)

- Артемий Любович
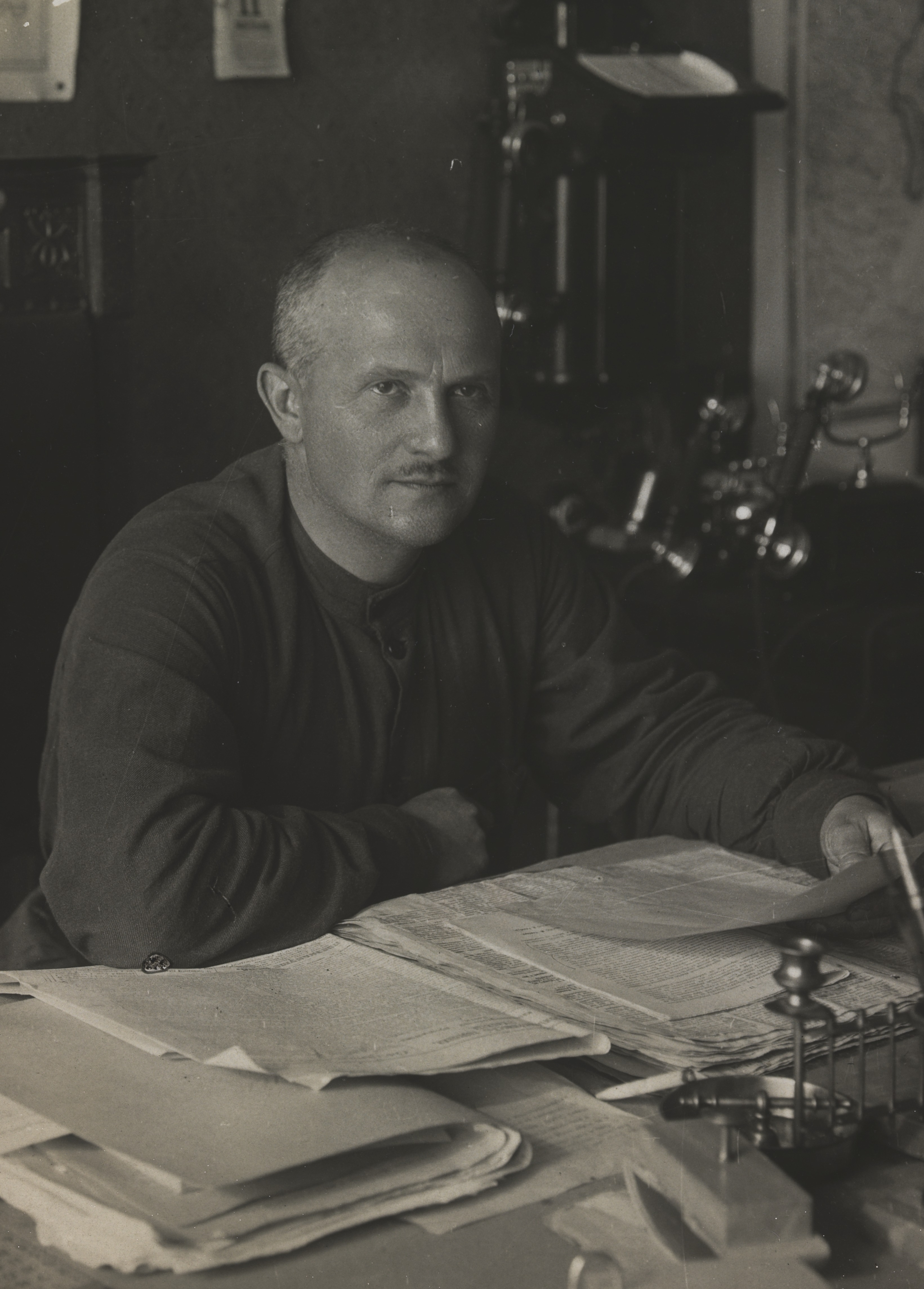
- Lyubovich in 1923

2nd People's Commissar of Posts and Telegraphs of the Soviet Union
- In office November 12, 1927 – January 16, 1928
- Prime Minister: Alexey Rykov
- Preceded by: Ivan Smirnov
- Succeeded by: Nikolay Antipov

4th People's Commissar of Posts and Telegraphs of the Russian Socialist Federative Soviet Republic
- In office March 24, 1920 – May 26, 1921
- Prime Minister: Vladimir Lenin
- Preceded by: Vadim Podbelsky
- Succeeded by: Valerian Dovgalevsky

Personal details
- Born: October 29, 1880 Zhitomir, Volhynian Governorate, Russian Empire
- Died: June 28, 1938 (aged 57) Moscow, Soviet Union
- Resting place: Minsk
- Party: All–Union Communist Party (Bolsheviks) (1917–1938)

Military service
- Allegiance: Russian Empire
- Branch/service: Imperial Russian Army
- Years of service: 1902–1906; 1914–1917
- Rank: Private

Artemy (Artyom) Moiseevich Lyubovich (October 29, 1880 – June 28, 1938) was a Soviet statesman, participant in the revolutionary movement, People's Commissar of Posts and Telegraphs of the Russian Socialist Federative Soviet Republic and the Soviet Union.

He was a member of the Bolshevik Party from March 1917.

== Biography ==
Lyubovich was the son of a construction foreman (tradesman) and graduated from a two–class city school in Zhitomir.

In 1896–1902, he was a telegraph operator in Zhitomir, then in Kiev. He then worked as a private telegraph operator of the 2nd Spark Company until 1906. Following this he was employed as telegraph operator in Kiev, then in Berdichev (from 1908) and Belaya Tserkov (from 1912). In 1914–1917 he was mobilized into the army and served as a private in the 6th Railway Battalion, then as a telegraph operator in the Kronstadt Telegraph Company.

In 1917, he became a member of the Kronstadt Committee of the Russian Social Democratic Labor Party (Bolsheviks), Chairman of the Council of Soldiers' and Sailors' Deputies, delegate to the 7th (April) All–Russian Conference and 6th and 7th Congresses of the Russian Communist Party (Bolsheviks), member of the Petrograd Military Revolutionary Committee at the Main Telegraph and Commissar of the Kexholm Reserve Regiment. After the October Revolution, he was the editor of the newspaper Izvestia of the Kronstadt Soviet, then a member of the board of the People's Commissariat of Posts and Telegraphs and Deputy People's Commissar. In January – May 1918, he was Chairman of the Kronstadt Committee of the Russian Social Democratic Labor Party (Bolsheviks). In 1918–1919 he was the Chairman of the All–Russian Union of Communications Workers. In 1919–1920 he was the Deputy People's Commissar of Posts and Telegraphs of the Russian Socialist Federative Soviet Republic and the Head of the Communications Department of the Workers' and Peasants' Red Army. In 1920–1921, he was acting People's Commissar of Posts and Telegraphs of the Russian Socialist Federative Soviet Republic.

From 1923, he was Deputy People's Commissar of Posts and Telegraphs of the Soviet Union. In 1927–1928 he was the Acting People's Commissar of Posts and Telegraphs of the Soviet Union. In 1928–1934 he was Commissioner of the People's Commissariat of Communications of the Soviet Union for the Far East, Eastern Siberia. In 1934–1935 he was at the disposal of the Central Committee of the All–Union Communist Party (Bolsheviks). In 1935–1937, he was Deputy Chairman of the Council of People's Commissars of the Belarusian Soviet Socialist Republic and Chairman of the State Planning Commission of the Republic.

The memoirs of the Belarusian party worker Yakov Drobinsky describe the methods of investigation in the Minsk Central Prison in 1938:

"At ten he was again led through this corridor, into this room – but what a difference! During the day it was a quiet corridor, quiet offices in which neat, well–groomed people leafed through folders. In the evening Andrei walked as if through a line – the cries of the tortured, the square cursing of the torturers rushed from all the rooms. A body lying on the floor flashed somewhere. Andrey saw a crimson familiar face. It was Lyubovich – an old Bolshevik, Deputy Chairman of the Council of People's Commissars of the Republic, Chairman of the State Planning Commission. He was in the first government created by Lenin in October 1917. He entered there as Deputy People's Commissar of Communications Podbelsky. He was a member of the Small Council of People's Commissars, worked with Lenin. Now he was lying on the floor, being whipped with rubber, and he, an old sixty–year–old man, shouted: "Mom!". An instant, but it stuck in my memory forever".

— Yakov Drobinsky. "Chronicle of One Investigation /August 1937 – December 1939/", Page 85

Convicted on June 28, 1938, by the Military Collegium of the Supreme Court of the Soviet Union to capital punishment. Charge: Articles 69, 79, 76 (participation in anti–Soviet right–wing organizations, sabotage in industry and agriculture). Shot on the same day, buried in Minsk. Lyubovich was rehabilitated on February 29, 1956, by the Military Collegium of the Supreme Court of the Soviet Union.

== Remembrance ==
On April 18, 2013, a memorial plaque to Artemy Lyubovich was unveiled on the building of the city gymnasium No. 3 (the former city school) in Zhitomir.

== Sources ==
- State Power of the Soviet Union. Higher Authorities and Management and Their Leaders. 1923–1991. Moscow, 1999
