= People's Commissariat for Communications =

Former communications agency of the Soviet Union

People's Commissariat for Posts and Telegraphs of the USSR
- Народный комиссариат связи СССР (НКС СССР, Наркомсвязь СССР)
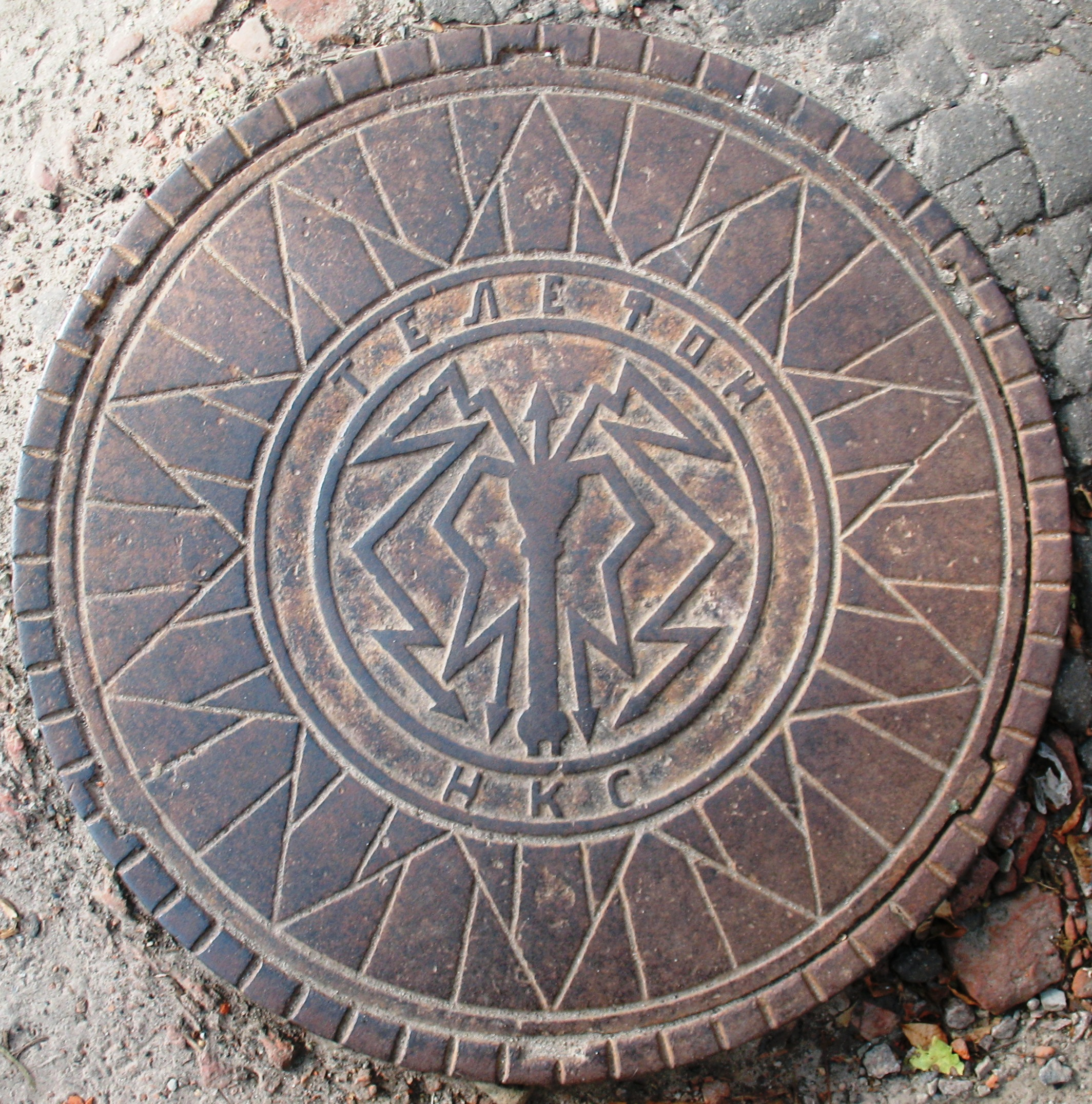
- Official emblem of the Commissariat on a manhole in Kharkov

Agency overview
- Formed: 17 January 1932; 94 years ago
- Preceding agencies: People's Commissariat for Posts and Telegraphs of the RSFSR (since 8 November 1917); People's Commissariat for Posts and Telegraphs of the USSR (since 12 November 1923)
- Dissolved: 15 March 1946; 80 years ago
- Superseding agency: Ministry of Communications of the USSR
- Jurisdiction: Council of People's Commissars
- Headquarters: 7 Gorky Street, Moscow, RSFSR, Soviet Union; 55°45′26″N 37°36′53″E
- Annual budget: varied
- Agency executive: Alexey Rykov (1932–36), People's Commissar for Communications
- Child agency: several

Map
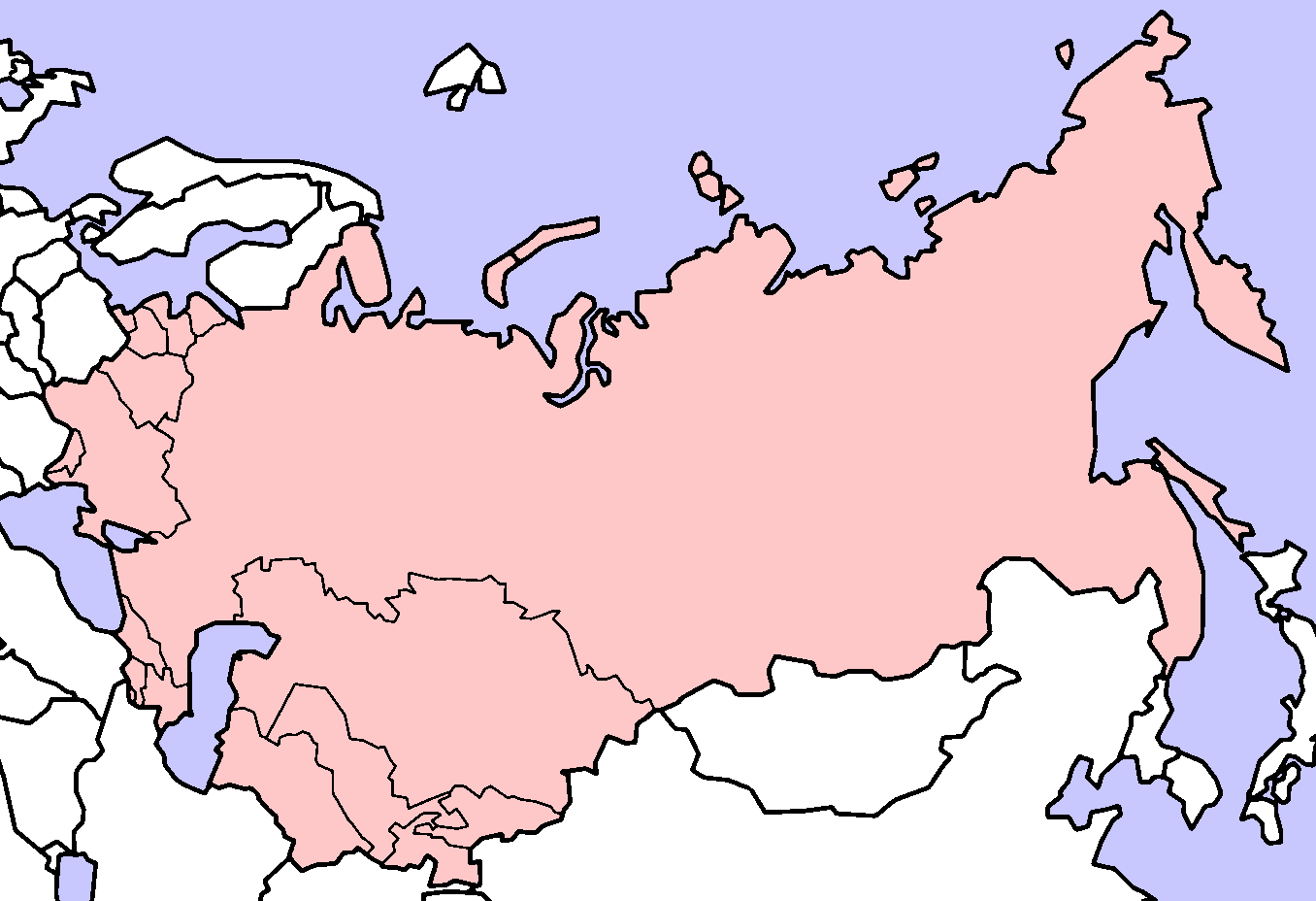
- Union of Soviet Socialist Republics

The People's Commissariat for Communications of the USSR (Russian: Народный комиссариат связи СССР) was the central state agency of the Soviet Union for communications in the period 1932 to 1946. The Commissariat administered the postal, telegraph and telephone services.

== History ==
The Commissariat was organised on 17 January 1932 by renaming from the People's Commissariat for Posts and Telegraphs of the USSR.

Over the years of the pre-World War II five-year plans (1929–1940), there was a rapid development of the Soviet communication system and industry. High-frequency equipment was introduced for long-distance communication. Use of such equipment allowed to transmit three, four, or 12 telephone calls over a pair of wires or 16 telegrams over a single telephone channel. In 1939, construction of a high-frequency three-channel line between Moscow and Khabarovsk (8,600 km) provided dependable communication between the USSR central regions and the Far East. By late 1940, the Moscow Central Telegraph Office had 22 facsimile lines. In 1941, a 12-channel line between Moscow and Leningrad was put into operation that meant the concurrent transmission of 12 telephone calls over a single pair of wires.

In the 1930s, the rural (intraraion) telephone communication was first set up. In 1940, it reached 70% of the areas under rural soviets, 76.3% of the sovkhozes, and 9.2% of the kolkhozes.

The radio broadcasting network experienced significant expansion. In the early 1930s, the Comintern Radio Station, with a power of 500 kW, was constructed along with a number of other stations with a power of 100 kW each. The receiving network was augmented, while a system for wired broadcasting via rebroadcasting centres was arranged. Regular television programming was initiated in 1939.

During the Great Patriotic War of 1941–1945, steady communication was organised between the General Headquarters of the Supreme Command and the fronts. Soviet postal service administered by the People's Commissariat for Communications of the USSR delivered billions of letters via the postal network and the military postal units of the army in the field. Up to 70 million parcels per month were delivered to the Soviet Army front from the rear under extremely difficult and often very dangerous conditions.

Because of the war time, almost half the telephone offices became inoperative but were restored soon after the war. By 1948, telephone system capacity and number of installed telephone sets exceeded the pre-war level.

In the post-war times, mail service had undergone quantitative and qualitative changes. In 1946, the People's Commissariat for Communications of the USSR was transformed into the Ministry of Communications of the USSR.

== Philatelic policy ==
The People's Commissariat for Communications of the USSR was responsible for issuing postage stamps. It also sold stamps to philatelic organisations and collectors. By 1939–1940, the revenue from stamp sales through philatelic organisations was significant. In that same year, it secured over 85% of the total income of the Commissariat (or 17.28 million rubles of 19.833 million rubles). The Soviet government was not an exception among the other states in terms of deriving a profit from the postage stamp trade. In fact, many governments around the world developed similar policies for issuing stamps:

Most stamps, particularly in the 1920s and afterwards, lost their purely postal character in favour of other ends. Some countries began to give philatelic issues their special attention in order to derive a sizable part of the national income from the sale of stamps.

— Carlos Stoetzer, "Postage Stamps as Propaganda", Washington, D.C.: Public Affairs Press,1953, 2.

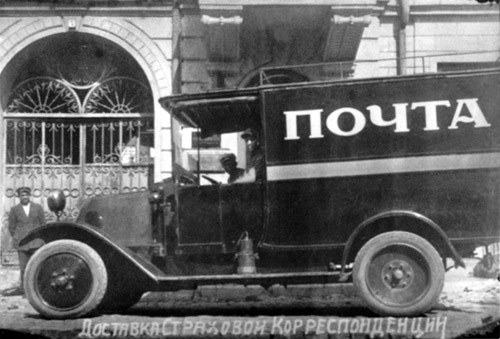
Soviet postal truck in the 1930s

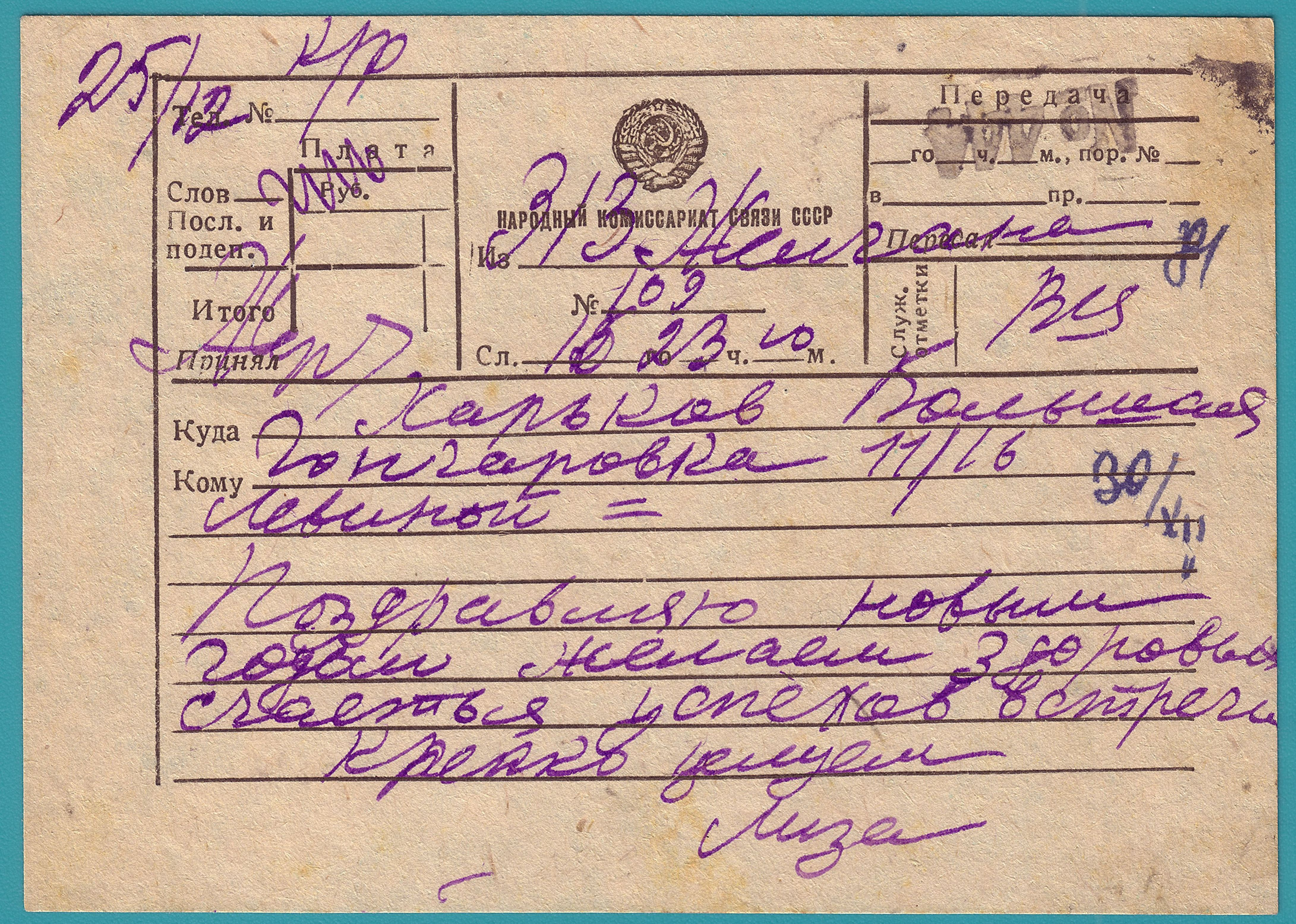
Telegramme of the People's Commissariat for Communications sent to freed Kharkov, 1944

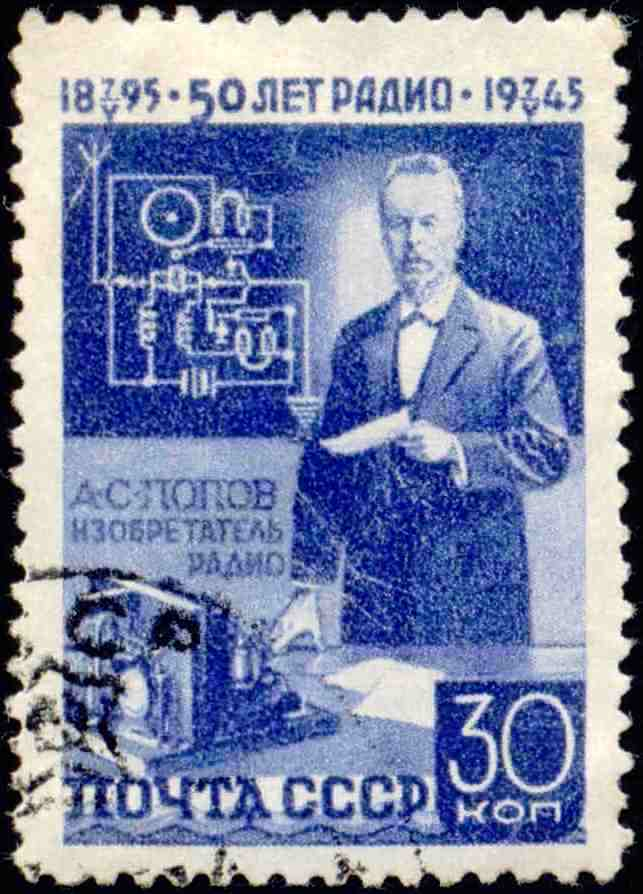
Stamp issued by the People's Commissariat for Communications to commemorate the 50th anniversary of the claimed invention of radio by A.S. Popov, 1945

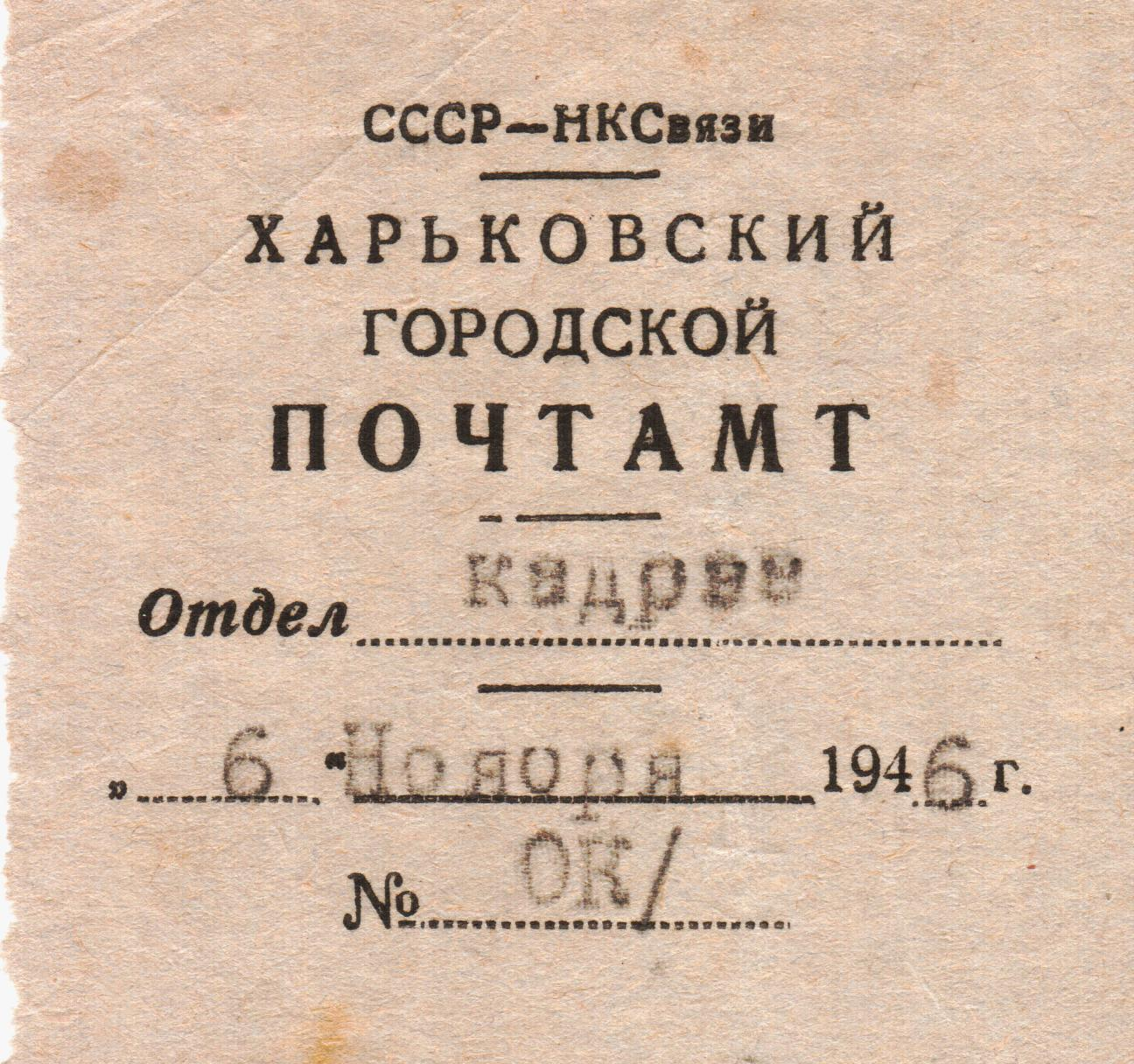
Letterhead of the Kharkov City Post Office, People's Commissariat for Communications, 1946

== List of Commissars ==
Over the years, the Commissariat was headed by the following officers:

People's Commissar for Communications	Term of office
Alexei Rykov	17 January 1932 – 26 September 1936
Genrikh Yagoda	26 September 1936 – 5 April 1937
Innokenty Khalepsky	5 April 1937 – 17 August 1937
Matvei Berman	17 August 1937 – 1 July 1938
(vacant)	1 July 1938 – 7 May 1939
Ivan Peresypkin	10 May 1939 – 20 July 1944
Konstantin Sergeychuk	20 July 1944 – 15 March 1946

== See also ==
- Council of People's Commissars
- International trading tax stamp
- Ministry of Communications (Soviet Union)
- Ministry of Communications and Mass Media of Russia
- People's Commissariat for Posts and Telegraphs of the RSFSR
- Postage stamps and postal history of Russia
- Soviet and post-Soviet postage rates
- Soviet Union stamp catalogue
- Stamps of the Soviet Union
