= Vadim Podbelsky =

- Вадим Подбельский
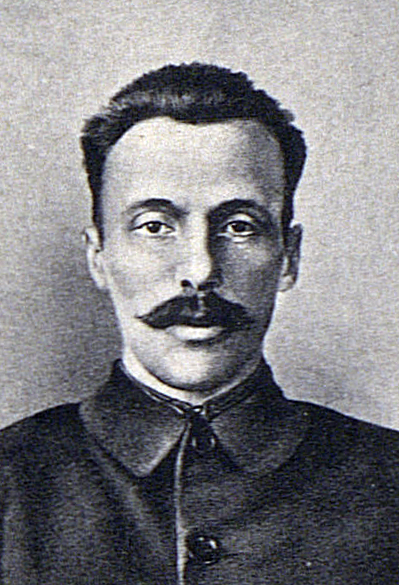
- Podbelsky as depicted on a 1987 Soviet stamp
- Born: November 1887; Yakutia, Russian Empire
- Died: February 25, 1920 (aged 32); Moscow, Russian SFSR
- Resting place: Kremlin Wall Necropolis, Moscow
- Political party: RSDLP (Bolsheviks) (1905–1918); Russian Communist Party (1918–1920)

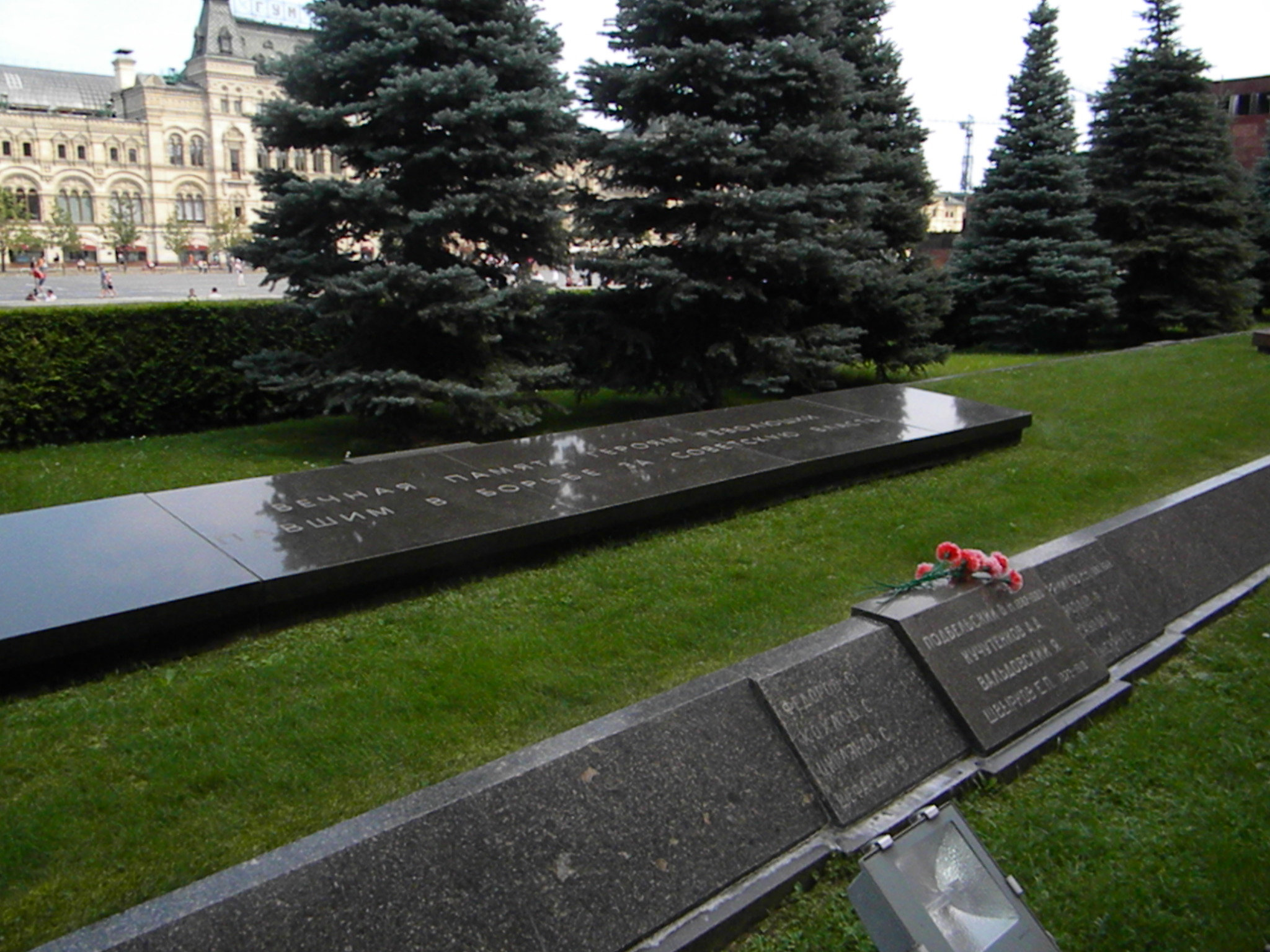
Kremlin Wall Necropolis, Mass Grave No. 4 where also Vadim Podbelsky is buried

Vadim Nikolayevich Podbelsky (Russian: Вади́м Никола́евич Подбе́льский; November 1887 – February 25, 1920) was a Russian revolutionary and Bolshevik politician following the Russian Revolution.

== Early life ==
Born in Yakutia in 1887 to a family of exiled revolutionaries, in the Bagaraz ulus of the Yakutsk province, which might possibly be the city of Boturussky, which is now known as Altantsy. His father, Papiy, was actively involved in the student movement of communists, and he became famous for slapping then Minister of Education, Andrey Saburov, during a university meeting when he was a student of the Faculty of Law. Podbelsky joined the Bolshevik faction of the Russian Social Democratic Labour Party in October 1905 after being arrested for attending a demonstration. During the 1905 uprising he was involved in anti-government demonstrations and meetings. Fearing arrest, Podbelsky fled to France in 1906, but soon after returned to Russia in 1907 illegally to be involved with the Central Committee.

After the October Revolution, he served as the head of the Moscow City Committee. From April 1918 to March 1920 he served as People's Commissariat for Posts and Telegraphs of the RSFSR, where he fought against sabotage of telegraphs and mobilized communications for the needs of defense and reorganized the industry.

Vadim Podbelsky died on February 25, 1920, in Moscow and was buried in Mass Grave No. 4 of the Kremlin Wall Necropolis. His death was caused by running his foot into an old nail during a subbotnik, which resulted in blood poisoning. Former station Ulitsa Podbelskogo on the Moscow Metro was named in his honour.
