= Innokenty Khalepsky =

Russian General

Innokenty Andreyevich Khalepsky
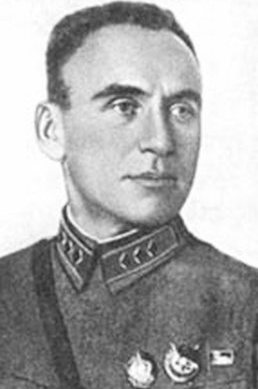
- Khalepsky in 1937

People's Commissar for Communications of the USSR
- In office 5 April 1937 – 17 August 1937
- Preceded by: Genrikh Yagoda
- Succeeded by: Matvei Berman

Personal details
- Born: 14 July 1893 Minusinsk, Yeniseysk Governorate, Russian Empire
- Died: 29 July 1938 (aged 45) Moscow, Soviet Union
- Party: CPSU

Military service
- Allegiance: Soviet Union
- Rank: Komandarm 2nd rank

Innokenty Andreyevich Khalepsky (14 July 1893 – 29 July 1938) was a Soviet general and politician who served as the People's Commissar for Communications of the USSR. He was a recipient of the Order of Lenin and the Order of the Red Banner.

As head of the Department of Mechanization and Motorization, he informed tank designer Semyon Alexandrovich Ginzburg of Poland's acquisition of light infantry and cavalry tanks from the British and French on 26 January 1931. He was one of the 10 individuals promoted to Komandarm 2nd rank on 11 November 1935. During the Great Purge, he was denounced by Dmitry Shmidt, who had taken into custody by the NKVD. While serving as People's Comissar, others who had been denounced by Shmidt including Marshal Mikhail Tukhachevsky, Ieronim Uborevich and Iona Yakir were executed. He was removed from his post, arrested and later executed himself.

Preceded by Genrikh Yagoda	People's Commissar for Communications of the USSR; 5 April – 17 August 1937	Succeeded by Matvei Berman

== Bibliography ==
- Bolshaya Sovietskaya Encyclopedia t. 28 Moscow 1978.
- http://www.sakharov-center.ru/asfcd/martirolog/?t=page&id=14861 (ros.)
