= Ivan Peresypkin =

Soviet communications officer (1904–1978)

- Иван Пересыпкин
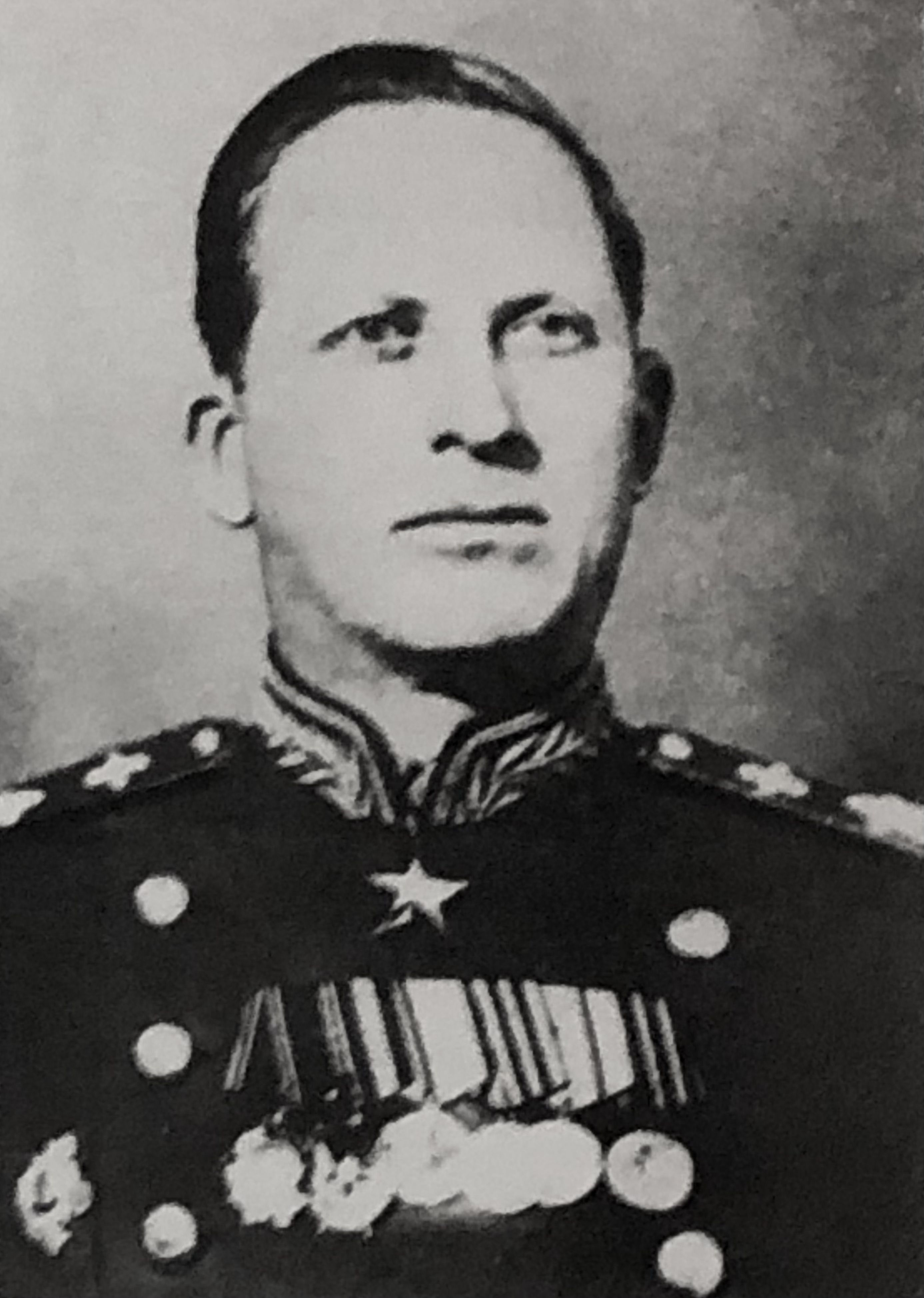

Minister of Communications of the Soviet Union
- In office 10 May 1939 – 20 July 1944
- Prime Minister: Joseph Stalin
- Preceded by: Matvei Berman
- Succeeded by: Konstantin Sergeychuk

Personal details
- Born: 5 June 1904 Gorlivka, Bakhmut uezd, Russian Empire
- Died: 12 October 1978 (aged 74) Moscow, Soviet Union
- Resting place: Novodevichye Cemetery
- Party: CPSU

Military service
- Allegiance: Soviet Union
- Branch/service: Red Army
- Rank: Marshal of Signal Troops
- Unit: Signal Troops
- Commands: Signal Troops
- Battles/wars: Russian Civil War; Great Patriotic War

Ivan Terentyevich Peresypkin (Russian: Ива́н Тере́нтьевич Пересы́пкин; June 5, 1904 – October 12, 1978) was a Soviet General, statesman and wartime leader.

== Biography ==
He was born in the city of Horlivka, Bakhmut uezd (now in the Donetsk region) to a mercury mine worker. Soon after his birth, he was taken to live with relatives in the village of Protasovo in the Maloarkhangelsky Uyezd of the Oryol Governorate. In 1916, he completed a four-year public school. From 1916, he worked at the Novomoskovsk mine in the Donbass (in the city of Horlivka).

In April 1919, he joined the Red Army and during the Russian Civil War he fought in the Southern Front. In 1920, he was discharged into the reserves as a minor and worked in the railway police, a mine, and a factory.

In 1923, he returned to the Red Army. In 1924, he graduated from the Military-Political School of the Kiev Military District. He became a member of the Communist Party of the Soviet Union in 1925. From 1925, he served in the communications squadron of the 1st Cavalry Division: squadron political instructor, squadron military commissar, and commander of a separate communications squadron. In 1932, he was sent to study at the academy. In 1937, he graduated from the Military Electrical Engineering Academy of the Red Army. That same year, he was appointed military commissar of the Red Army Communications Research Institute. From January 1938, he became military commissar of the Red Army Communications Directorate, at which time he was promoted to colonel. From March 1939, he became deputy head of the Red Army Communications Directorate under Ivan Naidyonov.

He was the People's Commissar of Communications of the USSR from May 1939 to July 1944. On 23 July 1941, he was appointed Chief of Red Army Signals Forces, in addition. He was also Deputy People's Commissar of Defence of the USSR. From November 1944, he was chief of the Main Communication Directorate of the Red Army and Marshal of the signal troops. During the war, he displayed talent for military leadership. He did a great amount of work ensuring stable communications between the Supreme Command Headquarters, the General Staff, and the combat army. He made a tangible contribution to the development and manufacture of various communications devices and helped supply them to the front. He was a member of the second convocation of the Supreme Soviet of the Soviet Union.

== Awards ==
He was awarded many orders and medals over the course of his career:

- Order of Lenin (four times)
- Order of the October Revolution
- Order of the Red Banner (two times)
- Order of Kutuzov
- Order of the Red Star
- Order "For Service to the Homeland in the Armed Forces of the USSR"
- Jubilee Medal "In Commemoration of the 100th Anniversary of the Birth of Vladimir Ilyich Lenin"
- Medal "For the Defence of Moscow"
- Medal "For the Defence of Stalingrad"
- Medal "For the Victory over Germany in the Great Patriotic War 1941–1945"
- Jubilee Medal "Twenty Years of Victory in the Great Patriotic War 1941–1945"
- Jubilee Medal "Thirty Years of Victory in the Great Patriotic War 1941–1945"
- Medal "For the Victory over Japan"
- Medal "Veteran of the Armed Forces of the USSR"
- Jubilee Medal "XX Years of the Workers' and Peasants' Red Army"
- Jubilee Medal "30 Years of the Soviet Army and Navy"
- Jubilee Medal "40 Years of the Armed Forces of the USSR"
- Jubilee Medal "50 Years of the Armed Forces of the USSR"
- Jubilee Medal "60 Years of the Armed Forces of the USSR"
- Medal "In Commemoration of the 800th Anniversary of Moscow"
- Order of Polonia Restituta (Polish People's Republic)
- Order of the Cross of Grunwald (Polish People's Republic)
- Order of People's Liberation (Yugoslavia)
- Order of the Partisan Star (Yugoslavia)
- Order of the Red Banner (Mongolian People's Republic)
- Medal "For the Victory over Japan" (Mongolian People's Republic)
- Medal "30 years of the Victory in Khalkhin-Gol"
- Medal "30 Years of Victory over Militarist Japan" (Mongolian People's Republic)
- Medal "50th Anniversary of the Mongolian People's Army"
- Medal of Sino-Soviet Friendship
- Medal "For Strengthening Friendship in Arms" (Czechoslovakia)
