= Ivan Smirnov (politician) =

Russian revolutionary (1881–1936)

- Иван Смирнов
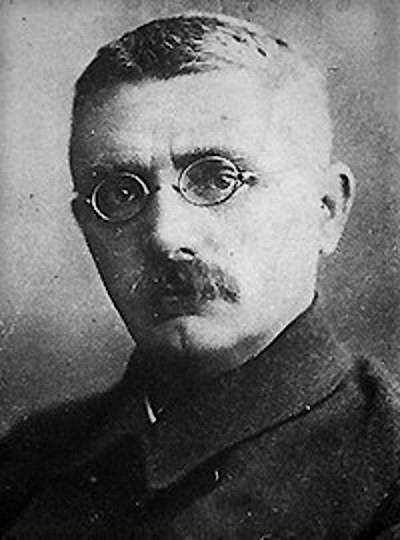

1st People's Commissar for Posts and Telegraphs
- In office 6 July 1923 – 12 November 1927
- Preceded by: Office established
- Succeeded by: Artemy Lyubovich

Personal details
- Born: January 1881 Moscow, Russian Empire
- Died: 25 August 1936 (aged 55) Moscow, Soviet Union
- Resting place: Donskoye Cemetery
- Citizenship: Soviet
- Party: CPSU
- Spouse(s): A. N. Safonova; Varvara Yakovleva
- Children: 4

Ivan Nikitich Smirnov (Russian: Иван Никитич Смирнов; January 1881 – 25 August 1936) was a Russian Bolshevik revolutionary, Soviet politician and Communist Party functionary. A prominent member of the Left Opposition, he allegedly led a secret Trotskyist opposition group in the Soviet Union during the Stalin period. He was arrested in 1933 and shot during the Great Purge.

== Political life ==
He was born in Gorodishche, Penza Governorate in a peasant family of Russian ethnicity.

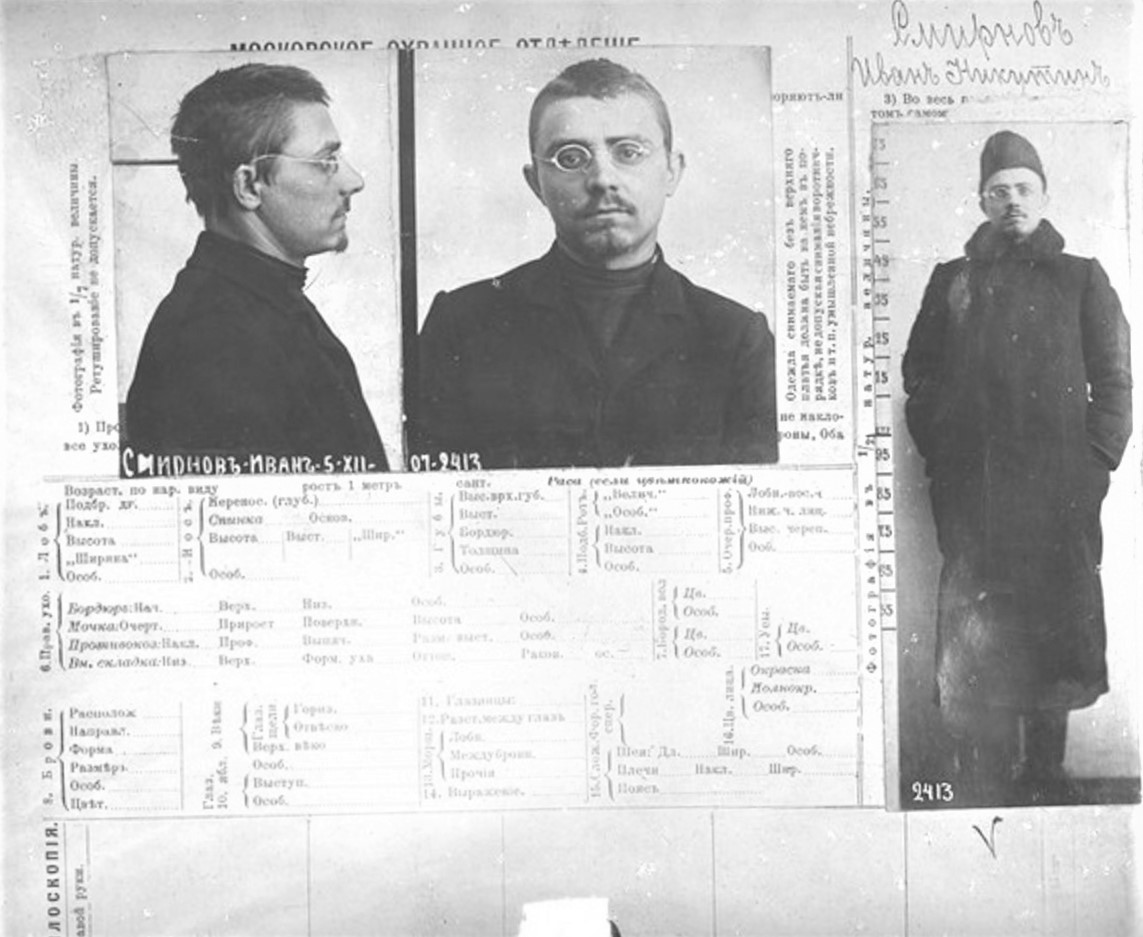
Smirnov's Okhrana file

In 1899, Smirnov joined the Russian Social Democratic Labour Party and became a Bolshevik. He led Party activity in Moscow, Saint Petersburg, Vyshniy Volochok, Rostov, Kharkov, and Tomsk. Smirnov was subject to repeated arrests. In 1916, he was called up for army service in a reserve regiment in Tomsk. In 1917, he became a member of the executive committee of the Tomsk Soviet. In August of the same year, Smirnov was one of the organizers and managers of the Bolshevist publishing house "Volna" (Wave) in Moscow. He was a deputy of the Constituent Assembly. During the Russian Civil War, Smirnov was a member of the Revolutionary Military Council of the Eastern Front (August 1918–April 1919), and the 5th Army (April 1919–May 1920). Smirnov played a pivotal role in defeating the army of Alexander Kolchak during the war, and in the subsequent execution of Kolchak on 7 February 1920.

In 1920–1923, Smirnov was a member of the Executive Committee of the Russian Communist Party (Bolsheviks). At the same time, he chaired the Siberian Revolutionary Committee and was a member of the Siberian bureau of the Party. Smirnov was known to have had close ties with the Cheka. Smirnov's second wife, Varvara Yakovleva, was a Cheka officer and the deputy head of the Petrograd Cheka. Smirnov administered massacres of armed rebellious peasants in Tyumen and the Altai Mountains, and was the man who organized the capture of General Roman von Ungern-Sternberg in 1921. In 1921–1922, Smirnov was a secretary of the Petrograd Committee and Northwestern Bureau of the Executive Committee of the Party. He was the closest associate of Grigory Zinoviev at the time. Smirnov took part in mass executions and deportations from Petrograd of people of the "exploiter class".

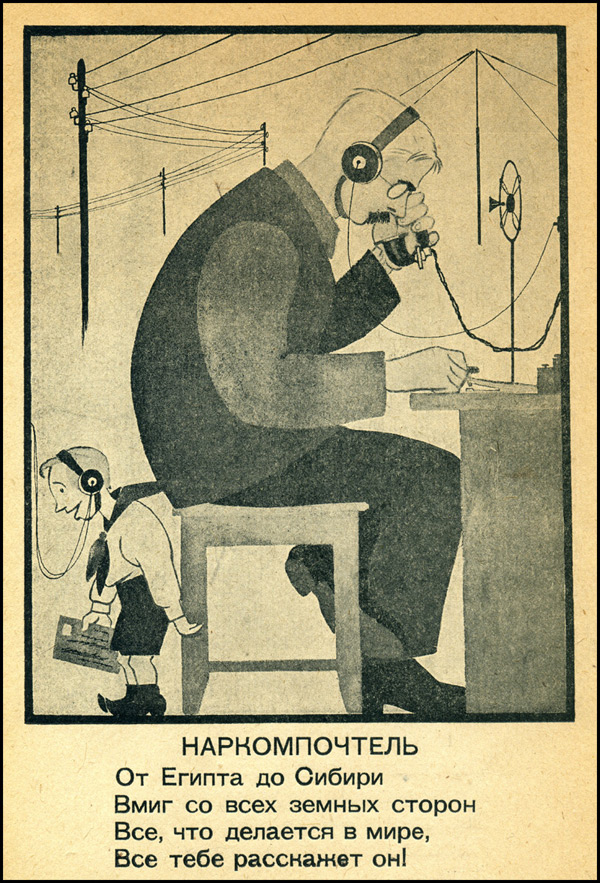
Caricature of Smirnov from the series "Your People's Commissars at Home" c. 1923–1927

From April 1922 through July 1923, Smirnov was a member of the Presidium of the Supreme Soviet of the National Economy (ВСНХ) of the RSFSR; from September 1922 through May 1923, its deputy chairman. In July 1923, Smirnov was appointed People's Commissar for Posts and Telegraph.

In 1923, Smirnov became an active member of the Trotskyist opposition. In October 1923, Smirnov signed "The Declaration of 46", which attacked by implication the influence of Joseph Stalin as General Secretary of the Party. After Lenin's death in 1924, Smirnov publicly demanded removal of Stalin as General Secretary, but Stalin kept his position.

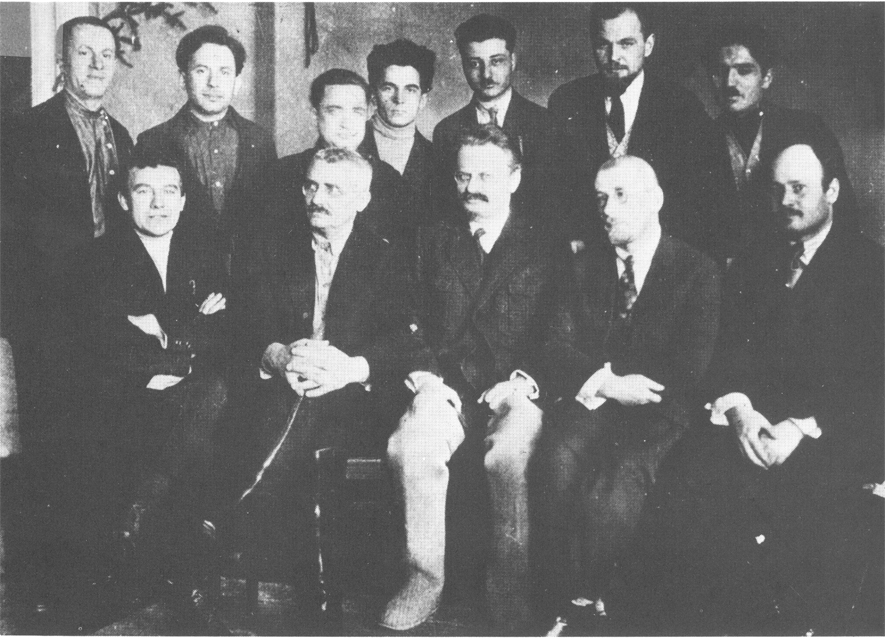
Members of Trotsky's Left Opposition, 1927. Smirnov is the second to the left, seated next to Trotsky

In 1927, Smirnov signed the "Declaration of the Eighty-three", another anti-Stalin manifesto. Stalin now moved against him. On 11 November 1927, Smirnov was removed from his Post and Telegraph position. A month later, he was expelled from the Party by the 15th Party Congress. On 31 December 1927, Smirnov was sentenced to three years of internal exile by the OGPU Board.

In October 1929, Smirnov "broke with Trotskyism" and was reinstated in the Party in May 1930. In 1929–1932, he was director of Saratovkombainstroy, the Combine harvester assembly plant in Saratov. In 1932, Smirnov was appointed head of the Department of Erection of New Buildings at the People's Commissariat of Heavy Industry.

On 14 January 1933, Smirnov was arrested by the OGPU, and a month later was again expelled from the Party, accused of forming an "anti-party group" in order to remove Stalin. Historian Pierre Broué showed that by the end of 1932 Smirnov had joined a clandestine bloc which Trotsky characterized as an alliance to fight Stalinist repression.

On 14 April 1933, he was sentenced to five years in labor camps. Some of those arrested and sentenced to various terms of imprisonment soon repented once again and were “forgiven” by Stalin — until 1936. Ivan Smirnov himself, sentenced to 5 years of imprisonment, did not write any more statements of repentance and was held in the Suzdal Special Purpose Prison until, in August 1936, he was brought to the First Moscow Trial together with Mrachkovsky, Ter-Vaganyan and Goltsman — in the case of the so-called “anti-Soviet united Trotskyist-Zinoviev center” which had been defeated back in early 1933, had now, in retrospect, turned into a terrorist “center” that organized the murder of Kirov in December 1934, and then a number of failed assassination attempts. According to Alexander Orlov, close relatives of the defendants were a reliable tool of blackmail for the investigators, and, in particular, Smirnov’s ex-wife, A. N. Safonova, begged him to take part in the judicial farce, as she, in turn, feared for the fate of her children.

The Military Collegium of the Supreme Court of the Soviet Union sentenced him to death on 24 August 1936, and he was executed the next day. He was buried in a mass grave at the Donskoye Cemetery. Smirnov was rehabilitated in 1988.

It is clear.. that Trotsky did have a clandestine organization inside the USSR in this period and that he maintained communication with it. It is equally clear that a united oppositional bloc was formed in 1932. [...] From the available evidence, it seems that Trotsky envisioned no “terrorist” role for the bloc, although his call for a “new political revolution” to remove “the cadres, the bureaucracy” might well have been so interpreted in Moscow. There is also reason to believe that after the decapitation of the bloc through the removal of Zinoviev, Kamenev, Smirnov, and others the organization comprised mainly lower-level less prominent oppositionists: followers of Zinoviev, with whom Trotsky attempted to maintain direct contact. It is equally probable that the NKVD knew about the bloc. Trotsky’s and Sedov’s staffs were thoroughly infiltrated, and Sedov’s closest collaborator in 1936, Mark Zborowski, is said to have been an NKVD agent. In 1936, the 1932 bloc would be interpreted by the NKVD as a terrorist plot and would form the original pretext for Ezhov’s campaign to destroy the former opposition. Smirnov, Gol’tsman, Zinoviev, Kamenev, and Trotsky (in absentia) would be the defendants at the 1936 show trial, and the 1932 events would form the evidential basis for their prosecution.
