= Russian Bureau of Philately =

Russian Bureau of Philately (RBF)
- Российское бюро филателии (РБФ)
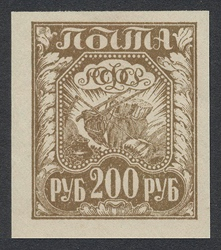
- RSFSR definitive stamp issued by the RBF order, 1921

Agency overview
- Formed: 26 September 1921; 104 years ago
- Dissolved: November 1924; 101 years ago
- Superseding agency: Organisation of the Commissioner for Philately and Scripophily
- Jurisdiction: Council of People's Commissars of the RSFSR
- Headquarters: Moscow, USSR; 55°45′N 37°37′E
- Agency executives: A. V. Musatov (1922–24), Chairman; A. Ziskind (1921–22), Chairman
- Parent agency: People's Commissariat for Posts and Telegraphs of the RSFSR

Russian Bureau of Philately (RBF; Russian: Росси́йское бюро́ филатели́и (РБФ)) was a special organisation under the People's Commissariat for Posts and Telegraphs of the RSFSR in 1921–1924. This was the first Soviet government agency in charge of all matters of the organisation and development of philately.

== History ==
Soon after the Russian Civil War, Soviet governmental institutions were set up to conduct the activities and practices in the field of philately. In 1921, the People's Commissariat for Posts and Telegraphs of the RSFSR (Narkompochtel) founded a special organ, the Russian Bureau of Philately (RBF). It was aimed at dealing with all questions regarding the organisation and development of philately in Soviet Russia.

In 1921, a Narkompochtel representative Feodor Chuchin worked within the RBF and proposed change in the philatelic policy. According to this proposal, the monopoly on foreign trade should have been extended and included the traffic in postage stamps, the revenue being used to aid street children. In 1922, Chuchin was appointed to head the Organisation of the Commissioner for Philately and Scripophily.

In 1922, the Russian Bureau of Philately at the RSFSR People's Commissariat for Posts and Telegraphs supported an idea of establishing a new philatelic society, All-Russian Society of Philatelists.

At some point, the RBF aided in issuing stamps of Soviet Russia and the Ukrainian Soviet Socialist Republic.

In 1924, the RBF was closed and its functions were transferred to the Organisation of the Commissioner for Philately and Scripophily.

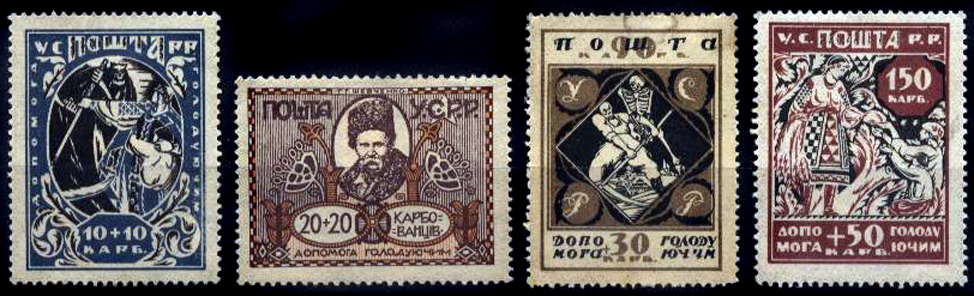
Semi-postal stamps of the Ukrainian Soviet Socialist Republic issued with assistance of the RBF, 1923

== See also ==
- All-Russian Society of Philatelists
- First All-Union Philatelic Exhibition
- Leniniana (philately)
- Moscow Society of Philatelists and Collectors
- Organisation of the Commissioner for Philately and Scripophily
- People's Commissariat for Posts and Telegraphs of the RSFSR
- Philatelic International
- Soviet Philatelic Association
- Soviet Philatelist
