= Moscow Municipal Society of Collectors =

Moscow Municipal Society of Philatelists
- Московское городское общество коллекционеров
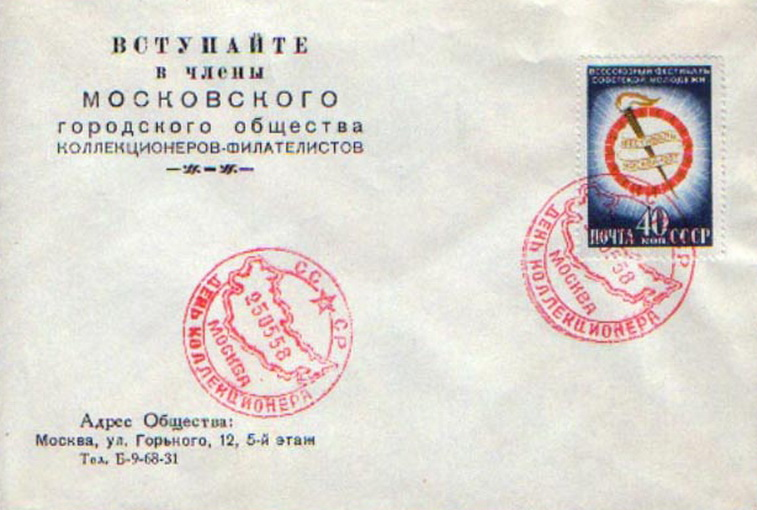
- Cover of the Society with a special cancellation commemorating the Day of Collector, a handstamp calling to become members of the organisation, and contact information, 1958
- Abbreviation: Russian: МГОК (MGOK)
- Predecessor: Moscow Society of Philatelists and Collectors
- Merged into: All-Union Society of Philatelists
- Successor: Union of Moscow Philatelists
- Formation: May 31, 1957; 69 years ago
- Founded at: Moscow, USSR
- Dissolved: 1966; 60 years ago
- Merger of: USSR regional philatelic associations
- Type: NGO
- Legal status: municipal association
- Purpose: philately, numismatics, ex-libris collection, other forms of collecting
- Headquarters: 12 Gorky Street
- Location: Moscow, USSR
- Coordinates: 55°45′50″N 37°36′23″E
- Region served: Moscow, other USSR regions
- Members: over 4500 members (1964)
- Official language: Russian
- Chairman: Leonid L. Lepeshinsky
- Main organ: Board of the Society; Publication: Sovetskii Kollektsioner
- Remarks: private persons
- Formerly called: Moscow Municipal Society of Collectors-Philatelists

Moscow Municipal Society of Philatelists (Russian: Московское городское общество коллекционеров) was a regional philatelic organisation in the Soviet Union established in Moscow in 1957. Later on, it was merged into the All-Union Society of Philatelists (Russian: Всесоюзное общество филателистов).

== History ==
The first Soviet philatelic organisation, Moscow Society of Philatelists and Collectors, was founded in 1918 in Moscow, and the All-Russian Society of Philatelists was established in 1923.

In the 1940s, because of the Great Patriotic War, the organised philatelic movement in the USSR ceased. Only in separate cities, there were circles and clubs. In the 1950s, philatelic associations began appearing in many cities around the country.

The Moscow Municipal Society of Collectors, nowadays the Union of Moscow Philatelists, was created in 1957. In 1963, it started publishing the annual Sovetskii Kollektsioner (Soviet Collector).

In March 1966, the All-Union Society of Philatelists was founded. It evolved from the Moscow Municipal Society of Collectors and a range of philatelic associations in other cities of the country. These associations became regional members of the All-Union Society of Philatelists, subsequently the Union of Philatelists of the USSR. The latter functioned until 1992.

== See also ==
- All-Russian Society of Philatelists
- Filateliya
- First All-Union Philatelic Exhibition
- Kollektsioner
- Leniniana (philately)
- Organisation of the Commissioner for Philately and Scripophily
- Philatelic International
- Soviet Philatelic Association
- Soviet Philatelist
