= Pochtovo-Telegrafnyi Zhurnal =

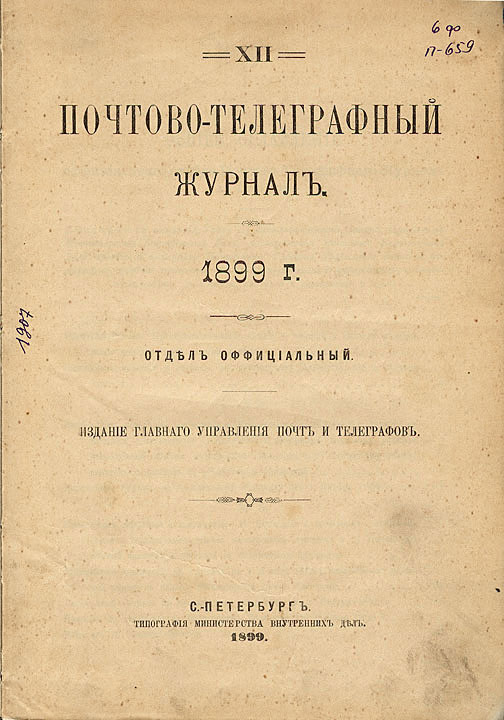
- Cover of a magazine issue (official section), Volume 12, 1899
- Editor: Nikolai Slavinsky (1888–1911)
- Categories: Postal service, telegraphy
- Frequency: 24 times a year (1888–1892) since 1893, weekly (official section) & monthly (unofficial section)
- Format: 26 cm
- Circulation: 8,000 (initially)
- Paid circulation: ~400
- Founded: 1888; 137 years ago
- Final issue: 1919; 106 years ago
- Company: Chief Directorate of Posts and Telegraphs (1888–1916); Ministry of Posts and Telegraphs (1917); People's Commissariat for Posts and Telegraphs of the RSFSR (1918–1919)
- Country: Russian Empire (1888–1916); Russian Republic (1917); RSFSR (1918–1919)
- Based in: St. Petersburg; Moscow
- Language: Russian
- OCLC: 33662618

Pochtovo-Telegrafnyi Zhurnal (Russian: Почтово-телеграфный журнал; Post and Telegraph Journal) was an official magazine of the Russian postal authorities between 1888 and 1919.

== History ==
The magazine was published in St. Petersburg from 1888 to 1916 by the Chief Directorate of Posts and Telegraphs of the Russian Empire. In 1917, it was issued in Petrograd by the Ministry of Posts and Telegraphs of the Russian Provisional Government.

In 1918 and 1919, Pochtovo-Telegrafnyi Zhurnal became the official organ of the People's Commissariat for Posts and Telegraphs of the RSFSR and was published in Moscow.

== Content ==
Pochtovo-Telegrafnyi Zhurnal had two sections, official and unofficial. The official section contained:

- orders,
- directives,
- postal rates,
- other departmental materials.

The unofficial section included articles on the history and state of the postal, telegraph, and telephone services in Russia.

In 1888–1892, two sections were printed together and 24 times a year. Later on, the official section appeared weekly, whereas the unofficial section was published monthly.

== See also ==
- A.S. Popov Central Museum of Communications
- Filateliya
- Kollektsioner
- List of philatelic magazines
- People's Commissariat for Posts and Telegraphs of the RSFSR
- Postage stamps and postal history of Russia
- Soviet Philatelist
- The Post Office Electrical Engineers' Journal
