= People's Commissariat for Posts and Telegraphs of the RSFSR =

Soviet government agency (1917–1923)

- Народный комиссариат почт и телеграфов РСФСР (НКПТ, НКПиТ, Наркомпочтель РСФСР)
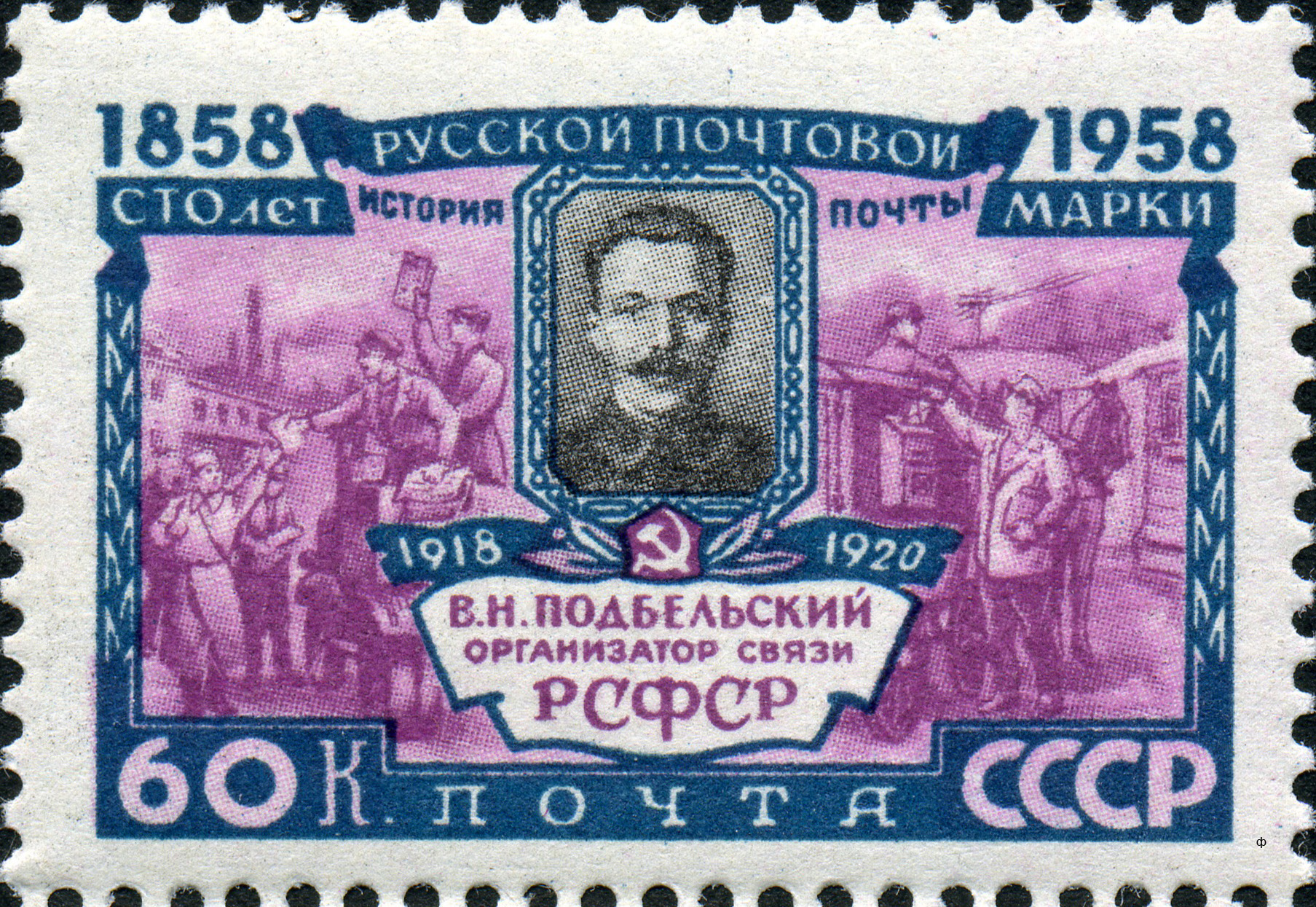
- Vadim Podbelsky, the 3rd People's Commissar for Posts and Telegraphs and organiser of communications in the RSFSR, on a USSR stamp showing postal operation scenes

Agency overview
- Formed: 8 November 1917; 108 years ago
- Preceding agency: Ministry of Posts and Telegraphs of the Russian Provisional Government (since 5 May 1917)
- Dissolved: 12 November 1923; 102 years ago
- Superseding agency: People's Commissariat for Posts and Telegraphs of the USSR
- Jurisdiction: Council of People's Commissars
- Headquarters: Moscow, RSFSR; 55°45′N 37°37′E
- Annual budget: varied
- Agency executive: Nikolai Glebov-Avilov (1917), People's Commissar for Posts and Telegraphs
- Child agency: several

People's Commissariat for Posts and Telegraphs of the RSFSR, known shortly as the Narkompochtel, was the central organ of government of the RSFSR that was in charge of the organisation and development of the different forms of communication, including postal service. It was founded in Petrograd on 7 November [O.S. 25 October] 1917 from the Russian Ministry of Posts and Telegraphs and retained its organisational structure.

== History ==
On 7 November [O.S. 25 October] 1917 the Bolsheviks came to power in Russia and set up the Council of People's Commissars. The Council took control of the former Ministry of Posts and Telegraphs. On 9 November [O.S. 27 October] 1917, the People's Commissar for Posts and Telegraphs issued a decree dissolving the former administration, which also concluded:

I declare that no so-called initiatory groups or committees for the administration of the department of Posts and Telegraphs can usurp the functions belonging to the central power and to me as People's Commissar.

After the October Revolution of 1917, the Soviet government undertook a number of measures for establishing the socialist organisation of communications. In 1917 and 1918, there was nationalisation of the means of communication that were given the jurisdiction of the People’s Commissariat for Posts and Telegraphs. On 16 April 1918, the Council of People’s Commissars issued a decree that was signed by V. I. Lenin. The document laid the foundations for setting up the postal and telegraph department. According to another decree, of 21 November 1918, post offices became responsible for the distribution of Soviet periodicals in addition to the delivery of letters.

In 1918 and 1919, the Commissariat's official publication was Pochtovo-Telegrafnyi Zhurnal (Russian: Почтово-телеграфный журнал; Post and Telegraph Journal).

Following a Lenin's proposal, a resolution of the Council of People’s Commissars in January 1921 initiated the organisation of radiotelephone offices. In 1922, the Supreme Soviet of the National Economy set up the Electrotechnical Trust for Weak-current Plants. The trust supervised the operation of enterprises that were engaged in production of communication equipment. In the same year, the world’s first radio broadcast station was opened in Moscow; its power was 12 kilowatts.

In the early 1920s, use of airplanes began for transporting mail.

On 12 November 1923, the Commissariat was replaced with the People's Commissariat for Posts and Telegraphs of the USSR.

== Philatelic policy ==
The early Soviet government organised production and distribution of postage stamps of the RSFSR. Official state policy toward philately and collector's organisations included both financial and propagandistic aims. To carry out this policy, the Commissariat organised the Russian Bureau of Philately.

Similar to other governments in the world, the Soviet authorities considered stamp collectors as a source of revenue for various relief funds. For example, in December 1921 four semi-postal stamps were produced by the State Printers. They had denominations of 2,250 rubles, of which 2,000 rubles contributed to famine aid.

RSFSR stamps of a 1921 Pomgol famine relief issue

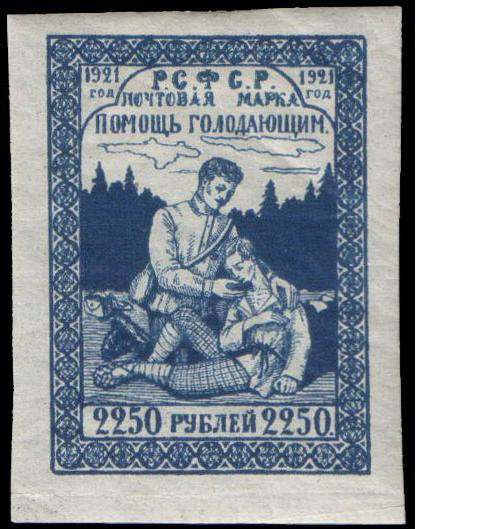

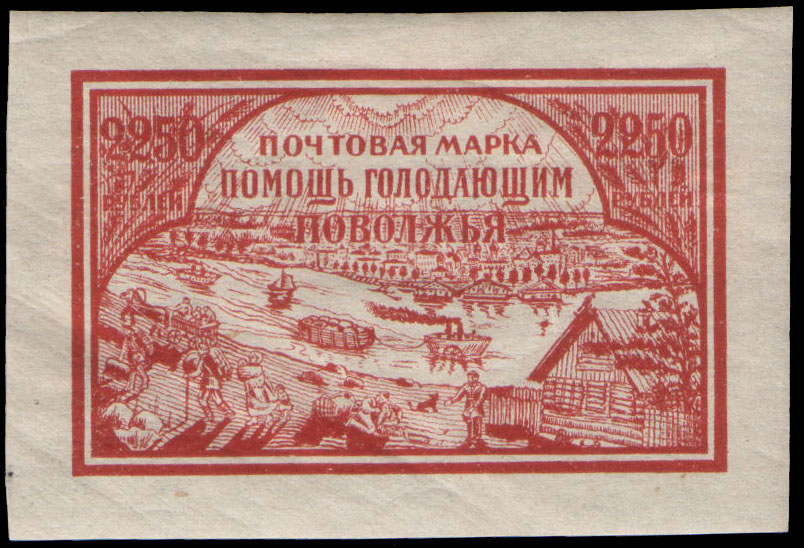

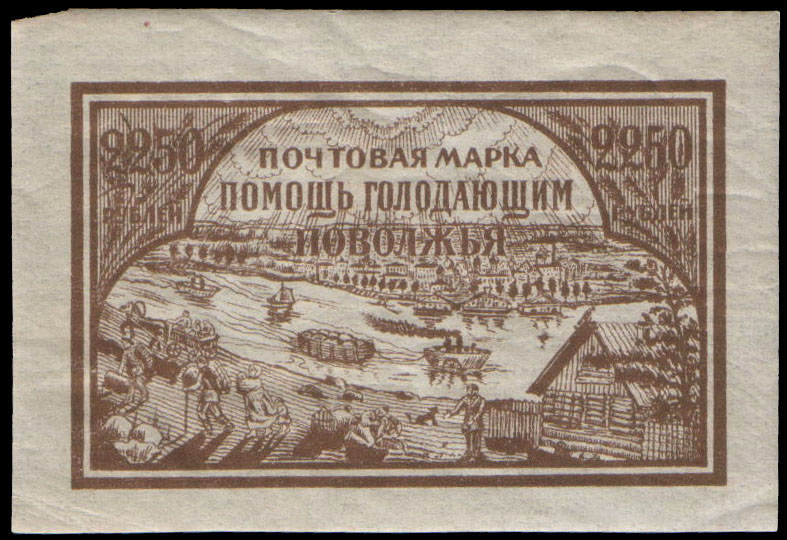

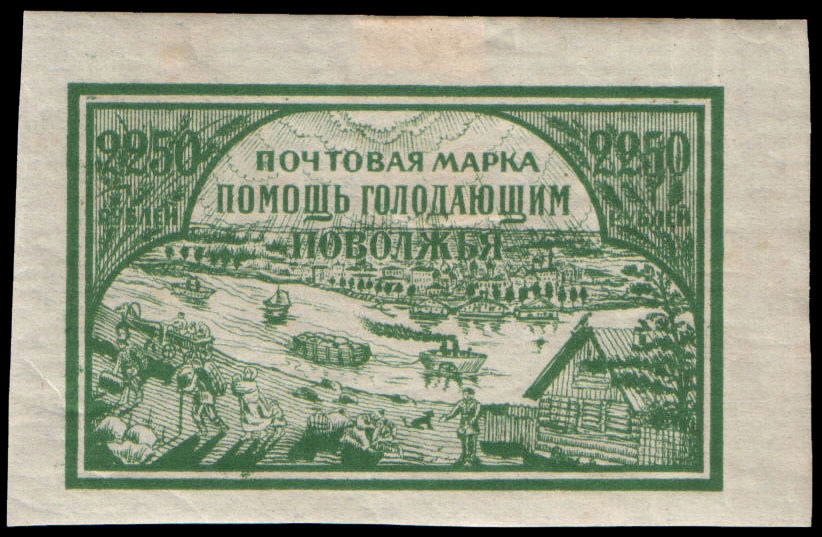

On 19 August 1922, the Commissioner for Philately and Scripophily Feodor Chuchin held a one-day philatelic event, Philately for Children. The event raised 344,535 rubles.

Russian Empire stamps overprinted with the inscription ″Philately for Children″, 19 August 1922

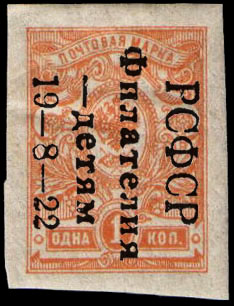

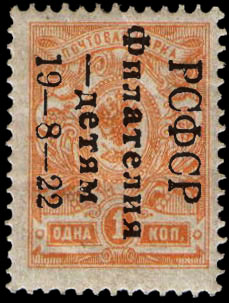

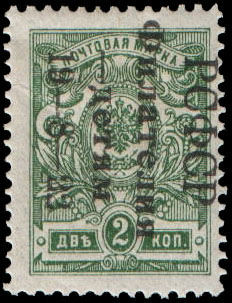

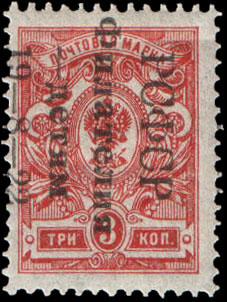

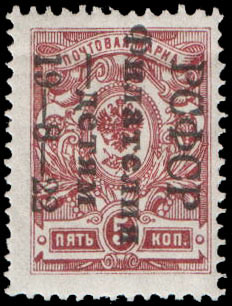

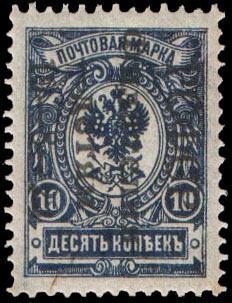

State monopoly in selling and exporting stamps turned out profitable as demonstrated by sales figures. Overall, famine relief was financed with 2.97 million rubles obtained from stamp sales in 1922 between April 1 and December 1. Around 97% of the stamp sales were arranged abroad. As reported to the Central Executive Committee, 310,287 of the 320,432 stamps were sold through the official monopoly office in Mannheim, Germany.

In 1923, on the occasion of International Workers' Day, another philatelic event was organised that appealed to stamp collectors. Stamps overprinted with the inscription "Philately for Workers" were made by the government and sold for only one day in Moscow.

RSFSR stamps overprinted with the inscription ″Philately for Workers″, 1 May 1923

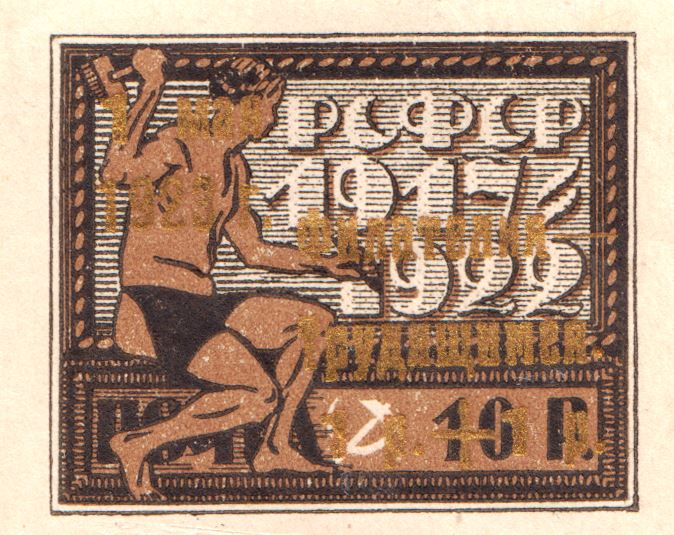
Gold overprint

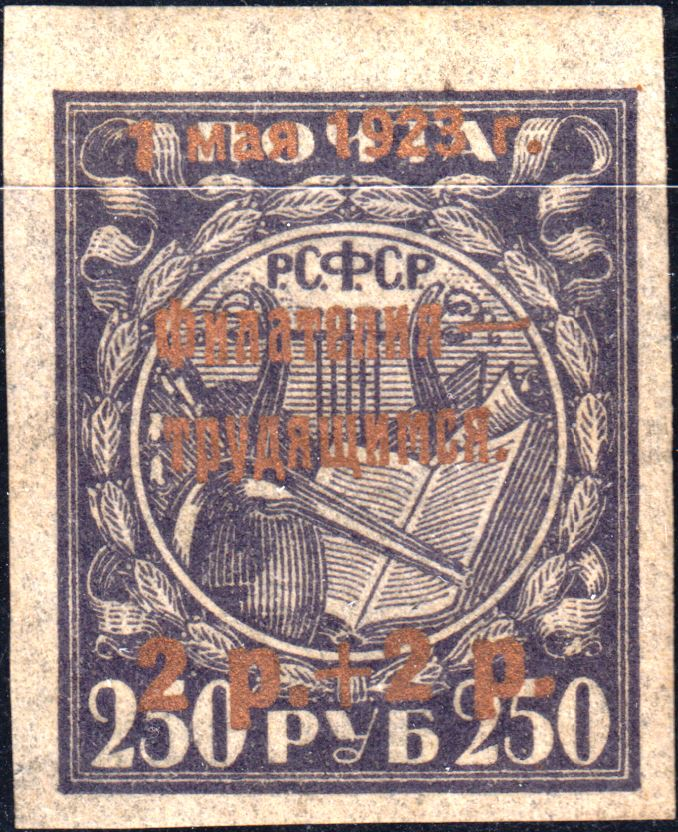
Bronze overprint

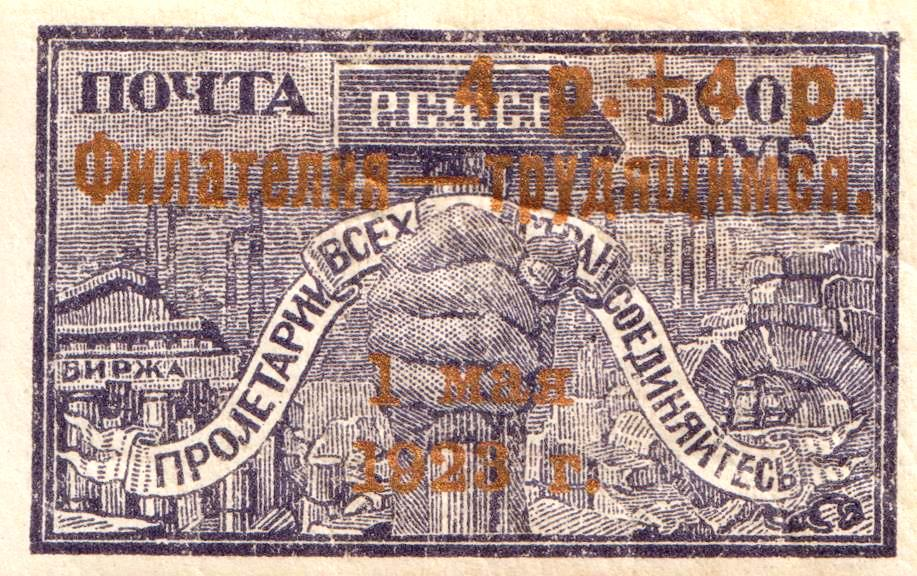
Bronze overprint

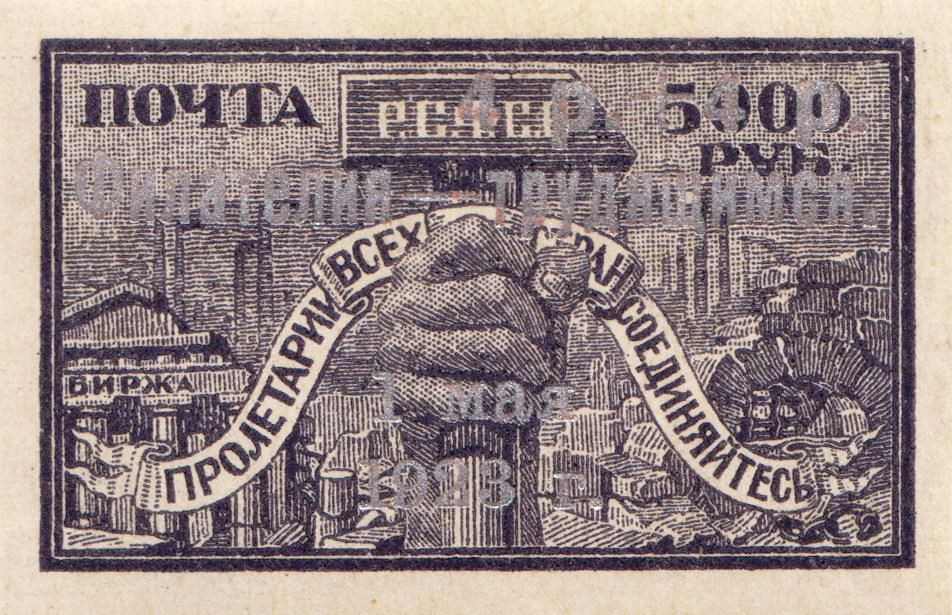
Silver overprint

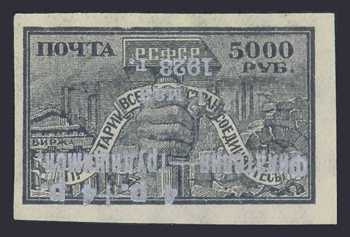
Silver overprint invert

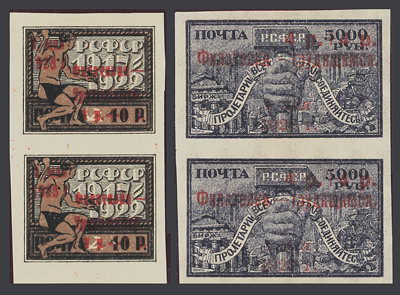
Red overprint

== List of chiefs ==
The first Commissar was Nikolai Glebov-Avilov, who sat on Sovnarkom in 1917. After that, the post was taken up by four other officers:

People's Commissar for Posts and Telegraphs	Term of office
Nikolai Glebov-Avilov	8 November 1917 – 23 December 1917
Prosh Proshyan	23 December 1917 – 11 March 1918
Vadim Podbelsky	11 March 1918 – 1 March 1920
Artemi Lyubovitsh	1 March 1920 – 1 January 1921
Valerian Dovgalevsky	1 January 1921 – 12 November 1923

== See also ==
- Council of People's Commissars
- International trading tax stamp
- Organisation of the Commissioner for Philately and Scripophily
- People's Commissariat for Communications of the USSR
- Postage stamps and postal history of Russia
- Soviet and post-Soviet postage rates
- Soviet Union stamp catalogue
- Stamps of the Soviet Union
