= Soviet Philatelic Association =

- Советская филателистическая ассоциация (СФА)

Agency overview
- Formed: 25 October 1926; 99 years ago
- Preceding agency: Organisation of the Commissioner for Philately and Scripophily
- Dissolved: 1938; 88 years ago
- Superseding agency: Chief Philatelic Bureau
- Jurisdiction: VTsIK
- Headquarters: Moscow, USSR; 55°45′N 37°37′E
- Agency executive: Feodor Chuchin (1926–1928?), Chairman
- Parent agency: Commission on the Organisation and Disposal of the V. I. Lenin Fund for Street Children Aid

Soviet Philatelic Association (SFA; Russian: Советская филателистическая ассоциация (СФА)) was a business run by the Soviet Union authorities in the field of philately.

== History ==
Two early philatelic public entities existed in the Soviet Union. These were All-Russian Society of Philatelists (created in 1922) and Philatelic International (or Filintern organised in 1924). In July 1924, an "All-Union Philatelic Association of Socialist Soviet Republics" was formed. It was called the "State Philatelic Organization". This association was entrusted to Feodor Chuchin. He also supervised another state body, Organisation of the Commissioner for Philately and Scripophily. The All-Union Philatelic Association ceased to exist soon after. It lacked a published decree of the All-Russian Central Executive Committee (VTsIK) and RSFSR Sovnarkom.

On 25 October 1926, a new association was established in Moscow by VTsIK and Sovnarkom decree. It replaced the Organisation of the Commissioner for Philately and Scripophily. SFA sold Soviet stamps to foreign dealers, Soviet philatelists, and schoolboys. These latter glued their stamps into school notebooks because of a lack of stamp albums.

The SFA organ was the journal Sovetskii Filatelist (Soviet Philatelist).

In 1938, the Soviet Philatelic Association was replaced with the Chief Philatelic Bureau.

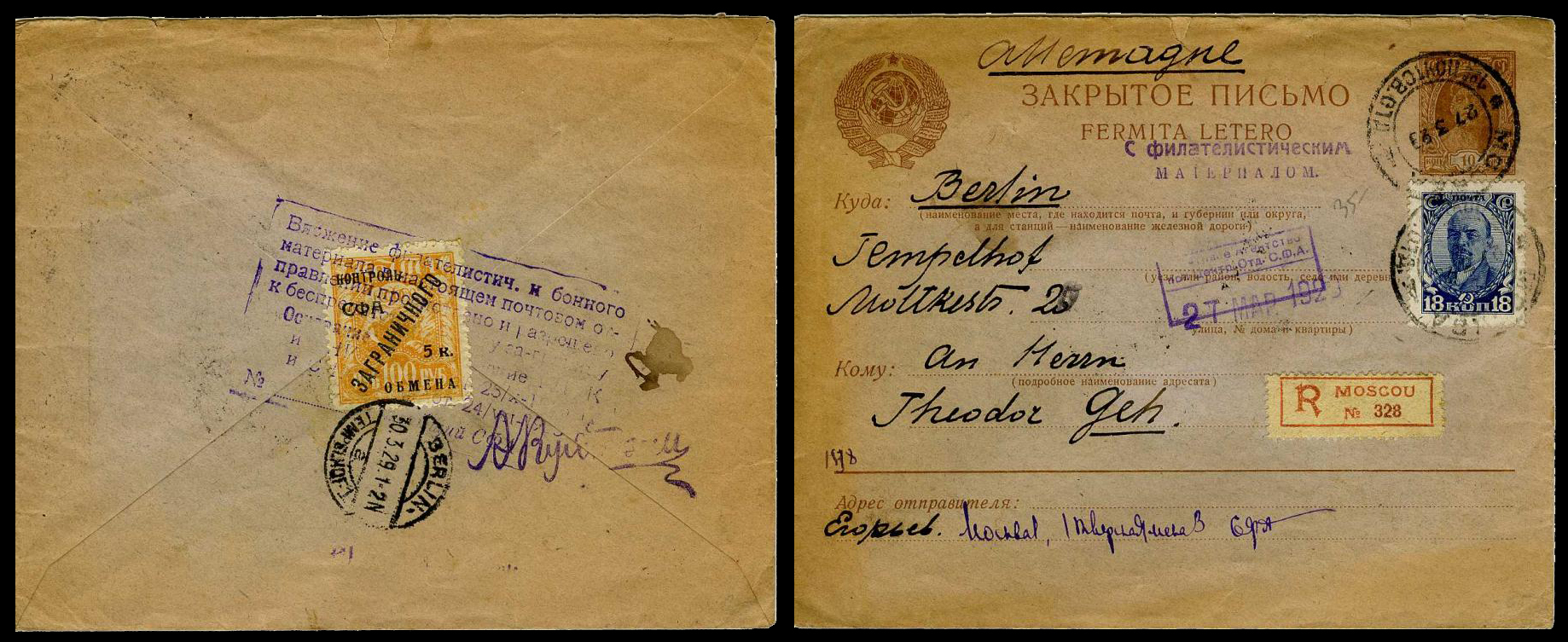
Registered letter sent from Moscow to Berlin that contained philatelic materials. It had special marks and an international trading tax stamp (placed on the envelope back) issued by the Soviet Philatelic Association

== See also ==
- All-Russian Society of Philatelists
- First All-Union Philatelic Exhibition
- International trading tax stamp
- Leniniana (philately)
- Moscow Society of Philatelists and Collectors
- Organisation of the Commissioner for Philately and Scripophily
- Philatelic International
- Russian Bureau of Philately
- Soviet Philatelist
