= Moscow Society of Stamp Collectors =

- Московское общество собирателей почтовых знаков
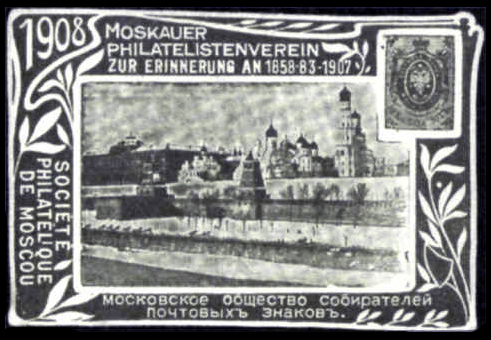
- A 1908 vignette of the Society commemorating the 50th anniversary of the first Russian stamp (1857), 25th anniversary of the Society (1883), and the 1st anniversary of its restoration (1907)
- Abbreviation: Russian: МОСПЗ (MOSPZ)
- Successor: Moscow Society of Philatelists and Collectors
- Formation: 10 October 1883; 143 years ago
- Founded at: Moscow, Russian Empire
- Dissolved: after 1914
- Type: NGO
- Legal status: municipal association
- Purpose: philately
- Headquarters: Arkhangelsky Lane (in 1883)
- Location: Moscow, Russian Empire
- Coordinates: 55°45′43″N 37°38′19″E
- Region served: Moscow, other Russian cities
- Members: 8 founding members, 62 members (1912–1913)
- Official language: Russian
- Chairman: Alexander Holstege
- Publication: Marki
- Remarks: private persons
- Formerly called: Moscow Society of Postage Stamp Collectors

Moscow Society of Stamp Collectors (Russian: Московское общество собирателей почтовых знаков, romanized: Moskovskoe obshchestvo sobirateley pochtovykh znakov) was one of the first philatelic organisations in the Russian Empire that was created in Moscow in 1883. Later on, it was dissolved and restored in 1907.

== History ==
In the 1860s and 1870s organisations of philatelists were founded in the United States, Great Britain, Germany, and France. Such organisations appeared later in other countries including Russia. In 1883, such a society was established in Moscow, among the first philatelic organisations in the Russian Empire. It was called the Moscow Society of Postage Stamp Collectors (Russian: Московское общество собирателей почтовых марок). By its 10th anniversary the Society had 26 members and published a brochure about its history.

The Society ceased in 1898, and after confirmation of the charter in 1907, it was re-established under the name of Moscow Society of Stamp Collectors.

After the October Revolution, most former members of the pre-revolutionary Society joined the new Moscow Society of Philatelists and Collectors organised in 1918.

== See also ==
- Moscow Municipal Society of Collectors
- Moscow Society of Philatelists and Collectors
- Postage stamps and postal history of Russia
