= First All-Union Philatelic Exhibition =

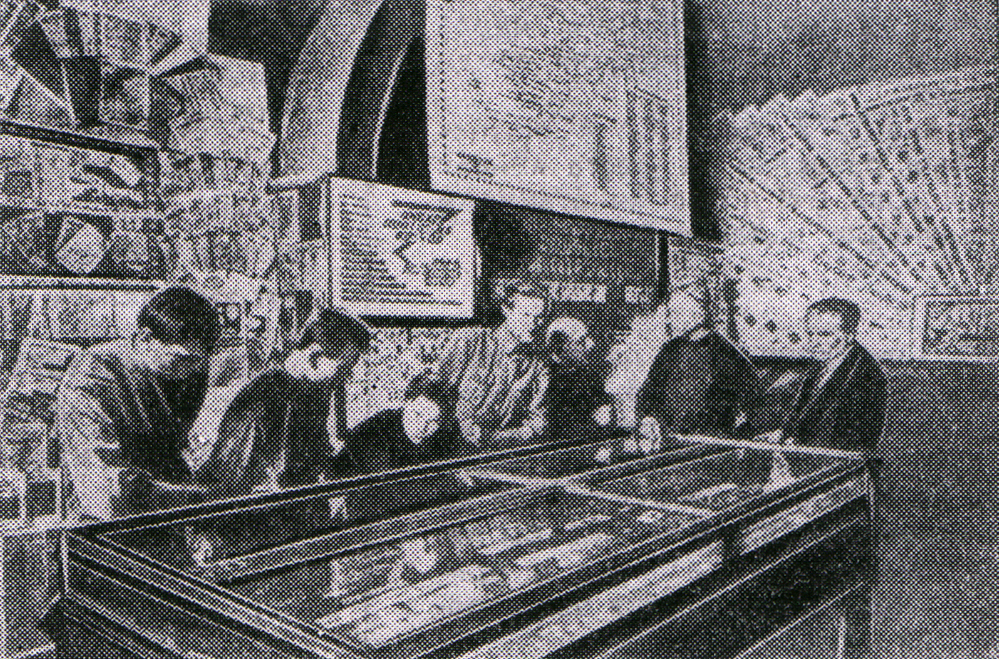
In the exhibition hall

The First All-Union Philatelic Exhibition was held in Moscow in 1924–1925. Its full name was the First All-Union Philatelic, Scripophilic and Numismatic Exhibition. This was because it combined the objects of philately, scripophily (collecting stock and bond certificates), and numismatics.

The exhibition was organised from 15 December 1924 to 15 February 1925. This was done by the Presidium of the All-Union Philatelic Association and Board of the All-Russian Society of Philatelists. The combined exhibition was meant to prepare formation of the All-Union Society of Collectors. The society was to be under the direction of Feodor Chuchin, the Commissioner for Philately and Scripophily.

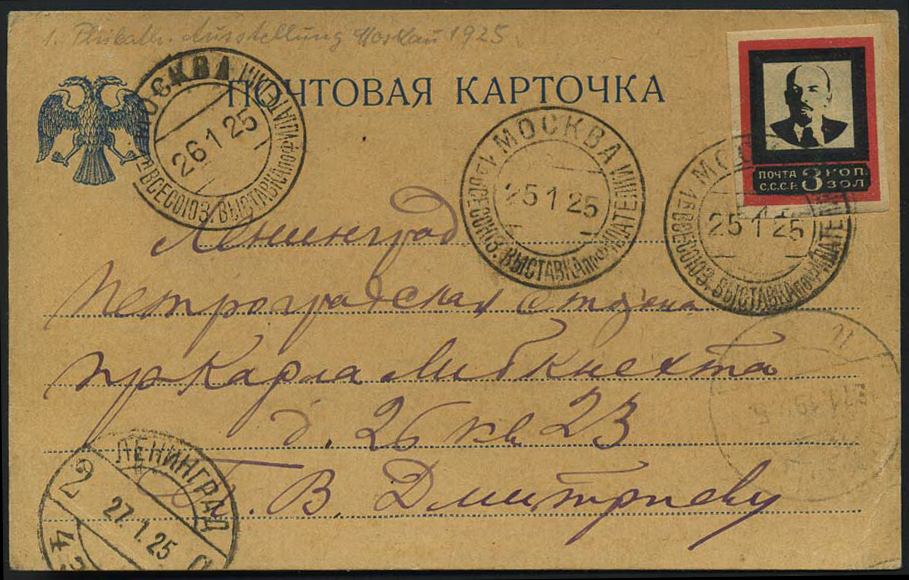
Postcard sent from the exhibition to Leningrad, with the USSR stamp from the Lenin Mourning issue of 1924, and exhibition's special cancellation

== See also ==
- All-Russian Society of Philatelists
- Leniniana (philately)
- Moscow Society of Philatelists and Collectors
- Organisation of the Commissioner for Philately and Scripophily
- Philatelic International
- Philately
- Soviet Philatelic Association
- Soviet Philatelist
