= List of philatelic magazines =

List of philatelic msgazines

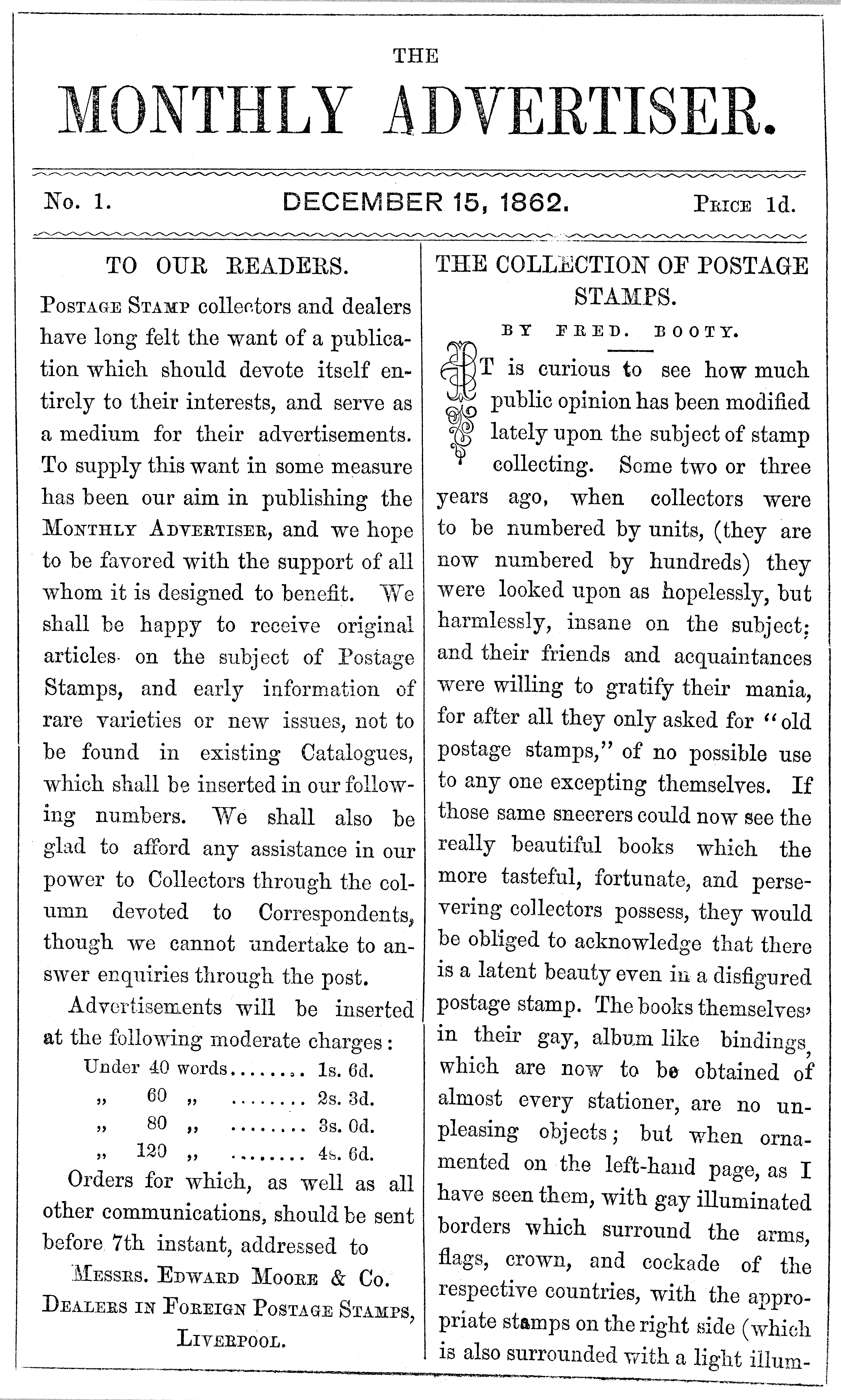
Front cover of first issue of Stamp Collectors' Review and Monthly Advertiser, the world's first dedicated philatelic magazine, initially named The Monthly Advertiser

This is an incomplete list of philatelic periodicals:

== English language ==
- The American Philatelist (Altoona, PA: American Philatelic Association, 1887–1908; Bellefonte, PA: American Philatelic Society, 1908– ) ISSN 0003-0473
- Australian STAMPS Professional - 2007– . Australia, States & Territories; Oceania (esp. Papua); Commonwealth. ISSN 1834-6383
- The Bay Phil (Redwood City, CA: Friends of the Western Philatelic Library, 1972-) ISSN 8756-5153
- Canadian Stamp News - worldwide topics with a focus on Canada ISSN 0702-3154
- Collectors Club Philatelist (New York, NY: Collectors Club of New York) ISSN 0010-0838
- First Days (Somerset, WI: American First Day Cover Society, 1955-) ISSN 0428-4836
- Gibbons Stamp Monthly (London, Stanley Gibbons Magazines) ISSN 0954-8084
- Linn's Stamp News (US) ISSN 0161-6234
- Monthly Universal Post - Karachi, Pakistan
- The Philatelist (London, Robson Lowe etc.) ISSN 0031-7373
- PMCC Bulletin (San Francisco, CA: Post Mark Collectors Club, 1947-) ISSN 1041-4894
- Stamp Collecting, 1913–1984
- The Stamp Collector: Asia Pacific's regional magazine for stamp collectors (Milsons Point, N.S.W. : Brian Moore at Asia-Pacific Press, 1991–1995) ISSN 1037-2199
- The Stamp Collector's Record, 1864 to 1876
- The Stamp-Collector's Review and Monthly Advertiser, 1862
- Austria The journal of the Austrian Philatelic Society - quarterly
- Stamp News Australasia www.stampnews.net.au incorporates The Australian Stamp Monthly, est. 1930. Founded by Bill Hornadge, the only monthly magazine in the Southern Hemisphere, available in print or digital formats. Back issues can be read free online.
- Stamp Magazine UK
- Topical Time (Greer, SC: American Topical Association, 1949-) ISSN 0040-9332

== German language ==
- Das Archiv – Magazin für Kommunikationsgeschichte (Germany)
- Berner Briefmarken Zeitung (Switzerland)
- Die Briefmarke (Austria, journal of Verband Österreichischer Philatelistenvereine)
- Briefmarkenspiegel (Germany)
- Deutsche Briefmarken-Revue (Germany)
- Deutsche Briefmarken-Zeitung (Germany, ISSN 0931-4393)
- Faszination (Austria, journal of UN Post)
- Die Lupe (Switzerland, journal of Swiss Post)
- Michel-Rundschau (Germany)
- philatelie (Germany, journal of Bund Deutscher Philatelisten, ISSN 1619-5892)
- postfrisch (Germany, journal of Deutsche Post AG, ISSN 1430-8533)
- Schweizer Briefmarken Zeitung (Switzerland, journal of Verband Schweizerischer Philatelistenvereine)

== French language ==
- L'Écho de la timbrologie (Yvert et Tellier, France)
- Timbres magazine (Paris: Timbropresse SA, L'Officiel de la philatélie) ISSN 1620-252X
- Le Timbre-Poste, 1863 to 1900

== Russian language ==
- Filateliya (Moscow: Federal State Unitary Enterprise Publishing and Trading Centre “Marka”, 1966–present) ISSN 0869-4478.
- Kollektsioner (Moscow: Union of Philatelists of Russia, 1963–present) ISSN 0132-439X
- Soviet Philatelist (Moscow: Organisation of the Commissioner for Philately and Scripophily, All-Russian Society of Philatelists, 1922–1932)

== Other languages and countries ==
=== Brazil ===
- O Brazil Philatelico

=== El Salvador ===
- El Salvador Filatélico - El Faro (El Salvador, San Salvador, Official Journal of the El Salvador Philatelic Society - ACES 2004–)

=== Finland ===
- Abophil ISSN 0355-7650
- Aihefilatelisti ISSN 0355-9688
- Filatelisti ISSN 0786-9363
- Keräilyuutiset ISSN 1235-645X
- Suomen postimerkkilehti ISSN 0355-7731

=== India ===
- Stamps of India Collectors Companion (India, New Delhi) ISSN 0972-3587

=== Japan ===
- Yuraku, 1914 to 1922

=== Netherlands ===
- Maandblad Filatelie (Netherlands, Almere: Stichting Nederlandsch Maandblad voor Philatelie. 1922–) ISSN 0166-3437

== Topical ==
- The BAPIP Bulletin (London: Holyland Philatelic Society, 1952–)
- The China Clipper (USA, Columbus OH: China Stamp Society, 1936–)
- Fakes Forgeries Experts (Kopenhagen, Denmark : Postiljonen)
- Monthly Air Mail (Liverpool, England : J.S. Davis, 1930–)
- Postal History News (Manly, N.S.W.: Ray Simpson, 1981–)
- World Cinderella News (Brisbane: T. Bolotnikoff, 1991– )
- The Middle East Philatelic Bulletin (online, , 2015–)

== See also ==
- List of philatelic libraries
- Philatelic literature
