= Philatelic International =

Philatelic International (Filintern)
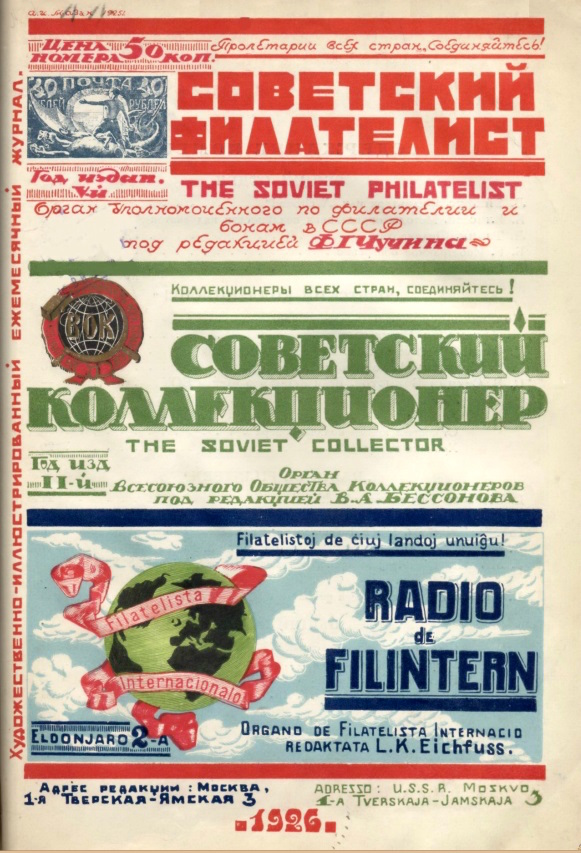
- Emblem of the organisation on the cover of its organ, magazine Radio de Filintern (in the combined issue with Soviet Philatelist and Soviet Collector)
- Abbreviation: Filintern
- Formation: 22 June 1924; 101 years ago
- Founded at: Moscow, USSR
- Dissolved: 1940s
- Type: NGO
- Legal status: international association
- Purpose: philately, scripophily (Note: Collecting stock and bond certificates.)
- Location: Moscow, USSR
- Coordinates: 55°45′N 37°37′E
- Region served: world
- Members: 102 members (1924)
- Official language: Esperanto, English, French, German
- Editor: Leongard Eichfuss
- Publication: Radio de Filintern
- Remarks: private persons

Philatelic International (Filintern) (Note: Russian: Филателистический интернационал (Filatelisticheskii international), brief name being Russian: Филинтерн (Filintern). This was similar to Comintern (Communist International) and Profintern (Red International of Labor Unions).) was an international philatelic society of collector-workers. It was founded and based in the Soviet Union in the 1920s to 1940s.

== History ==
The creation of the Filintern was set up at a conference in Moscow in 22 to 30 June 1924. Its formation was greeted by all branches of the All-Russian Society of Philatelists and at the same time by the Soviet Esperantists. At the conference opening, Feodor Chuchin, the Commissioner for Philately and Scripophily, declared:

Within the Filintern and through it we will not only adhere to all the rules of international philatelic ethics but also watch to make sure others uphold them.

— from Sovetskii Filatelist, (Note: Central organ of the Organisation of the Commissioner for Philately and Scripophily and the All-Russian Society of Philatelists (Soviet Philatelist).) June 1924, No. 7 (23).

A program for the Filintern's central organ was developed that included:

- "propaganda of the international union of philatelist-workers of all nations for the struggle against organised philatelist-dealers",
- "wide popularisation of ideological philately",
- "introducing Esperanto into philately and thus the establishment of lively communication between philatelists around the world."

Filintern facilitates the goals of philatelists, scripophilists (Note: Collectors of paper money, and stock and bond certificates.) and Esperantists. Within Filintern, they could:

- collect stamps and paper money,
- publish philatelic bulletins, journals and catalogues,
- most importantly, conduct foreign exchange.

Using philately, scripophily and Esperanto, the Soviet authorities also hoped for promoting communist propaganda among the foreign proletariat. Filintern received a further boost from the SAT (Sennacieca Asocio Tutmonda) Congress of 1926.

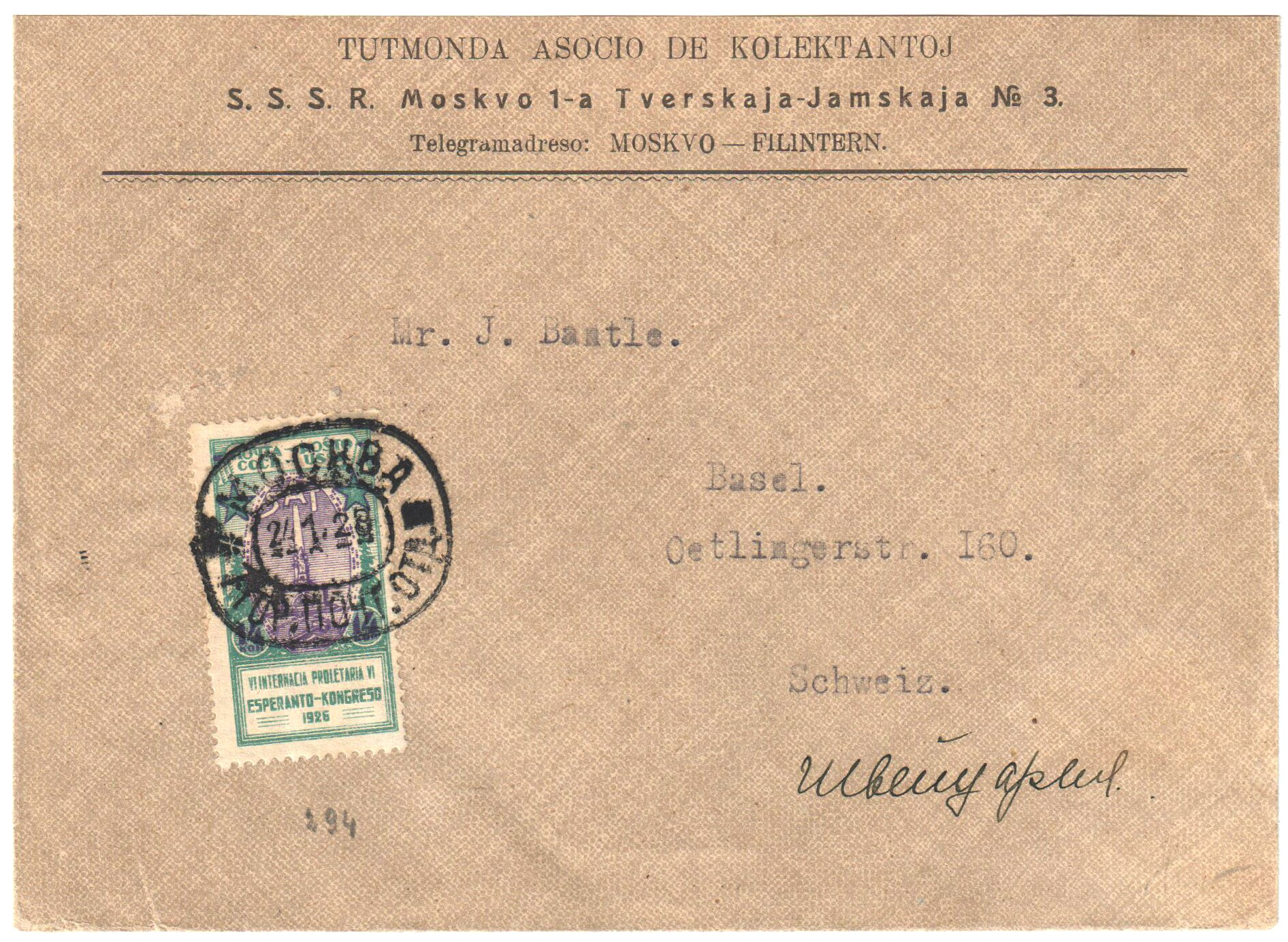
1928 Esperanto cover sent from Filintern in Moscow to Mr. J. Bantle in Basel

The Philatelic International's organ was the journal Esperanto: Radio de Filintern. It was an insert included in the monthly magazine Soviet Philatelist or Soviet Collector. Its Editor was a prominent Russian philatelist L. K. Eichfuss. The first issue of the journal appeared in January 1925.

== See also ==
- All-Russian Society of Philatelists
- First All-Union Philatelic Exhibition
- International trading tax stamp
- Leniniana (philately)
- Moscow Society of Philatelists and Collectors
- Organisation of the Commissioner for Philately and Scripophily
- Soviet Philatelic Association
- Soviet Philatelist
