= International trading tax stamp =

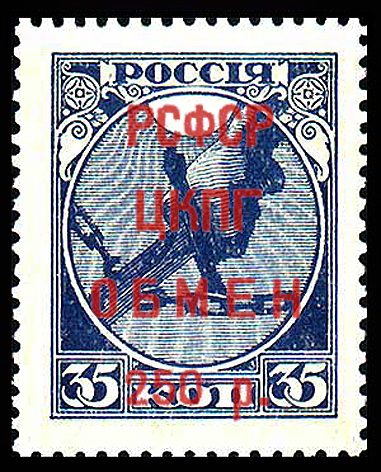
First RSFSR stamp of 1918 used with surcharge of 250 rubles by Posledgol as an international trading tax stamp in 1922

International trading tax stamp is kind of revenue stamps that were used in the Soviet Union in the 1920s and 1930s for taxation of the trade in stamps. The latter were considered a commodity for which philatelists could be taxed. This type of taxation was introduced by the Soviet government in addition to revenue it collected from stamp sales. International trading tax stamps were issued by the Posledgol Central Commission of VTsIK, the Organisation of the Commissioner for Philately and Scripophily and, later, by the Soviet Philatelic Association.

== Stamp issues ==
In 1922, the first international trading tax stamps were introduced by Posledgol. These were the first two RSFSR stamps designed by Rihards Zariņš and overprinted with surcharges of 250 and 500 rubles, respectively. These newly surcharged stamps did not have postal value and were used as a proof that taxes had been paid on stamps exported from, or imported into, Russia.

This practice was continued under the USSR, and in December 1923, some tsarist insurance stamp issues were subject to export surcharge made by the Organisation of the Commissioner for Philately and Scripophily. For the same purpose, Soviet definitive issues of 1921 were also used.

The first International trading tax stamps of the USSR

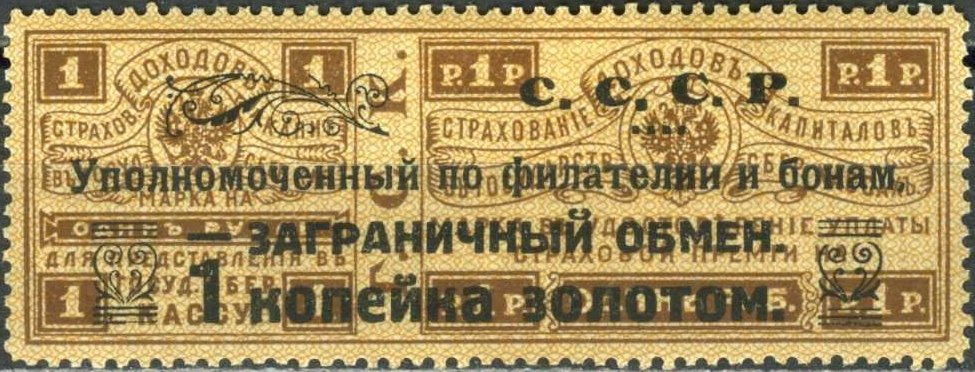
International trading tax stamp 1 kopeck, issued by the Organisation of the Commissioner for Philately and Scripophily, 1923

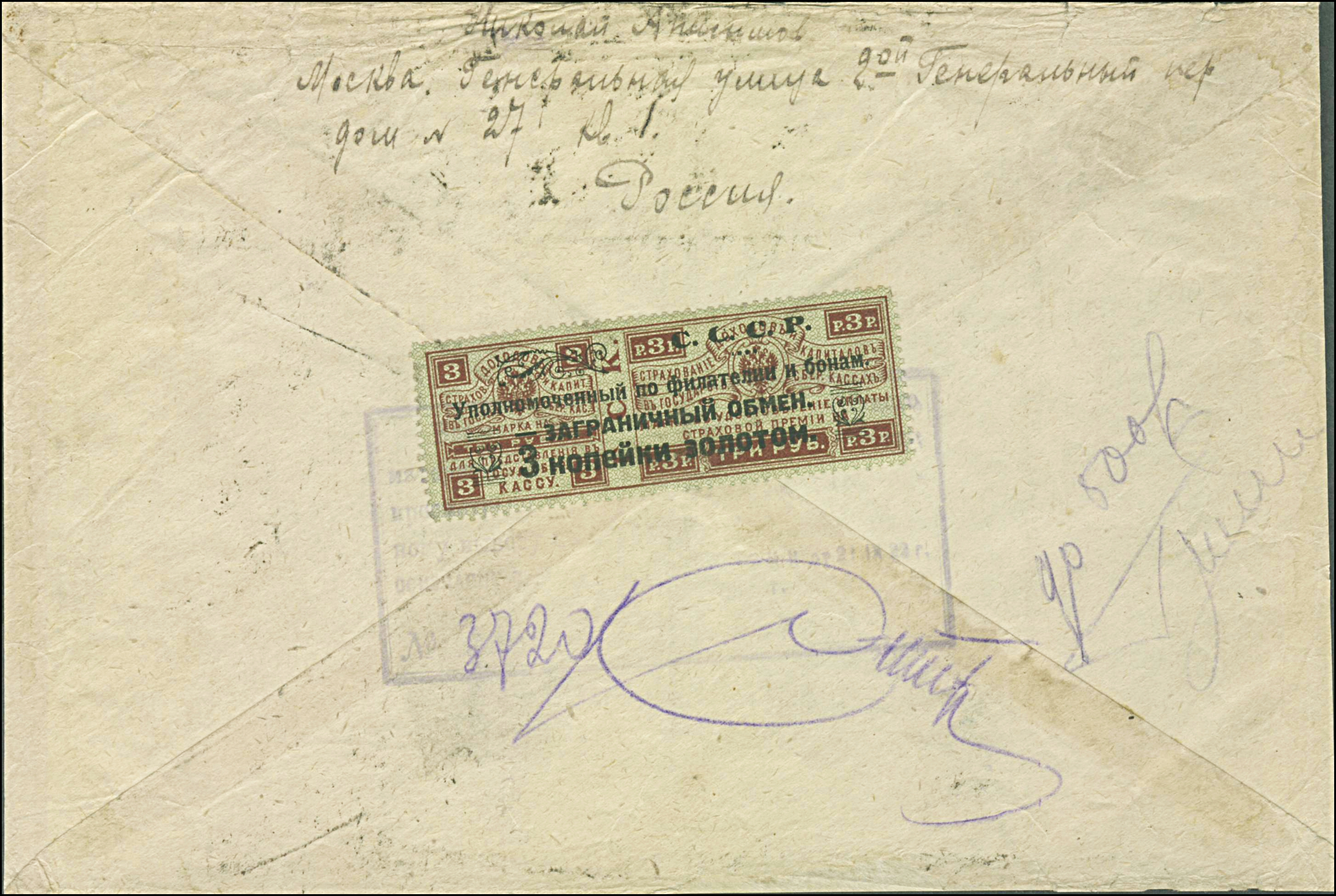
International trading tax stamp 3 kopecks, used 1924 on cover, officially cancelled

Subsequently, similar tax stamps were issued by the government, via the Organisation of the Commissioner for Philately and Scripophily and the Soviet Philatelic Association, in 1925, 1928, 1931, and 1932.

International trading tax stamps of the USSR

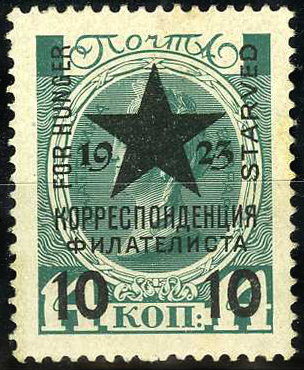
1923 issue of the Organisation of the Commissioner for Philately and Scripophily (Far East Branch). Overprinted postage stamp of the Russian Empire.

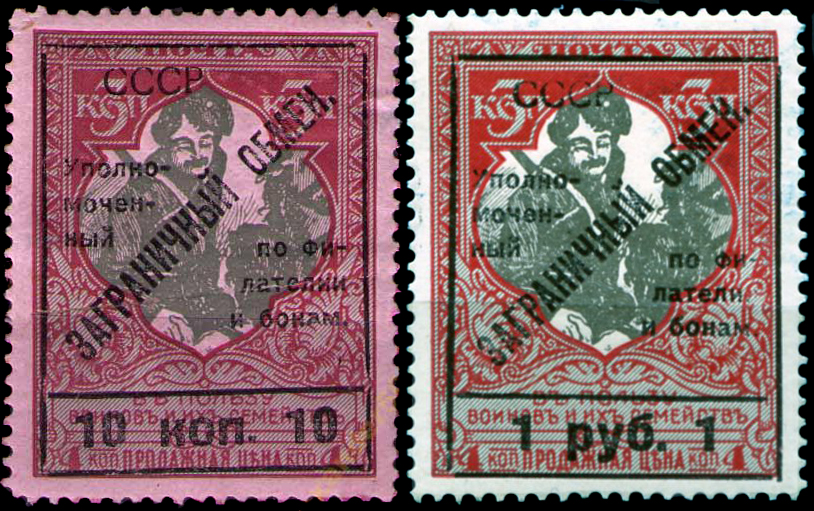
1925 issue of the Organisation of the Commissioner for Philately and Scripophily. Overprinted semi-postal stamps of the Russian Empire.

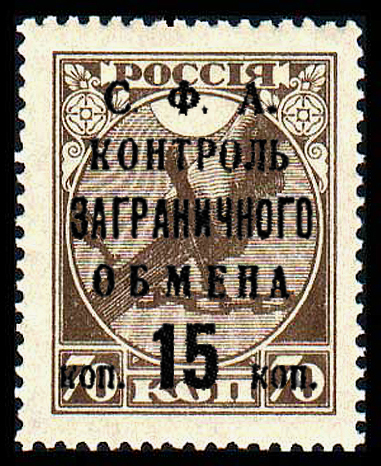
1932 issue of the Soviet Philatelic Association. Overprinted first RSFSR stamp of 1918.
International trading tax stamps of the USSR used on cover

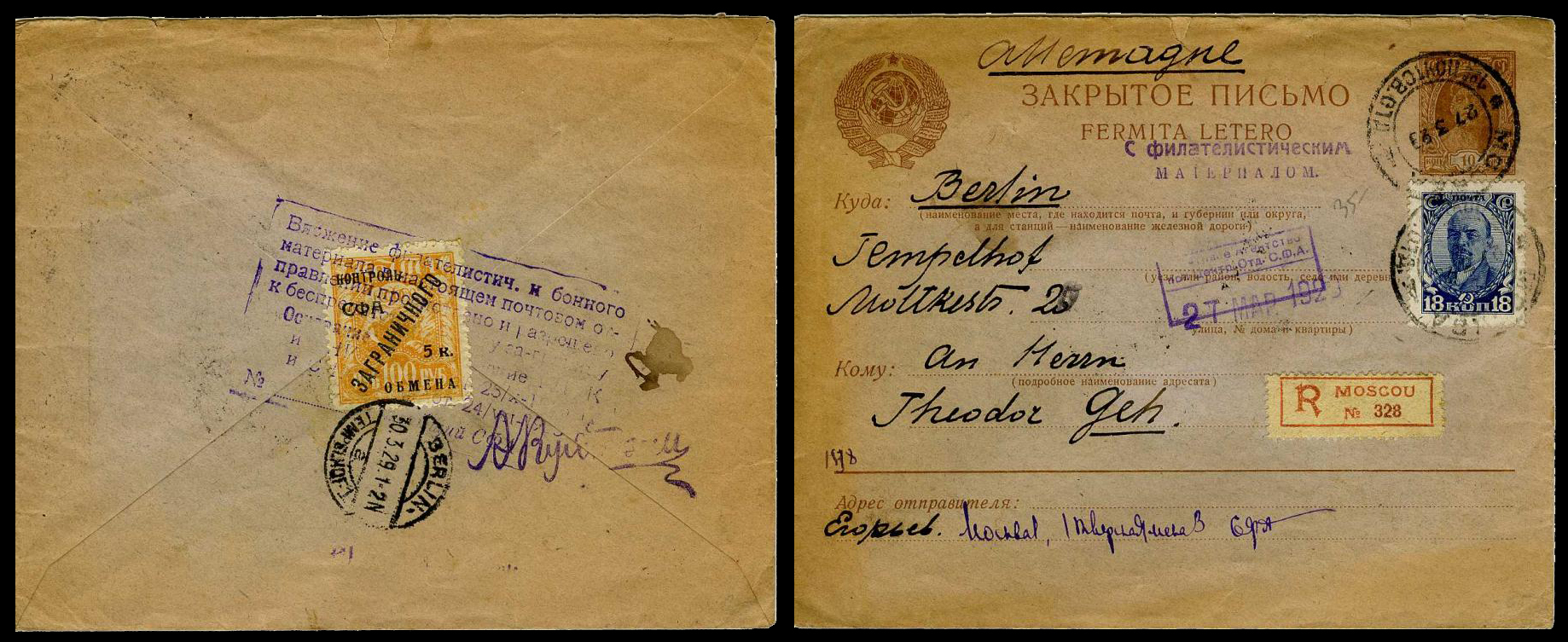
1928 issue used on cover

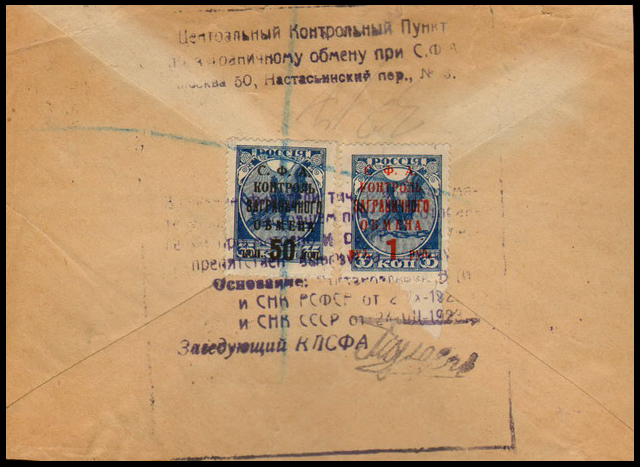
1932 issue used on cover

== History ==
During the period of the New Economic Policy, the early Soviet government followed a policy of regarding stamp traders as just another type of the petit-bourgeois traders. They were allowed to operate by paying a tax, although some of them conducted affairs in the old way. Illegal trading was especially spread among the old specialists in the export bureau, and a few of them were even arrested and jailed.

In conformity with the new governmental policy, the practice of taxing philatelists engaged in international stamp trading was introduced across the whole country. Moscow, Kharkov, Tashkent, Tbilisi, Leningrad, Rostov-on-Don, Vladivostok, and Simferopol were served as points of arrival where the trading tax had to be paid. The revenues from international trading tax stamps were directed to various relief funds.

Members of the All-Union Society of Collectors (VOK) denounced those philatelists who did not comply with the new trading policy. For example, one of the editors stated in Sovetskii Kollektsioner:

Alas, among philatelists there are several speculators, forgers, dishonest exchangers and other trading knights, who make a source of personal profit from philately. However, this of course does not diminish the cultural significance of philately as such.

— Fisher, A. R., "Chto sobirat'", Sovetskii Kollektsioner, 1930, 1 (101): 19.

In another article, a member advocated the VOK from blaming that it was "an organisation of private traders and consisted of speculators, disfranchised persons and similar elements which, of course do not merit the slightest trust."

In response, the author argued:

To give so shameful a characterisation of a social organisation which, as is known, operates on the basis of rules set down by the NKVD, and which does not have a single disfranchised member, but in fact has an impressive party and komsomol stratum, is possible only in the presence of [an] ample supply of nerve and cynicism.

— [Anon.], "Slova i dela Borisa Babitsogo", Sovetskii Kollektsioner, 1930, 2 (102): 60.

Using appropriately overprinted stamps, the philatelic tax system existed at least until 1940. Fees were collected even on the samples of stamps sent abroad by the Soviet Philatelic Association and its successor, the Philatelic Department of "Mezhdunarodnaya Kniga".

== See also ==
- All-Russian Society of Philatelists
- Organisation of the Commissioner for Philately and Scripophily
- Philatelic International
- Postage stamps and postal history of Russia
- Soviet Philatelic Association
- Soviet Philatelist
- Soviet and post-Soviet postage rates
- Stamp duty
- Stamps of the Soviet Union
- Trading stamp
