= Moscow Society of Philatelists and Collectors =

Soviet Russian organization

- Московское общество филателистов и коллекционеров
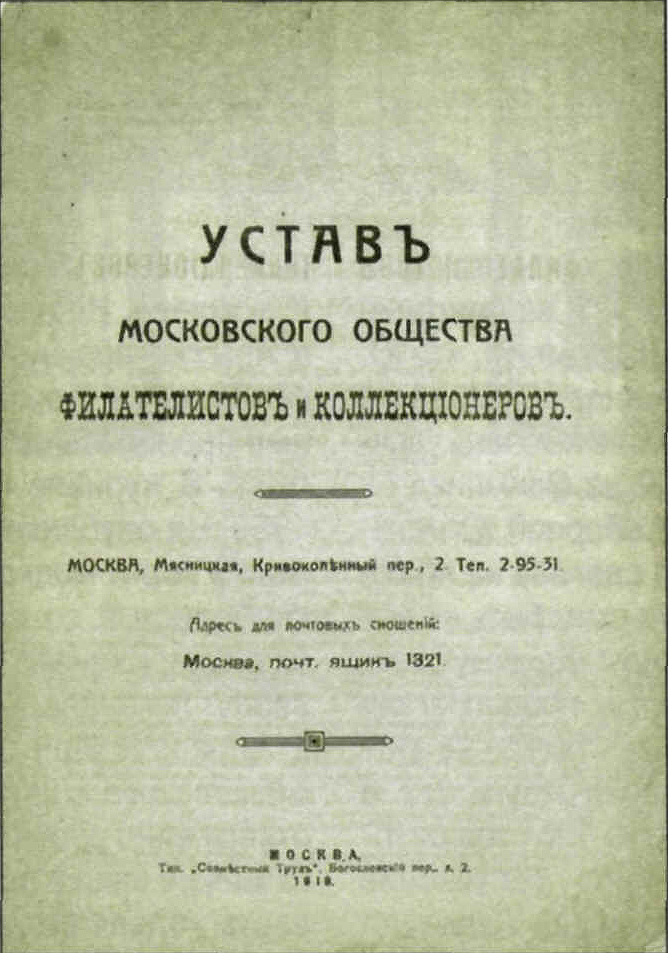
- Cover of the Society Charter, 1918
- Abbreviation: Russian: МОФИК (MOFIK)
- Predecessor: Moscow Society of Stamp Collectors
- Successor: All-Russian Society of Philatelists
- Formation: March 1918; 108 years ago
- Founded at: Moscow, RSFSR
- Dissolved: February 1921; 105 years ago
- Type: NGO
- Legal status: municipal association
- Purpose: philately, other forms of collecting
- Headquarters: 2 Krivokolenny Lane
- Location: Moscow, RSFSR
- Coordinates: 55°45′42″N 37°38′06″E
- Region served: Moscow, other RSFSR cities
- Official language: Russian
- Chairman: Pavel (Paul) Kalnozol
- Editor: Pavel (Paul) Kalnozol
- Publication: Russian Magazine of Collectors and Correspondents
- Remarks: private persons

Moscow Society of Philatelists and Collectors (Russian: Московское общество филателистов и коллекционеров, romanized: Moskovskoe obshchestvo filatelistov i kollektsionerov) was one of the first philatelic organisations in Soviet Russia that appeared in Moscow in 1918. Later on, it ceased and was replaced with the All-Russian Society of Philatelists (Russian: Всероссийское общество филателистов).

== History ==
In Russia prior to the October Revolution, there was a well established and organised philatelic community. With the beginning of World War I, activity of Russian philatelic societies and magazines stopped. Communications with foreign philatelic societies were interrupted.

After the October Revolution, stamp collectors managed to obtain legalisation of philately in Soviet Russia. The new magazine, Russian Magazine of Collectors and Correspondents (Russian: Российский журнал коллекционеров и корреспондентов), established in 1916 and issued till July 1918, promoted the foundation of the Moscow Society of Philatelists and Collectors. It was set up in Moscow in March 1918. This was the first philatelic organisation in the RSFSR. Most members of the pre-revolutionary Moscow Society of Stamp Collectors joined the new society. It existed till February 1921. After its dissolution, the All-Russian Society of Philatelists was established in 1923.

== See also ==
- All-Russian Society of Philatelists
- First All-Union Philatelic Exhibition
- Leniniana (philately)
- Moscow Municipal Society of Collectors
- Moscow Society of Stamp Collectors
- Organisation of the Commissioner for Philately and Scripophily
- Philatelic International
- Soviet Philatelic Association
- Soviet Philatelist
