= Kollektsioner =

Russian stamp publication

Kollektsioner (Sovetskii Kollektsioner)
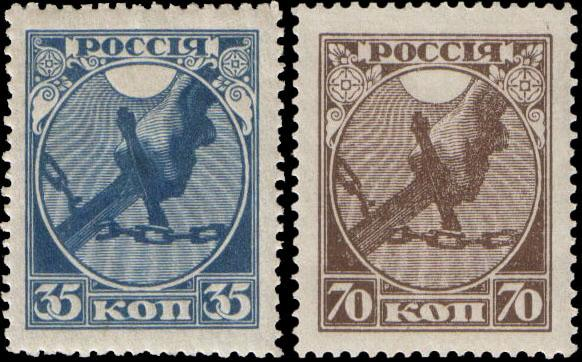
- First stamps of Soviet Russia, 1918, first described in Sovetskii Kollektsioner in 1965
- Former editors: Boris Stalbaum (founding editor)
- Categories: philately, other forms of collecting
- Frequency: annually
- Format: 21 cm
- Founder: Boris Stalbaum
- Founded: 1963
- First issue: July 10, 1963
- Company: Union of Philatelists of Russia
- Country: USSR (1963–1991), Russia (1992–present)
- Based in: Moscow
- Language: Russian
- ISSN: 0132-439X
- OCLC: 499249459

Kollektsioner (Russian: Коллекционе́р; Collector) or formerly Sovetskii Kollektsioner (Russian: Сове́тский коллекционе́р; Soviet Collector) is a Russian central philatelic yearbook. This annual publication started in 1963 and covered the history and design of postage stamps, and other related topics.

== History ==
For a number of earlier years, there was a magazine Sovetskii Kollektsioner (Soviet Collector). It was issued jointly with or instead of another magazine, Sovetskii Filatelist (Soviet Philatelist), published from 1922 to 1932 by the All-Russian Society of Philatelists.

The yearbook under the name of Sovetskii Kollektsioner first appeared in Moscow in 1963.

The yearbook was initially issued by the Moscow Municipal Society of Collectors and later, since 1966, by the All-Union Society of Philatelists (Russian: Всесоюзное общество филателистов).

Sovetskii Kollektsioner contained research articles in philately and other forms of collecting. For example, in the yearbook No. 3, 1965, Yu. Parmenov wrote an article entitled The First Soviet Postage Stamps. This was the first publication about discovery of the very first stamps of Soviet Russia issued in 1918. They were based on a design by Rihards Zariņš that depicted a hand with a sword cutting a chain.

== See also ==
- Filateliya
- List of philatelic magazines
- Postage stamps and postal history of Russia
- Soviet Philatelist
