= Manfred Dobin =

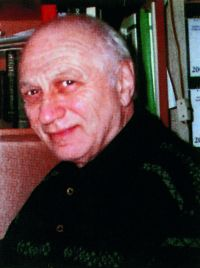
- Born: 10 September 1925; Oryol, Soviet Union
- Died: 25 May 2015 (aged 89); Saint Petersburg, Russia
- Engineering career
- Projects: Expert on postage stamps and postal history of Russia; specialized in the study of Russian imperial postmarks of the pre-adhesive period 1750–1858
- Awards: FIP exhibition award: Grand Prix

Manfred Dobin (10 September 1925 – 25 May 2015) was a Russian philatelic, stamp dealer and auctioneer. He was philatelic expert on Imperial postmarks, 1750–1858 of Russia. Dobin became a member of the Association Internationale des Experts en Philatéle, AIEP in 1995. He was also a member of the Expert Council on Russian Philately from 1991.

== Collecting interests and memberships ==
Dobin was a member of the Russian Union of Philatelists, the Saint Petersburg Union of Philatelists and the Grand Prix Club.

== Philatelic literature ==
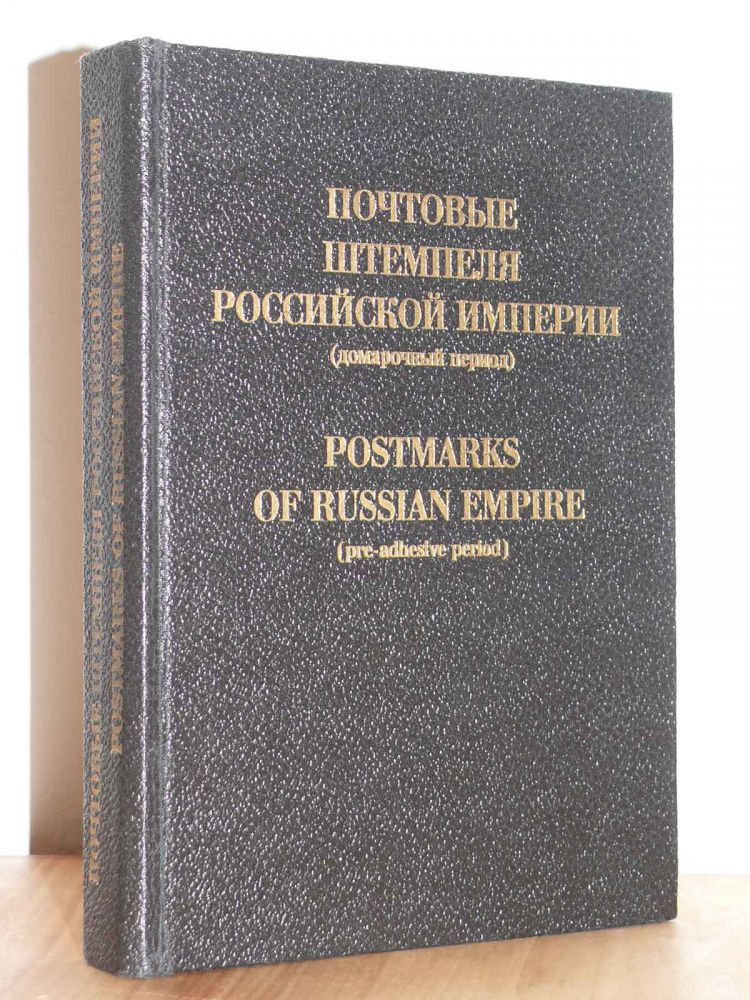
Postmarks of Russian Empire, 1993

Manfred Dobin had access to a number of postal and related archives in Russia. He was one of the first to write a standard work on the postmarks of the Russian Empire.

- Dobin, Manfred, Postmarks of Russian Empire (pre-adhesive period), Standard-Collection, Saint Petersburg (1993)
- Dobin, M.A. & L.G. Ratner, From the History of the Saint-Petersburg Post, 1703–1914, Standard-Collection, Saint Petersburg (2004).

=== Articles in philatelic journals ===
The postal history of the Russian Empire is the main focus of the work of Dobin. Relating to this subject he has authored articles in Filateliya SSSR (Philately of the USSR), a monthly bulletin published in Moscow since 1966. "Filateliya SSSR" was an organ of the Ministry of Communications of the USSR and the All-Union Society of Philatelists (Russian: Всесоюзное общество филателистов). Some of his articles were translated and published in Rossica.

== Honors and awards ==
Dobin was awarded a major FIP exhibition award: Russia (Grand Prix). During the Soviet period, the collection of M. A. Dobin "From the history of the postmark of Russia" won gold medals at the international exhibitions "Sotsfilex-83" in Moscow and "Sotsfileks-84" in Wrocław. At POLSKA 93, Large Gold was awarded for his exhibition 'Postal history of Russia'.

== See also ==
- Philatelic literature
