= Boris Balashov =

Boris Aleksandrovich Balashov Бори́с Алекса́ндрович Балашо́в
- Born: December 7, 1927; Saratov, USSR
- Died: January 20, 1974 (aged 46); Moscow, USSR
- Resting place: Moscow, Russia
- Education: Diploma of Higher Education
- Alma mater: Saratov State University
- Occupations: journalist, Editor-in-Chief
- Writing career
- Language: Russian
- Subject: philately

Boris Aleksandrovich Balashov (Russian: Бори́с Алекса́ндрович Балашо́в; 7 December 1927 – 20 January 1974) was Editor-in-Chief of the Soviet magazine "Filateliya SSSR" ("Philately of the USSR").

== Biography ==
Born in 1927 in the family of a worker. He started working at one of the Saratov plants, where he worked as a planer and, then, as an electrician.

After graduating from the Saratov State University, he was on the leading Komsomol work as a division head of the Saratov Regional Committee of VLKSM (Komsomol), and the editor of a provincial youth newspaper “Komsomolets”.

From 1958 to 1961, he worked as a head of the Press Section and, then, as a head deputy of the Propaganda and Agitation Division of the Central Committee of VLKSM.

At the later phase of his life, he was an Editor-in-Chief deputy and Editor-in-Chief for three Soviet magazines including "Filateliya SSSR" (1968–1974).

== See also ==
- Filateliya
