= Soviet Philatelist =

Soviet Russian-language magazine

Soviet Philatelist (Soviet Collector)
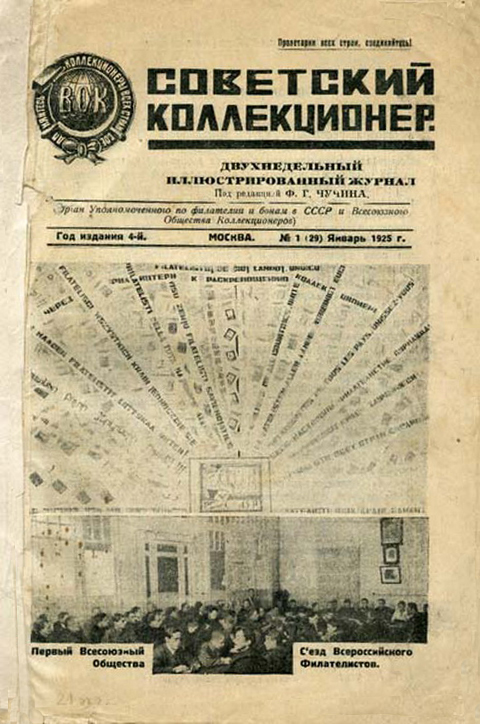
- Cover of the Soviet Collector's January 1925 issue showing a photo from the 1st Congress of the All-Russian Society of Philatelists
- Editor-in-chief: Kazimir Dunin-Barkovsky (1928–1932)
- Editor: V. A. Bessonov (Soviet Collector) (Note: When it was published under one cover of the three-part magazine.)
- Former editors: Feodor Chuchin (1922–1928); Piotr Butkevich (1928–1932); Albert Danzig (1928–1932)
- Categories: Philately
- Frequency: Monthly
- Format: 24 cm
- Circulation: 2000 (in 1922)
- Publisher: Feodor Chuchin
- Founder: Feodor Chuchin
- Founded: 1922; 103 years ago
- First issue: September 1922; 102 years ago
- Final issue Number: December 1932; 92 years ago Vol. 11, No. 12
- Company: Organisation of the Commissioner for Philately and Scripophily, All-Russian Society of Philatelists
- Country: USSR
- Based in: Moscow
- Language: Russian
- OCLC: 497315537

Soviet Philatelist or Sovetskii Filatelist (Note: Russian: Советский филателист.) was a Soviet central philatelic magazine published in 1922–1932 by the All-Russian Society of Philatelists. For a number of years, in 1925 and in 1928–1932, its name was changed to Soviet Collector or Sovetskii Kollektsioner. (Note: Russian: Советский коллекционер.)

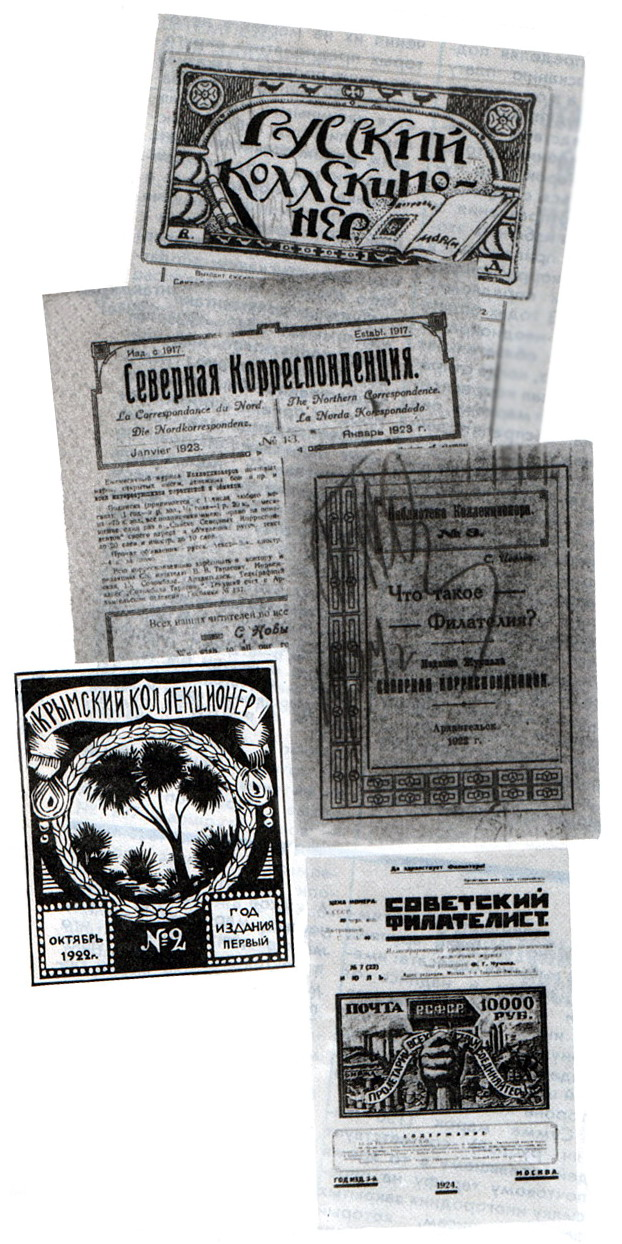
Early Soviet periodicals for collectors (top to bottom): Russian Collector, North Correspondence (2 issues), Crimean Collector, and Soviet Philatelist

== History ==
By 1922, shortly after the Civil War, a number of magazines and pamphlets for collectors appeared in Soviet Russia:

- Russkii Kollektsioner (Russian Collector), published in Novocherkassk,
- Priural'skii Kollektsioner (Ural Collector),
- Krymskii Kollektsioner (Crimean Collector), etc.

However, centralisation of collectors' organisations and periodicals was wanted:

...Instead of dissipating our forces, wouldn't it be better to rally all Russian collectors around one banner, the outline of which is already sufficiently drawn, and produce monthly handbooks containing articles of a serious nature? This rather than subsisting on themes such as "all possible stamps of Tibet," or some such? This is an important question, and as far as the journal we are contemplating is concerned, its external and internal appearance should be more pleasing than Krymskii Kollektsioner (Crimean Collector).

— from Russkii Kollektsioner, 1922, "On the First Issue of Priural'skii Kollektsioner",
cited in Filateliya SSSR, 1985, No. 9.

By 1924, these local magazines eventually closed down. In September 1922, the new magazine, Soviet Philatelist, first saw print in Moscow. Its founder and editor was Feodor Chuchin, the Commissioner for Philately and Scripophily.

In 1925, the magazine name was changed to Sovetskii Kollektsioner. The magazine was published biweekly. It was edited by V. A. Bessonov at that time.

In 1926 three magazines, Sovetskii Filatelist, Sovetskii Kollektsioner and Radio de Filintern, were combined. They began to be published under one cover. Their individual lineal numeration was preserved. The last combined issue came out in December 1927.

In the first half of 1928, the cover of the combined issues was only under one title, Sovetskii Filatelist. In July 1928, the magazine was renamed to Sovetskii Kollektsioner. It was published by the Soviet Philatelic Association and the All-Russian Society of Philatelists. The last issue appeared in December 1932.

Historical outline of publishing Soviet Philatelist (Soviet Collector)
| Title | Year | Start Issue | | End Issue | |
| Title | Year | No. (lineal No.) | Date | No. (lineal No.) | Date |
|---|---|---|---|---|---|
| Sovetskii Filatelist | 1922 | 1 | 9/1922 | 4 | 12/1922 |
| Sovetskii Filatelist | 1923 | 1 | 1/1923 | 12 | 12/1923 |
| Sovetskii Filatelist | 1924 | 1 (17) | 1/1924 | 11/12 (27/28) | 12/1924 |
Name change to:
| Sovetskii Kollektsioner | 1925 | 1 (29) | 1/1925 | 23/24 (51/52) | 12/1925 |
Combination of three magazines published under one cover:
| Sovetskii Filatelist | 1926 | 1 (53) | 1/1926 | 12 (64) | 12/1926 |
| Sovetskii Filatelist | 1927 | 1 (65) | 1/1927 | 12 (76) | 12/1927 |
| Sovetskii Kollektsioner | 1926 | 1 (25) | 1/1926 | 12 (36) | 12/1926 |
| Sovetskii Kollektsioner | 1927 | 1 (37) | 1/1927 | 12 (48) | 12/1927 |
| Radio de Filintern | 1926 | 1 (13) | 1/1926 | 12 (24) | 12/1926 |
| Radio de Filintern | 1927 | 1 (25) | 1/1927 | 12 (36) | 12/1927 |
Name change to (still three unique magazines, just one masthead):
| Sovetskii Filatelist | 1928 | 1 (77) | 1/1928 | 6 (82) | 6/1928 |
Name change to:
Sovetskii Kollektsioner
| Sovetskii Kollektsioner | 1928 | 1 (83) | 7/1928 | 6 (88) | 12/1928 |
| Sovetskii Kollektsioner | 1929 | 1 (89/91) | 1–3/1929 | 10/12 (98–100) | 10–12/1929 |
| Sovetskii Kollektsioner | 1930 | 1 (101) | 1/1930 | 12 (112) | 12/1930 |
| Sovetskii Kollektsioner | 1931 | 1 (113) | 1/1931 | 12 (124) | 12/1931 |
| Sovetskii Kollektsioner | 1932 | 1 (125) | 1/1932 | 10/12 (134/136) | 10–12/1932 |

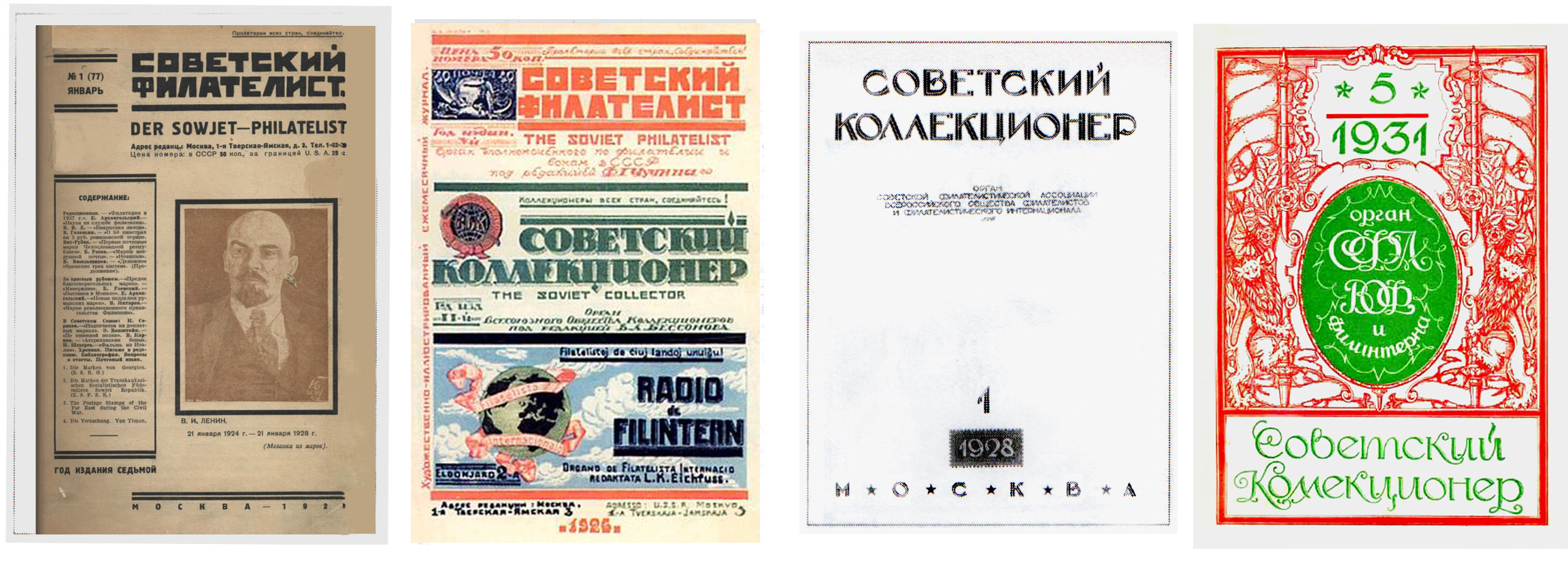
Evolution of the magazine (left to right): Soviet Philatelist (1928), three-part issue (1926), and Soviet Collector (1928 and 1931)

== See also ==
- All-Russian Society of Philatelists
- Filateliya
- First All-Union Philatelic Exhibition
- International trading tax stamp
- Kollektsioner
- Leniniana (philately)
- List of philatelic magazines
- Moscow Society of Philatelists and Collectors
- Organisation of the Commissioner for Philately and Scripophily
- Philatelic International
- Soviet Philatelic Association
