= Organisation of the Commissioner for Philately and Scripophily =

Russian philatelic organization from 1922 to 1926

- Организация Уполномоченного по филателии и бонам в СССР (ОУФБ)

Agency overview
- Formed: 30 March 1922; 104 years ago
- Preceding agency: Russian Bureau of Philately
- Dissolved: 25 October 1926; 99 years ago
- Superseding agency: Soviet Philatelic Association
- Jurisdiction: VTsIK
- Headquarters: Moscow, USSR; 55°46′23″N 37°35′26″E
- Agency executive: Feodor Chuchin, Commissioner
- Parent agency: POMGOL

Organisation of the Commissioner for Philately and Scripophily (Russian: Организация Уполномоченного по филателии и бонам в СССР (ОУФБ)) was established in Moscow in 1922 by the All-Russian Central Executive Committee (VTsIK) for matters concerned with philately and bonds. An old Bolshevik Feodor Chuchin headed this organisation.

== History ==
To help finance the Central Famine Relief Committee (POMGOL), VTsIK decided to sell abroad postage stamps of Imperial Russia and the newly formed governments of the Civil War period. The idea was to obtain hard currency for them. Feodor Chuchin was named in 1921 the POMGOL commissioner for matters pertaining to stamp donations.

In March 1922, the Organisation of the Commissioner for Philately and Scripophily (Note: Collecting stock and bond certificates.) was set up. Chuchin was appointed to supervise its activities in Soviet Russia and abroad. The sale of stamps and paper money was profitable:

In the financial report for November 1922 it was indicated that the finance office of the VTsIK received deposits worth 2,970,000 rubles on the organisation's account.

— from Sovetskaya Kultura, (Note: The Moscow central newspaper (Soviet Culture).) 10 March 1983, "In those distant years".

The Organisation of the Commissioner for Philately and Scripophily existed till 1926 and was superseded by the Soviet Philatelic Association.

Examples of international trading tax stamps issued by the Organisation

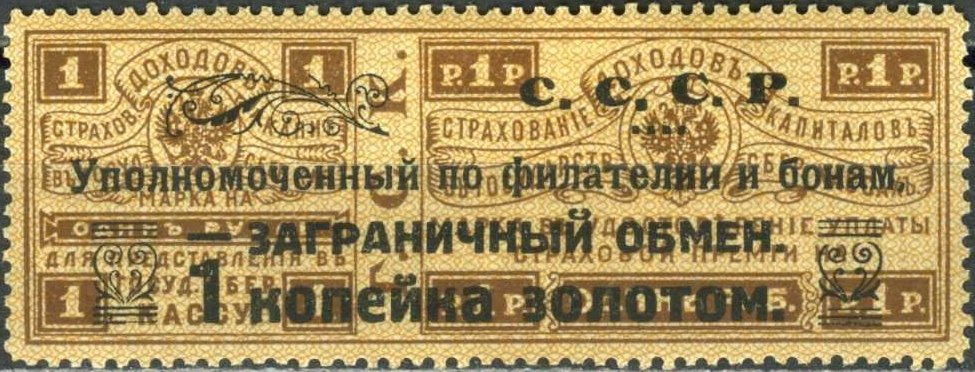
1923

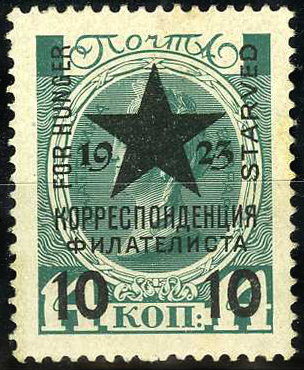
1923

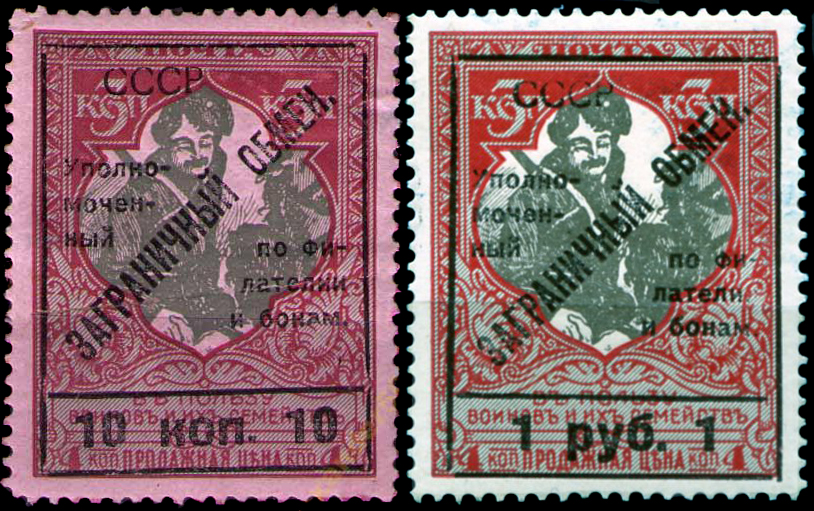
1925

== See also ==
- All-Russian Society of Philatelists
- First All-Union Philatelic Exhibition
- International trading tax stamp
- Leniniana (philately)
- Moscow Society of Philatelists and Collectors
- Philatelic International
- Russian Bureau of Philately
- Soviet Philatelic Association
- Soviet Philatelist
