= All-Russian Society of Philatelists =

National organisation in the Soviet Union

- Всероссийское общество филателистов
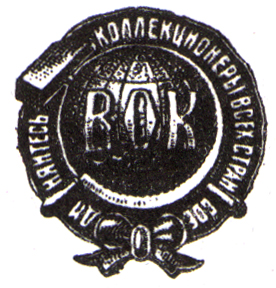
- Emblem of the organisation when it became the All-Union Society of Collectors
- Abbreviation: Russian: ВОФ (VOF), Russian: ВОК (VOK)
- Predecessor: Moscow Society of Philatelists and Collectors
- Successor: All-Union Society of Philatelists, All-Union Society of Collectors
- Formation: 6 April 1923; 103 years ago
- Founded at: Moscow, USSR
- Dissolved: late 1930s
- Type: NGO
- Legal status: national association
- Purpose: philately, scripophily, (Note: Collecting stock and bond certificates.) numismatics, ex-libris collection
- Headquarters: 31 Herzen Street
- Location: Moscow, USSR
- Coordinates: 55°45′27″N 37°35′54″E
- Region served: USSR
- Members: ~3,000 members (1926)
- Official language: Russian
- Secretary General: Leongard Eichfuss
- Chairman of the Board: Vladimir Repman (1923–1924); Leongard Eichfuss (1924–1925); Boris Bildin (1925–1928); Kazimir Dunin-Barkovsky (1928–1934)
- Deputy Chairman of the Board: B. F. Pamfilov
- Second Secretary: B. S. Pashkov
- Treasurer: E. I. Markevich
- Main organ: Board of the Society; Publication: Soviet Philatelist
- Remarks: private persons, 51 regional branches (1927)

All-Russian Society of Philatelists (Russian: Всероссийское общество филателистов, romanized: Vserossiyskoe obshchestvo filatelistov) was the first national philatelic organisation in Soviet Russia established in 1923. Later on, it was subsequently renamed and reorganised into the All-Union Society of Philatelists (Russian: Всесоюзное общество филателистов, romanized: Vsesoyuznoe obshchestvo filatelistov) (Note: This organisation was re-established in 1966 as the All-Union Society of Philatelists.) and the All-Union Society of Collectors (Russian: Всесоюзное общество коллекционеров, romanized: Vsesoyuznoe obshchestvo kollektsionerov).

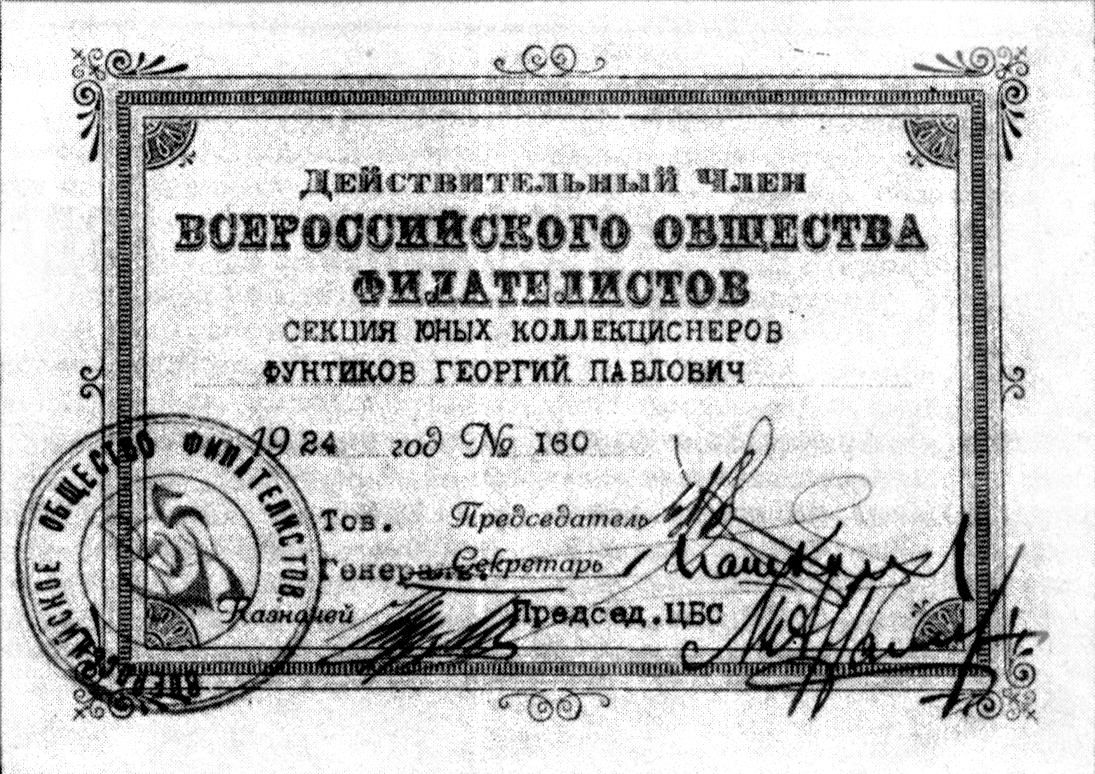
Membership card of the Society, Section of Junior Philatelists, 1924

== History ==
In Soviet Russia, the first philatelic organisation, Moscow Society of Philatelists and Collectors, appeared in 1918 in Moscow. In 1922, the idea of a new countrywide philatelic society was supported by the Russian Bureau of Philately at the RSFSR National Commissariat of Post and Telegraphs. On 15 March 1923, the charter of the All-Russian Society of Philatelists was approved. On 6 April 1923, its first meeting took place in Moscow.

In 1923, 643 collectors joined the All-Russian Society of Philatelists. The society's branches worked in Yerevan, Tiflis, Tashkent, Ashgabat, Baku, and other cities. In 1924–1925, the First All-Union Philatelic Exhibition was held. The All-Russian Society of Philatelists published the Soviet Philatelist magazine (1922–1932). It existed until the late 1930s.

== See also ==
- First All-Union Philatelic Exhibition
- International trading tax stamp
- Leniniana (philately)
- Moscow Society of Philatelists and Collectors
- Organisation of the Commissioner for Philately and Scripophily
- Philatelic International
- Philately
- Soviet Philatelic Association
- Soviet Philatelist
