= Zaymishche, Vologda Oblast =

Zaymishche Займище
- Village
- Location within Vologda Oblast Location within Russia
- Coordinates: 59°38′N 45°41′E
- Country: Russia
- Region: Vologda Oblast
- District: Nikolsky District
- Time zone: UTC+3:00

Zaymishche (Russian: Займище) is a rural locality (a village) in Baydarovskoye Rural Settlement, Nikolsky District, Vologda Oblast, Russia. The population was 27 as of 2002.

== Geography ==
The distance to Nikolsk is 27 km, to Baydarovo is 8 km. Kumbiser is the nearest rural locality.
