= Filateliya =

Russian-language philatelic magazine

Filateliya (Filateliya SSSR)
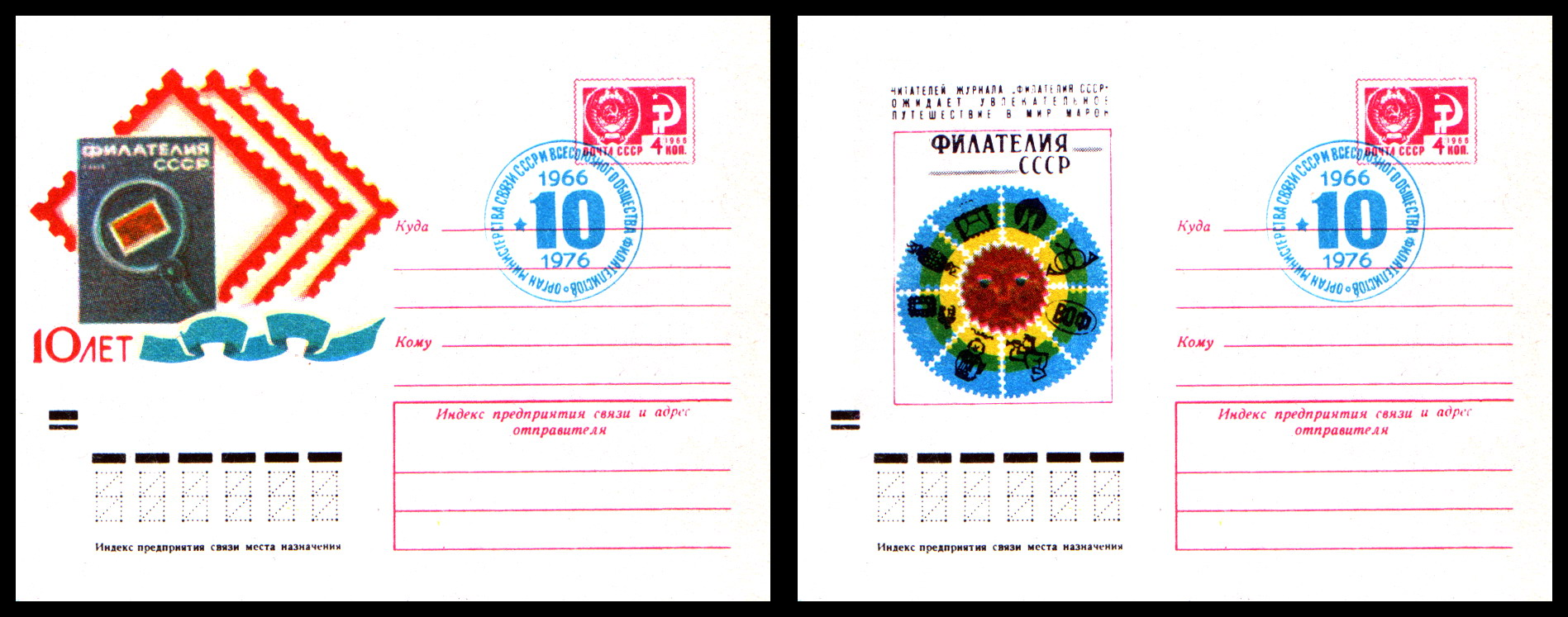
- Two USSR illustrated stamped envelopes that marked the 10th anniversary of the magazine Filateliya SSSR, 1976
- Editor: Yevgeni Obukhov
- Former editors: Viktor Stepanov (1966–1968); Boris Balashov (1968–1974); Igor Chekhov (1975–1987); Yuly Bekhterev (1987–2005)
- Categories: philately
- Frequency: monthly
- Format: 24 cm
- Circulation: ~100,000 (in 1977); ~44,000 (in 1991); 2200 (in 2010)
- Founded: 1966; 60 years ago
- First issue: July 1966; 59 years ago
- Company: Ministry of Communications of the USSR (1966–1991); All-Union Society of Philatelists (1966–1989) “Soyuzpechat” Central Philatelic Agency (1969–1987); Union of Philatelists of the USSR (1989–1992); Federal State Unitary Enterprise "Marka" (1991–present)
- Country: USSR (1966–1991), Russia (1992–present)
- Based in: Moscow
- Language: Russian
- Website: www.rusmarka.ru/page01.aspx
- ISSN: 0869-4478
- OCLC: 26365588

Filateliya (Note: Russian: Филателия.) (Philately) or formerly Filateliya SSSR (Note: Russian: Филателия СССР.) (Philately of the USSR) is a Russian central philatelic magazine. It first appeared in 1966 as the monthly bulletin Filateliya SSSR and was issued by the USSR Ministry of Communications. The magazine content includes the history and design of postage stamps, and other related themes.

== History ==
The bulletin Filateliya SSSR was published monthly in Moscow since 1966. It was an organ of the Ministry of Communications of the USSR and the All-Union Society of Philatelists (Russian: Всесоюзное общество филателистов). Its predecessor was the magazine Sovetskii Filatelist (Soviet Philatelist).

The bulletin (later, magazine) included the following information:

- announcements of new postage stamp issues,
- information about research in postal and philatelic history,
- information about thematic collecting,
- news about the activities of the All-Union Society of Philatelists,
- news about the philatelic organisations in other socialist countries,
- a section for junior philatelists.

The magazine repeatedly won awards at international philatelic exhibitions. Its circulation was approximately 100,000 copies (in 1977).

In 1991, the last year of the USSR existence, the magazine was printed with the circulation of about 44,000 copies. Since then, it was published under the new name of Filateliya.

== See also ==
- Boris Balashov
- Kollektsioner
- List of philatelic magazines
- Manfred Dobin
- Soviet Philatelist
