= Feodor Chuchin =

Russian government official (1883–1942)

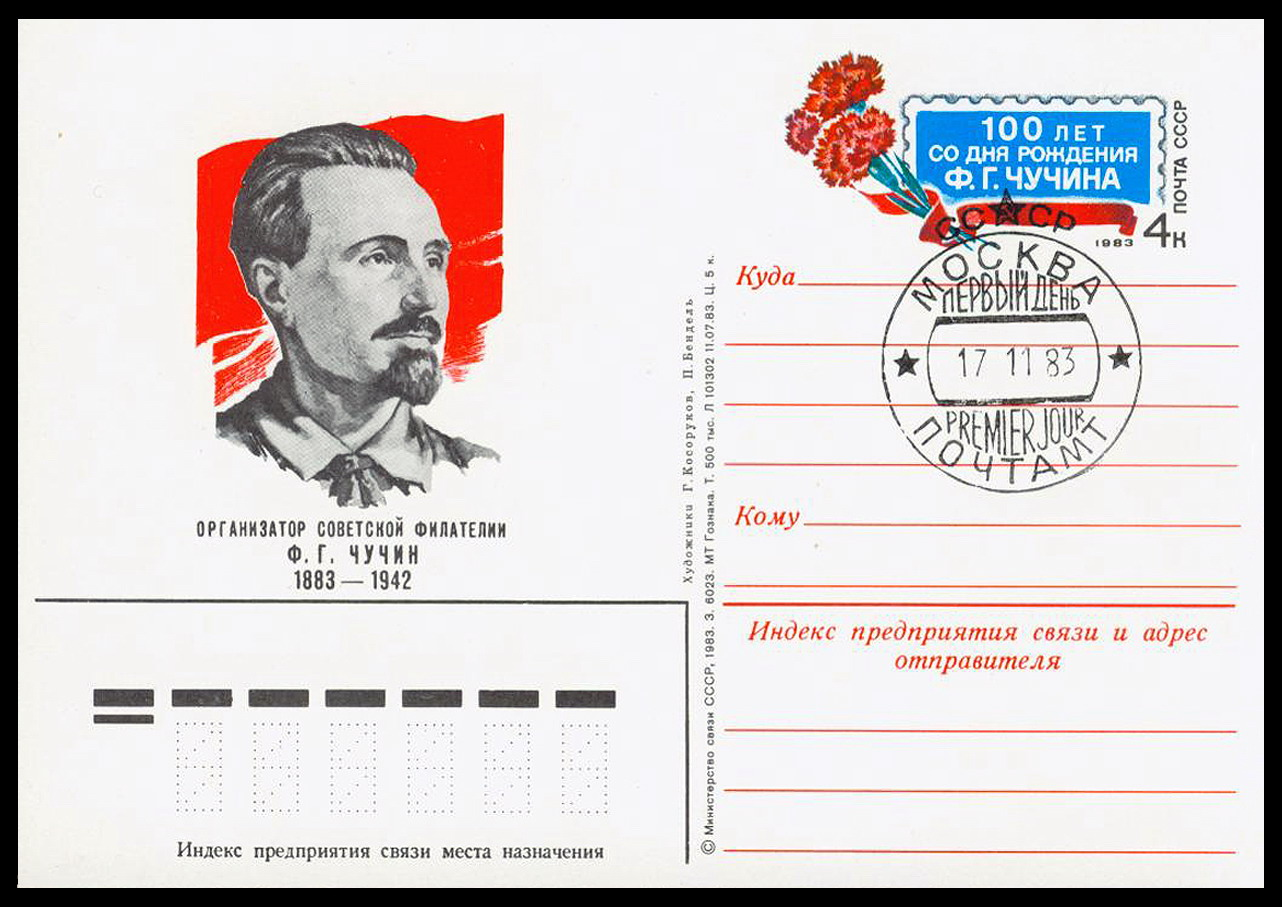
- Feodor Chuchin on a Russian item of postal stationery
- Born: 17 April 1883; Zaymishche Kirillovsky Uyezd, Novgorod Governorate, Russian Empire
- Died: 15 January 1942 (aged 58); Moscow, Russian SFSR, Soviet Union

Feodor Grigorovich Chuchin (Russian: Фёдор Григорьевич Чучин; 17 April 1883 – 15 January 1942) was an official in the Soviet government who was chairman of the campaign to eliminate illiteracy. He also was an author on numismatic and philatelic topics and is considered to be the founder of Soviet philately.

== Early life and career ==
Feodor Chuchin was born in 1883 in to a peasant family. In 1904 he joined the Russian Social Democratic Labour Party.

== Career ==
As an official in the Soviet government, he was chairman of the campaign to eliminate illiteracy.

In 1924, he published Bumazhnye Denezhnye Znaki (paper banknotes) which has become a standard work on the subject. In the same year he became founder and editor of the magazine Soviet Philatelist as well as the founder and chairman of the Soviet Philatelic Association.

In 1925, as Commissioner for Philately, Chuchin published his Catalogue of the Russian Rural Stamps, the local stamps of Russia known as Zemstvo stamps, the numbering system of which has become the standard used for those issues.

In 1984, John Barefoot published a revised edition of Chuchin's catalogue as volume 14 of his European Philately series.

== Death ==
Chuchin died in 1942.

== Selected publications ==
- Bumazhnye Denezhnye Znaki (Paper Banknotes). Moscow, 1924. (Russian language)
- Catalogue of the Russian Rural Stamps. Commissioner for Philately and Vouchers of U.S.S.R., Moscow, 1925.
- Russia Zemstvos. Revised edition. Edited by John Barefoot. J. Barefoot Ltd., York, 1984.

== See also ==
- Organisation of the Commissioner for Philately and Scripophily
