= Scripophily =

Study and collection of stock and bond certificates

Scripophily is the study and collection of stock and bond certificates. (Note: "... scripophily, the collecting of stock certificates: a niche hobby ....") A specialized field of numismatics, scripophily has developed as an area of collecting because of the inherent beauty of certain historical certificates, and because of interest in the historical context of many of the documents. In addition, some stock certificates serve as excellent examples of engraving. Occasionally, an old stock certificate is found that still has value, representing actual shares in the original or a successor company.

== History ==
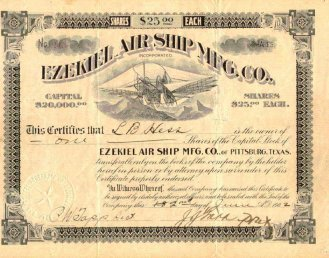
Ezekiel Air Ship stock certificate

Scripophily, the collecting of old stocks and bonds, gained recognition as a hobby around 1970. The word "scripophily" was coined by combining words from English and Greek. The word "scrip" represents an ownership right and the word "philos" means "to love".

Today, there are thousands of collectors worldwide in search of scarce, rare, and popular stock and bond certificates. Whether they are private investors or business people, many collectors enjoy scripophily as a hobby, while others consider it a good form of investment.

Many collectors appreciate the historical significance of old certificates. Others prefer the beauty of older stock and bond certificates that were printed in various colors with fancy artwork and ornate engravings. In recent times, certificates issued by dot-com companies and companies involved in scandals have become particularly popular amongst scripophilists.

A recent addition to the hobby of scripophily is collecting shares issued in one's name. Common companies that issue personalized stock certificates include The Walt Disney Company, Harley-Davidson, McDonald's, Starbucks, Google, Ford Motor Company, The Coca-Cola Company, and Berkshire Hathaway.

Many autograph collectors engage in scripophily, looking for certificates signed by historic or well-known figures. Certificates of this type include stock certificates issued by Standard Oil Company and signed by John D. Rockefeller, Franklin Fire Insurance Company certificates signed by Henry Charles Carey, Ringling Brothers and Barnum & Bailey Circus, Atari Corporation, Eastern Air Lines certificates signed by Eddie Rickenbacker when he served as the company's president, Tucker Corporation, and many others.

== As a hobby ==
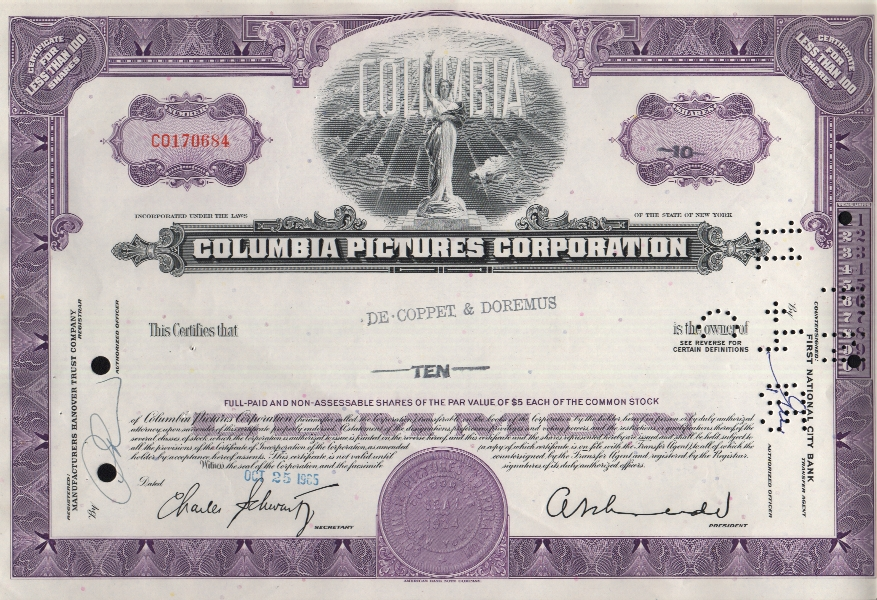
Columbia Pictures

A large part of scripophily is the study of financial history. Over the years there have been millions of companies that needed to raise money. In order to do so, the founders of these companies issued securities. Generally speaking, they either issued equity securities in the form of stock or debt securities in the form of bonds. However, there are many varieties of equity and debt instruments, including common stock, preferred stock, warrants, and bonds of various types.

Each certificate is a piece of history about a company and its business. Some companies became major successes, while others were acquired and merged with other companies. Some companies and industries were successful until they were replaced by new technologies. Some companies have been the center of scandal or fraud. The color, paper, signatures, dates, stamps, cancellations, borders, pictures, vignettes, industry, stockbroker, name of company, transfer agent, printer, and holder name are all of interest to scripophilists.

Many companies either were never successful or went bankrupt, so that their certificates became worthless pieces of paper until the hobby of scripophily began. The mining boom in the 1850s, railroad construction in the 1830s, the oil boom in the 1870s, telegraphy in the 1850s, the automobile industry beginning around 1900, aviation beginning around 1910, electric power and banks in the 1930s, the airline wars and mergers in the 1970s, cellular telephones beginning in the 1980s, long-distance telephone service in the 1980s and 1990s, and most recently the dot-com era and Enron all resulted in historically significant certificates being generated and issued.

Today, stocks and bonds are typically issued electronically, meaning fewer paper certificates are issued as a percentage of actual stock issued. The Internet has played a role in raising awareness of the hobby. A number of websites now exist that sell old stocks and bonds.

== Guidelines ==
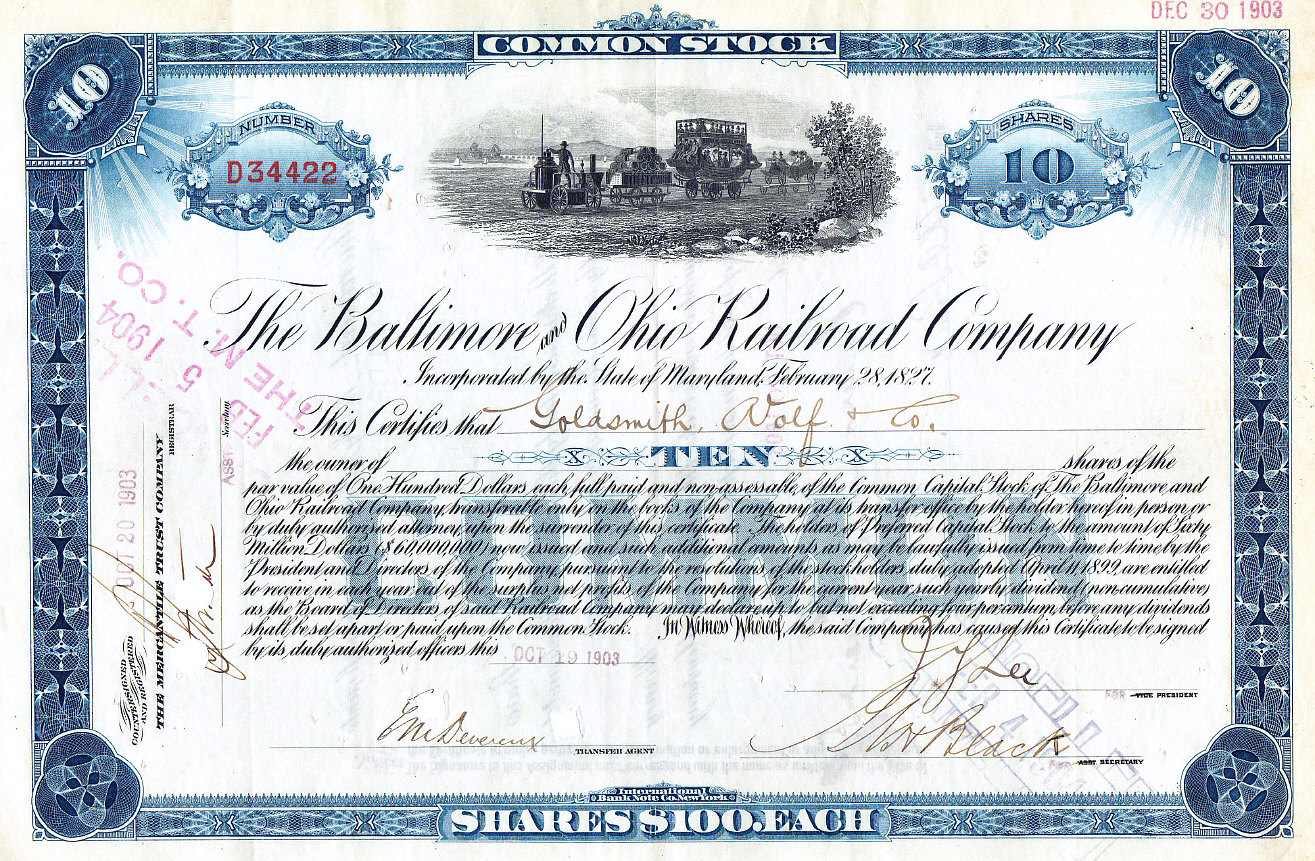
Baltimore and Ohio Railroad

There are many factors that determine value of a certificate. These include condition, age, historical significance, signatures, rarity, demand for the item, aesthetics, the type of company, the original face value, bankers associated with the issuance, transfer stamps, cancellation markings, whether the certificate was issued or unissued, printers, and the type of engraving process.

== See also ==
- Stock certificate
