= Leniniana =

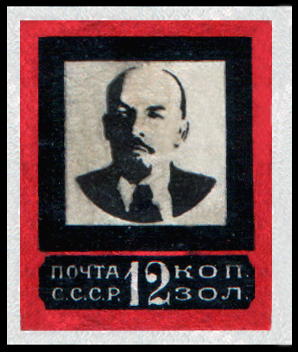
Soviet stamp from the Lenin Mourning Issue, 1924. Designed by Ivan Dubasov

In philately, Leniniana is a topic for collecting postage stamps that tell about the life and story of Vladimir Lenin (1870–1924) or people, places, etc. connected with him. The topic was common in the Soviet Union.

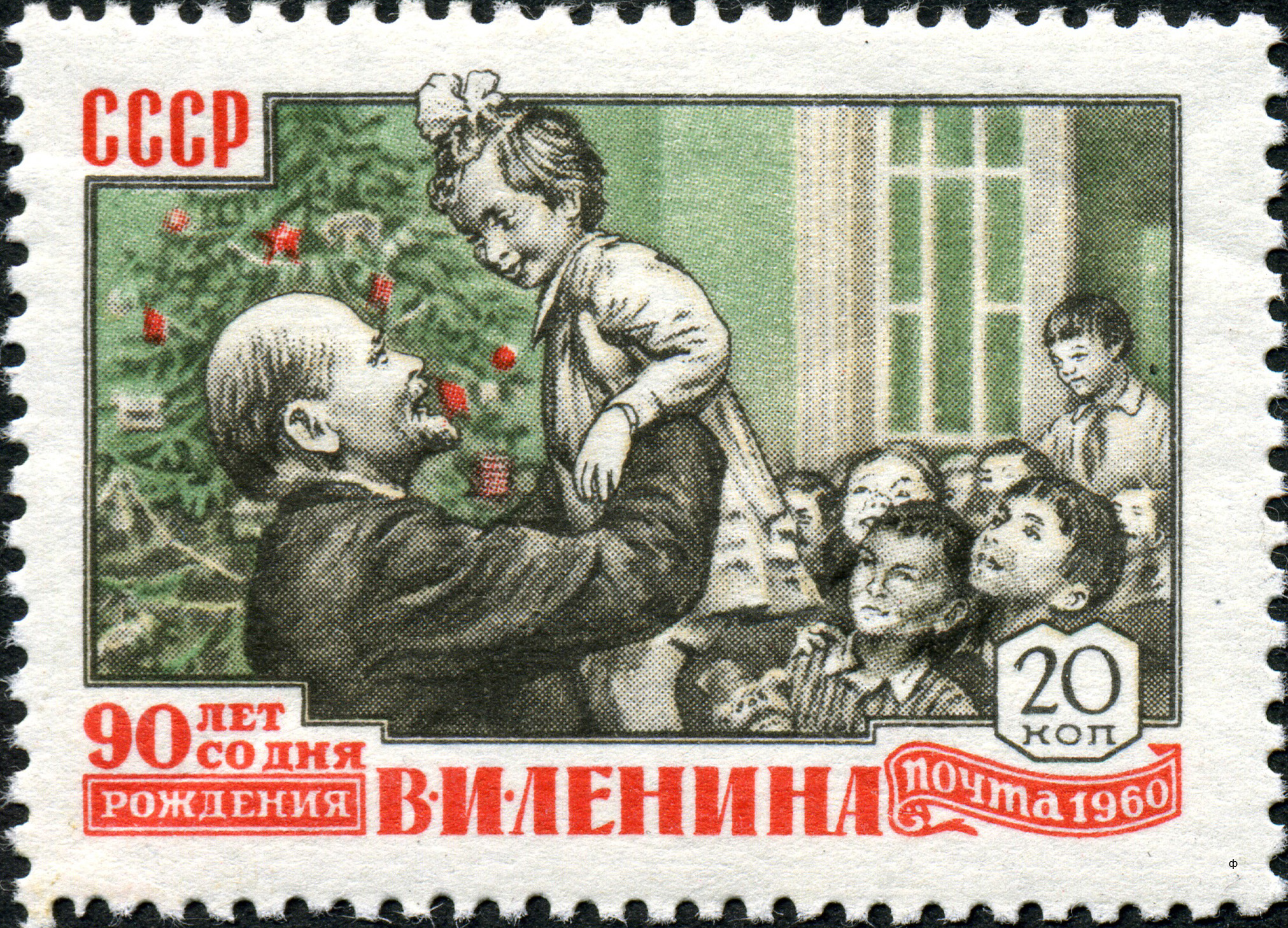
Soviet stamp commemorating the 90th birth anniversary of Vladimir Lenin, 1960. Designed after a drawing of Nikolay Zhukov

On the stamps of the USSR, Lenin was most frequently portrayed among the Bolsheviks. After 1923, his pictures were present on about 11% of all Soviet stamps. Lenin portrait first appeared on a stamp series that was the Mourning issue printed immediately after his death in 1924. Images of the first Soviet leader soon became ubiquitous.

Because of various Lenin representations on postage stamps, it is hardly possible to categorise them all. Among different ways and roles in which Lenin was shown, there were:

- his simple portraits,
- Lenin as a child and youth,
- Lenin as the organiser of the Communist Party of the Soviet Union,
- Lenin as the founder of the first socialist state,
- Lenin as the organiser of the Party press,
- Lenin as an inspirer of Soviet organisations and activities, etc.

There was even a stamp depicting Vladimir Lenin near a New Year's tree celebrating the holiday with children.

Stamp labels from the 100th birth anniversary issue, 1970

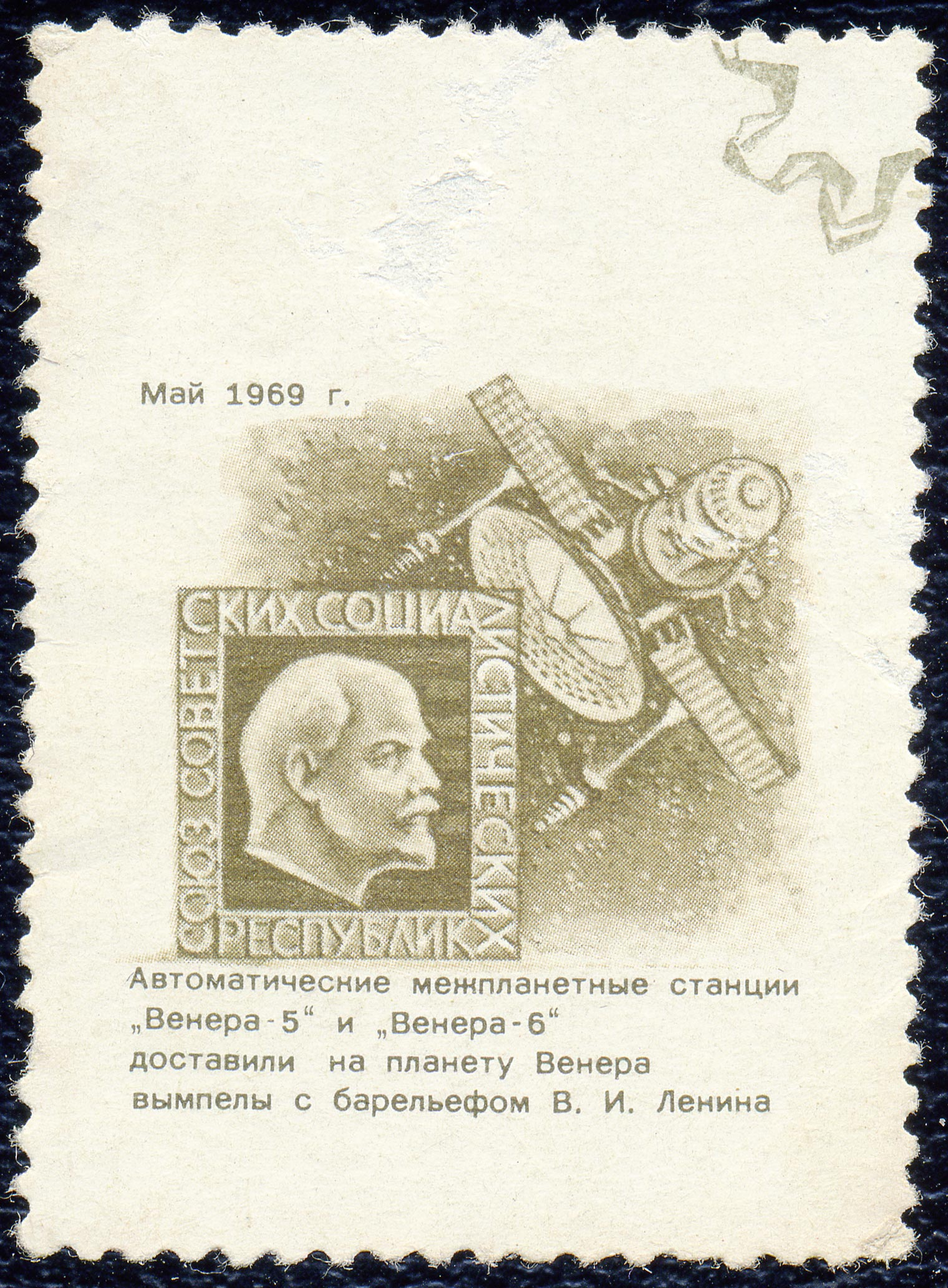
Venera 5 space station

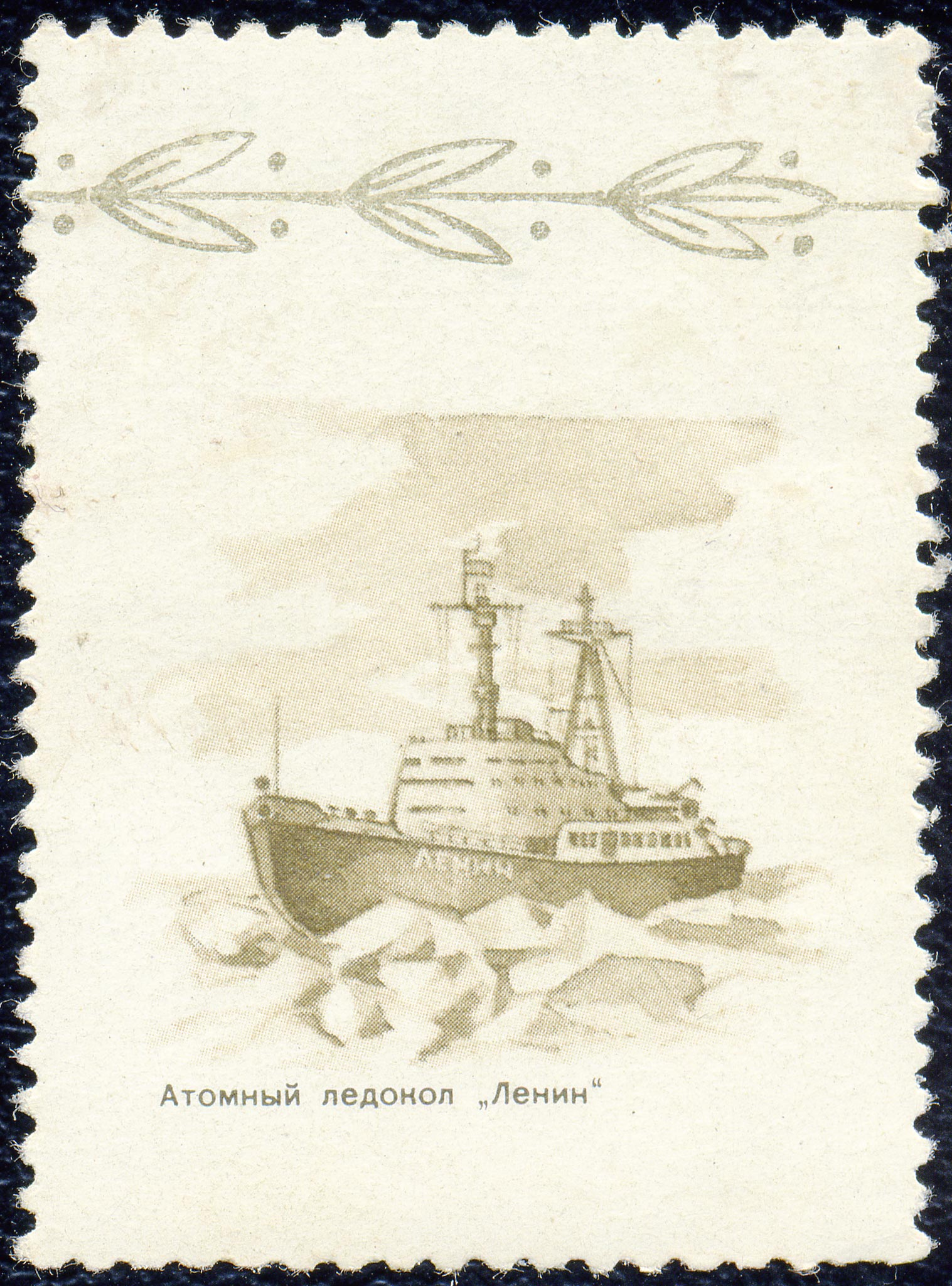
Atomic icebreaker Lenin

== See also ==
- Definitive stamps of the Soviet Union
- Stamps of the Soviet Union
