= Roman Longva =

Roman Voytsekhovich Longva
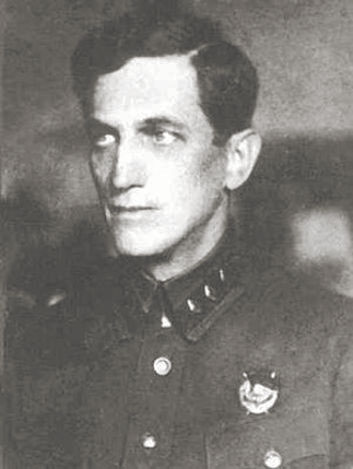
- Corps Commander Roman Longva
- Born: July 9, 1891; Varshava, Polish Tsardom, Russian Empire
- Died: February 8, 1938 (aged 46); Moskva, Union of Soviet Socialist Republics
- Military career
- Allegiance: Russian Empire; Russian Socialist Federative Soviet Republic; Union of Soviet Socialist Republics
- Branch: Infantry; Communication Troops
- Service years: 1914–1917; 1917–1922; 1922–1937
- Rank: Staff Captain; Corps Commander
- Commands: Communication Department of the Workers' and Peasants' Red Army
- Known for: Serviceman
- Wars: First World War; Civil War in Rossiya; Soviet–Polish War; Civil Wars in China
- Awards: Order of the Red Banner; Order of the Red Star

Roman Voytsekhovich Longva (July 9, 1891 – February 8, 1938) was a Polish revolutionary, Soviet military commander and military intelligence official, Corps Commander (November 20, 1935). Head of the Communication Department of the Workers' and Peasants' Red Army (1935–1937).

== Biography ==
Roman Voytsekhovich Longva was born in 1891 in Varshava, into a family of a merchant. Polyak. Even in his youth he became involved in revolutionary activities. For participating in school unrest he was expelled from the Varshava City School. Later, for anti–religious speeches, he was expelled from the Varshava Commercial School, which he later managed to graduate from as an external student in 1910. He was a member of the Union of Young Socialists of Polsha. Since 1910 he was a member of the Polish Socialist Party – Left. In 1910 he actively participated in the creation of the Socialist Union of Polsha (from 1911 he was the secretary of its central leadership). In March 1912, he was arrested by the police in connection with a youth political organization. At the beginning of September 1913, the Special Presence of the Varshava Court sentenced him to 6 months of imprisonment. He served his sentence in Lomzha Prison. After his release, he returned to Varshava and continued his revolutionary work in the Polish Socialist Party – Left.

In November 1914 he was drafted into the Russian Imperial Army and sent to serve in the 58th Reserve Infantry Battalion (Voronezh). In 1915 he graduated from the accelerated course of the Alekseevskiy Military School. Participant of the First World War. After being promoted to officer, he fought in the 66th Butyrskiy Infantry Regiment on the Northern Front as a junior company officer and company commander. After the February Revolution, he conducted revolutionary agitation among soldiers and non–commissioned officers of Polish nationality. In August 1917, during the Kornilov's Uprising, at the head of his regiment's soldiers, he disrupted the transfer of troops loyal to General Lavr Kornilov to Petrograd. Soon he actually left the regiment, already having the rank of Staff Captain, and was in Petrograd. He actively participated in the October Revolution in Petrograd, led an armed detachment and occupied the building of the Central Telegraph Office and a number of government institutions, and was appointed Commandant of the Post and Telegraph Offices of Petrograd.

From December 1917 – Head of the Polish Military Department in the People's Commissariat for Nationality Affairs of the Russian Socialist Federative Soviet Republic. With a large group of Polyaks from among former soldiers, he went to the Western Front, where he took an active part in the liquidation of the mutiny of the 1st Polish Corps of General Dovbor–Musnitskiy.

Became a member of the Russian Communist Party (Bolsheviks) in 1918. Participant in the Civil War. From June 1918, he was the Chief of Staff of the Western Infantry Division, initially formed from former soldiers of Polish Units, including internationalists from the Polish Dovbor–Musnitskiy's Corps who had gone over to the side of the Workers' and Peasants' Red Army. From August 1918 he commanded the 1st Brigade of this division (in September 1918 it was renamed the Western Rifle Division). At first, he led the brigade as part of the Western Army, and at the beginning of 1919, the brigade was transferred to the 9th Army, and it fought on the Southern Front against the troops of Generals Pyotr Krasnov and Anton Denikin. From February 1919 – Chief of the Western Rifle Division, which in July was transformed into the 52nd Rifle Division; under the command of Roman Longva, the division, as part of the Lithuanian–Belorussian Army, fought as part of the Western Front and participated in the Soviet–Polish War in the Minsk–Molodechno–Baranovichi Regions.

From September 1919 to August 1920, he was the commander of the 2nd Tula Rifle Division, which fought as part of the 7th, 15th and 16th Armies on the Western Front. He led the division in battles during the Defense of Petrograd (it distinguished itself in the capture of Yamburg) and in battles against the Estonian Army on the Plyussa and Narova Rivers (December 1919). In January–April 1920, the division was transferred to the Labor Army, harvesting peat and timber for Petrograd in the Petrograd Guberniya. From April the division fought against the Latvian Army, and in June 1920 it was urgently replenished and transferred to the Polish Front. There Longva particularly distinguished himself in the offensive from the Berezina to the Visla during the July Operation, where, having fought for hundreds of kilometers, the division took Svisloch, Osipovichi, Bobruysk, Slutsk, Brest–Litovsk, Pruzhany and other cities. During the capture of the fortified Bobruysk Region, the 14th Great Polsha Division suffered a heavy defeat. During the capture of the city of Brest–Litovsk on August 1, 1920, together with units of the 10th Rifle Division, numerous Polish military warehouses and 1 armoured train were captured intact. For these battles he was nominated for the Order of the Red Banner (awarded at the end of 1921). From August 4, 1920, he formed the 1st Polish Red Army, and on August 15, 1920, he was appointed its commander. However, due to the end of the Soviet–Polish War, the formation of the army was stopped in September 1920.

From November 1920 to November 1921 he was the Head of the Intelligence Directorate of the Field Headquarters of the Revolutionary Military Council of the Republic. From November 1921 to November 1924 – Chief of the Intelligence Department of the Headquarters of the Armed Forces of Ukraina and Krym, First Assistant to the Chief of Staff of the Kiev (from June 1922 – Ukrainian) Military District, in 1924 he temporarily served as Chief of Staff of the district. From November 1924 to August 1926, he was at the disposal of the Revolutionary Military Council of the Union of Soviet Socialist Republics. At that time, he was in China, where he served as Secretary of the Chinese Commission of the Political Bureau of the Central Committee of the All–Union Communist Party (Bolsheviks), and then as Secretary of the Andrey Bubnov's Commission in China under the National Revolutionary Army of China. In August 1926, he officially took up the position of military attaché at the plenipotentiary representation of the Union of Soviet Socialist Republics in China. From August 1927 – Commander and Military Commissar of the 43rd Rifle Division in the Belorussian Military District. In 1929, he was sent on a business trip to Germany, while officially remaining in charge of the division.

From July 1930 – Inspector of the Communication Troops, from February 1933 – Deputy Chief of the Communication Department of the Workers' and Peasants' Red Army, from October 1935 – Chief of the Communication Department of the Workers' and Peasants' Red Army.

Arrested on May 21, 1937. Sentenced to capital punishment by the Military Collegium of the Supreme Court of the Union of Soviet Socialist Republics on February 8, 1938, on charges of participating in a military–fascist conspiracy. Shot on the same day.

Rehabilitated by the Decision of the Military Collegium of the Supreme Court of the Union of Soviet Socialist Republics on September 15, 1956.

== Awards ==
- Order of the Red Banner (December 12, 1921);
- Order of the Red Star (August 13, 1936; for excellent work and outstanding achievements related to the construction of the ANT–25 Aircraft, its testing and the organization of the Moskva – Nikolaevsk–on–Amur Flight across the Arctic Ocean and Kamchatka).

== Sources ==
- Nikolay Cherushev, Yuriy Cherushev. The Shot Elite of the Workers' and Peasants' Red Army (Army Commanders of the 1st and 2nd Ranks, Corps Commanders, Division Commanders and Their Equals): 1937–1941. Biographical Dictionary – Moskva: Kuchkovo Pole; Megapolis, 2012 – Pages 94–95 – 2000 Copies – ISBN 978-5-9950-0217-8
- Mikhail Alekseev, Aleksandr Kolpakidi, Valeriy Kochik. Encyclopedia of Military Intelligence. 1918–1945 – Moskva, 2012
- Aleksandr Kolpakidi, Dmitriy Prokhorov. Empire of the Main Intelligence Directorate (Book 2) – Moskva: 2000
- Panteleymon Selivanov. Corps Commander Roman Longva (On the 75th Anniversary of His Birth) // Military History Journal – 1966 – No. 7 – Pages 126–128
