= Nikolay Gapich =

Soviet military leader

Nikolay Ivanovich Gapich
- Николай Иванович Гапич
- Born: May 9, 1901; Village of Novaya Alekseevka, Blagoveshchensky District, Amur Oblast
- Died: March 16, 1964 (aged 62)
- Military career
- Allegiance: White movement Soviet Union
- Branch: Signal corps
- Service years: Russian State (1919–1920); Soviet Union (1920–1941)
- Rank: Private; Major General of the Signal Corps
- Commands: Communications Department of the Workers' and Peasants' Red Army
- Conflicts: Russian Civil War; World War II; Eastern Front
- Awards: Order of Lenin; Order of the Red Banner; Medal "For the Victory over Germany in the Great Patriotic War 1941–1945"

Nikolay Ivanovich Gapich (1901–1964) was a Soviet military leader, Major General of the Signal Corps (June 4, 1940). Head of the Communications Department of the Workers' and Peasants' Red Army (1940–1941), he was repressed in 1941, released and rehabilitated in 1953.

== Early life and Civil War ==
Born on May 9, 1901, in the village of Novaya Alekseevka, Blagoveshchensky District, Amur Region, into a Russian peasant family. In 1916, he graduated from a two–year railway school, where he was educated as a telegraph operator, leading him to work on the railway as a telegraph operator–overseer.

In 1918 he was the station commissar for the Yerofey Pavlovich work settlement. In the autumn of the same year, he was arrested by the White Guards, then forcibly mobilized as a private in the army of Alexander Kolchak.

After the defeat of the Siberian Army, on February 4, 1920, he voluntarily joined the Red Army. He participated in the hostilities in Siberia, serving as a weapons instructor of a rifle regiment, then, beginning on February 15, as adjutant of the head of communications of the Trans–Baikal front and rear, after which he became head of communications of the railway department of the Eastern Transbaikalian Front on May 23.

In June 1920, he was sent to the Southwestern Front, where he was appointed chief of communications for the front's railway sector, then company commander of the 8th Infantry Division.

From June 1921, he again fought in Siberia with the troops of the Far Eastern Republic against the Japanese interventionists, participating in the suppression of the West Siberian uprising, first in June as commander of a communications company, then as commander of a telegraph platoon of this company and assistant commander of a communications division. Afterwards in August he served as Assistant to the Chief of Communications of the 3rd Amur Rifle Division; in September he became Chief of Communications of the Special Amur Rifle Regiment, then in October the assistant and temporary acting commander of the telegraph company of the headquarters of the Commander–in–Chief of Siberia Vasily Shorin. He was reassigned in November to the position of assistant commander of the 1st Separate Telegraph–Construction Company.

== Interwar period ==
After the end of hostilities, he continued to serve in the Far East. In April 1922 he became head of the communications team of the 2nd Separate Rifle Battalion of the border troops. From August 1922 he served as platoon commander of the 1st Communications Company. Then he served in the newly formed 1st Trans–Baikal Infantry Division: from September 1922 as assistant regiment commander for the technical part, and from November 1923 as assistant to the division's communications chief. Beginning in May 1924 he was the head of the communications team of the 1st Chita Rifle Regiment, and from November of the same year he was the commander of the communications platoon of the same regiment. Then he studied at the Vladivostok infantry school, after which in November 1925, he was appointed commander of a separate communications company of the 1st Rifle Division.

On October 1, 1927, he was enrolled as a student at the main faculty of the Mikhail Frunze Military Academy, from which he graduated on May 1, 1930, and in the same month was appointed chief of staff of the 9th Communications Regiment in the Belorussian Military District. From January 1931, he served as assistant chief of communications of the Belorussian Military District, and in April he was approved in this position. From December 30, 1932, to February 22, 1936 he was Chief of the Signal Corps of the Belorussian Military District.

Beginning in October 1936 he studied at the Academy of the General Staff of the Workers' and Peasants' Red Army. In June 1938, he graduated from the Academy, and remained there as a teacher in the Department of Operational Art, where he became senior lecturer of the same department in April 1940. Here Gapich prepared several textbooks on the communications service, scientific works and received the title of associate professor of the Academy.

On July 26, 1940, he was appointed head of the Communications Department of the Workers' and Peasants' Red Army. Having familiarized himself with the state of affairs in the Directorate, he came to the conclusion that the army suffered from a huge shortage of communications equipment. From October 1940 to June 1941, he repeatedly addressed reports on the need to urgently rectify matters to People's Commissar of Defense Semyon Timoshenko, Chiefs of the General Staff Kirill Meretskov and Georgy Zhukov, and Chairman of the Defense Committee under the Council of People's Commissars of the Soviet Union Kliment Voroshilov, but the measures he proposed were not implemented. As a result, from the first days of the Great Patriotic War, the lack of proper communication at all levels of troops became one of the important reasons for losses in command and control of troops and military defeats.

== Great Patriotic War, arrest, repression ==
Gapich was dismissed from office on July 22, 1941. According to the memoirs of the future Marshal of the Signal Corps Ivan Peresypkin, this happened during the report of Nikolai Gapich to Joseph Stalin on the state of communications in the troops. A few days later, he was appointed Chief of Communications of the Front of the Reserve Armies, arrived at the front, but did not manage to take office. The front was reorganized into the Reserve Front, and the new front commander, Georgy Zhukov, who arrived, appointed General Ivan Bulychev as the front commander, and Gapich as his deputy.

Gapich was arrested on August 6, 1941, following which he was subjected to a prolonged investigation. At first, he was accused of criminal leadership in the work of his administration, charging him with failing to supply the army with the required means of communication, neglecting the needs of the front and failing to establish uninterrupted communication with the fronts. The authorities then added the accusation of participation in a "military–fascist conspiracy".

After being subjected to torture, he denounced himself and admitted that since 1935 he was a member of an anti-Soviet organization in the Belarusian Military District headed by Ieronim Uborevich. Even later, accusations were added of working for Japanese intelligence during the Civil War.

Gapich subsequently retracted all confessions. In view of their complete absurdity, the charges of conspiracy and espionage were dropped from him. By order of the People's Commissariat of Defense of the Soviet Union on January 29, 1944, he was dismissed from the Red Army.

After spending 11 years in prison while under investigation, on August 26, 1952, he was sentenced by the Military Collegium of the Supreme Court of the Soviet Union to 10 years in a correctional labour camp under Article 193, paragraph 17. By the decree of the Council of Ministers of the Soviet Union of October 2, 1952, he was deprived of the military rank "Major General". To serve his sentence, he was sent to the city of Nizhneudinsk, Irkutsk Oblast, where he worked as a foreman in felling.

He was released in July 1953 and rehabilitated on July 28, 1953. On August 15 of the same year, the Council of Ministers of the Soviet Union canceled its decision to deprive Nikolay Gapich of his military rank, and he was reinstated in the Soviet Army. After being at the disposal of the Main Personnel Directorate of the Ministry of the Armed Forces of the Soviet Union, he was transferred to the reserve on October 21, 1953, for health reasons. He lived in Moscow, where he worked in the apparatus of the Ministry of Communications of the Soviet Union since 1956 as the head of inspection services, then from 1961 as the head of the 1st Department.

He was buried at the Golovinskoye Cemetery in Moscow.

== Military ranks ==
- Colonel (January 29, 1936);
- Brigade Commander (April 2, 1940);
- Major general (June 4, 1940).

== Awards ==
- Order of Lenin (1953);
- Order of the Red Banner (1941);
- Medal "For the Victory over Germany in the Great Patriotic War 1941–1945"

== Sources ==
- Command and Control Personnel of the Red Army in 1940–1941: Structure and Personnel of the Central Apparatus of the People's Commissariat of Defense of the Soviet Union, Military Districts and Combined–Arms Armies: Documents and Materials / Edited by Vladimir Kuzelenkov – Moscow–Saint Petersburg: Summer Garden, 2005 – Page 128 – 1000 Copies – ISBN 5-94381-137-0
- Nikolay Cherushev, Yuri Cherushev. The Executed Elite of the Workers' and Peasants' Red Army (Commanders of the 1st and 2nd Ranks, Corps Commanders, Division Commanders and Their Peers): 1937–1941. Biographical Dictionary – Moscow: Kuchkovo Field; Megapolis, 2012 – Pages 447–448 – 496 Pages – 2000 Copies – ISBN 978-5-9950-0217-8
- Denis Soloviev. All of Stalin's Generals. Volume 3 – Moscow, 2019 – ISBN 978-5532106444 – Pages 41–42
