= Communication and Information Systems Groups =

The Communication and Information Systems Groups (Gp CIS), known until 2002 as the Transmission Troops or TTr (Dutch: Transmissietroepen, French: Troupes de Transmissions), are the military communications units of the Land Component of the Belgian Armed Forces. They operate and maintain secure communications and information systems at strategic, operational and tactical level.

Each brigade headquarters was also supported by its own HQ company that included a Transmission platoon. In 2002, the brigade headquarters Transmission platoons were disbanded, and the independent Transmission units transformed into Groups CIS (Gp CIS). To support the brigades and subordinate units, five Groups CIS were established:

- 2nd Group CIS in Sint-Niklaas (disbanded)
- 4th Group CIS in Marche-en-Famenne
- 5th Group CIS in Tournai (disbanded)
- 6th Group CIS in Vilvoorde
- 10th Group CIS in Leopoldsburg

With the Transformation Plan of the Belgian Army and establishment of the Medium Brigade, the 2nd Group CIS and 5th Group CIS were disbanded in 2011, and its personnel was transferred to either the 6th Group CIS or the 4th Group CIS.

On November 22, 2018, the Medium Brigade was restructured into the Motorized Brigade that included both the 4th Group CIS and 10th Group CIS. The 6th Group CIS was integrated into the Special Operations Regiment (SOR).

== Sources ==
- De Gemotoriseerde Brigade retrieved October 23, 2023.
- Gemotoriseerde Brigade ziet het levenslicht, establishment Motorized Brigade on 22 November 2018, (archived) retrieved July 15, 2019.
- Opendeur Motorized Brigade Leopoldsburg, list with units Moterized Brigade, retrieved October 23, 2023.
- 4 Groep CIS traint interoperabiliteit, Capacité Motorisée (CaMo) training with French units, retrieved October 23, 2023.
- Special Operations Regiment viert meerdere verjaardagen, units of Belgian SOR, retrieved October 23, 2023.
- Belgische Kamer van Volksvertegenwoordigers QRVA 19698-19699 Questions Belgian Chamber of Representatives - Management Network and data communication systems by CIS, page 60-61, retrieved October 24, 2023.
- Provincie Oost-Vlaanderen - Motie militaire kwartieren Westakkers Motion preservation Westakkers military quarters Sint-Niklaas, retrieved October 24, 2023.
- Chambre des Représentants de Belgique QRVA Rélocalisation du 5e CIS de Tournai CRABV 52 COM 540) Belgian Chamber of Representatives - Question No 11959, pages 7-8, on the disbanding of the 5e CIS Tournai, retrieved October 24, 2023.
