= Communication Troops of the Ministry of Defense of the Soviet Union =

Specialized communication forces of the Soviet Ministry of Defense

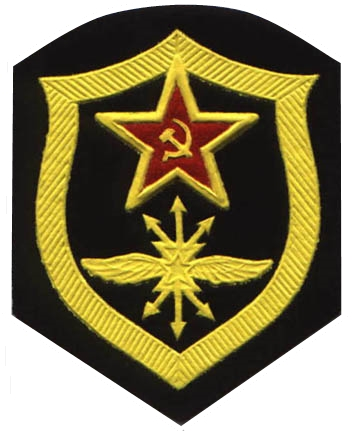
- Patch of Communication Troops
- Active: October 20, 1919 – May 7, 1992
- Country: Soviet Union
- Type: Communication Troops
- Part of: Armed Forces of the Soviet Union
- Garrison/HQ: Subordination: to the Chief of the Communication Troops of the Ministry of Defense of the Soviet Union
- Engagements: Civil War; Battles at Lake Khasan (1938); Battles on Khalkhin Gol (1939); Soviet–Finnish War; Great Patriotic War; Soviet–Japanese War; Afghan War

The Communication Troops of the Ministry of Defense of the Soviet Union were generalized names for special-purpose forces intended for the deployment and operation of communication systems in order to provide command and control of troops and forces subordinate to the Ministry of Defense of the Soviet Union in all types of their activities.

As a branch of the specialised forces, the Communication Troops were an integral part of all five branches of the Armed Forces of the Soviet Union (the Ground Forces, the Navy, the Air Force, the Air Defense Forces and the Strategic Missile Forces).

The general command of the Communication Troops of all five branches of the armed forces was carried out by the Chief of the Communication Troops of the Ministry of Defense of the Soviet Union.

The Communication Troops, which were part of the Internal Troops of the Ministry of Internal Affairs of the Soviet Union, the Border Troops and the Government Communication Troops of the State Security Committee of the Soviet Union (KGB), were not part of the Communication Troops of the Ministry of Defense of the Soviet Union.

Much of the infrastructure and units of the Communications Troops were inherited by the Russian Signal Troops.

== History ==
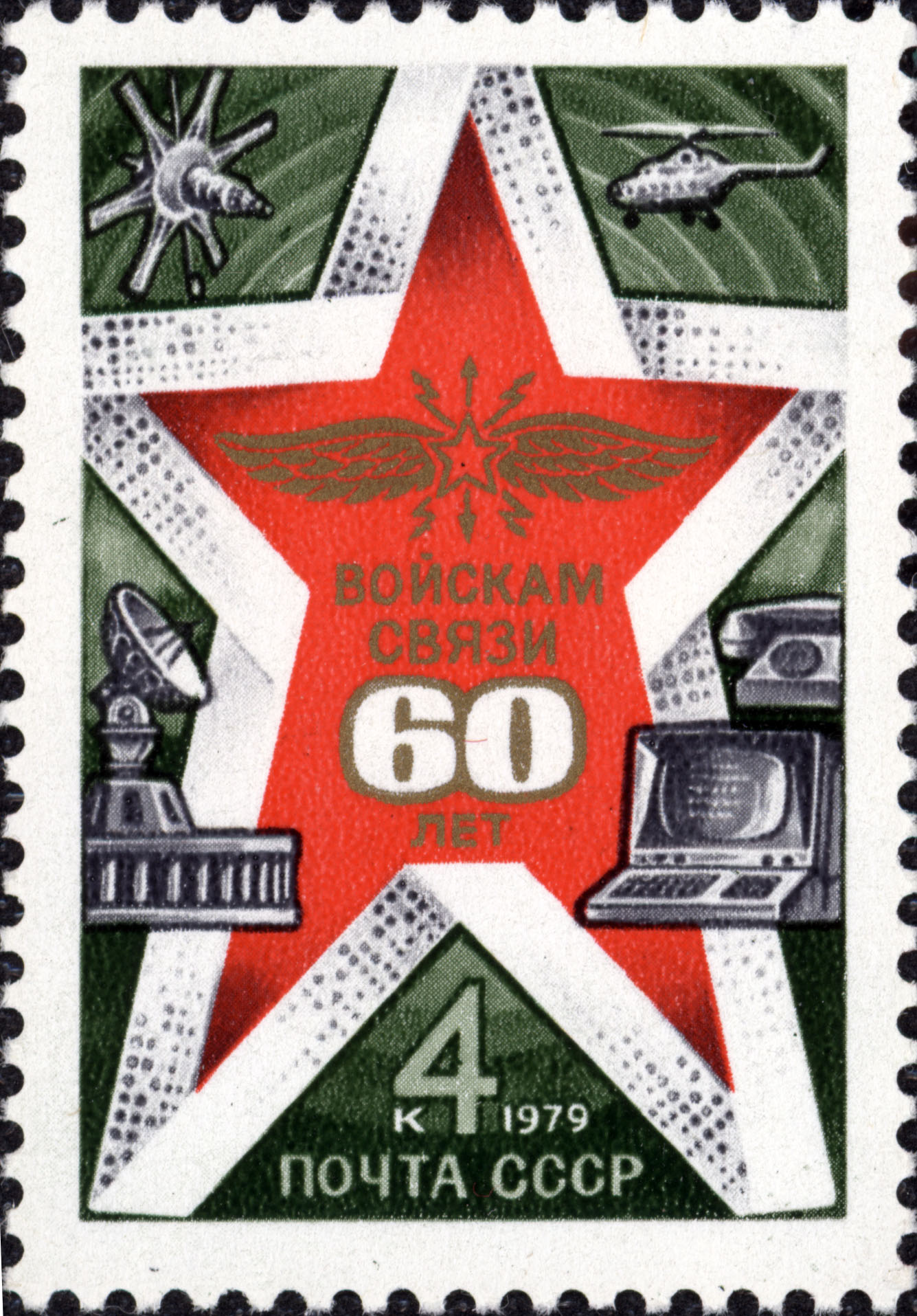
"60 Years of the Communication Troops". Postage Stamp of the Soviet Union. 1979

The emblem for the buttonholes of the Communication Troops, introduced in 1936

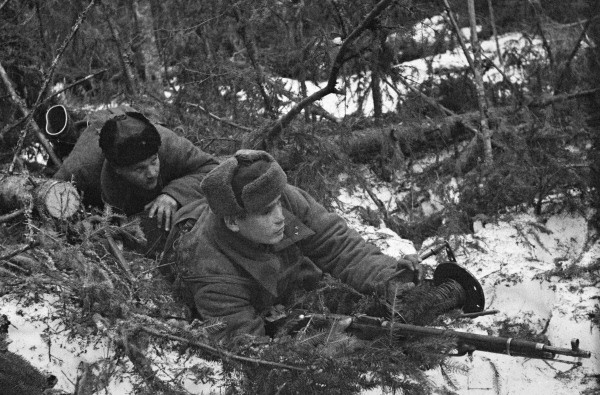
Signalers are laying a telephone cable in the forest. Photo by Boris Vdovenko. November 1942

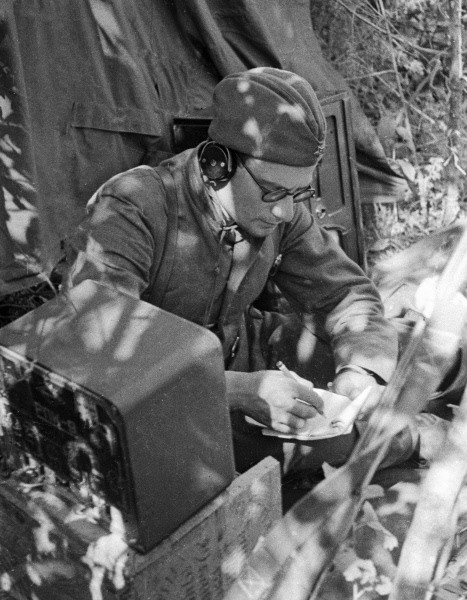
The radio operator receives a report from the Soviet Information Bureau. Photo by Sergey Loskutov. June 1942

=== Civil War ===
After the October Revolution, in the context of the outbreak of civil war and military intervention, in order to protect the Soviet Republic, the creation of the first units of the Red Army began. In the first half of 1918, measures were taken to create a system of governing bodies of the Red Army.

On April 20, 1918, order No. 294 of the People's Commissariat for Military and Naval Affairs was issued, which determined the staff of the rifle division. In this state, a place was allocated for a separate communications battalion with a personnel of 977 people, and in rifle regiments – communications teams. The battalion commander combined the position of divisional communications commander, respectively, the regimental communications team commander – regiment communications commander. The lack of personnel, transport and equipment prevented the implementation of these steps.

In November 1918, new staffs were introduced for the communications battalion of the rifle division, the communications company for the rifle brigade and the communications command for the rifle regiment. According to the new states, the communications battalion of the division and the communications teams of the rifle sections had less communications, transport and personnel, which made it possible to put them into practice.

In December 1918, communications units began to be created in the military aviation and cavalry.

The difference from the organizational structure of the troops of the Russian Empire was the independence of the battalions and communications teams, which, as in the tsarist period, were not included in the engineering troops.

In October 1918, the issue of centralized management of radio communications in the Red Army was resolved, for which the position of a radiotelegraph inspector was established, subordinate to the headquarters of the Revolutionary Council of the Republic in operational terms and to the chief of the Main Military Engineering Directorate in technical terms. At the same time, on all fronts, the post of inspector of the front radiotelegraph was introduced, and in the combined arms armies – the head of the army radiotelegraph. At the headquarters of the front, post and telegraph departments of the People's Commissariat of Post and Telegraph were created (they provided postal communication and communication via permanent communication lines). The supply of the Red Army with communications equipment was assigned to the Main Military Engineering Directorate.

On October 20, 1919, by Order No. 1736/362 of the Revolutionary Military Council, the Communications Directorate of the Red Army was created, headed by the Chief of Communications of the Red Army, as well as the communications directorate of fronts and armies, communications departments in divisions and brigades. Thus, the official registration of the unification of the communications leadership of the Red Army into a harmonious system took place. October 20, 1919 became the birthday of the communication troops of the Armed Forces of the country, as independent special forces. The Communications Directorate of the Red Army was responsible for organizing and maintaining communications between the Revolutionary Military Council of the Republic and the Field Headquarters of the Red Army with the fronts and armies, the formation of communications units, their staffing, training, provision of equipment and other equipment. Artemy Lyubovich (formerly People's Commissar of Posts and Telegraphs) was appointed the first head of the Red Army's Communications Department; from September 1920 to April 1924, Innokenty Khalepsky was the head of the Red Army's Communications Department (formerly the head of communications of the Caucasian Front), who did a lot for the formation and development of the communications troops.

The Communications Department of the Workers' and Peasants' Red Army was responsible for organizing and maintaining communications between the Revolutionary Council and the field headquarters of the Red Army with the fronts and armies, the formation of communications units, their staffing, training, provision of equipment and other property.

By December 1920, the communication troops consisted of 13 separate battalions and 46 communication battalions of divisions and brigades, a large number of companies and communications teams, warehouses, workshops and other units and subunits. The personnel of the troops exceeded 100,000 people.

During the hostilities of the Civil War, general provisions for organizing communications at all levels of the Red Army were worked out, the main responsibilities of communications officials were defined, and ways of organizing communications by various means were developed. Continuously progress was made in the organizational structure of the linear and nodal units and communications units. For the first time in the history of military communications, communications trains were used to control the troops of the Red Army.

The activities of the communication troops during the Civil War were highly appreciated in a special order of the Revolutionary Military Council of the Republic of February 17, 1921, which noted: "The heroic Red Army, which covered itself with unfading glory, owes much to the communication troops, who performed during the long struggle against enemies and had big and responsible tasks".

At the end of hostilities, the communication troops were reduced to 32,600 people. The armament was mainly outdated and worn–out communication equipment of foreign production. Great difficulties in organizing communications were caused by the multi–type and deterioration of communications equipment. The issue of improving military communications has become topical.

By order of the Revolutionary Military Council of June 6, 1920, under the head of communications of the Red Army, a full–time Military–Technical Communications Council was established, which was responsible for making decisions on all the main issues of organizing and developing military communications, including the management of scientific research and the creation of new technical means, as well as resolution of current pressing issues.

=== Interwar period ===
After the persistent efforts of the Chief of Communications of the Red Army, Innokenty Khalepsky, the Revolutionary Military Council of the Republic on April 15, 1923, established the Research Institute of the Military–Technical Communications Council of the Workers' and Peasants' Red Army (now the 16th Central Research and Testing Institute). A scientific center appeared in the communication troops, which, on the basis of constant analysis of scientific and technical achievements in the country and the world, began to search for and military–technical substantiation of specific ways of their use in military communications. From the first days of its formation to the present time, the institute has become a reliable support for the leadership of the communication troops in the formation and implementation of technical policy in the field of improving and developing systems and technical complexes of military communications. On the basis of research by the institute and the country's communications industry (including its own personnel) in the pre–war period, the first generation of military field radio stations, telephone and telegraph devices, switching devices, communication cables, ground electronic reconnaissance equipment with which the Red Army entered into the Great Patriotic War. In terms of their technical level, these funds basically met the requirements of the troops of that time, but they were not enough. A significant number of obsolete communications equipment continued to remain in the Red Army. The problem of providing troops with communications equipment became especially acute with the beginning of the massive deployment of the army and navy in the fall of 1939.

By the end of the 1920s, the communication troops remained qualitatively at the level of the final stage of the civil war. The subsequent industrialization of the country led to organizational and staff changes and an overall increase in the size of the Red Army, which was reflected in changes in the communication troops.

In 1924, the First Congress of the chiefs of communications of military districts, formations and commanders of communications units was held. The congress examined theoretical and practical issues of the development of military communications. The recommendations of the congress were included in the Field Manual of the Red Army in 1925, which outlined the main principles and methods of organizing communications by various means, the responsibilities of commanders and staffs for command and control of troops and communications.

In the early 1930s, the communication troops had in their composition (excluding corps and division battalions and communication squadrons):

- 9 separate communications regiments;
- 1 separate radio regiment;
- 12 separate radio battalions;
- 20 separate companies of rifle corps;
- 71 separate company of rifle divisions;
- 4 communications squadrons of the cavalry corps;
- 12 squadrons of cavalry divisions.

By June 1941, the communication troops were:

- 19 regiments (14 district and 5 army);
- 25 separate line communications battalions;
- 16 separate radio divisions (including special purpose divisions);
- 4 separate companies.

By the middle of 1941, the number of troops radio equipment was: in the General Staff – Front link up to 35%, in the Army – Corps link – 11%, in divisions – 62%, in regiments – 77%, in battalions – 58%. Of the total number of obsolete radio stations in the front–line radio networks were 75%, in the army – 24%, in the divisional – 89%, in the regimental – 63%. By this time, a set of communications units only of central and district subordination consisted of 19 separate communications regiments, 25 separate communications battalions and other units and organizations.

Communication warriors in the pre–war period took part in hostilities on the Chinese–Eastern Railway (1929), near Lake Khasan (1938), near the Khalkhin–Gol River (1939), in the liberation of Western Belarus and Western Ukraine (1939), in the Soviet–Finnish War (1939–1940). The communication troops from April 1924 to June 1941 were consistently led by Nikolai Sinyavsky, Roman Longva, Alexey Aksyonov, Ivan Naydenov, Nikolay Gapich.

=== Great Patriotic War ===
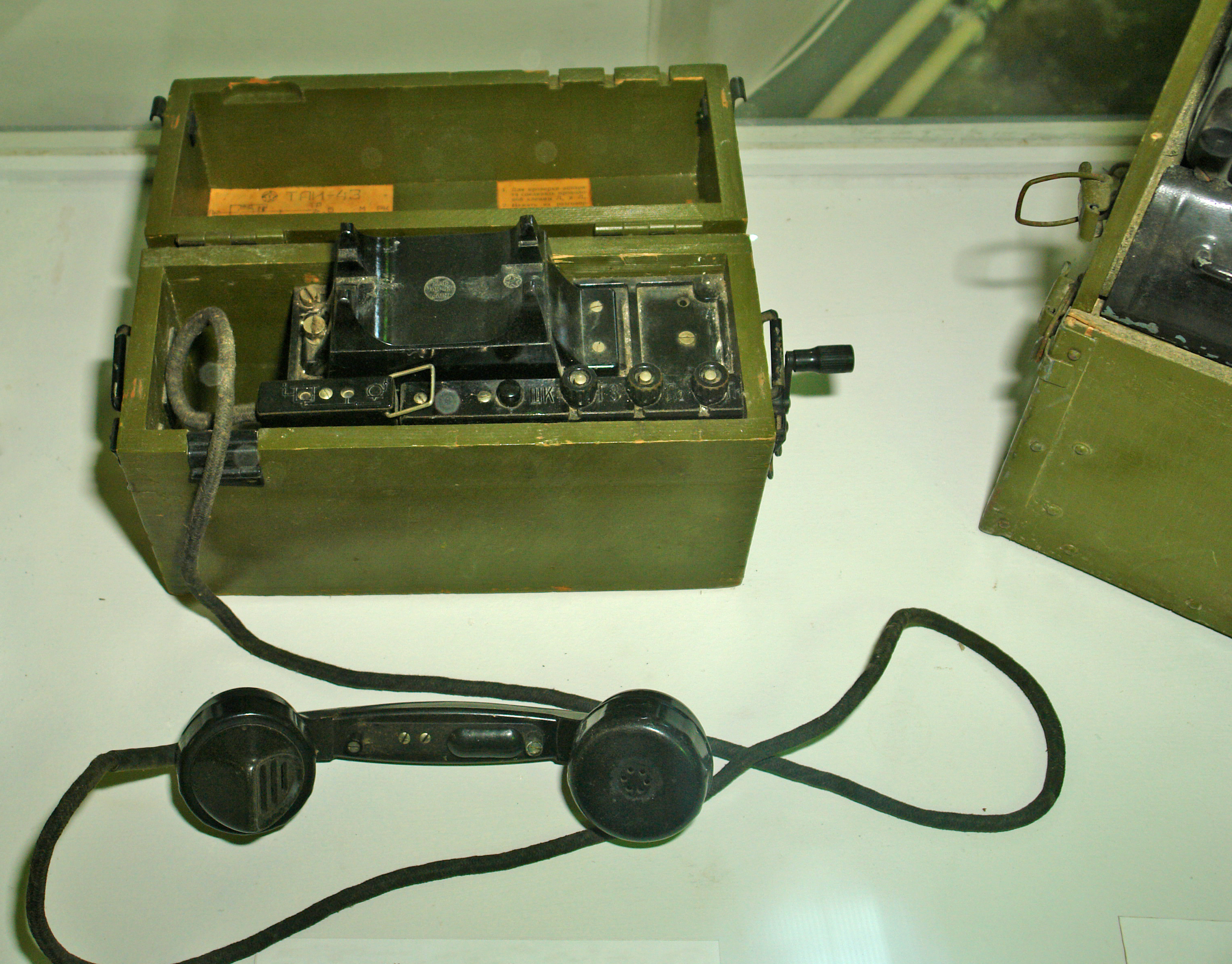
Field telephone TAI–43 during the Great Patriotic War

With the outbreak of hostilities in the Great Patriotic War, in connection with the urgent need to provide communications in all levels of the Red Army's command and control, the number of communication troops increased sharply. For this reason, on August 5, 1941, the Communications Department of the Red Army was reformed into the Main Communications Department of the Red Army.

In 1941, during the Great Patriotic War, by order of the People's Commissariat of Defense, the post of chief of the communications troops of the Workers' and Peasants' Red Army was created. In the first, most difficult period of the war, major shortcomings in the preparedness of the border areas with regard to communications, technical equipment and in the preparedness of the communication troops of the Workers' and Peasants' Red Army became obvious.

The basing of wire communications on the network of state permanent air lines allowed aviation and enemy saboteurs to disable it. Radio communications were neither organizationally nor financially prepared to ensure stable command and control of troops. In the conditions of retreat and the most difficult defensive battles, the formations and units of the Red Army were not fully equipped with communications units and subunits. The staffing and equipment of the communications units and subdivisions were extremely insufficient. These circumstances were one of the reasons for the failures of the Workers' and Peasants' Red Army in the initial period of the war. At the same time, the scale of the unfolding battles from the very beginning demanded the use of all the country's capabilities in the interests of ensuring communication with the troops.

In November 1942, special radio divisions, engaged in electronic reconnaissance, were allocated from the Communication Troops of the Red Army, which were transferred to the subordination of the People's Commissariat of Internal Affairs of the Soviet Union.

The experience of combat operations brought changes to the organization of the communication forces. So, in the period from May to August 1943, separate communication divisions of the Reserve of the Supreme Command and special–purpose communication centers were created to provide communication between representatives of the Headquarters of the Supreme High Command with the General Staff and with the headquarters of the fronts.

In order to centralize the leadership of communications in the country and the army, by the decision of the State Defense Committee of July 23, 1941, Colonel Ivan Peresypkin (since February 1944 – Marshal of the Communication Troops) was appointed Chief of Communications of the Red Army, who also retained the post of People's Commissar of Communications of the Soviet Union.

As new front–line and army directorates were formed, the need for communication troops and technical means for them continuously increased. During the first year of the war, under the energetic leadership of Ivan Peresypkin, over 1,000 new communications units were formed, schools and courses were created for the accelerated training of various specialists to meet the needs of the front in them.

Ivan Peresypkin managed to use all the resources and opportunities available in the country to establish mass production of communications equipment and supply them to the troops. As a result of all these efforts, it was possible to reverse the situation with providing communications for the active forces.

In 1942, the first portable domestic ultrashort–wave radio station A–7 with frequency modulation for rifle and artillery regiments was developed, which received very high praise in the troops.

A noticeable increase in the role of radio communications occurred already during the operations of the summer–autumn campaign of 1942.

The experience of military operations has convincingly shown that radio, especially in an offensive, is becoming the main, and often the only, means of communication providing command and control of troops.

In the course of the war, the equipment of troops with radio communications equipment increased sharply. In 1944, the industry supplied more than 64 thousand radio stations of all types to the troops.

Further improvement of communications control bodies, organizational and staff structure of formations, units and subdivisions of communications, an increase in their number took place.

New elements were introduced into the communications system of the General Staff – special–purpose communications centers, through which direct wire communications of the Supreme High Command Headquarters were provided with 2–4 fronts. Communication centers for special purposes were located 50–200 kilometers from the front line. Through them communication was also provided between adjacent fronts. Throughout the war, the proportion of signalmen in the total number of army personnel increased continuously.

By the end of 1944, separate communications brigades were created, consisting of several separate battalions, and additional communications centers were deployed. Due to the increase in the number of active fronts and the increase in the distance between the General Staff and the headquarters of the fronts, the number of communication units of the Supreme High Command Reserve increased significantly, and communication brigades of the Supreme High Command Reserve were formed.

By the end of the war, the Red Army had in its composition a large number of communication formations, the largest type of which was the communication regiment.

In total, by May 1945, the Communication Troops of the Red Army had:

- 125 communication regiments (of which 10 communication regiments of the Air Defense and 20 communication regiments of the Air Force);
- 300 separate communication battalions (excluding corps and divisional);
- About 500 separate communication companies.

6 regiments were awarded the rank of guards.

294 signalmen became Heroes of the Soviet Union, more than 100 signalmen became full holders of the Order of Glory. Many thousands of military signalmen were awarded orders and medals.

During the war, almost 600 communications units were awarded orders. A number of front–line and army communications units were awarded the title of Guards.

In 1944, the rank of communications marshal appeared (3 more generals were appointed marshals of troops after the war).

=== Post–war period ===
In connection with the post–war mass demobilization in the armed forces and the reduction of the armed forces in the period from 1945 to 1946, more than 300 communications units were disbanded (not counting those that were part of the corps and divisions).

In March 1946, the Main Directorate of Communications of the Red Army was reorganized into the Directorate of the Chief of Communications of the Ground Forces of the Armed Forces of the Soviet Union.

Also in 1946, the Special Forces of the Intelligence Directorate of the Workers' and Peasants' Red Army, which carried out radio intelligence, were returned to the subordination of the War Ministry from the structure of the People's Commissariat of Internal Affairs – People's Commissariat of State Security.

In April 1948, by a directive from the Minister of Defense of the Soviet Union, the Office of the Chief of Communication Troops of the Ground Forces was transformed into the Directorate of Communication Troops of the Soviet Army.

In October 1958, the Directorate of the Communication Troops of the Soviet Army was transformed into the Directorate of the Chief of the Communication Troops of the Ministry of Defense of the Soviet Union.

The main part of the formations and units of the Communication Troops supported the activities of the ground forces.

The generalization and analysis of the experience of the combat use of communication troops convincingly showed that success in operations and battles depends to a decisive extent on the quality of command and control, and command and control – on the state of technical equipment, capabilities and level of preparedness of the communication troops.

In the first post–war years in the communication troops of the Soviet Army, much attention was paid to the development and implementation into practice of new principles for organizing communications of operational formations and combined–arms formations on the basis of the richest experience of the Great Patriotic War, as well as the development and substantiation of operational–tactical requirements for new means and complexes of communications, capable of providing command and control in the new conditions of warfare.

Marshal Ivan Peresypkin at the end of 1944 set the task of starting work on the preparation of the first post–war weapons system for military communications.

In the late 40s and 50s, the troops began to receive new communication systems with qualitatively new tactical and technical characteristics.

Short–wave car radio stations were created for the radio networks of the General Staff, for front–line, for army (corps) radio networks, as well as for divisional networks and a tank radio station.

Portable ultra–short–wave radio stations were created, which provided search–free communication in the tactical control link with no tuning needed.

At the same time, technical means were created for a fundamentally new type of communication for the Soviet Army – radio relay communication (multichannel station R–400 and low–channel station R–401), as well as frequency multiplexing and channelization complexes, qualitatively new samples of telephone and telegraph equipment, switching devices, several types of field communication cables.

Equipping troops with radio relay stations was a qualitatively new stage in the development of communication systems of operational formations and combined–arms formations, increased their reliability, survivability and noise immunity, and also improved a number of other indicators. The introduction of new technology into the troops required a revision of the organizational and technical structure of communication centers. Based on the use of new means of communication, standard complexes of automobile control rooms were created for the formation of mobile field communication centers for various control points. For the first time, mobile communications units of industrial production began to enter service with the troops. The time for the deployment of such communication centers was sharply reduced, the mobility of communication systems in general increased significantly.

In the second half of the 50s, the rapid development of nuclear missile weapons began, and the qualitative improvement of other means of armed struggle began, which led to significant changes in the structure of the Armed Forces of the Soviet Union. These circumstances, in turn, necessitated the development of new methods of command and control of troops and weapons.

The period of the 60s, in general, is characterized by the beginning of practical work on the creation of automated complexes for command and control of troops and weapons (anti–aircraft, artillery and missile forces) and design work in the field of automation of control of the armed forces.

Increased requirements for communication systems and channels began to appear in terms of their stability, noise immunity, secrecy and timeliness in the transmission of information. The Communication Troops were successfully solving these complex new tasks.

With the retirement of Marshal of the Communication Troops Ivan Peresypkin in 1957, Alexei Leonov began to lead the Communication Troops (since 1961, Marshal of the Communication Troops). Under his leadership, work continued to improve the structure of the troops and create new means of communication.

The introduction of new short–wave and ultra–short–wave single–band radio stations of high and medium power has significantly increased the quality characteristics of radio communication channels in operational and operational–tactical levels of command and control.

Radio relay communications were further developed. Means were created for a new type of communication – tropospheric communication, which made it possible to provide high–quality multichannel communication directly between control points at a distance of up to 150–250 kilometers from each other (without retransmission).

In the 60s, the first practical work on the creation of satellite communication lines was launched. Complexes of unified compression and channeling equipment common for cable, radio relay and tropospheric communication lines, new means of telephone, telegraph and facsimile equipment, data transmission equipment and complexes of equipment for classifying information for various purposes were created.

Based on the use of a new generation of various communication technologies, a new generation of hardware field communication centers was created, as well as several types of command and staff vehicles on an automobile and armored transport base for commanders of motorized rifle (tank) regiments and battalions. Appropriate clarifications were also made to the organizational structure of the communication troops and to the system of training highly qualified command and engineering personnel.

The next stage in the development of the communication troops since 1970 is associated with the activities of Andrei Belov (in 1973, he was awarded the military rank of Marshal of the Communication Troops).

At the beginning of the 70s, on his initiative, a system of routine maintenance and controlled operation of communications equipment was developed and introduced into the troops. Vigorous measures were taken to solve the problem of managing the communication system itself and its elements.

The industry at that time did not produce technical means for equipping communications control posts. In this regard, the 16th Central Scientific Research Testing Institute of the Ministry of Defense of the Soviet Union was instructed to promptly develop and manufacture atypical complex equipment for communications control posts.

Based on the provisions of the theory and practice of the communication troops, it was concluded that it was necessary to create unified communication systems of large formations and formations while preserving the communication subsystems of the combat arms, special forces and services with a certain specificity of combat activities (reconnaissance, air defense and aviation, missile troops and artillery, rear and more). In this regard, and also taking into account the increasing role of communication systems and complexes in the management of the Armed Forces of the Soviet Union, on May 26, 1977, a directive of the General Staff No. 314/3/0534 was issued according to which the Office of the Chief of Communications of the Ministry of Defense of the Soviet Union was included in the General headquarters as the Office of the Chief of Communications of the Armed Forces of the Soviet Union. At the same time, the position of the head of this department began to be called as "Chief of Communications of the Armed Forces – Deputy Chief of the General Staff".

At the end of the 1970s, measures were taken to develop comprehensive research in scientific organizations of the Ministry of Defense and Industry to substantiate conceptual issues of the creation and operation of a promising automated communication system of the Armed Forces. Based on the results of these studies, the Central Committee of the Communist Party of the Soviet Union and the Council of Ministers of the Soviet Union in 1980 issued a special decree on the creation of a large cooperation of industrial and research organizations of the Ministry of Defense in order to launch work on the creation of a United Automated Communication System of the Armed Forces and the creation of technical equipment for it. At the same time, an automated front communications system, a unified satellite communications system of the Ministry of Defense (separately from the system of the Ministry of Communications – while maintaining the general system for launching spacecraft and command and measuring complexes) and promising technical means for them were created.

Measures were taken to develop comprehensive research in scientific organizations of the Ministry of Defense and Industry to substantiate conceptual issues of creating and operating a promising automated communication system of the Armed Forces. Based on the results of these studies, by a special resolution of the Central Committee of the Communist Party of the Soviet Union and the Council of Ministers of the Soviet Union in 1980, a large cooperation of industrial organizations and research organizations of the Ministry of Defense was created, work was launched on the development of a Joint Automated Communication System of the Armed Forces and the creation of complexes of technical means for it. At the same time, a unified satellite communications system of the Ministry of Defense and promising technical means for it were created.

To ensure the functioning of the developed automated control systems for the Armed Forces, troops and weapons, special data transmission systems were created. The creation of automated control systems has caused a significant increase in the requirements for the technical characteristics of communication facilities and the communication system as a whole.

In this regard, attention was constantly paid to the creation of new generations of basic communication means of general use and the modernization of some of the existing means. At the end of the 1980s, to ensure reliable radio communication at the tactical level, an automated complex of short–wave and ultra–short–wave radio stations R–163 (12 types) was created. At the end of the 1990s, to replace it, a perfect complex of noise–immune radio communications of the tactical level R–168 (17 types) entered the troops.

New promising radio relay stations for multichannel and low–channel communications were created, including the first domestic microwave radio relay communications, as well as new effective means of tropospheric communications.

== Communication Troops at the last stage of the existence of the Soviet Union ==
=== Classification of troops ===
The communication troops were classified according to the following main features:

- Belonging to the control system that they provided with communication:

- Communication troops of the General Staff (central subordination);
- Communication troops of the main headquarters of the branches of the Armed Forces;
- Communication troops of operational–strategic commands (fronts, groups, districts);
- Operational commands (armies and corps);
- Associations of the branches and services of the Armed Forces;
- Communication units of formations and subunits of the arms and services of the Armed Forces.

- Organizational composition:

- Formations – brigades;
- Separate units – regiments, battalions (field communication centers), companies (centers, platoons, squads and crews);
- Institutions – research institutes, etc.;
- Educational establishments;
- Repair factories, storage bases and warehouses.

- The functional purpose of formations, units and communications units:

- Nodal;
- Linear;
- Territorial;
- Courier–postal service;
- Communication security control;
- Communication technical support and automated control systems.

=== Tasks of the Communication Troops by belonging to the control system ===
The main tasks of the Communication Troops of the Armed Forces of the Soviet Union were:

- Operation of existing communication systems;
- Carrying out measures to maintain communication systems in the established degrees of combat readiness;
- Creation, development and improvement of communication systems, ensuring their reliable operation;
- Strengthening and building up communication systems during the transfer of the Armed Forces from peacetime to wartime;
- Deployment of the field component of the communications system during operational deployment of troops.

The communications troops of the central subordination allowed the leadership of the Armed Forces to respond in real time to changes in the military–political and operational–strategic situation in the world, to bring decisions and orders for the combat use of formations and units guaranteed and on time. The communication troops included: separate brigades and communication regiments, field and stationary communications centers, communications security control units, research institutions, educational institutions, repair plants, storage bases, warehouses.

The communication troops of the main headquarters of the branches of the Armed Forces provided command and control of the commanders and the headquarters of the branches of the Armed Forces of groupings of troops (forces) in their daily activities, during the period of military danger and during the performance of combat missions. Their structure is similar to the composition of the communication troops of the central subordination.

The communication troops of the operational–strategic command (strategic commands of directions, fronts, groups, districts, fleets) provided control to the commanders and headquarters of the operational–strategic commands of subordinate formations, formations and units in their daily activities, during a period of military danger and during the performance of combat missions. At this level, the troops included: a nodal communications brigade, a territorial communications brigade, a separate regiment (or battalion) of rear communications, a headquarters communications center, a center for automated control systems, a command post (communications and automated command and control system); courier–postal communication center, communication security control centers (points), communication equipment repair base, storage and repair base for military equipment.

Liaison formations of operational commands (armies and corps) ensured command and control of subordinate formations and units both in daily activities and during a threatened period and during combat missions. They consisted of: a separate communications regiment, a junction, a communications center of the headquarters, a courier–postal communications center, a communications warehouse, a storage and repair base for military equipment.

Communication formations and units of the central, operational–strategic and operational control levels were intended for the deployment and maintenance of stationary and field communication centers of the command posts of the General Staff, the main headquarters of the Armed Forces, operational formations, the deployment of communication lines by various means, the mutual exchange of communication channels with interconnected communication network of the country.

=== Staff structure of troops ===
By the final period of the existence of the Soviet Union, the communication troops of the central subordination (or the Supreme High Command) and the communication troops of the Ground Forces were most massively represented.

Since the end of World War II, the largest formations of the signal troops were brigades, of which there were about 50. The massive creation of brigades began in the second half of the 1970s, when the existing regiments and separate battalions of central and district (group) subordination began to grow larger and reorganized into brigades.

Centrally subordinate brigades differed in their tasks:

- Communication brigades of the Supreme High Command;
- Nodal brigades;
- Linear (territorial);
- Rear communications brigades;
- Reserve communications brigades;
- Communication training teams.

Each of the brigades (except for the nodal ones) was a compound consisting of 3 to 5 separate battalions of various types (radio, tropospheric communications, long–distance communications, radio relay, radio relay cable, underground cable, line, nodal, construction and operational), as well as field and stationary nodes. Field and stationary communications centers were a battalion–level communications formation, consisting of communications units of various types listed above. The nodal brigades consisted of field communication centers.

At the tactical level of command and control of troops (motorized rifle, tank and airborne divisions), as well as combat arms, special forces, technical support and rear, separate battalions and communication companies, communications platoons (command platoons), courier and postal stations, platoons of technical support, workshops for the repair of communications equipment were included in their regular structure.

The main commands of each of the 4 directions (Western, Southwestern, Southern and Far Eastern) had 2 brigades and 2–3 separate communication battalions, and each of the border districts and the Group of Soviet Forces in Germany also had 2–3 communication brigades at their disposal, a regiment and 2–4 separate battalions, including a regiment or rear communications battalion.

For each tank or combined arms army, there was an army communications regiment and a radio relay–cable battalion, and in the army corps there was a separate battalion. The basis of the army regiment was 2 field communications centers and a communications company.

In the communication troops of the ground forces, the main combat unit of the communication troops were battalions of various types, which were both an integral part of brigades and regiments and parts of combined arms formations. These include the following types of battalions:

- As part of an army corps, tank, motorized rifle or airborne divisions – a separate communications battalion;
- As part of the communication brigades:

- Separate communications battalion (junction);
- Separate line (line–cable) communications battalion;
- Separate long–distance communications battalion;
- Separate construction and operational communications battalion;
- Separate battalion of heavy underground cable;

- As part of the combined arms (tank) army, army corps:

- Separate radio relay battalion (or tropospheric communications);
- Separate radio relay and cable battalion.

== Communication Troops armament ==
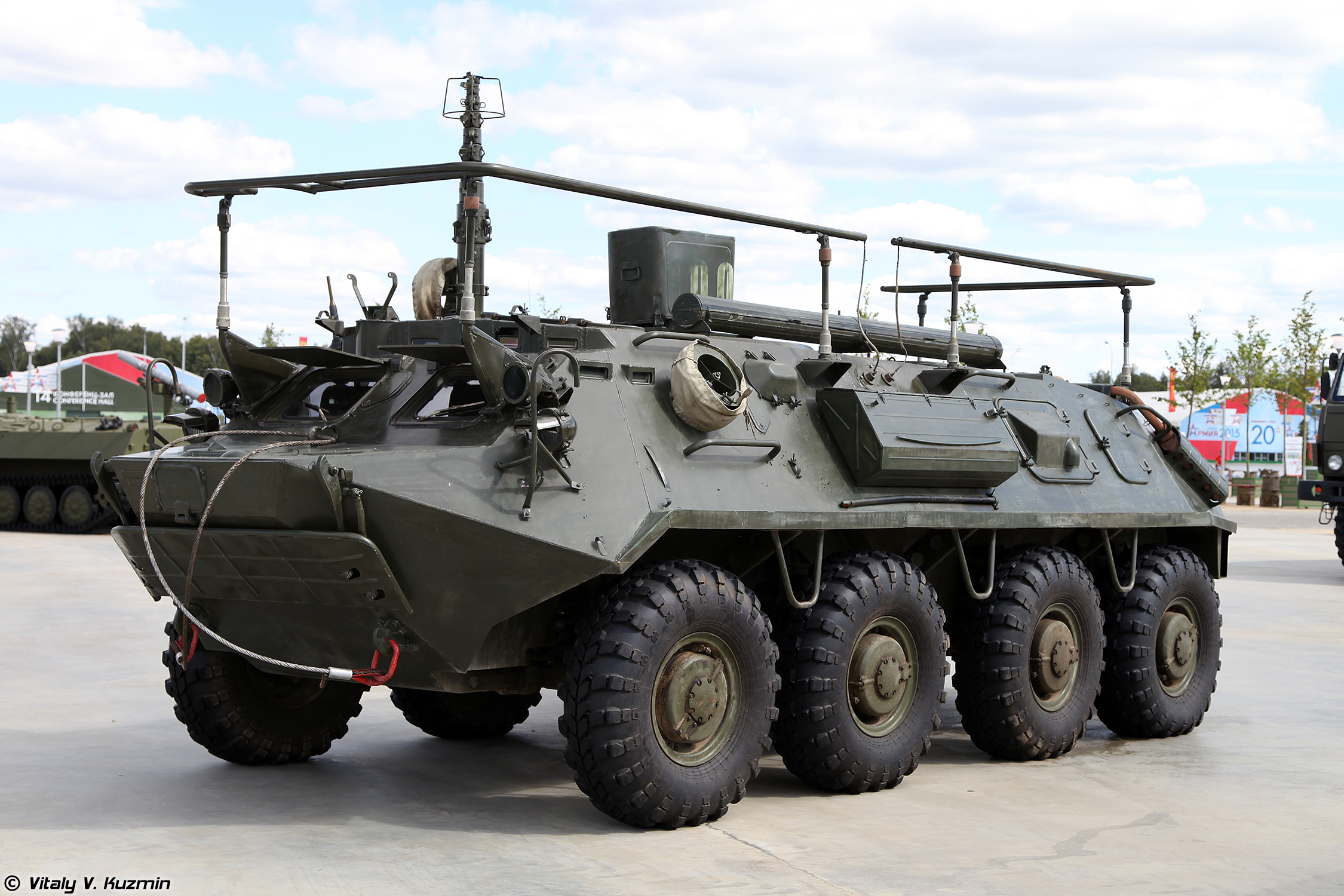
R–145BM – the main command and staff vehicle of the battalion and regimental level of the Ground Forces of the Soviet Union

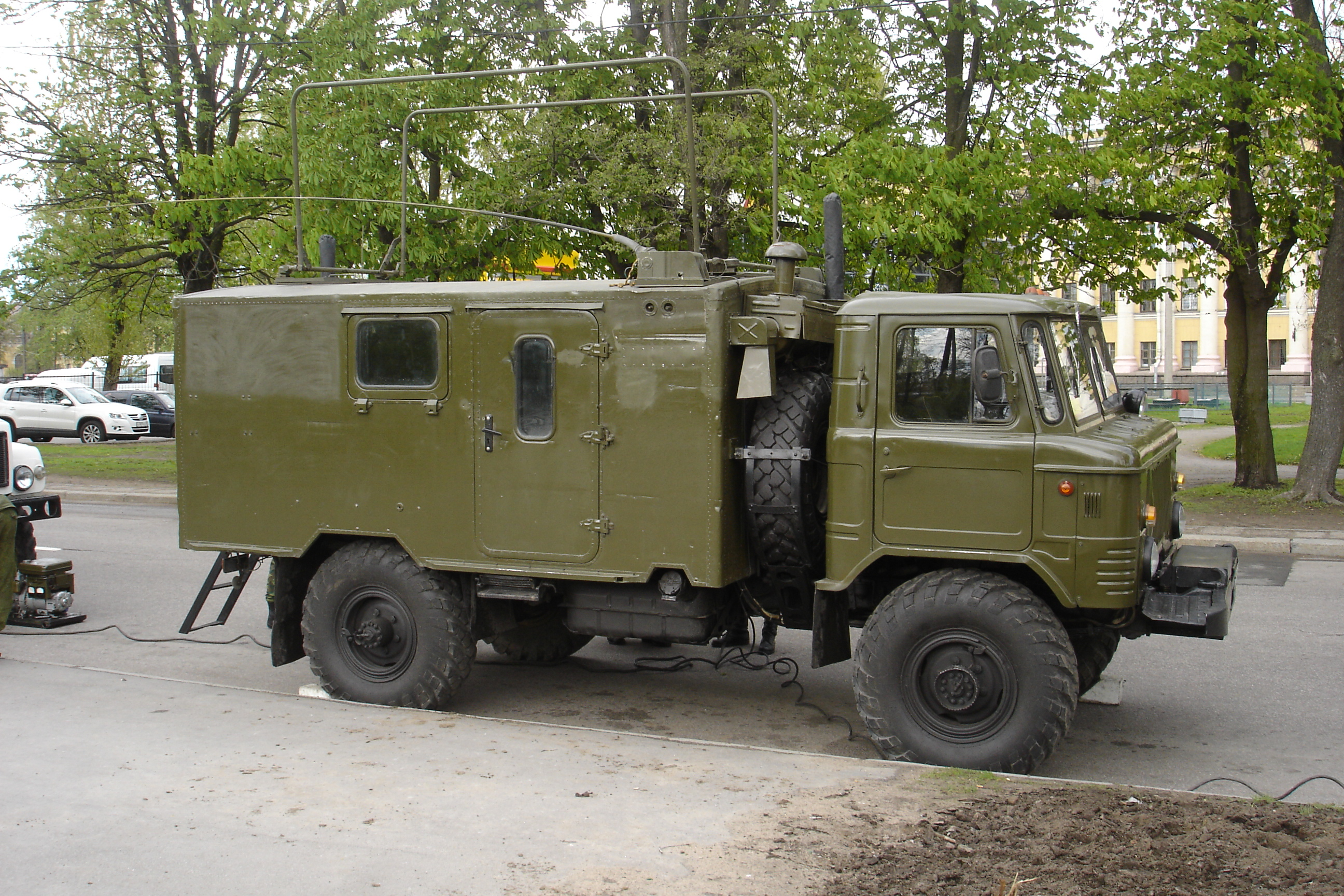
R–142 – the main command and staff vehicle of the battalion and regimental level of the Airborne Forces of the Soviet Union

During the Great Patriotic War, the ground forces were supplied with radio stations 12–RT, RBM, A–7, RSB–F, RAF–KV–3 and others, as well as many samples of telegraph and telephone equipment, including field telegraph devices 2BDA–43 made at that time.

At the end of 1944, the signal troops began to receive the radio station RAF–KV–4 with the "Karbid" equipment, which ensured the operation of direct–printing telegraph devices over radio lines with protection against interference. The industry of the Soviet Union mastered the production of ultra–short–wave radio stations.

In the troops, the saturation with radio communications equipment was constantly increasing at various command and control levels. For example, at the initial stage of the war, the rifle division had only 22 radio stations, but by the end of the war their number had grown to 130.

From the late 1940s and into the 1950s, the communication troops began to receive more advanced means of communication.

The following samples of shortwave car radios were created:

- For radio networks of the General Staff – R–100 and R–110;
- Front–line radio networks – R–101 and R–102;
- Army and corps – P–118 and R–103;
- Divisional – R–104 (portable and transportable modification);
- For tank troops – R–112.

To ensure search–free communication at the tactical level with no tuning required, the troops were supplied with small–sized ultra–shortwave radio stations: R–105, R–1Ob, R–108, R–109, R–114, R–116 and R–113 (tank).

In the same period, a fundamentally new radio relay communication scheme was introduced for the Soviet army (multichannel station R–400 and low–channel station R–401), as well as frequency multiplexing and channelization complexes (P–310, P–304, P–311, P–312, P–313, P–314). Improved samples of telephone and telegraph equipment, switching devices, several types of field communication cables were delivered. The first samples of command–staff vehicles R–125 "Alphabet", radio stations R–118 and radio relay stations R–403 and R–405 appeared in the troops, the installation of which was carried out on GAZ–69 and GAZ–bZ vehicles, and later on UAZ–469 and GAZ–66.

In the postwar years, emphasis was placed on the mobility of field communication centers. In the 1950s and 1960s, the troops were supplied with complexes of mobile communication centers for command posts of different command levels:

- Mobile Communication Center No. 1 – front command post on 22 vehicles;
- Mobile Communication Center No. 2 – front–line on 6 vehicles;
- Mobile Communication Center No. 3 – army on 9 vehicles;
- Mobile Communication Center No. 4 – corps on 4 cars;
- Mobile Communication Center No. 5 – divisional on 1 vehicle.

For operational and operational–tactical units of command and control, new shortwave and ultrashortwave single–band radio stations of high and medium power were delivered: R–135, R–136, R–137, R–140. For the tactical level of control, portable and transportable broadband ultra–shortwave radio stations R–107 and R–111 with automatic tuning to previously prepared frequencies were developed.

Radio relay communications have also made progress. New types of radio stations such as R–121, R–122, R–408 made it possible to provide high–quality multi–channel communication directly between control points at a distance of up to 150–250 kilometers from each other (without retransmission), including through hard–to–reach terrain.

Since the beginning of the 1970s, the signal forces began a radical modernization and rearmament to more advanced models, which is associated with the assumption of the post of chief of the Communication Troops of the Ministry of Defense of the Soviet Union, Colonel–General Andrei Belov.

The troops began to receive command–staff vehicles made on the basis of military equipment (BMP–1KSh and BMD–1KSh), new models of Command and Staff vehicles on an automobile base (R–141, R–142, R–148), a mobile field communications center R–146A, a unified complex for sealing communication lines "Topaz" (P–300, P–301, P–302); classified communication equipment (T–206–ZM).

In 1972, atypical communication equipment was developed and manufactured for the first samples of air command posts of division, army, front, which made it possible to control troops from board aircraft and helicopters.

In the 1970s, the armament of tropospheric communication units was updated, in which the old complexes on several vehicles (R–408 on 3 ZIL–157 vehicles with long trailers) were replaced by mobile and compact stations on one vehicle (R–410 and R–412).

In 1972, the troops began to supply the complex of ground stations for satellite space communications R–440 "Kristall".

Hardware and stations of all types of field communication centers were improved, which received a new automotive base and modified equipment:

- Telephone exchanges P–225;
- Complex hardware rooms P–240 and P–241;
- Equipment for long–distance communication P–234, P–255 and P–257;
- Control rooms of the secret communications equipment P–242 and P–244;
- And other.

A large list of stations and hardware, power plants and antenna devices for various purposes for the communication troops were installed on the chassis of off-road vehicles. These included: GAZ–63, GAZ–69, GAZ–66, ZIL–157, ZIL–131, Ural–375, Ural–4320 and KamAZ–4320. For these chassis, standard box bodies were developed that made it possible to place communication equipment (such as KUNG–1M, KM–66, KM–131).

In order to unify, part of the communications equipment was installed on the basis of armored personnel carriers and infantry fighting vehicles. For example, the following samples of armored vehicles became the basis for the following command and staff vehicles and radio stations:

- BTR–50 → BTR–50PU and BTR–50PUM;
- BMP–1 → BMP–1KSh;
- BMD–1 → BMD–1KSh;
- BRDM → BRDM–5;
- BTR–60 → R–137B, R–140BM, R–145BM, R–156BM, R–238BT, R–240BT, R–241BT, R–409BM, PU–12.

== Chiefs of Communications Troops ==
List of chiefs of Communications Troops:

- Artemy Lyubovich – 1919–1920;
- Corps Commander Innokenty Khalepsky – 1920–1924;
- Army Commander of the 2nd Rank Nikolai Sinyavsky – 1924–1935;
- Corps Commander Roman Longva – 1935–1937;
- Corps Commander Alexey Aksyonov – May 21, 1937 – December 29, 1937;
- Lieutenant General of the Communications Troops Ivan Naydenov – February 1938 – July 26, 1940;
- Major General of the Communications Troops Nikolay Gapich – July 26, 1940 – July 22, 1941;
- Marshal of the Communications Troops Ivan Peresypkin – 1941–1957;
- Colonel General of the Communications Troops Ivan Bulychev – 1957–1958;
- Marshal of the Communications Troops Alexei Leonov – 1958–1970;
- Marshal of the Communications Troops Andrei Belov – 1970–1987;
- Colonel General Konstantin Kobets – 1987–1990;
- Colonel General Oleg Lisovsky – 1990–1991.

== Personnel training ==
=== Officer training ===
The training of junior officers took place in the higher military command and engineering schools of communications. These included:

- Kemerovo Higher Military Command School of Communications Named After Marshal of the Communications Troops Ivan Peresypkin;
- Novocherkassk Higher Military Command Red Banner School of Communications Named After Marshal of the Soviet Union Vasily Sokolovsky;
- Poltava Higher Military Command School of Communications Named After Marshal of the Soviet Union Kirill Moskalenko;
- Ryazan Higher Military Command School of Communications Named After Marshal of the Soviet Union Matvey Zakharov;
- Tomsk Higher Military Command of the Order of the Red Star Communications School;
- Ulyanovsk Higher Military Command of the Order of the Red Star School of Communications Named After Grigory Ordzhonikidze;
- Kiev Higher Military Engineering Twice Red Banner School of Communications Named After Mikhail Kalinin;
- Leningrad Higher Military Engineering School of Communications named after the Leningrad Council.

Advanced training and further training of senior communications officers was carried out in the Military Order of Lenin, the Red Banner Communications Academy Named After Marshal of the Soviet Union Semyon Budyonny in Leningrad.

=== Training of junior specialists ===
In addition to brigades and battalions, the communications troops of the central command were subordinate to training units (both centrally subordinate and district), for example:

- 151st Communications Training Brigade (Military Unit 52922, Samarkand) – deployed on the basis of the 1617th Battalion;
- 208th School of Warrant Officers of the Communications Troops of the Ground Forces (Military Unit 83320, Barybino Settlement);
- 31st Separate Training Communications Regiment of the Group of Soviet Forces in Germany (Military Unit – Field Mail 73046, Werder);
- 52nd Separate Training Communications Regiment of the Turkestan Military District (Military Unit 96699, Ashgabat);
- 58th Separate Training Communications Regiment of the Military Academy of Communications (Military Unit 52052, Sertolovo Settlement);
- 158th Separate Training Communications Regiment of the Far Eastern Military District (Military Unit 52924, Khabarovsk);
- 162nd Separate Training Communications Regiment (Military Unit 22165, Murom) – deployed on the basis of the 1608th Battalion;
- 1609th Separate Training Communications Battalion of the Northern Group of Forces (Military Unit – Field Mail 79066, Legnica);
- 1610th Separate Training Communications Battalion of the Moscow Military District (Military Unit 75269, Murom);
- 1611th Separate Training Communications Battalion of the Leningrad Military District (Military Unit 52919, Chornaya Rechka Settlement);
- 1612th Separate Training Communications Battalion of the Baltic Military District (Military Unit 75270, Vilnius);
- 1613th Separate Training Communications Battalion of the Belarusian Military District (Military Unit 52920, Minsk);
- 1614th Separate Training Communications Battalion of the Carpathian Military District (Military Unit 75271, Zhitomir);
- 1615th Separate Training Communications Battalion of the Odessa Military District (Military Unit 52921, Odessa);
- 1616th Separate Training Communications Battalion of the Transcaucasian Military District (Military Unit 75272, Hoktemberyan);
- 1618th Separate Training Communications Battalion of the Kiev Military District (Military Unit 75273, Gostomel);
- 1619th Separate Training Communications Battalion of the North Caucasus Military District (Military Unit 52923, Rostov–on–Don);
- 1620th Separate Training Communications Battalion of the Trans–Baikal Military District (Military Unit 75274, Ulan–Ude);
- 1686th Separate Training Communications Battalion of the Ural Military District (Military Unit 07170, Sverdlovsk).

Junior specialists for general military formations and units were trained in separate communication training battalions of training motorized rifle and tank divisions, which were available in each district.
