= Arslanov =

Arslanov, feminine: Arslanova is a Russian-language patronymic surname derived from the Turkic given name Arslan. Notable people with the name include:

- Dmitri Arslanov
- Ildar Arslanov
- Khalil Arslanov
