= 5th Group CIS =

Belgian Army communications unit (2003–2011)

5th Group Communication and Information Systems
- 5e Groupe des Systèmes de Communication et d'Information
- Saint-Jean barracks in Tournai, headquarters of the 5 Gp CIS
- Active: 5 May 2003 – 24 March 2011
- Disbanded: 24 March 2011
- Country: Belgium
- Allegiance: Belgian Armed Forces
- Branch: Land Component
- Type: Signals
- Role: Communications and information systems support
- Size: ≈230 personnel
- Part of: Land Component, Belgian Armed Forces
- Headquarters: Tournai
- Nickname: 5 Gp CIS
- Mottos: Partout et toujours ("Everywhere and always")
- Equipment: Mobile and fixed communications systems
- Operations: Afghanistan, Côte d'Ivoire, Cape Verde, Lebanon, Kosovo, Chad

The 5th Group Communication and Information Systems (5e Groupe des Systèmes de Communication et d'Information, 5 Gp CIS) was a military communications unit of the Land Component of the Belgian Armed Forces. Established on 5 May 2003 and based in Tournai, it was the only Land Component formation located in the province of Hainaut.

The unit provided secure communications and information systems support for both national operations and international deployments, participating in more than thirty missions across Africa, Asia and Europe, including participation in the final Belgian detachment to Kosovo in 2010. Known for its motto, Partout et toujours ("Everywhere and always"), the 5 Gp CIS was disbanded in 2011 under the Belgian Army's Transformation Plan.

== Background ==
The origins of Belgium's military communications units date back to the First World War. In 1913, the fortified positions of Liège and Namur each received a telegraph company, marking the beginning of organised army signalling. At mobilisation in August 1914, a telegraph company was created for the fortified position of Antwerp, and eight telegraph sections were established for the Grand Quartier Général, (General Headquarter) the cavalry division and each of the six army divisions. These sections were reorganised as platoons in January 1915 and became full companies by 1917.

A wireless service (service TSF, for télégraphie sans fil) was founded in February 1917, and every major formation received its own radio section. By the end of the war, Belgian communications troops included 1,962 telegraphists, 1,500 radio operators, 600 transmitters, 4,900 telephones, 5,340 kilometres of telephone wire and thousands of signal flags and lamps, illustrating the rapid expansion of military communications during the conflict.

== History ==
=== Formation and role ===
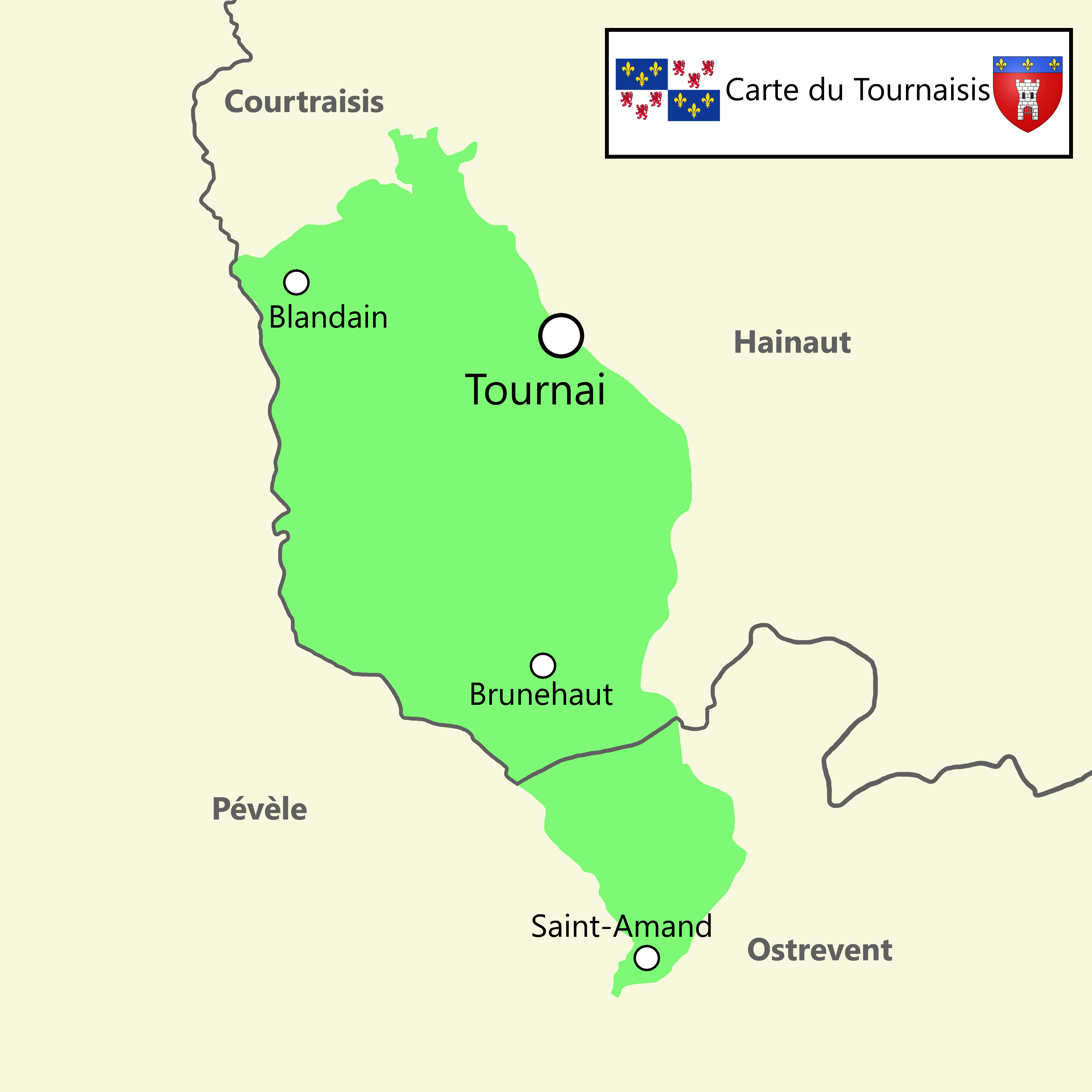
Map of the Tournaisis region in Belgium showing the location of Tournai, where the 5th Group CIS was based

The 5 Gp CIS was created in 2003 as part of the ongoing modernisation of the Land Component, the land-based branch of the Belgian Armed Forces responsible for ground operations, that began in the 1990s. In parliamentary discussions the unit was mentioned as having previously been known under the designation TTR.

The group was established as part of a nationwide reorganisation of Belgian military communications. In a parliamentary reply on 31 January 2003, the Minister of Defence confirmed that the new CIS structure centred on a Centre de compétences "Communication & Information Systems" (CIS) (Competence Centre for Communication and Information Systems) at Peutie, supported by eleven decentralised Centres régionaux de soutien et de services (Regional Support and Service Centers). Five CIS groups, including the 5 Gp CIS at Tournai, were placed under the Land Component as part of this system, with the 5 Gp CIS scheduled to enter service in January 2003.

Its role was to provide secure communication and information systems for both domestic and overseas missions. It was based at the Saint-Jean barracks in Tournai, a site with a long military tradition. The location had previously hosted the 11th Artillery Regiment during the interwar period and later the Belgian Army's logistics schools before the arrival of the 5 Gp CIS in 2003. The 5 Gp CIS specialised in providing communications and information systems support for operational deployments and domestic missions, including the maintenance of communication equipment used by deployed personnel to remain in contact with their families.

From its creation in 2003 until its disbandment, the unit took part in thirty-six overseas missions across Africa, Asia and Europe, with a total of 234 Belgian personnel deployed. The unit comprised around 200 personnel and provided communications support for the Land Component across Belgium and abroad. It was deployed on numerous missions, including in Afghanistan, Côte d'Ivoire, Cape Verde, Lebanon, Chad and Kosovo.

Although the 5 Gp CIS itself was only created in 2003, Belgium had participated in the NATO-led Kosovo Force (KFOR) from its deployment in June 1999 until the end of the Belgian mission in 2010. At its peak, the Belgian contingent numbered around 1,200 personnel. The Belgian government approved the complete withdrawal of its KFOR contingent in late 2009, with the final Belgian detachments scheduled to leave Kosovo by March 2010. In February 2010, personnel from the 5 Gp CIS formed part of the final Belgian detachment deployed to Kosovo.

Its commanding officer, Major Jeff Vandromme, stated that the unit's motto, partout et toujours ("Everywhere and always"), reflected both its operational flexibility and its service to the local population, assisting during crises and supporting regional activities and charitable causes.

=== Restructuring ===
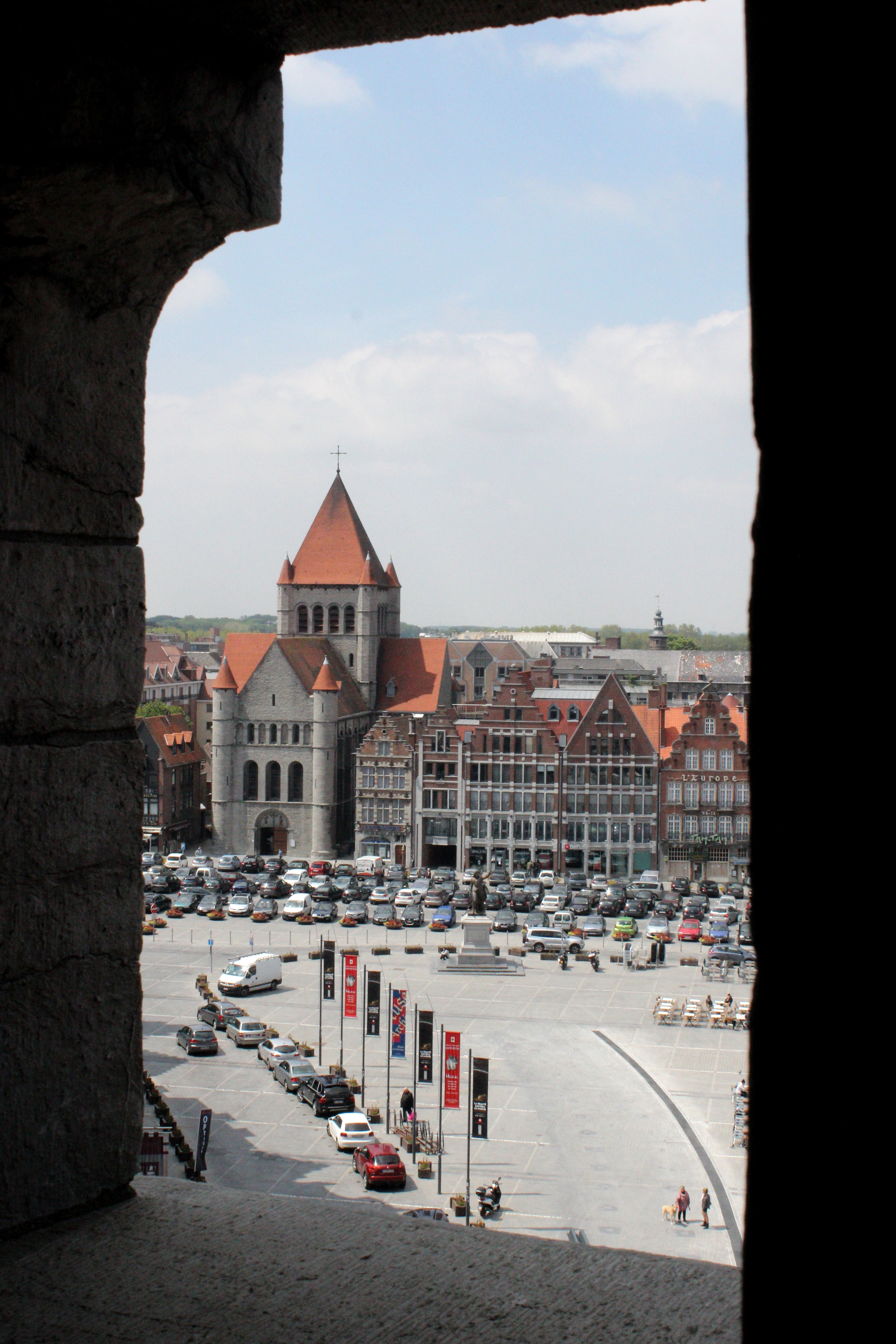
Grand-Place, Tournai where the farewell ceremony to 5th Group CIS took place on 24 March 2011

In 2009, the future of the 5 Gp CIS formed part of a broader parliamentary discussion on the planned restructuring of Belgium's communications units. During a question session in the Chamber of Representatives, Defence Minister Pieter De Crem confirmed that the entire CIS structure was undergoing an in depth reorganisation at the Evere general staff as part of the transition towards a 37,725 person force by 2011. The minister noted the long-standing military presence in Tournai and the specific position of the province of Hainaut, which he insisted would be considered in future relocation or dissolution plans.

In December 2010, the Ministry of Defence presented and confirmed a major restructuring under the finalisation de la transformation plan presented by Defence Minister Peter de Crem. The reform reorganised the army into two principal brigades and reduced personnel numbers. Among the affected formations in Hainaut were the 5 Gp CIS in Tournai and the 2nd Medical Intervention Element (EMI 2) in Ghlin, together involving around 300 of the province's 1,150 active military personnel. The dissolution of the 5 Gp CIS was scheduled for 15 January 2011 as part of this broader consolidation of logistics and communications units.

=== Disbandment ===
As part of the Belgian Army Transformation Plan and the creation of the Medium Brigade, the 5 Gp CIS was formally disbanded in 2011. A farewell ceremony took place on 24 March 2011 in the Grand-Place of Tournai, attended by around 150 Belgian and French soldiers, including personnel from the 41st Signals Regiment of Douai. The event was presided over by Lieutenant-General Marc Compernol, Aide-de-camp to the King and Commander of the Land Component.

== Sources ==
- "Belgian mission in Kosovo winds down". VRT NWS. 28 January 2010.
- "Les communications durant la Première Guerre mondiale". 2014–18 (in French). 6 April 2018.
- "COMKFOR met with the Head of the Belgian Diplomatic Office in Pristina". NATO. 2021.
- "Compte rendu intégral – Chambre des représentants" (in French). Chambre des représentants de Belgique. 19 November 2009.
- Diricq, Stéphane (30 July 2009). "Détail d'article". lavenir.net (in French).
- "Le 5 Gp CIS fait ses adieux à Tournai". lavenir.net (in French). 14 March 2011.
- "Le 5 Gp CIS quitte définitivement la caserne Saint-Jean". lavenir.net (in French). 17 December 2010.
- Lesent, Michaël (8 February 2010). "Détail d'article". lavenir.net (in French).
- "finalisation de la transformation". La Libre.be (in French). 18 December 2010.
- "Patrimoine militaire suite". Les Amis de la Citadelle de Tournai (in French). 18 September 2021.
- "Question n° 342 de M. Martial Lahaye et réponse du ministre de la Défense" (PDF) (in French). Chambre des représentants de Belgique. 31 January 2003.
- "Question n°11959 de Mme Marie-Christine Marghem et réponse du ministre de la Défense" (PDF) (in French). Chambre des représentants de Belgique. 29 April 2009.
- Saintghislain, Par Valéry (14 October 2009). "Mouvements de troupe en vue". Le Soir (in French).
