= Khalil Arslanov =

Russian general

- Халил Абдухалимович Арсланов
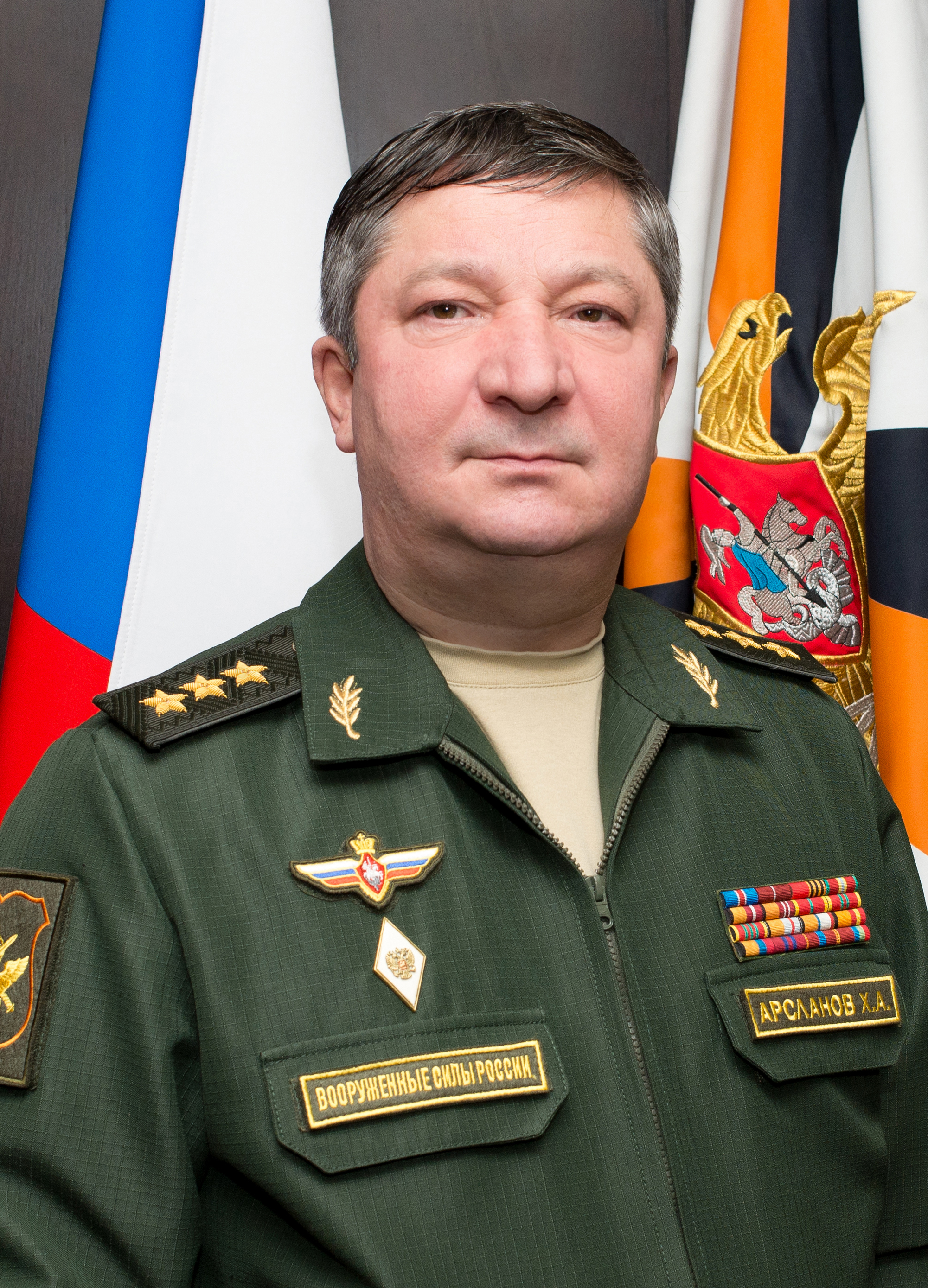
- Official portrait, 2014
- Born: April 4, 1964 (age 62); Ulyanovsk Oblast, RSFSR
- Education: Signal Corps Academy; Military Academy of the General Staff
- Military career
- Allegiance: Russia
- Branch: Russian Ground Forces
- Service years: 1987–2020
- Rank: Colonel general
- Commands: Russian Signal Troops
- Conflicts: Syrian civil war; Russian intervention
- Awards: Order of Zhukov; Order of Military Merit; Medal of the Order "For Merit to the Fatherland"; Medal of Zhukov; Jubilee Medal "70 Years of the Armed Forces of the USSR"; Medal "For Military Valour"; Medal "For Distinguished Military Service"; Medal "For Impeccable Service"; Medal "For Ministry of Defense's 200th Anniversary

Khalil Abdukhalimovich Arslanov (Russian: Халил Абдухалимович Арсланов; born April 4, 1964, Elkhovoe Ozero, Ulyanovsk Oblast RSFSR) is a Russian military officer. He served as head of the Russian Signal Troops of the Russian Armed Forces and Deputy Chief of the General Staff from December 2013 to April 2020. He has held the rank of Colonel General since 2017.

== Biography ==
Elkhovoe Ozero, Tsilninsky District, Ulyanovsk Oblast, RSFSR, Soviet Union. He served in the Soviet Army since 1981. He served in the Signal Corps. In 1985 he graduated from the Ulyanovsk Higher Military Command School of Communications. He graduated from the Budyonny Military Academy of the Signal Corps in 1995, and the Military Academy of the General Staff of the Russian Armed Forces in 2004.

He served as chief of communications of an artillery battalion of a tank division, commander of a control battery and artillery reconnaissance of a tank division, chief of communications of the 5th tank division (now 37th Motorized Rifle Brigade Kyakhta), chief of staff of a territorial communications brigade, commander of a territorial communications brigade, chief of communications and deputy chief of staff of the army, Chief of Communications and Deputy Chief of Staff for Communications of the Volga–Ural Military District, Head of the 1st Directorate of the Directorate of the Chief of Communications Troops of the Armed Forces.

- Since 2009 − Chief of Communications − Deputy Chief of the Main Staff of the Ground Forces for Communications.
- Since December 2013 − Head of the Main Communications Directorate of the Armed Forces − Deputy Chief of the General Staff of the Armed Forces of the Russian Federation.
- Lieutenant General (12/13/2014).
- Colonel General (12/12/2017).

=== Fraud charge ===
In October 2019, Arslanov was charged with major fraud. A criminal case has been initiated under Part 4 of Art. 159 of the Criminal Code of Russia. In December 2019, the court seized Arslanov's property and extended the investigation until February 6, 2020. On January 21, 2020, he was charged with two counts of particularly large fraud in the total amount of about 6.7 billion rubles.

According to investigators, Arslanov stole funds during the execution of a government contract for the maintenance and repair of special military equipment. Along with Arslanov, who does not admit guilt, two heads of General Staff departments, three top managers of Voentelecom company and the general director of the consulting company ErSiAi (Russian: ЭрСиАй) appear in the criminal case.

On February 7, 2020, he was detained by FSB officers during an investigation on this charge. The court pre-detentioned Arslanov for a period of 2 months, and later the term of imprisonment was extended. On April 3, 2020, he was removed from office. According to the Kommersant newspaper dated June 17, 2022, the trial against Arslanov will be held behind closed doors due to the fact that the case materials contain information constituting an official secret. In the fraud case he was sentenced to 17 years in prison in 2025.
