= Telegraph troops =

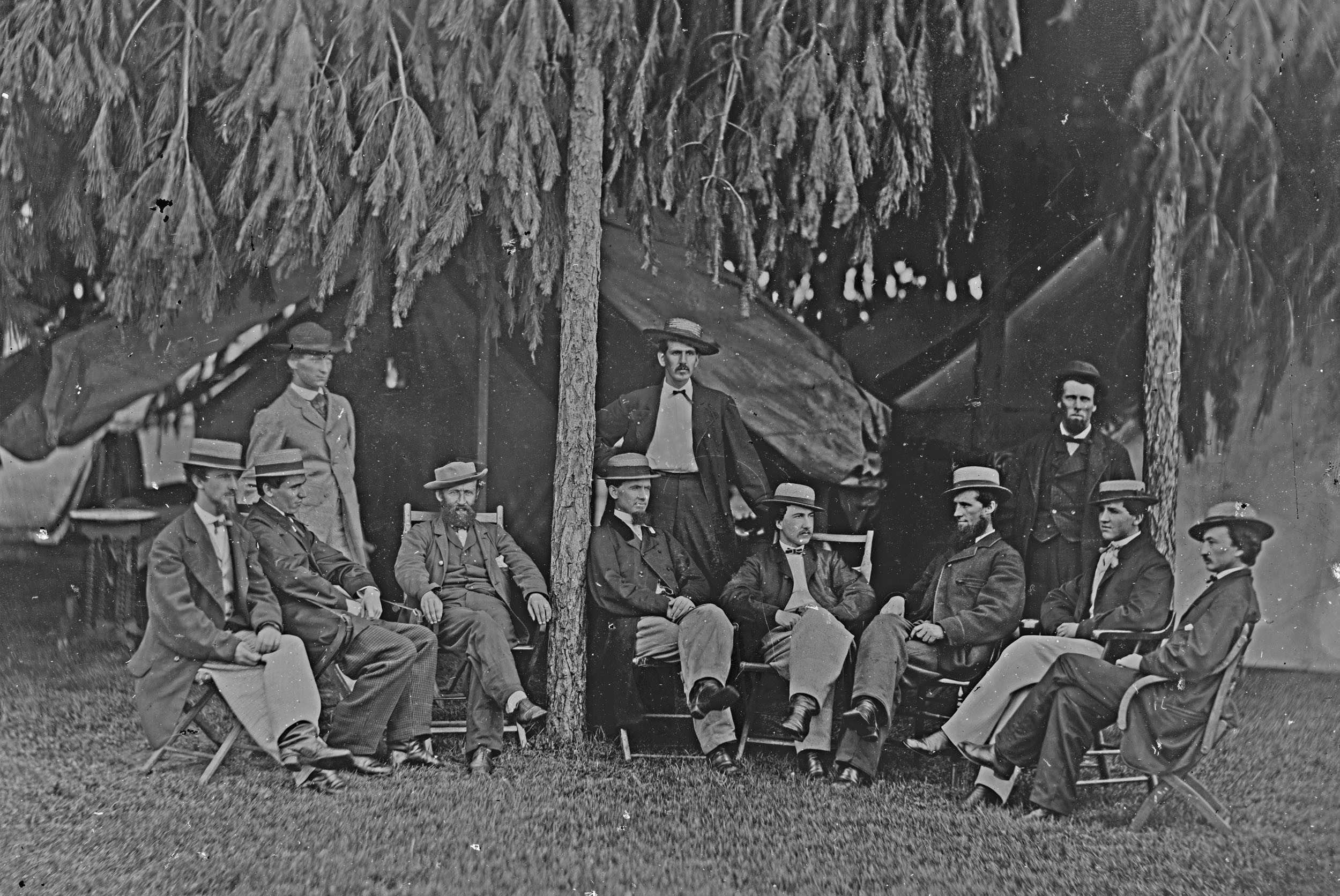
Telegraphists in the American Civil War, 1865

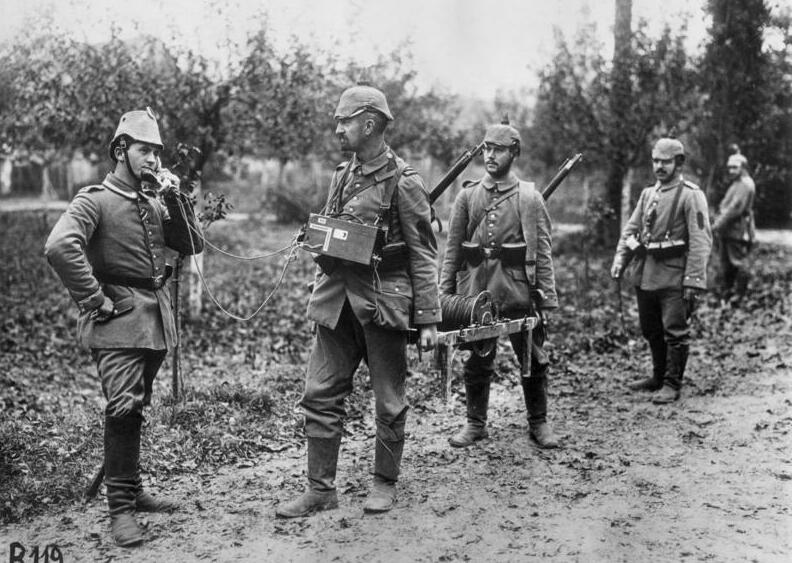
German soldiers laying cable in World War I, 1914

Telegraph troops are responsible for the establishment of their own side’s telegraphic communications in war and for the disruption of the enemy’s telegraphic communications. The telegraph troops created in Prussia in 1830 within the New Prussian engineer battalions were established as a separate corps in 1899, which subsequently became the Signal Corps of the Wehrmacht and Waffen SS. Its modern successors are the signal troops and electronic warfare troops. Its predecessors used various optical telegraphic systems.

== Historical development in European armies ==
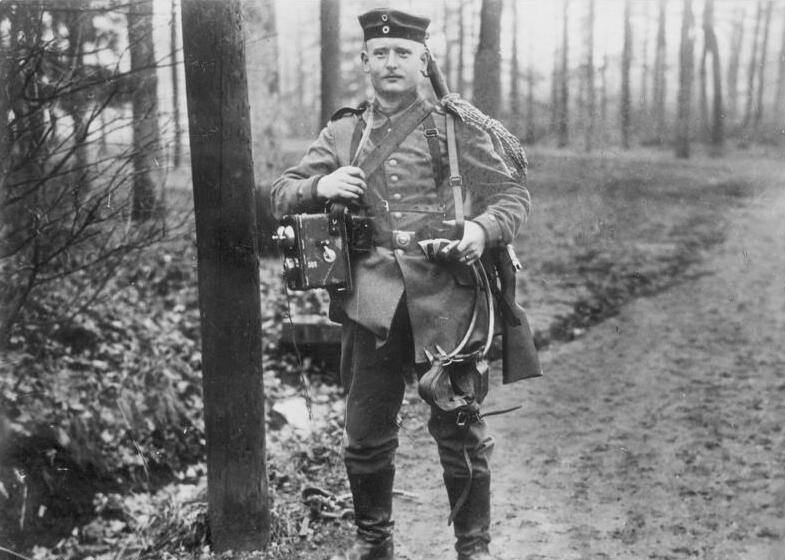
German signaller in 1914

- Portugal created a Military Telegraph Corps in 1810, having a field telegraph company since 1884;
- The German Empire and France had no telegraph troops in peacetime until the late 19th century.
- The British Army had, in peacetime, one telegraph battalion of two divisions, of which one was permanently equipped and ready for war, whilst the other was allocated to the national civil telegraph administration. This formed part of the Royal Engineers until 1920, when it was established as a separate branch - the Royal Corps of Signals.
- Italy had three telegraph units, comprising two companies each, and which belonged to the 3rd Engineer Regiment;
- The Common Army of the Austro-Hungarian Empire had a railway and telegraph regiment with two battalions of four companies each;
- Russia had 17 wartime (field) telegraph parks, which were part of their sapper brigades. The parks were operated in co-ordination with Field Army Corps-level units of the Imperial Army's Signal Corps. These Signal Corps units in each Army Corps consisted of two signals divisions (8 infantry regiments in 4 brigades), one signals battalion (between one and three sapper telegraph companies) and one of the aforementioned field engineering department parks stocked with 20 telegraphs, 193 telegraphs and 333 cable lines. The Signal Corps had been established as a separate Army branch in 1912.
- Belgium, the Netherlands, Romania, Sweden and Spain each had a telegraph company in peacetime.

== German Empire ==
=== Prussian telegraph battalions ===
==== Telegraph Battalion No. 1 ====
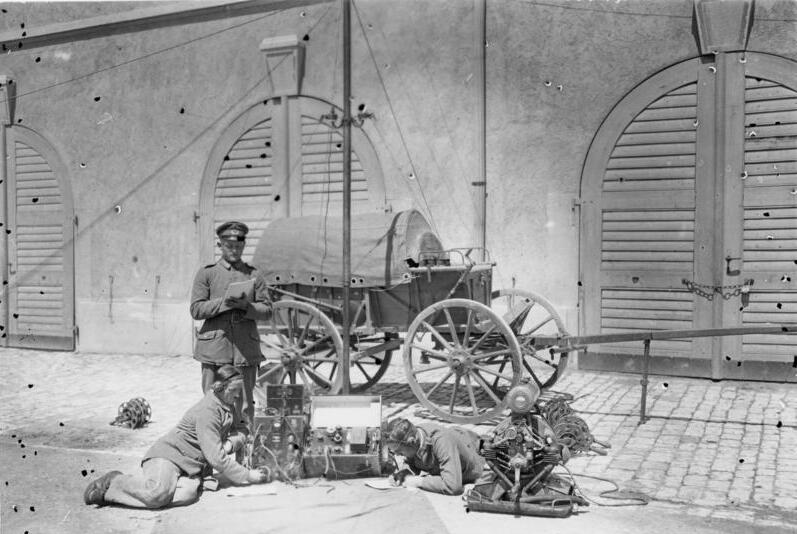
Signallers with an army field wagon, 1914

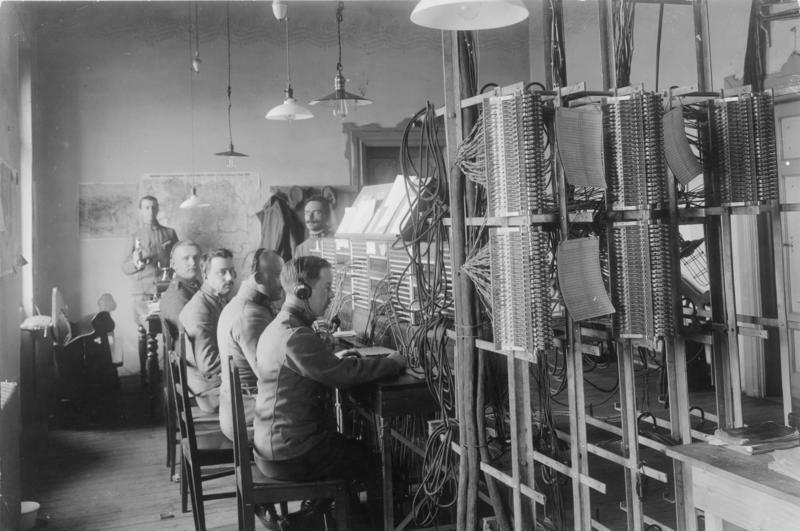
Telegraph exchange in the army of the German Empire

Telegraph Battalion No. 1 was subordinated to the Guards Corps. Its peacetime location was Berlin (Treptower Park). A Royal Saxon detachment formed the 3rd (Royal Saxon) company and elements of the 4th company; and a Württemberg detachment formed elements of the 2nd and 4th companies. Its day of formation was 25 March 1899.

The battalion was subordinated to the Cavalry Telegraph School.

==== Telegraph Battalion No. 2 ====
Telegraph Battalion No. 2 was subordinated to the III Corps and 1st Inspectorate of the Telegraph Corps. Peacetime locations were Frankfurt an der Oder and Cottbus. Day of formation was 25 March 1899.

==== Telegraph Battalion No. 3 ====
Telegraph Battalion No. 3 was subordinated to the VIII Corps and the 2nd Telegraph Corps Inspectorate. Its year of formation was 1899 and its peacetime locations were in Coblenz the former Boelcke Barracks and, from 1914, Darmstadt as well.

==== Telegraph Battalion No. 4 ====
The battalion was established on 1 October 1907 and was subordinated to the XIV Corps and 2nd Inspectorate of the Telegraph Corps. Peacetime locations were Karlsruhe and Freiburg.

==== Telegraph Battalion No. 5 ====
The battalion was established on 1 October 1912 and was subordinated to the VII Corps and the 1st Inspectorate of the Telegraph Corps. Peacetime location was Danzig.

==== Telegraph Battalion No. 6 ====
Telegraph Battalion No. 6 was established in 1913 and was garrisoned at Hanover.

=== Saxon telegraph battalions ===
==== Telegraph Battalion No. 7 ====
Telegraph Battalion No. 7 was subordinated to the 1st Telegraph Corps Inspectorate. Its peacetime location was Zeithain.

=== Bavarian telegraph battalions ===
==== 1st Telegraph Battalion ====
The 1st Telegraph Battalion was established in 1901 and garrisoned in Munich.

==== 2nd Telegraph Battalion ====
The 2nd Telegraph Battalion was established in 1912 and garrisoned in Munich.

=== Deployment in the First World War ===
At the beginning of the First World War additional signal elements were established from the 9 telegraph battalions and 8 fortress signal companies that belonged to the transport troops. Due to the tactical changeover to trench warfare, from 1915 all telegraph units were renamed as army signal units (‚‘Armee-Fernsprechabteilungen‘‘) and were divided into elements that operated the existing communications network and elements responsible for the maintenance of communications and construction of new communication links.

In trench warfare, cable communications were often cut by the continual barrage of enemy fire. As a result, carrier pigeons and signal dogs were often used. In addition, special optical signal sections were established.
