= 2nd Group CIS =

Military unit of the Belgian Armed Forces

2nd Group Communication and Information Systems
- Active: 2 April 2003 - 2011
- Country: Belgium
- Branch: Land Component
- Type: Signals
- Garrison/HQ: Sint-Niklaas

The 2nd Group Communication and Information Systems was a military communications unit in the Land Component of the Belgian Armed Forces. The 2nd Gp CIS was stationed at the Westakkers base in Sint-Niklaas. They operated and maintained secure communications and information systems at strategic, operational and tactical level. In 2006, the 2nd Gp CIS deployed to Lebanon to support the Belgian contingent during demining operations under United Nations structure.

With the Transformation Plan of the Belgian Army and establishment of the Medium Brigade, the 2nd Group CIS was disbanded in 2011 and its personnel was mainly transferred to the 6th Group CIS.

== Sources ==
- Belgische Kamer van Volksvertegenwoordigers QRVA 19698-19699 Questions Belgian Chamber of Representatives - Management Network and data communication systems by the 2nd Gp CIS, page 60-61, retrieved October 24, 2023.
- Beveren en Sint-Niklaas versterken band in Westakkers Cooperation between 2nd Gp CIS and city of Sint-Niklaas, including past operations abroad of the 2nd Gp CIS, retrieved 24 October 2023
- Wase Troepen worden ingezet in Libanon 2nd Groups CIS deployment in Libanon, within Belgian contingent under United Nations structure, retrieved 24 October 2023
- Provincie Oost-Vlaanderen - Motie militaire kwartieren Westakkers Motion preservation Westakkers military quarters of the 2nd Group CIS in Sint-Niklaas, retrieved October 24, 2023.
