= Russian Signal Troops =

Combat Arm of the Russian Ground Forces for military communications

- Войска связи России

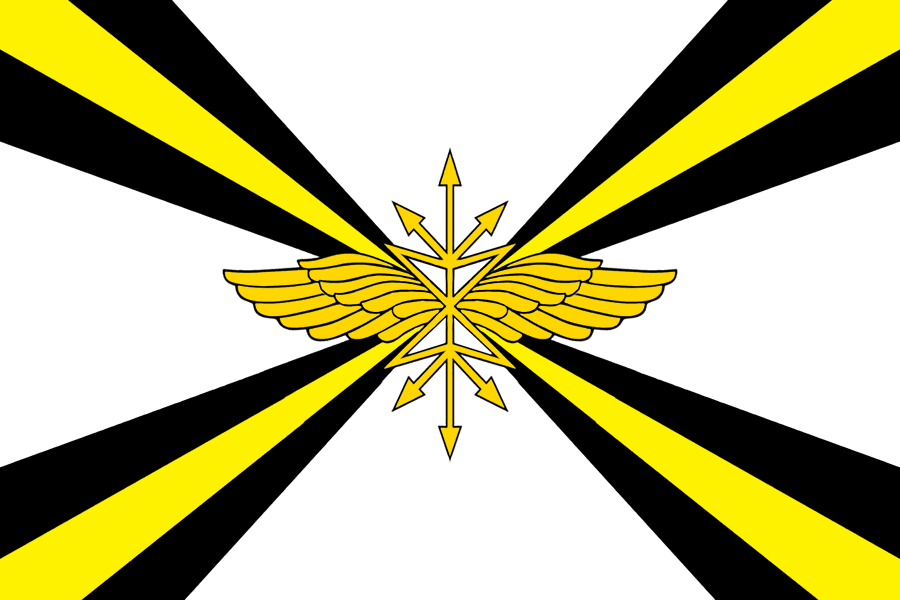

Agency overview
- Formed: 1877
- Jurisdiction: Russian Federation
- Agency executive: H. A. Arslanov, Commander
- Parent agency: Russian Ground Forces; Special Forces

Collar insignia of the Signal Troops

The Russian Signal Troops (Russian: Войска связи), also known as the Signal Communications Troops, is a Combat Arm of the Russian Ground Forces, responsible for military communications.

The Signal Troops are an integral part of the Armed Forces. Its condition and functioning largely influences efficiency of command, the timeliness of combat equipment and weapons. In its development, the Signal Troops has come a long and difficult process that is inextricably linked with the history of the Armed Forces, the changes in the forms and methods of their use and the improvement of military art. From simple audio and visual means of communication for the transmission of signals and commands on the battlefield to widely branched multi-channel, advanced automated systems that can provide a link of virtually unlimited range of both stationary and moving objects on the ground, in the water, under the water and in the air, this is the historical path of development and improvement of military communications. Communication on the battlefield is one of the main types of operational support.

== Overview ==
According to the Russian Ministry of Defence, the Signal Communications Troops are special troops designed for deployment of communications systems and support of control over associations, formations and subdivisions of the Land Force in peacetime and wartime. They are also assigned for the tasks of operating systems and automation equipment at command posts.

Signal Communications Troops include the main and line formations and units, units of technical support of signal communications and automated control systems, signal communications security services, postal-and-courier communications services, and others.

Modern Signal Communications Troops are equipped with mobile, highly reliable radio relay, tropospheric, space stations, high-frequency telephony equipment, tone telegraphy, television and photographic equipment, switching equipment and special equipment of classifying messages.

The main developing direction of the Signal Communications Troops is equipping the Land Force with means and complexes of signal communications, as well as automated systems for control of troops and weapons, providing steady, continuous, rapid and secretive control over associations, formations and subdivisions in peacetime, period of threat and during conducting hostilities under the toughest physical-geographic and climatic conditions. Particular attention is given to introduction of an integrated system of control over troops and weapons of the tactical level and equipping troops with digital signal communications means providing secure, jam-resistant mode of exchange of information from the individual serviceman to the formation’s commander.

== History ==
Due to the spatial scale of hostilities, the communication problem in the military in the 19th century acquired great importance. In the Imperial Russian Army the first attempts to introduce the telegraph took place during the Russian-Turkish war of 1877-1878, and it brought along with it enormous benefit in the management of troops, they have led to greater use of means of communication. Telegraphs and telephones occupied a prominent place in the management of troops, with the most widely developed mobile lines for leading troops directly in the war theater. At the end of the 19th century the military telegraph and telephone park consisting of units directly administered by the Chief Engineer's Office, operated lines in Central Russia - 17 lines (975 miles) and the Caucasus - two (130 miles). In addition, the fortresses were given 55 communication nodes (423 miles).

In February 1905, in the Red Village, where there was a military warehouse of radios purchased abroad, was sent a group of officers, graduates of military signalers electrical schools to train stations to study the experience of command and control in combat conditions. Already in March 1905, these officers were sent to fight in the Russo-Japanese War that spring, and were integrated into the regular forces of the Army.

In 1912, the Signals Corps was raised as a separate arm, with Corps units in the Army. These Corps consists of two signals divisions (8 infantry regiments in 4 brigades), one signals battalion (one and three sapper telegraph company) and one field engineering department park was stocked with 20 telegraphs, 193 telegraphs and 333 cable lines. The Corps fought bravely in the actions of the First World War.

After the October Revolution and as the Russian Civil War had dawned in 1918, the Red Army officially reorganized the Russian Signals Corps, and October 20, 1919 they were officially recognized as special troops, as signals units distinguished themselves in action during the Civil War days.

General-mayor of Signals N.I. Gapich headed the Directorate of Communications of the Red Army on the outbreak of war. After the German Operation Barbarossa began, signals communications needs multiplied. The signal forces were "poorly equipped, severely undermanned, and incapable of performing their primary wartime missions," and thus they were the "weakest portion of the army's entire force structure" on the eve of Operation Barbarossa. Before the war, the army's signals forces were made up primarily of signals regiments and battalions assigned to it, maintained at 40-45% strength, and units responsible for communicating between the General Staff and field forces, which the People's Commissariat for Defence planned to mobilize only on the event of war.

On 23 July 1941, to help address these problems, Colonel Ivan Peresypkin was appointed as Chief of Signals Forces on the order of the People's Commissariat for Defence. The Communications Directorate was elevated to a Main Directorate. The Chief of Signals Forces would later acquire the rank of Marshal of a branch in 1944, and three more generals would be promoted to Marshal of Signals Troops after the war.

=== Postwar period ===
In connection with the post-war mass demobilization in the armed forces and the reduction of armed forces in the period from 1945 to 1946, more than 300 signal units were disbanded (not counting those that were part of the corps and divisions). In March 1946, the Main Directorate of Communications of the Red Army was transformed into the Directorate of the Chief of Communications Troops of the Ground Forces of the Armed Forces of the USSR.

Also in 1946, the Osnaz formations that carried out radio reconnaissance were returned from the structure of the NKVD-NKGB to the subordination of the War Ministry.

In April 1948, by directive of the USSR Minister of Defence, the Directorate of the Chief of Signal Troops of the Ground Forces was transformed into the Directorate of Signal Troops of the Soviet Army.

In October 1958, the Directorate of Signal Troops of the Soviet Army was transformed into the Directorate of the Chief of Signal Troops of the USSR Ministry of Defence (see Communication Troops of the Ministry of Defense of the Soviet Union).

The main part of the formations and units of the Signal Forces supported the activities of the ground forces.

Generalization and analysis of the experience of combat use of signal troops convincingly showed that success in conducting operations and battles depends to a large extent on the quality of command and control of troops, and command and control of troops depends on the state of technical equipment, capabilities and level of preparedness of signal troops.

In the first post-war years, in the signal troops of the Soviet Army, much attention was paid to the development and implementation of new principles for organizing communications of operational units and combined arms formations based on the rich experience of the Second World War, as well as the development and substantiation of operational and tactical requirements for new means and communications systems capable of ensuring command and control of troops in new conditions of combat operations.

At the end of 1944, Marshal I.T. Peresypkin set the task of starting work on the preparation of the first post-war weapons system for military communications.

In the late 1940s and 50s, troops began to receive new communications systems with qualitatively new tactical and technical characteristics.

Shortwave car radios were created for radio networks General Staff, for front-line radio networks, for army (corps) radio networks, as well as for divisional networks and a tank radio station.

Portable ultrashortwave radio stations were created, which provided non-search and non-tuning communications at the tactical control level.

At the same time, technical means were created for a fundamentally new type of communication for the Soviet Army - radio relay communication (multi-channel station R-400 and small-channel R-401), as well as frequency multiplexing and channelization complexes, qualitatively new models telephone and telegraph equipment, switching devices, several types of field communication cables.

Equipping troops with radio relay stations was a qualitatively new stage in the development of communication systems of operational formations and combined arms formations, increased their reliability, survivability and noise immunity, and also improved a number of other indicators. The introduction of new equipment into the troops required a revision of the organizational and technical structure of communication centers. Based on the use of new means of communication, standard complexes of automobile hardware rooms were created to form mobile field communication centers of various control points. For the first time, industrially produced mobile communications units (MCCs) began to enter service with the troops. The time to deploy such communication nodes was sharply reduced, and the mobility of communication systems in general increased significantly.

In the second half of the 50s, the rapid development of nuclear missile weapons, qualitative improvement of other means of armed warfare began, which led to significant changes in the structure of the Armed Forces of the USSR. These circumstances, in turn, necessitated the development of new methods of command and control of troops and weapons.

The period of the 60s, in general, is characterized by the beginning of practical work on the creation of automated control systems for troops and weapons (anti-aircraft, artillery and missile troops) and design work in the field of automation of control of armed forces.

Increased requirements for communication systems and channels began to appear in terms of their stability, noise immunity, secrecy and timeliness in the transmission of information.

The signal troops successfully solved these complex new tasks.

With the resignation of Marshal of the Signal Troops I. T. Peresypkin in 1957, A. I. Leonov (since 1961, Marshal of Signal Troops) became head of the Signals Troops.

== Units (2017) ==
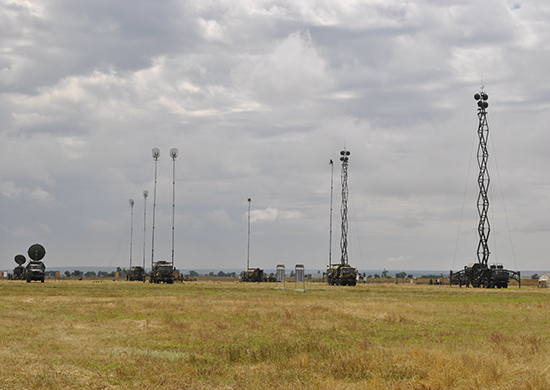
Russian military signalmen at the exercises

- 1st Control Brigade (Sertolovo) (Western Military District) (ru:1-я бригада управления)
- 9th Guards Control Brigade (Voronezh) (20th Guards Combined Arms Army) The 9th Guards Lviv-Berlin Orders of Bogdan Khmelnytsky, Alexander Nevsky and Red Star brigade of [management/control] is a unit of the Ground Forces of the Russian Federation. Its Military Unit Number is 31895.
- 34th Control Brigade (Vladikavkaz) (58th Combined Arms Army)
- 35th Control Brigade (Kochenyovo) (41st Combined Arms Army)
- 38th Guards Communications Brigade (Moscow Oblast) (Russian Airborne Forces)
- 54th Headquarters Brigade (Belogorsk) (35th Combined Arms Army)
- 59th Guards Headquarters Brigade (Verkhnyaya Pyshma, Yekaterinburg) (Central Military District) (v/ch 28331) (ru:59-я_гвардейская_бригада_управления) Upgraded to "Guards" status 13 July 2023. On 13 April 2024, Ukrainian officials claimed to have destroyed a major Russian headquarters in Luhansk using Storm Shadow missiles. Russian media later reported that Colonel Pavel Kropotov, commander of the 59th Guards Communications Brigade, was killed in the attack.
- 60th Headquarters Brigade (Selyatino and Odintsovo) (1st Guards Tank Army)
- 66th Headquarters Brigade (Afipsky) (49th Combined Arms Army)
- 75th Headquarters Brigade (Ulan-Ude) (36th Combined Arms Army)
- 80th Headquarters Brigade (Ussuriysk) (5th Combined Arms Army)
- 91st Headquarters Brigade (Samara) (2nd Guards Tank Army)
- 95th Headquarters Brigade (Saint Petersburg) (6th Combined Arms Army)
- 101st Headquarters Brigade (Chita, Zabaykalsky Krai) (29th Combined Arms Army)
- 104th Headquarters Brigade (Khabarovsk) (Eastern Military District)
- 132nd Signal Brigade (Agalatovo) (6th Combined Arms Army)
- 175th Headquarters Brigade (Aksay) (Southern Military District)
- 176th Headquarters Brigade (Novocherkassk)
- 179th Headquarters Brigade (Yekaterinburg, Verkhnyaya Pyshma) (Central Military District)

== See also ==
- Budyonny Military Academy of the Signal Corps
- Communication Troops of the Ministry of Defense of the Soviet Union
- Telegraph troops
