= Signal corps =

Military branch responsible for military communications (signals)

A signal corps is a military branch, responsible for military communications (signals). Many countries maintain a signal corps, which is typically subordinate to a country's army.

Military communication usually consists of radio, telephone, and digital communications.

The first dedicated signal corps of any nation was the United States Army Signal Corps, established in 1860.

== Asia ==
- Rejimen Semboyan Diraja, Malaysian Royal Signals Regiment
- Indian Army Corps of Signals, raised in 1911.
- Pakistan Army Corps of Signals, raised in 1947.
- Singapore Armed Forces Signals Formation
- Sri Lanka Signals Corps
- Israeli C4I Corps
- Korps Perhubungan TNI AD (Indonesian Army Signal Corps)
- Armed Forces of the Philippines Signal Corps
- Signal Department, Royal Thai Army

== Australia ==
- Royal Australian Corps of Signals
- Royal New Zealand Corps of Signals

== Europe ==
- Arma delle Trasmissioni, corps of Italian Army founded in 1953, see List of units of the Italian Army.
- Royal Corps of Signals, founded in the United Kingdom (under the name Telegraph Battalion Royal Engineers) in 1884.
- Communications and Information Services Corps (CIS), the signals corps of Ireland's Defence Forces.
- Communication and Information Systems Groups (CIS) of the Belgian Armed Forces, before: Transmission Troops
- Signal Brigade, a unit of the Serbian Armed Forces
- Telegrafregimentet, Royal Danish Signal Regiment
- Sambandsbataljonen in the Brigade Nord of the Norwegian Army
- Regiment Verbindingstroepen, a regiment of the Royal Netherlands Army.
- Fernmeldetruppe of Bundeswehr, formerly Signal Corps of the Wehrmacht and Waffen SS
- Signal Communications Troops of Russia.
- Signal Corps (French Army)
- Viestirykmentti, Signal Regiment of the Finnish Army.
- Swedish Army Signal Troops

== North America ==
- Royal Canadian Corps of Signals, formed in 1903 as the Canadian Signalling Corps
- United States Army Signal Corps, founded in 1860 by Major Albert J. Myer

== See also ==
- Military communications
- Telegraph troops
