= Soviet space exploration history on Soviet stamps =

Space exploration on Soviet stamps

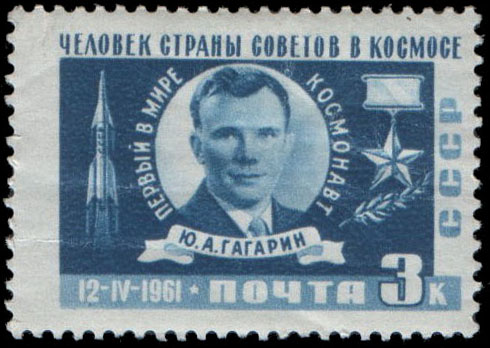
Yuri Gagarin on 12 April 1961, became the first human in outer space and the first to orbit the Earth. A Soviet stamp issued after the Gagarin's flight

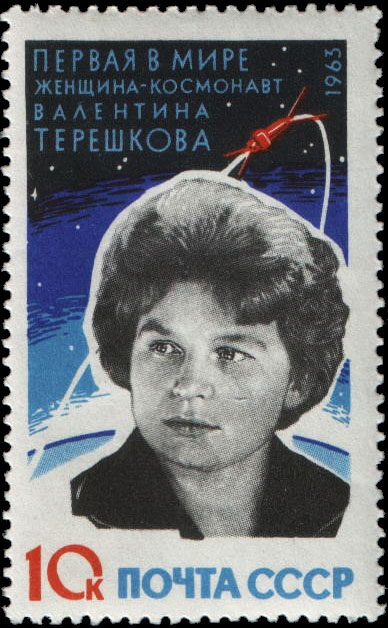
Valentina Tereshkova, the first woman in space

Soviet space exploration history has been well documented on Soviet stamps. These Soviet stamps cover a broad spectrum of subjects related to the Soviet space program. While much of the focus has been placed on the nation's notable "firsts" in space flight, including: Earth orbiting satellite, Sputnik 1; first animal in space, Sputnik 2, the first human in space and Earth orbit, Yuri Gagarin on Vostok 1; first spacewalk, Alexei Leonov on Voskhod 2; woman in space, Valentina Tereshkova on Vostok 6; Moon impact, 1959, and uncrewed landing; space station; and interplanetary probe; numerous stamps have paid tribute to more general astronomical topics as well.

== See also ==
- Postage stamps of the Soviet Union
- U.S. space exploration history on U.S. stamps
- Space Race
