= Postage stamps of the Soviet Union =

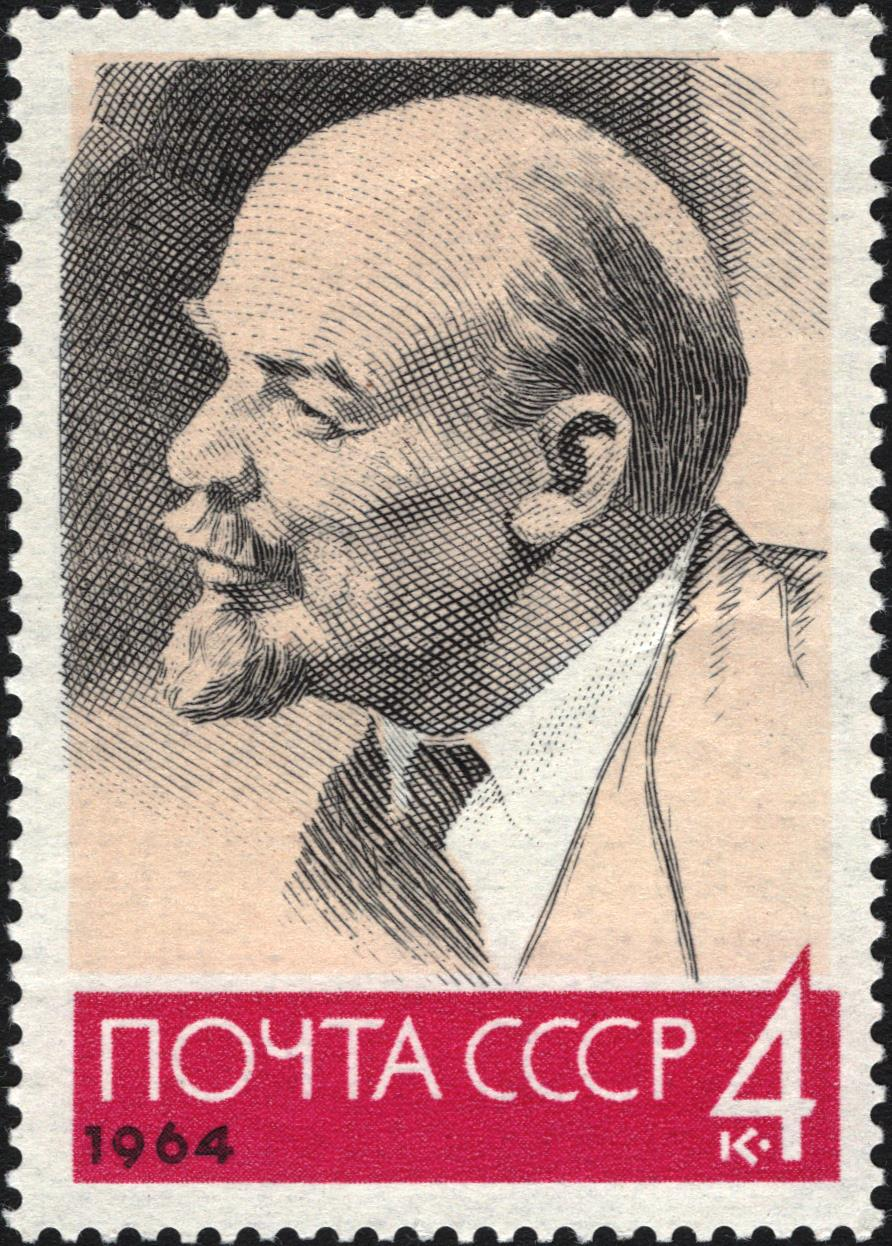
Vladimir Lenin on Soviet stamp of 1964. Designed by Pyotr Vasilyev.

Stamps of the Soviet Union were issued in the period 1923 to 1991. They were labeled with the inscription Russian: "Почта СССР" ("Post of the USSR"). In the thematics, Soviet stamps reflected to a large extent the history, politics, economics and culture of this world's first socialist state.

Notable designers of Soviet postage stamps were Ivan Dubasov (who designed the Lenin Mourning issue, the first stamps portraying Vladimir Lenin in 1924) and Vasily Zavyalov. By the mid-1970s, over 4,000 stamps came out in the USSR. In 1970, the Catalogue of Postage Stamps of the USSR, 1918–1969 was published in Moscow, the yearly supplements being produced afterwards. The history and design of Soviet postage stamps were elucidated in the annual publication Soviet Collector and the monthly magazine Filateliya SSSR.

== First stamps ==
The first postage stamps of the newly proclaimed Union of Soviet Socialist Republics were designed by Georgy Pashkov and issued in August 1923 in relation to the First All-Russian Agricultural and Handicraft Exhibition.

First All-Russia Agricultural Exhibition issue of 1923

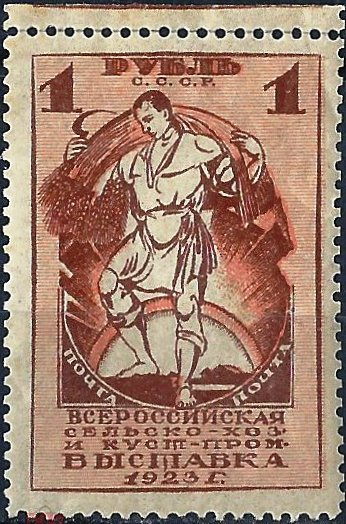
Reaper, 1 rouble

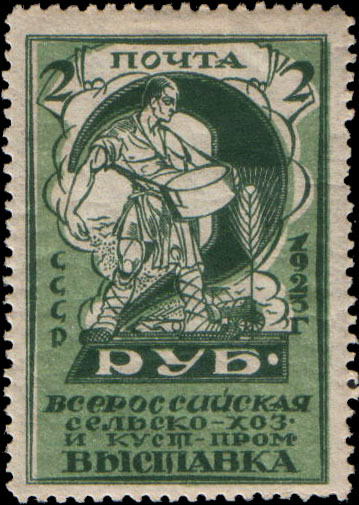
Sower, 2 roubles

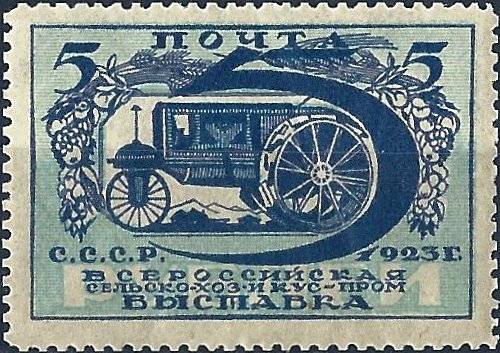
Tractor, 5 roubles

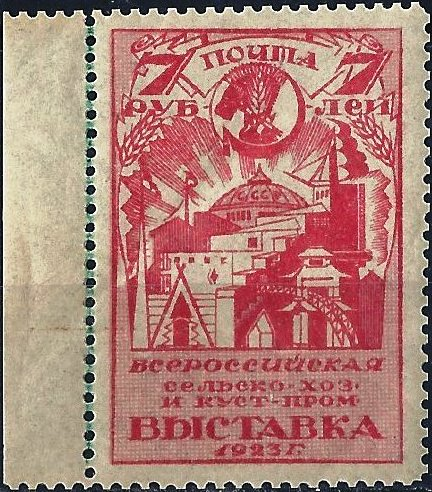
Exhibition general view,
7 roubles

== Definitive issues ==
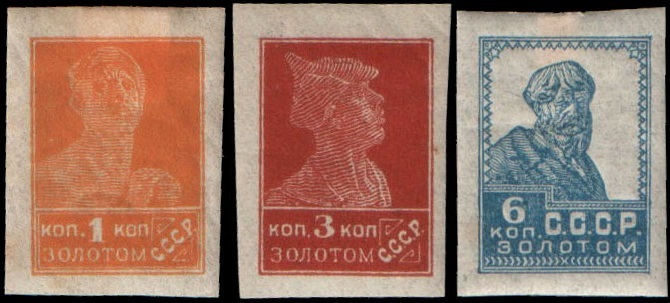
Worker, Red Army soldier, and peasant, Gold Standard issue of 1923

The first series of the USSR definitive stamps known as the Gold Standard issue appeared in October 1923. Their design proposed by Ivan Shadr included the busts of the worker, Red Army soldier and peasant. Also, there was a plan to sell more stamps in the international market. By targeting stamps for sales abroad, the Soviet government reckoned on earning hard currency.

Examples of 1929 stamps with face values of 7 and 14 kopecks

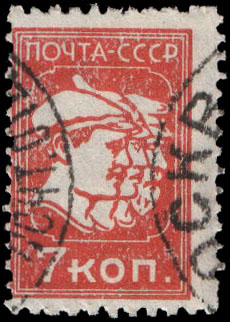
Worker, soldier and peasant,
3rd definitive issue, 1929

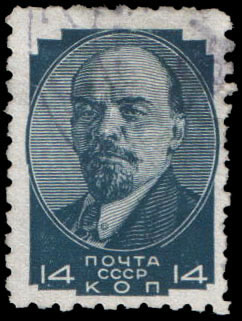
Lenin, 3rd definitive issue, 1929

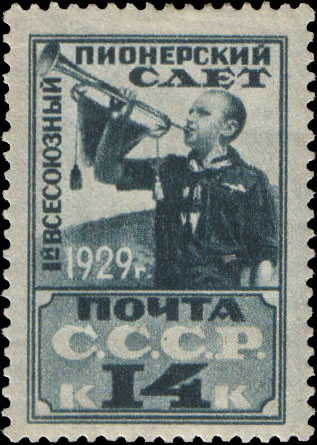
1st All-Union Pioneer Rally, 1929

Over the years, there was a steady increase in the number of different stamps issued annually by the USSR. Stamp denominations continued including international postage rates. For instance, most new issues during 1939 and 1940 had face values between 10 and 30 kopecks, i.e. more than those for standard internal postage.

Examples of 1939 stamps with face values of 10 and 30 kopecks

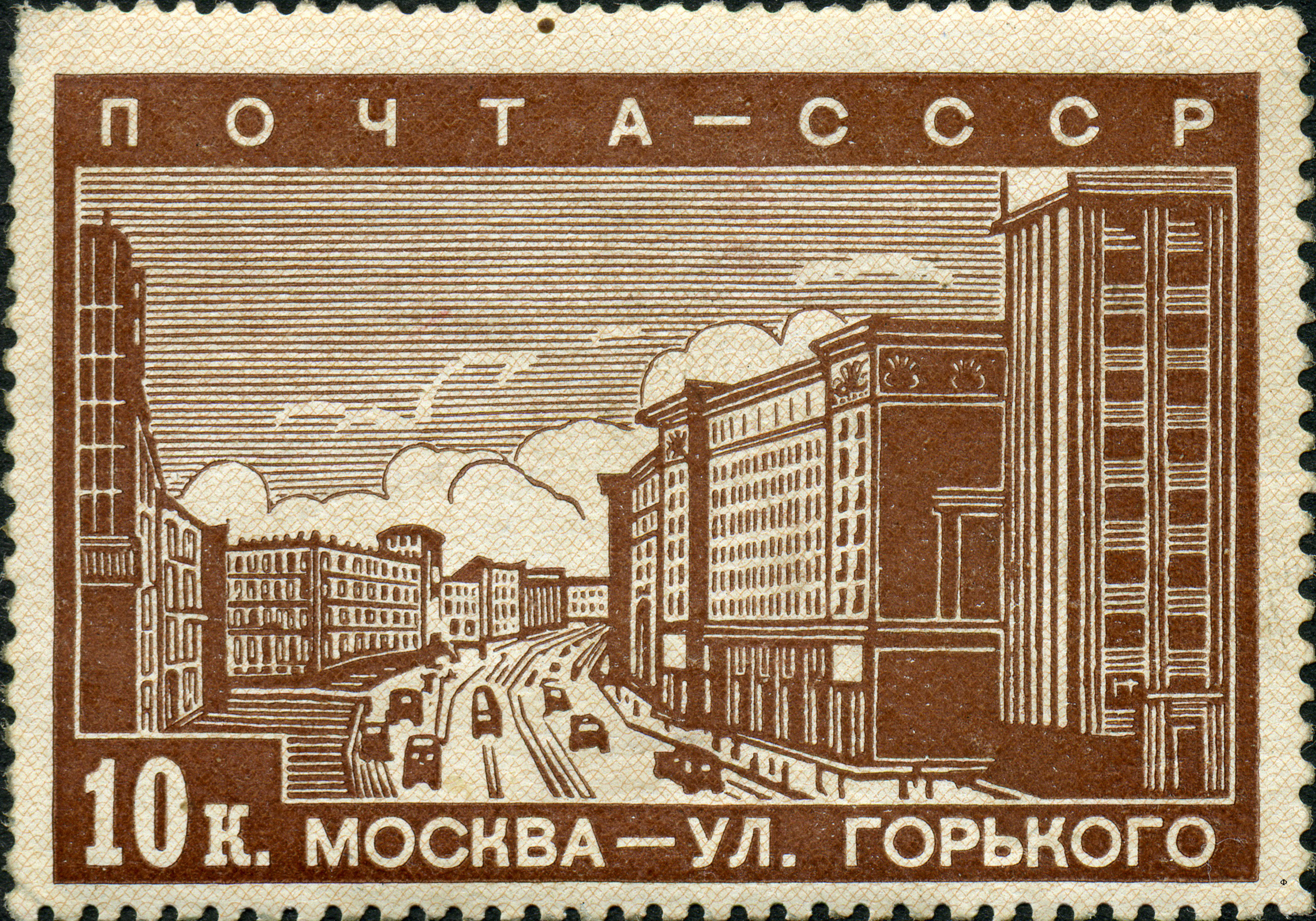
Gorky Street, Moscow

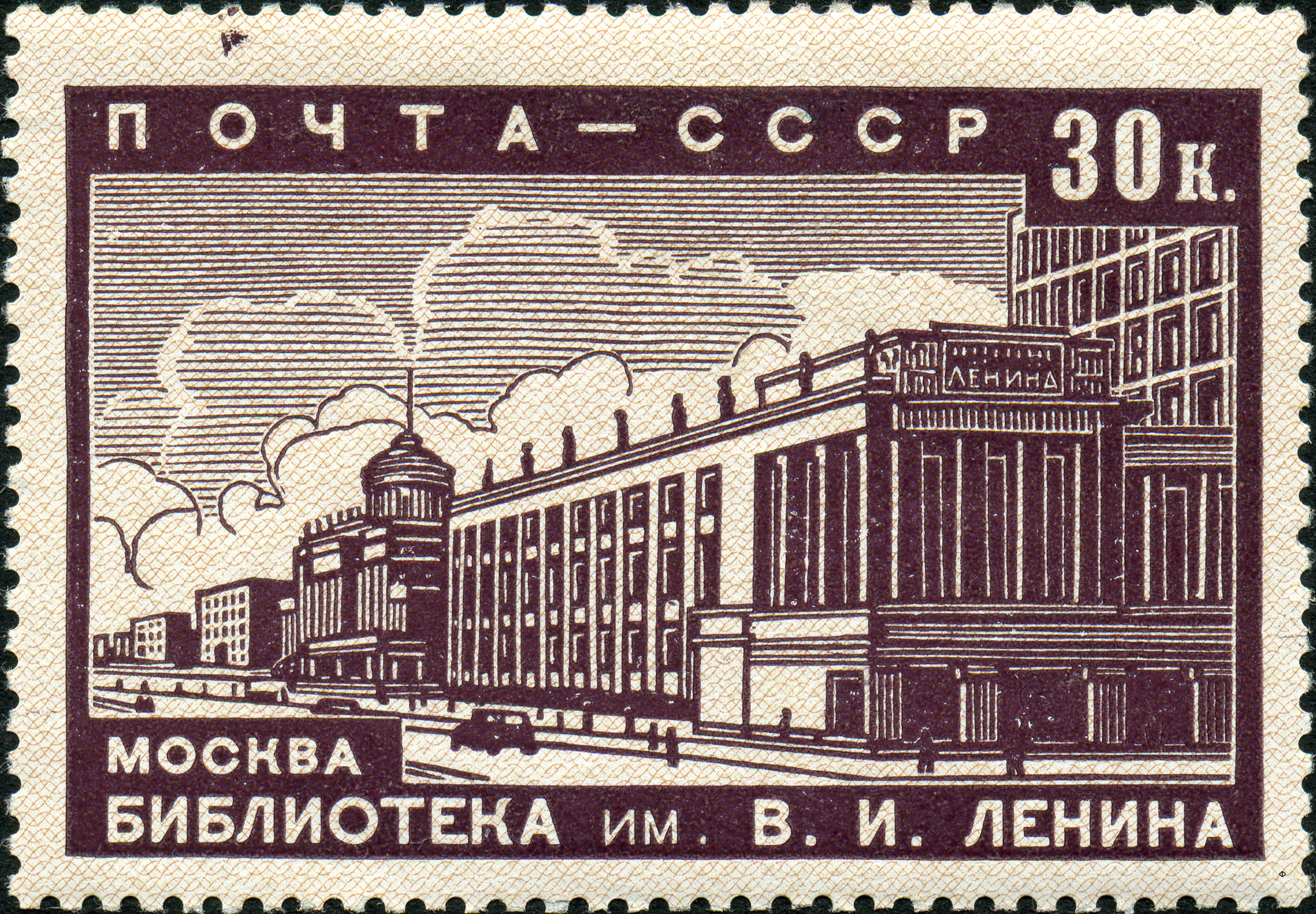
Lenin Library, Moscow

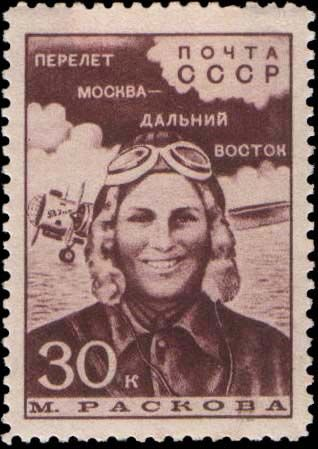
Marina Raskova,
flight Moscow—Far East

USSR Pavilion at the
1939 New York World's Fair

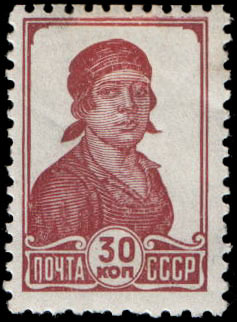
Factory woman, 5th definitive issue

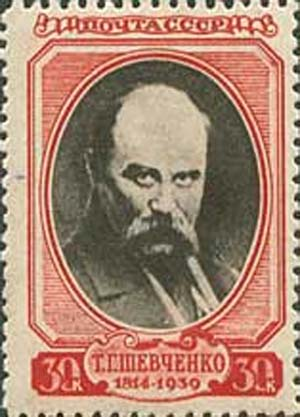
125th birth anniversary
of Taras Shevchenko

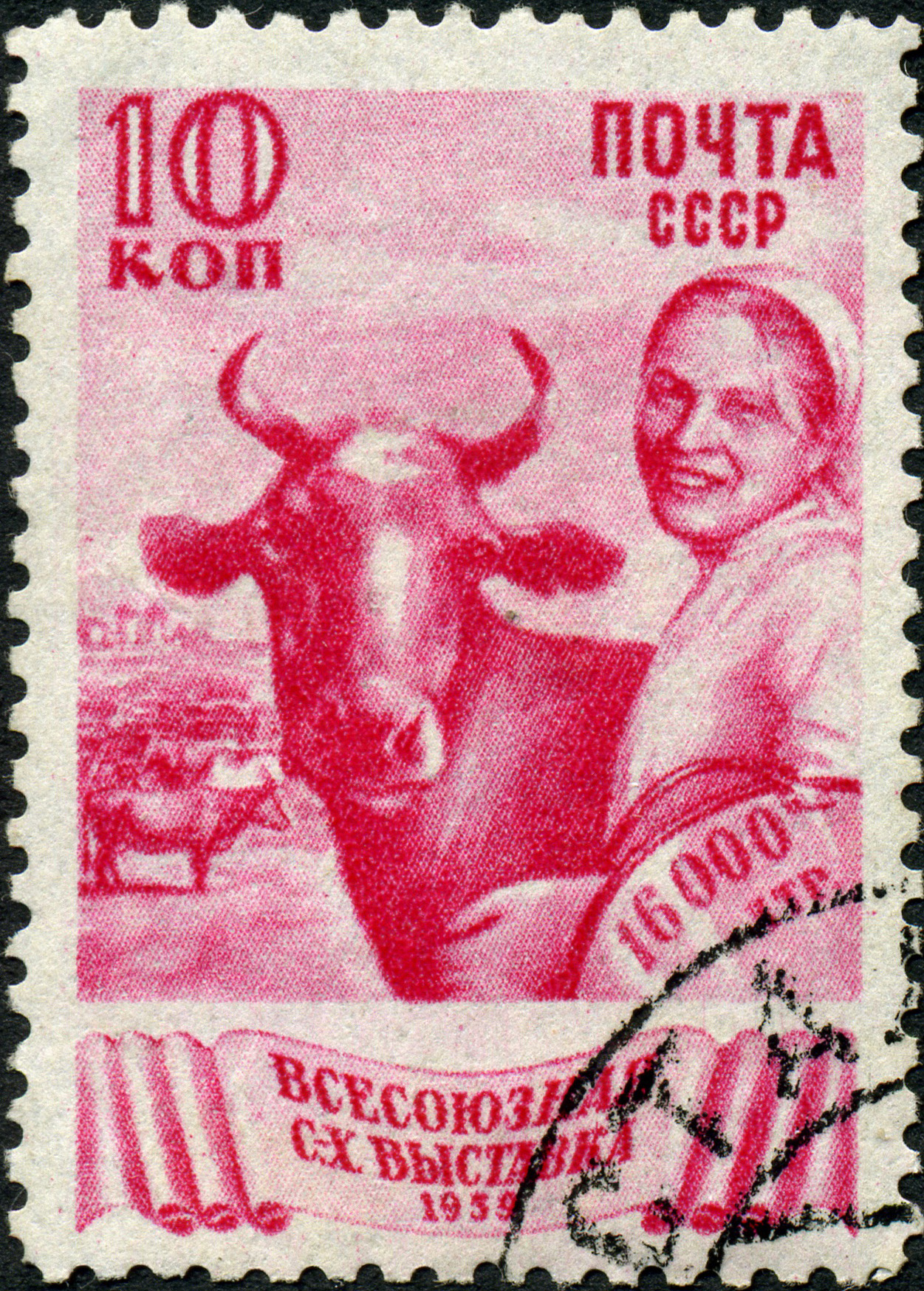
Dairy farming, milkmaid with prize cow, All-Union Agricultural Exhibition

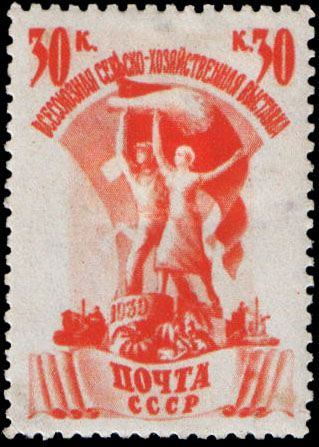
Emblem "Tractor Driver and Kolkhoz Woman", All-Union Agricultural Exhibition

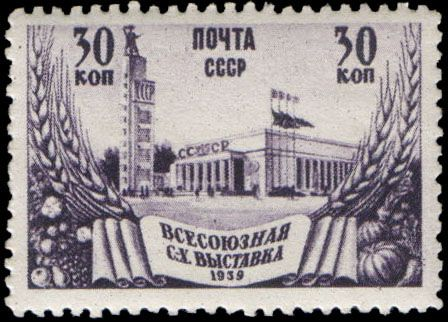
Central Pavilion, All-Union Agricultural Exhibition

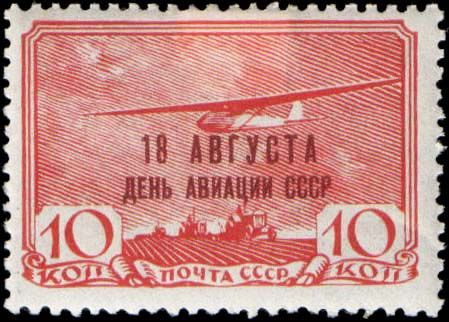
Glider, Soviet Aviation Day

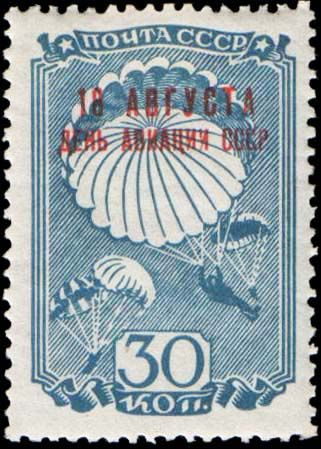
Parachutists, Soviet Aviation Day

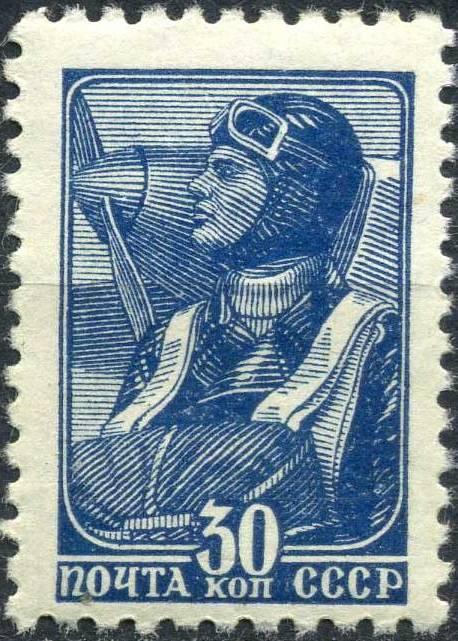
Airman, 6th definitive issue

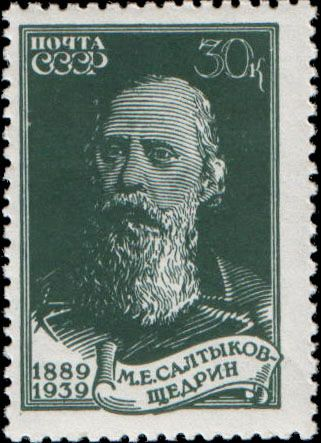
50th death anniversary
of Mikhail Saltykov-Shchedrin

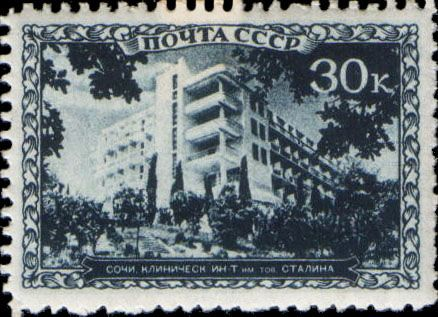
Sochi, Caucasian health resorts

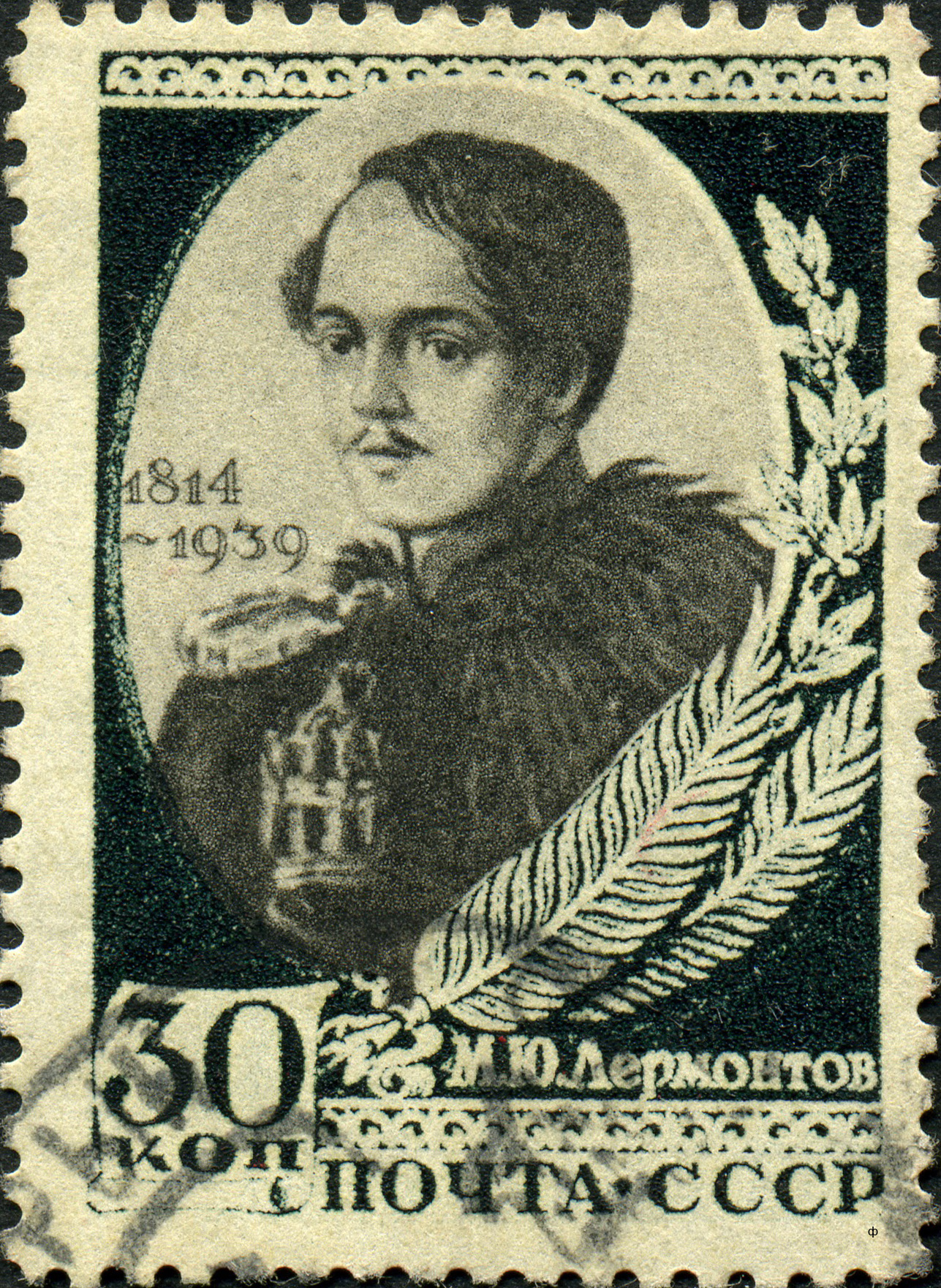
125th birth anniversary
of Mikhail Lermontov

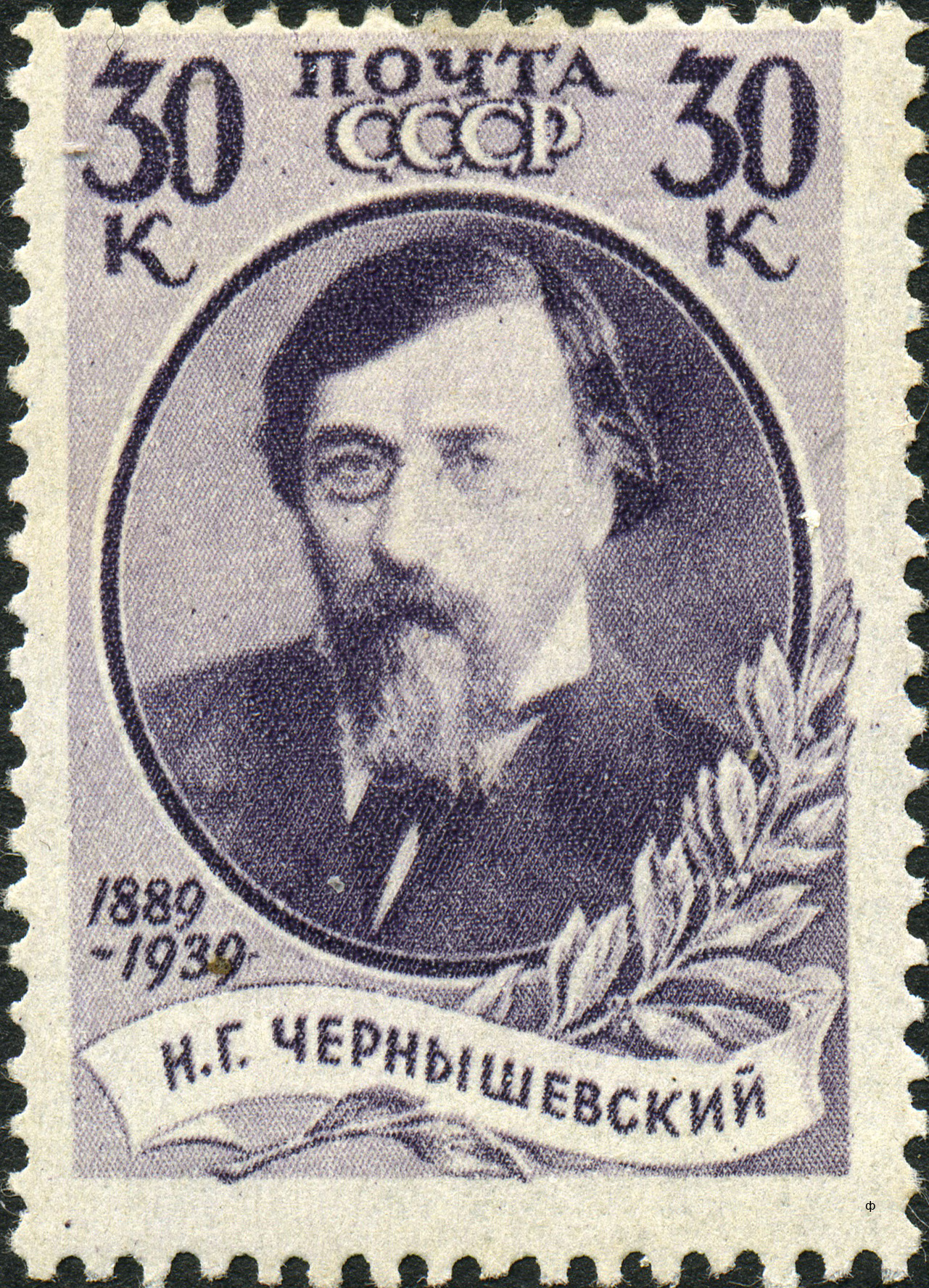
50th death anniversary
of Nikolay Chernyshevsky
Examples of 1940 stamps with face values of 10 and 30 kopecks

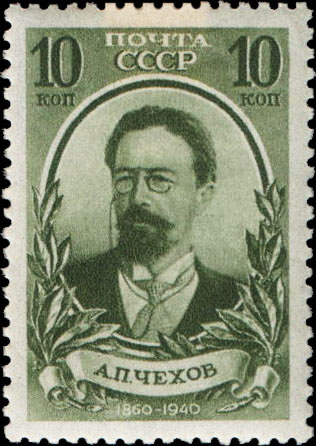
80th birth anniversary
of Anton Chekhov

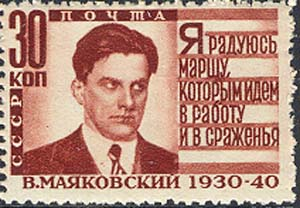
10th death anniversary
of Vladimir Mayakovsky

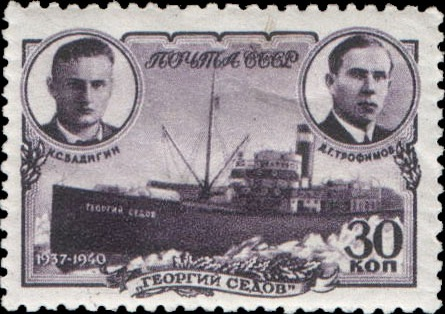
Icebreaker Georgy Sedov

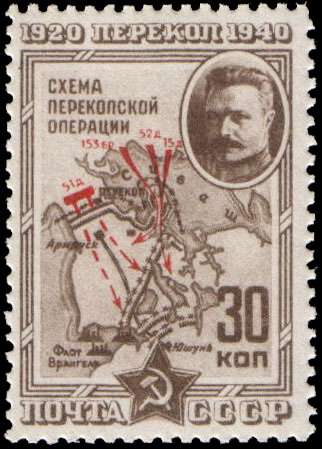
20th anniversary of the
Perekop operation

One of the important topics represented on the USSR stamps was the Communist Party of the Soviet Union. It was usually done in two ways:

- dedicating stamps to numerous remarkable Party members, both the living and the deceased,
- placing the Party slogans and resolutions.
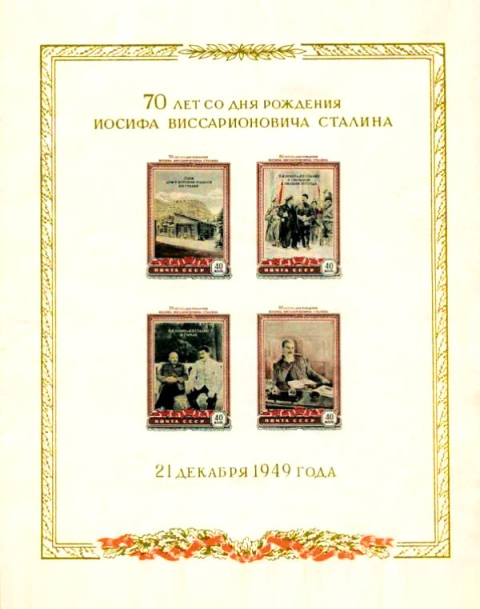
Stalin souvenir sheet of 1949 celebrating the 70th birth anniversary of Joseph Stalin

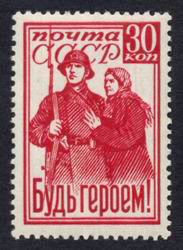
Be a Hero!, the first USSR stamp dedicated to the Great Patriotic War, 1941

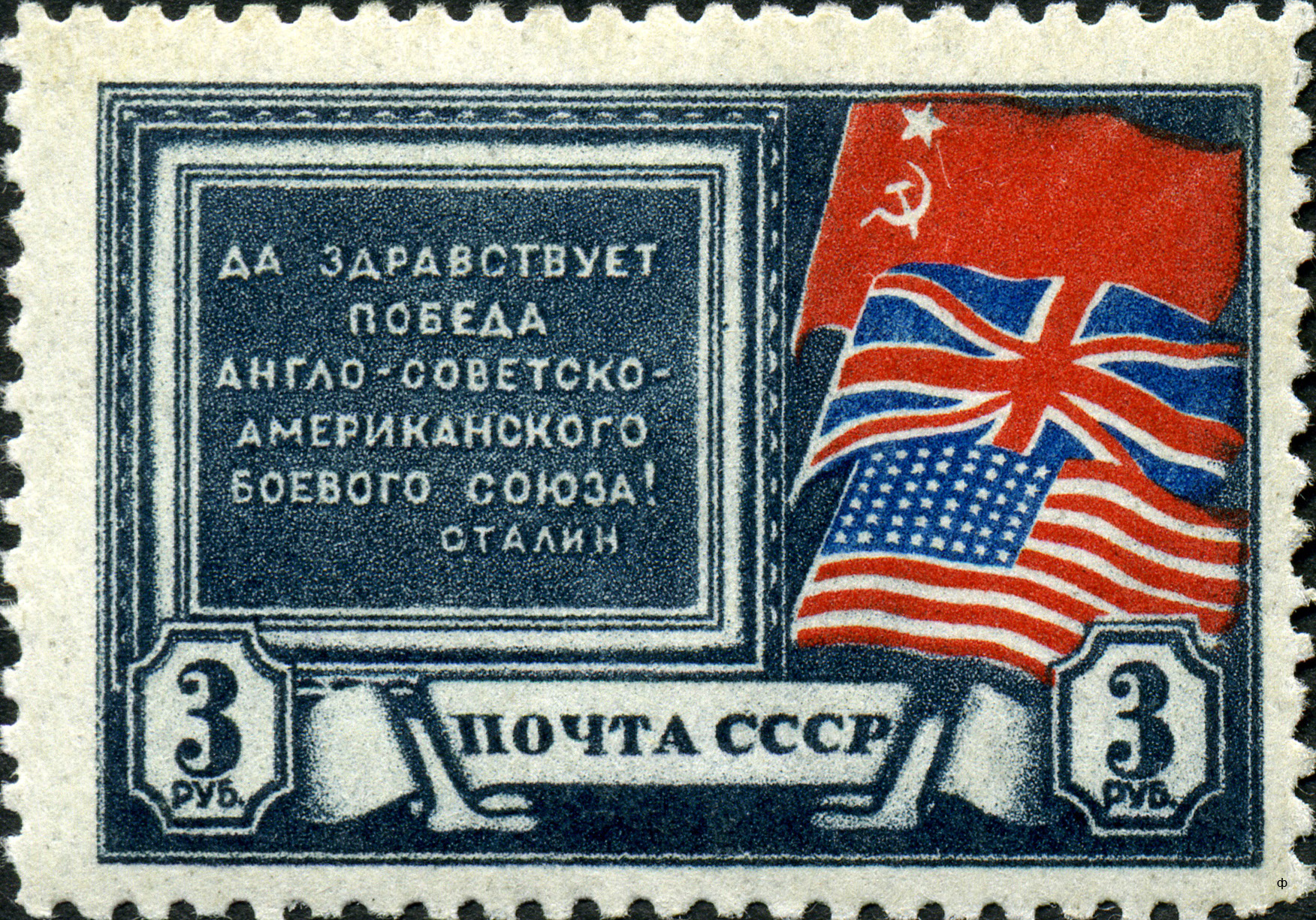
"Long live the victory of the Anglo-Soviet-American fighting alliance! (Stalin)", a 1943 stamp marking the Tehran Conference

Vladimir Lenin was pictured on Soviet stamps most often among the Bolsheviks, with the first Leniniana stamps appeared after his death in January 1924. Lifetime images of Party members on stamps were used to emphasize the theme of state power. One of such examples was a 1935 set of stamps commemorating Mikhail Kalinin's 60th birthday and depicting him as a worker, a farmer, and an orator. These Kalinin stamps illustrated the motive powers of the Soviet state: the worker, the farmer, and the Communist Party. Such a practice is considered a worldwide trend when in-power politicians are shown on postage stamps symbolizing the state.

The Party slogans and resolutions on Soviet stamps changed over time. Earlier stamp themes in the 1920s reflected, though indirectly, the spirit of New Economic Policy. Since 1929, stamps had been used for a clear declaration of the changed economic policies. When Joseph Stalin initiated industrialisation, a special set of stamps was issued to support this effort. For example, the 10-kopecks stamp showed a series of tractors, saying "Let us increase the harvest by 35%". An inscription on the 20-kopecks stamp called for "More metal, more machines!". The 28-kopecks stamp pictured a blast furnace, a chart for iron-ore production and the slogan "Iron, 8 million tons".

Slogans of the Industrialisation issue, 1929

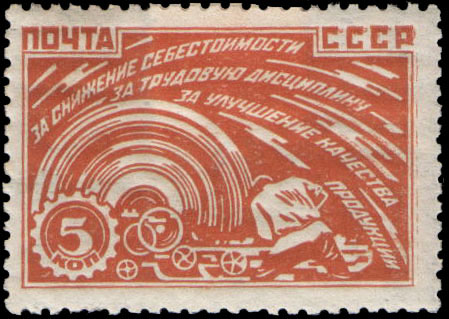
"For the lower cost of goods sold, for work discipline, for the better quality of a product"

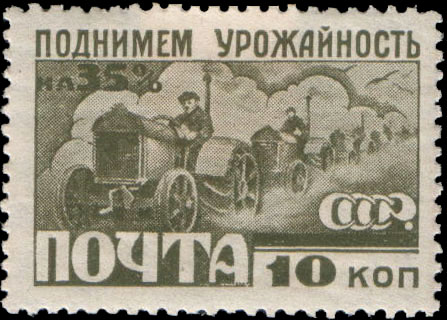
"Let us increase the harvest by 35%"

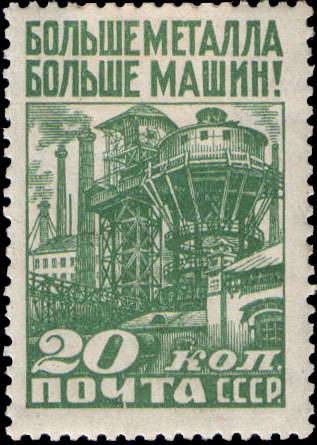
"More metal, more machines!"

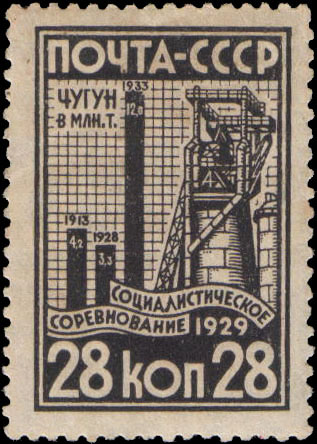
"Iron, 8 million tons"

After the Great Patriotic War, the government used stamps to call for economic reconstruction and mobilisation. A 1946 stamp issue summoned: "Give the country annually 127 million tons of grain", "60 million tons of oil", "60 million tons of steel", "500 million tons of coal", and "50 million tons of cast iron".

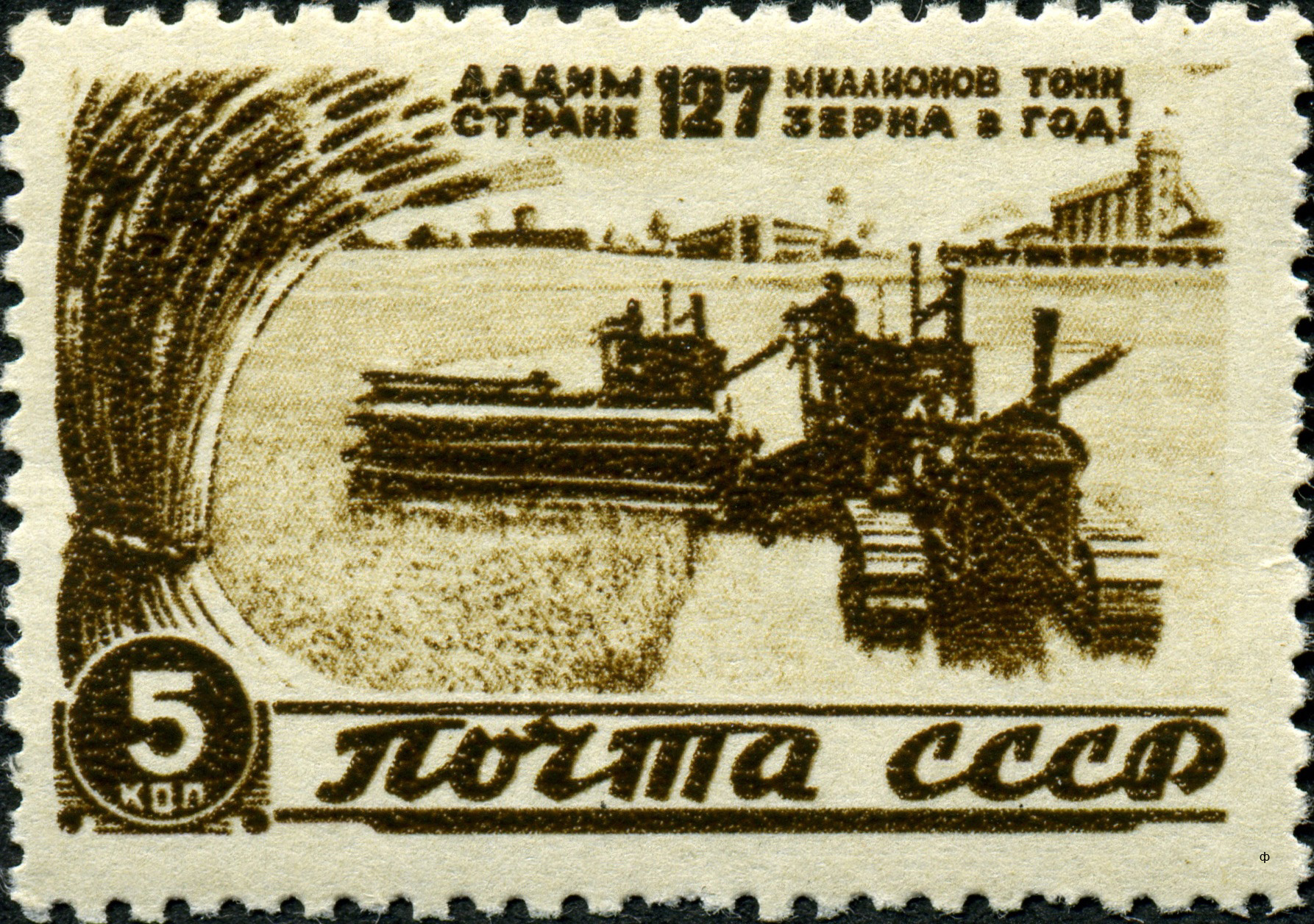
"Give the country annually 127 million tons of grain", 1946

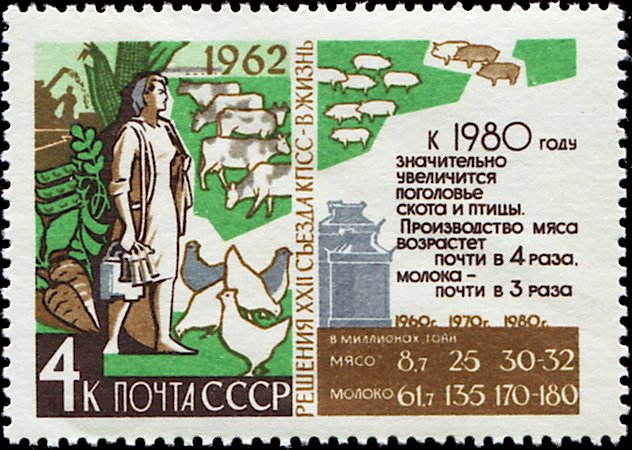
"By 1980 livestock, cattle and chickens will be significantly increased. Production of meat will grow almost 4 times,
milk almost 3 times", 1962

Short heroic slogans of the Stalin period calling for economic mobilization were substituted on Soviet stamps in the post-Stalin years. Party platforms with rather lengthy excerpts from Party documents and congresses' resolutions appeared on stamps at that time. Such was, for instance, the series of "Decisions of the 22nd Congress of the Communist Party of the Soviet Union—into Life" that was designed by Vasily Zavyalov and A. Shmidshtein, and issued in 1962.

In later years, the style of stamp messages continued, differing from those of the Stalin times. They were no longer brief imperative commands but rather promises and explanations by the Party to Soviet society. For example, on a 1971 souvenir sheet from the 24th Party Congress series designed by Yu. Levinovsky and A. Shmidshtein, there was an inscription saying that "the main problem is to provide a significant increase of the material and cultural level of life of the people on the basis of high rates of development of socialist production, an increase of its effectiveness, scientific-technical progress, and an acceleration of the growth of the productiveness of labor". (Note: Later definitive issues reflected changes in the Soviet economic programs, with the correspondingly changed portrayals of the major society groups.)

Such messages were typical of stamps for the Brezhnev and post-Brezhnev period until the changes occurred under Mikhail Gorbachev. New slogans, "perestroika", "uskoreniye", "demokratizatsiya", and "glasnost", were coined and appeared on the postage stamps of the USSR.

Perestroyka issues of 1988

Soviet Union was a sport powerhouse

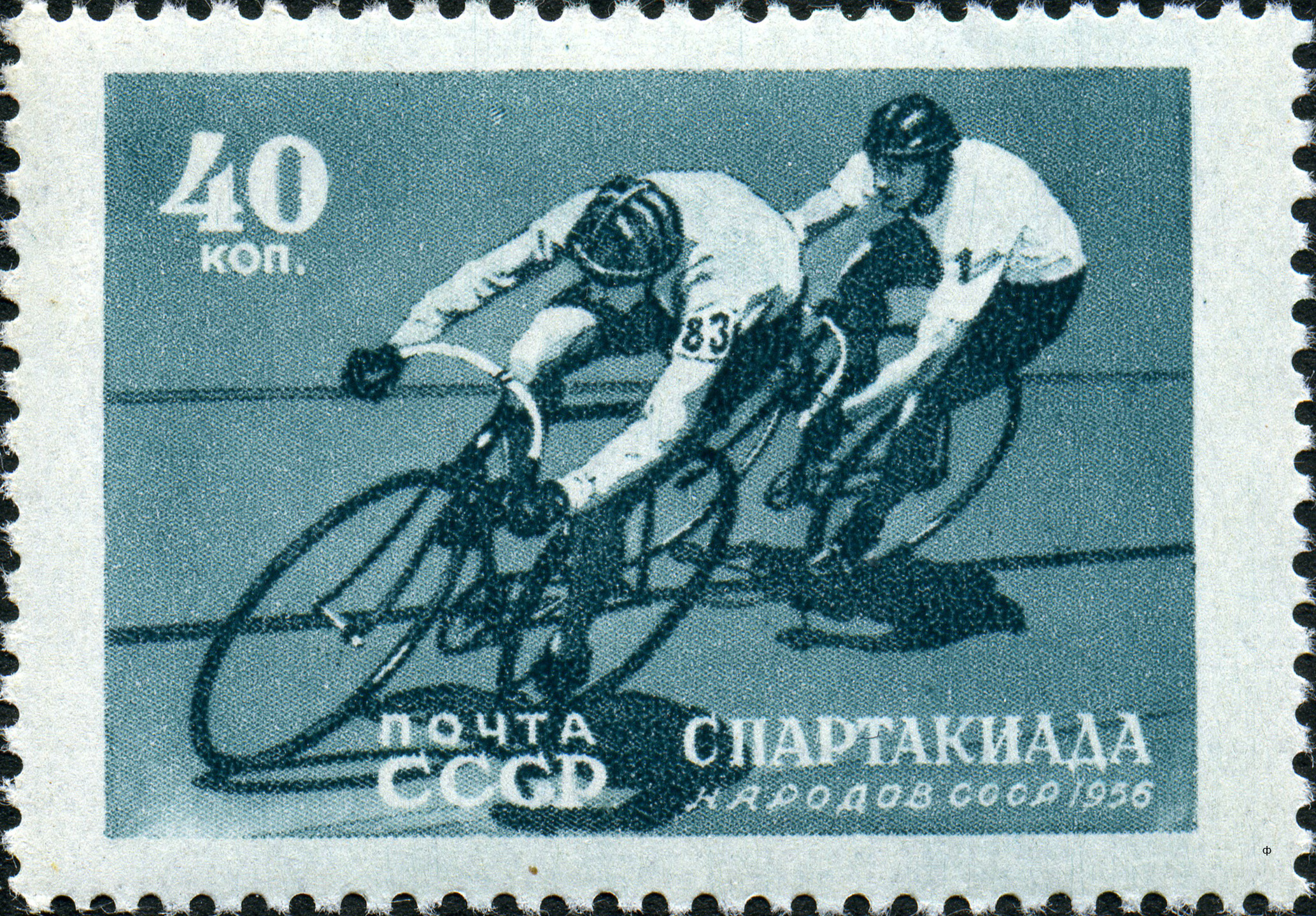
1956 Spartakiad of Peoples of the USSR

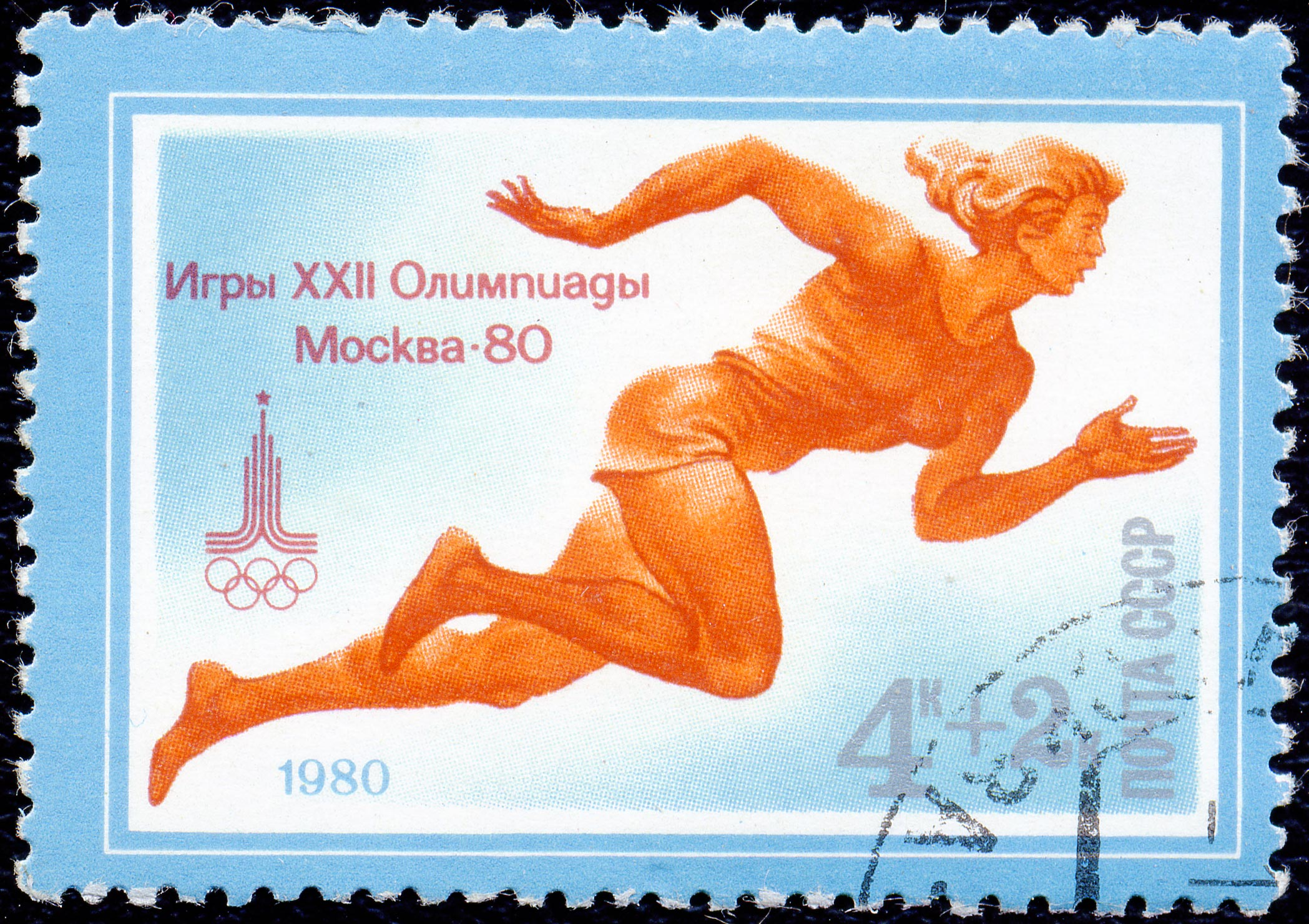
1980 Summer Olympics in Moscow

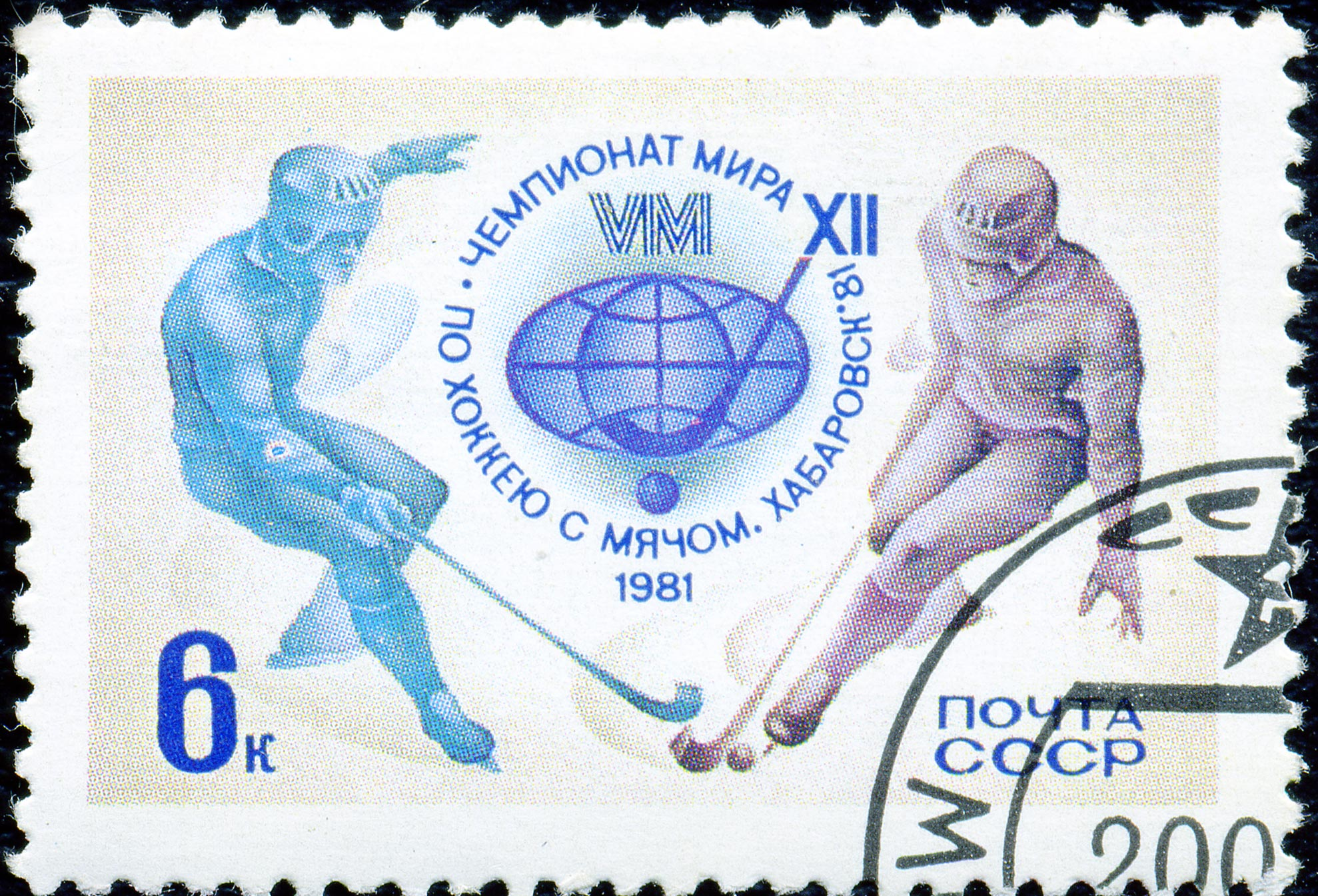
1981 Bandy World Championship in Khabarovsk

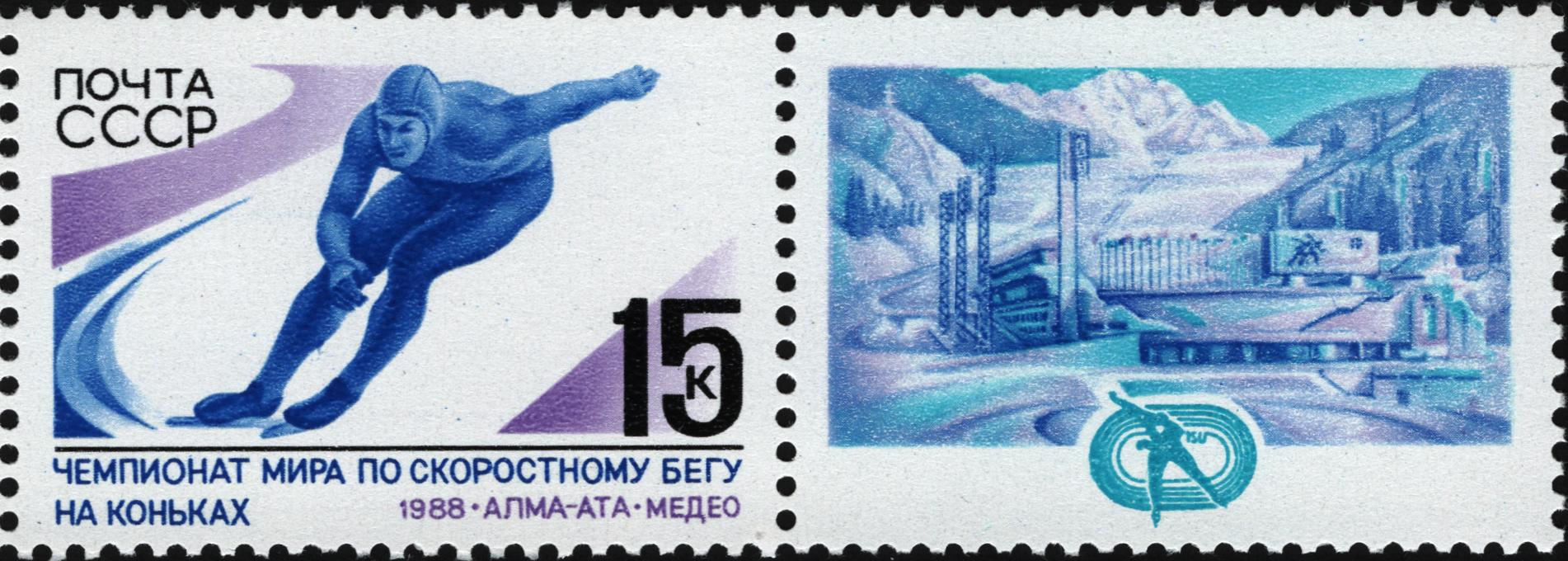
1988 World Allround Speed Skating Championships for Men in Alma-Ata (now "Almaty")

== Rarities ==
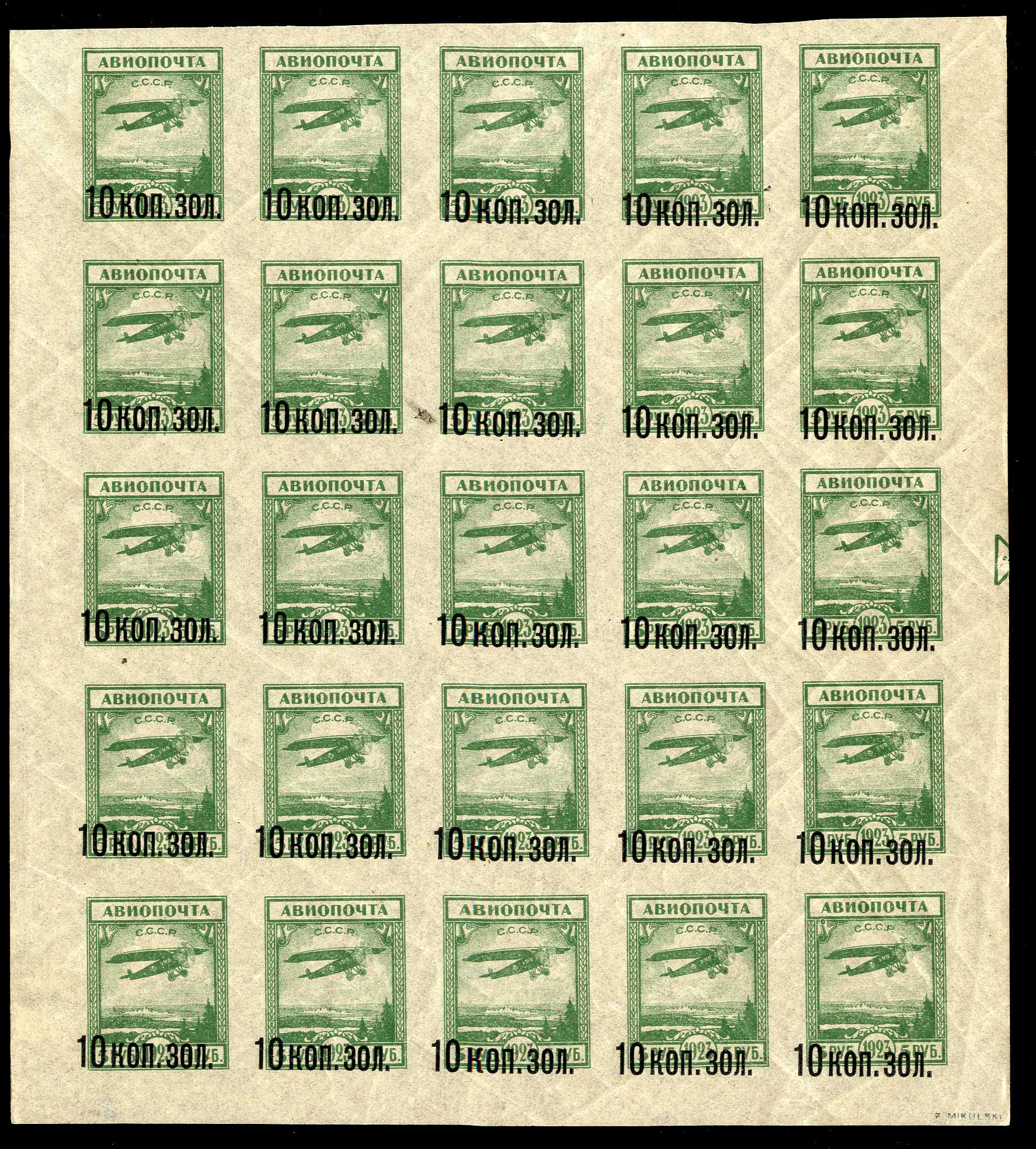
Soviet Air Post "Wide 5" surcharged, a unique pane of 25 USSR airmail stamps, 1924

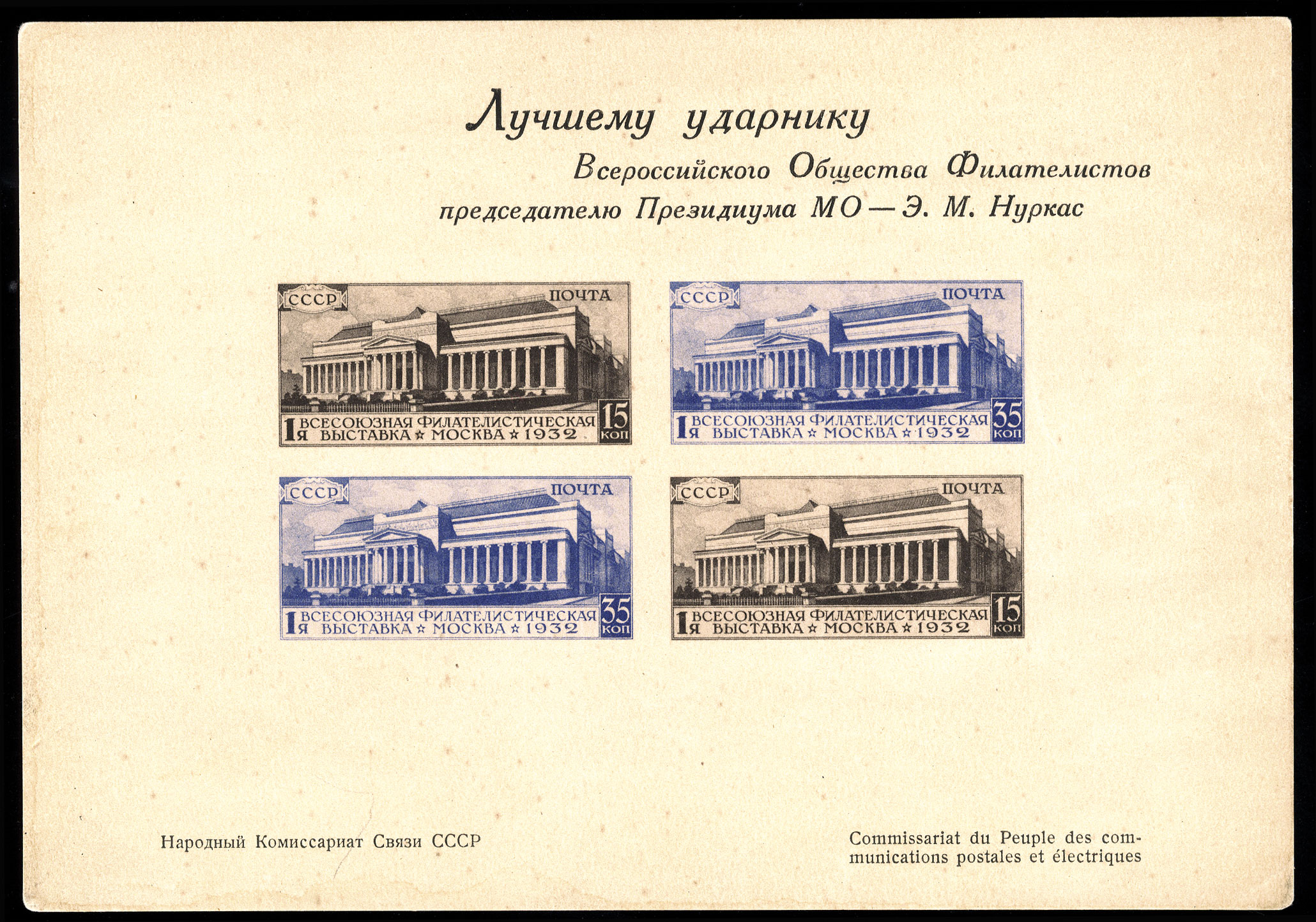
Personalised Kartonka "All-Soviet Philatelic Exhibition", 1932. Designed by Vasily Zavyalov

A unique complete pane of 25 early Soviet Union stamps is known as Soviet Air Post "Wide 5" surcharged. The stamp itself was produced in 1924 as a surcharge of 10 kopecks on 5-rouble green type II, basic stamp wide "5".

In 1925, a 15-kopeck yellow stamp of "Peasant" design was printed in a very small quantity within the Gold Standard issue. Named Limonka, it is considered very rare, especially if in mint condition.

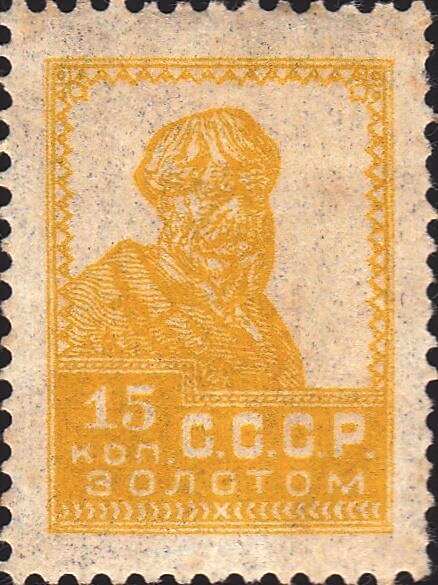
Limonka, 1925,
15 kopecks

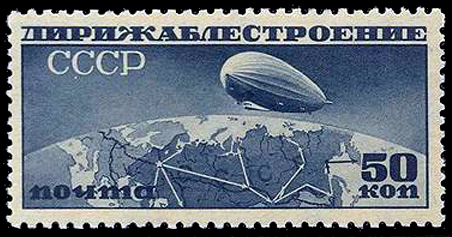
Aspidka, 1931, 50 kopecks, perforated

Another very rare Soviet stamp, issued in 1931, is Aspidka, especially if imperforate; 24 imperforate specimens are known. Its design was created by Vasily Zavyalov.

In 1932, the All-Soviet Philatelic Exhibition was organized in Moscow. On that occasion, a souvenir sheet of four stamps known as Personalised Kartonka was produced on thick card, with three-line overprint "To the best shock worker of the All Russian Philatelic Society – President of the Moscow Philatelic Organization E.M. Nurk". It is considered rare because only 25 souvenir sheets were issued.

A San Francisco inverted surcharge with small Cyrillic "ф" ("f") is characteristic of a rare Soviet stamp called Levanevsky with overprint. Possibly unique, it was designed by Vasily Zavyalov and issued in 1935.

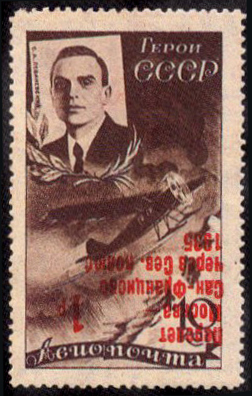
Levanevsky with overprint, 1935, 1 rouble on 10 kopecks

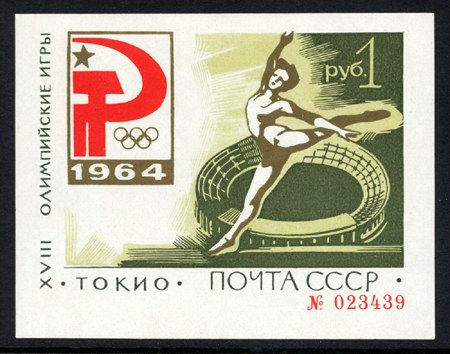
Green souvenir sheet, 1964, 1 rouble

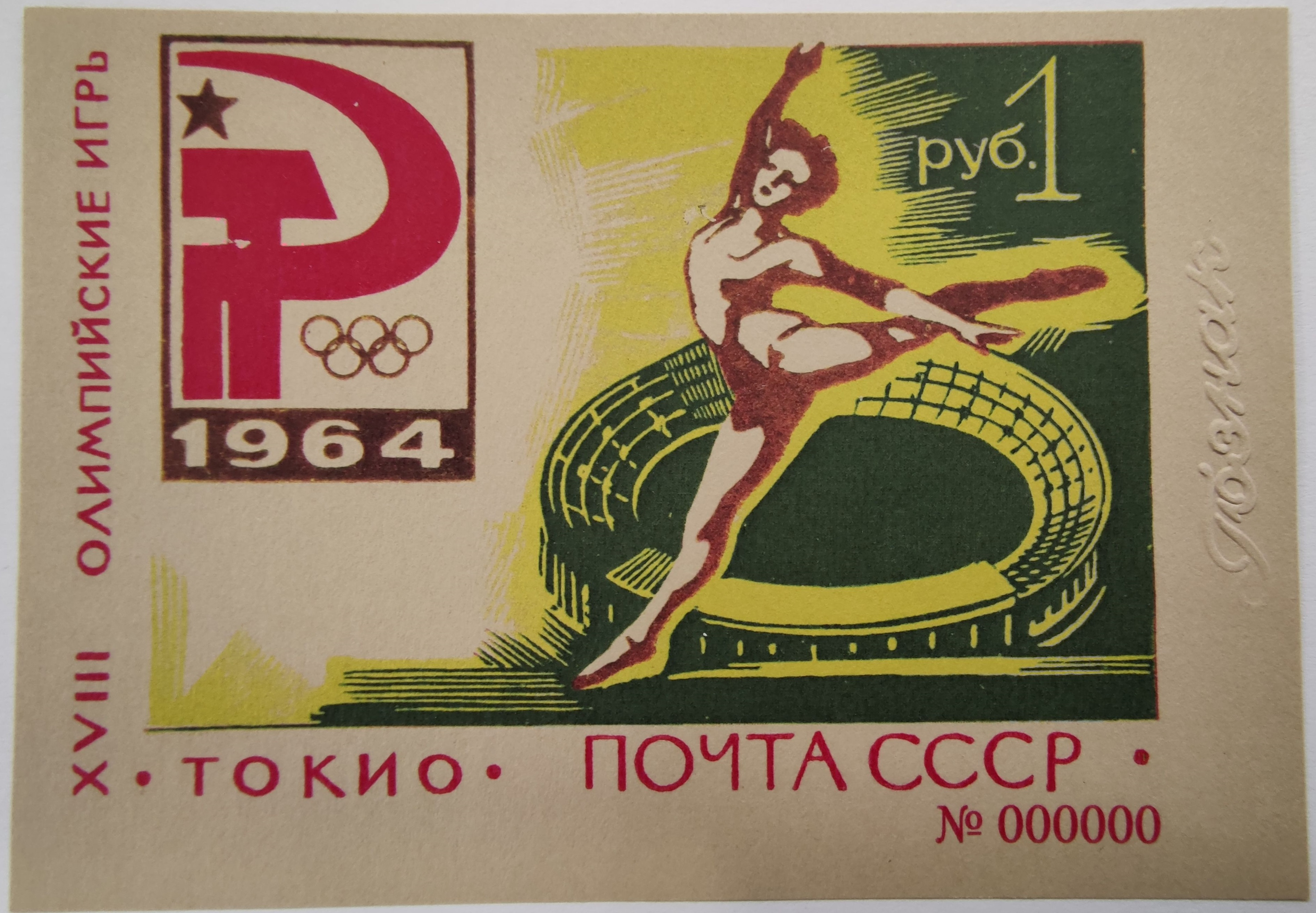
Russian Tokyo 1964. Trial edition - Goznak factory

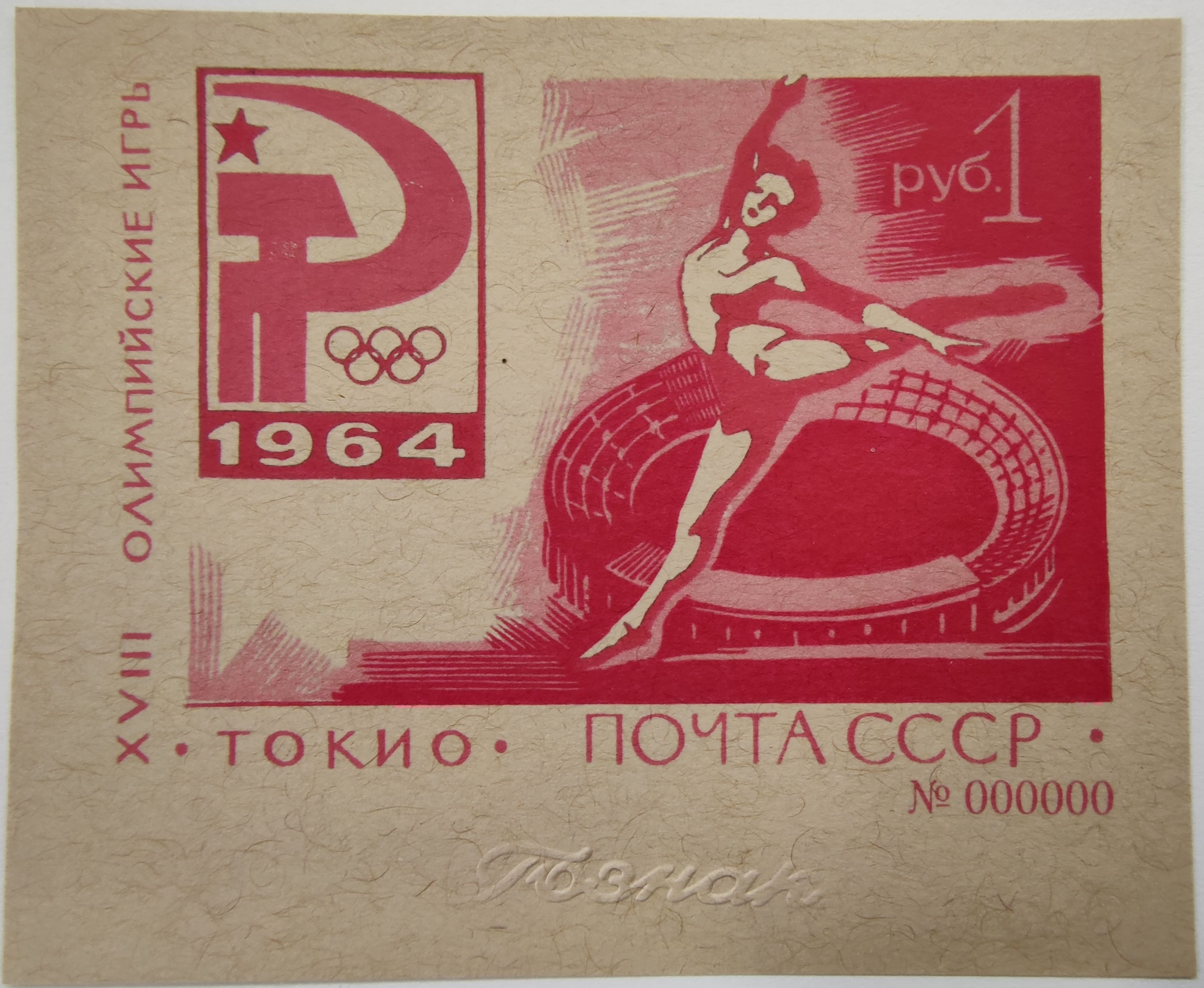
tokyo olympiad 1964 attempt to colour red embossed sign goznak

Due to a plate error (asymmetric star), a variety of the first Soviet numbered Tokyo Olympic souvenir sheet of 1964 is now quite rare and known as Green souvenir sheet. The Russian Goznak stamp factory has released several sheets of the Tokyo 1964 trial stamps, they are very rare and there are few left.

== Stamp thematics and other aspects ==
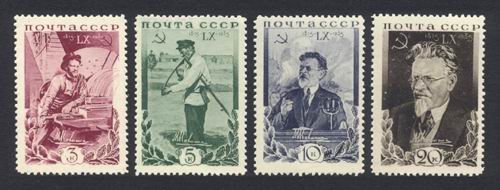
60th birth anniversary of Mikhail Kalinin, 1935. Designed by Vasily Zavyalov.

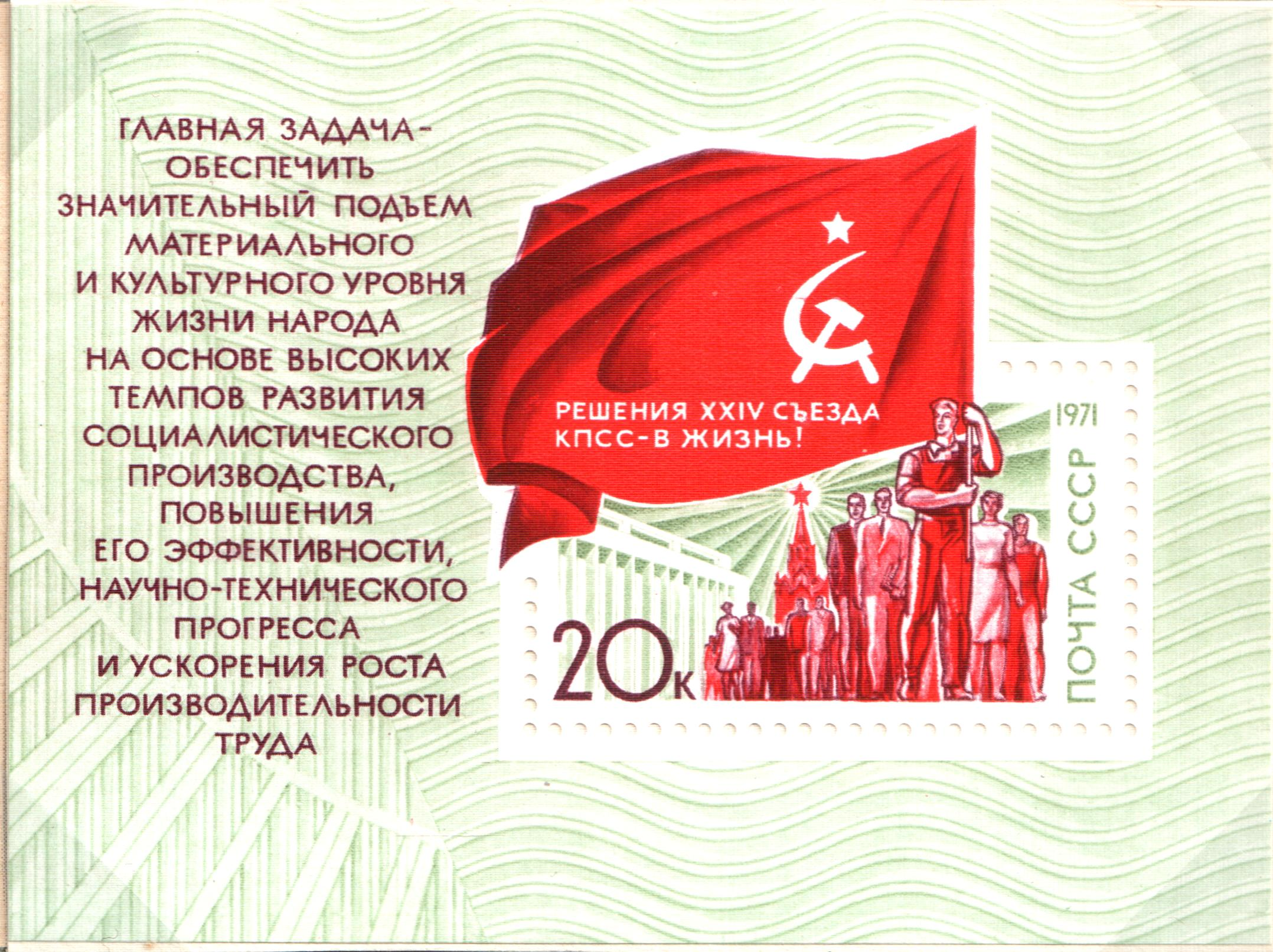
Workers march with flag, the Kremlin Palace of Congresses and the Spasskaya Tower. The 24th Communist Party of the Soviet Union Congress resolutions. Miniature sheet of 1971

Soviet Union stamps covered a great variety of themes. The thematics mirrored various aspects of Soviet history, politics, economics, and culture. These included:

- the accomplishments of the Great October Socialist Revolution,
- achievements of industry, agriculture, science, and culture,
- various anniversary celebrations.

After 1929, the quality of the Soviet stamps improved. Their agitational content expanded, as well. Increasing attention was given to stamps with face values of 7, 14, and 28 kopecks used for international correspondence. These stamps were "supposed to tell the truth to the world about the victories of the workers' country of the Soviets".

== See also ==
- 70r Red Army Soldier error
- Definitive stamps of the Soviet Union
- First USSR stamps
- Gold Standard issue
- International trading tax stamp
- Leniniana
- List of paintings on Soviet postage stamps
- List of postage stamps
- Postage stamps and postal history of Russia
- Soviet and post-Soviet postage rates
- Soviet space exploration history on Soviet stamps
- Soviet Union stamp catalogue
